= Andi Campognone =

American curator, author, and film producer (born 1965)

Andi Campognone (born 1965 in Los Angeles County) is California-based curator, author, and film producer, known for championing contemporary Southern California artists.

== Biography ==
Campognone attended Georgia State University, where she studied business, and Woodbury University and Chaffey College where she focused on art. In 2005, as associate director and exhibitions curator at Riverside Art Museum, she co-curated, with Peter Frank, "Driven to Abstraction: Southern California and the Non-Objective World, 1950–1980," the first museum exhibition that exclusively focused on abstract painting contributions from Southern California from 1950 to 1980.

In 2007, she opened her first gallery, dba256, in Pomona, followed by Andi Campognone Projects, which showed artists such as Roland Reiss, Lita Albuquerque, Thomas McGovern and Sant Khalsa. A past President of the Pomona Arts Colony Association, she also served on the City of Pomona Cultural Arts Commission, where she contributed to the writing of the Cultural Master Plan and the Arts in Public Places Policy.

In 2011, Campognone became the Museum Manager/Curator for the Museum of Art and History in Lancaster, CA (MOAH), and began an ambitious program focusing on contemporary California artists that included exhibition and acquisition. She co-curated MOAH's opening show, "Smooth Operations: Substance and Surface in Southern California Art" with Peter Frank. The exhibition looked at the use of new and non-traditional materials in the fabrication of art objects, many of which came directly from the aerospace industry, leading to the emergence of artistic movements such as Finish Fetish and Light and Space. Among the artists featured in Smooth Operations were Larry Bell, DeWain Valentine, Ronald Davis, Craig Kauffman, Judy Chicago, Roland Reiss, Norman Zammitt, Fred Eversley, VASA, Doug Edge, Terry O’Shea and Jerome Mahoney.

Since then, Campognone has helped launched the museum's green initiative, created community programs, and curated shows featuring artists Ed Moses, Kim Abeles, Lita Albuquerque, Gary Baseman, Karl Benjamin, Charles Dickson, Nancy Macko, Catherine Opie, Kim Stringfellow, Phillip K. Smith III, Shepard Fairey, Banksy, Barry McGee, Keith Haring, Robbie Conal, Gary Lang, Ruth Pastine, Linda Vallejo, Justin Bower and Andrew Frieder.

Campognone wrote Circles and Words, which explored the career of artist Gary Lang. She also executive produced the 2014 documentary Mana, directed by Eric Minh Swenson, which explores the studio practice of 10 Los Angeles artists and their relationship to surfing and the ocean.

She currently serves on granting committees for Los Angeles County Arts Commission and the California Community Foundation and is a member of the advisory board for the Los Angeles Art Association.
