= Tara Donovan =

American sculptor (born 1969)

- Born: 1969 (age 56–57); Flushing, New York
- Education: BFA, Corcoran College of Art and Design (1991); MFA, Virginia Commonwealth University (1999)
- Known for: Sculpture
- Awards: MacArthur Fellow (2008)

Tara Donovan (born 1969 in Flushing, Queens, in New York City) is an American sculptor who lives and works in Brooklyn, New York. Her large-scale installations, sculptures, drawings, and prints utilize everyday objects to explore the transformative effects of accumulation and aggregation. Known for her commitment to process, she has earned acclaim for her ability to exploit the inherent physical characteristics of an object in order to transform it into works that generate unique perceptual phenomena and atmospheric effects. Her work has been conceptually linked to an art historical lineage that includes Postminimalism and Process artists such as Eva Hesse, Jackie Winsor, Richard Serra, and Robert Morris, along with Light and Space artists such as Mary Corse, Helen Pashgian, Robert Irwin, and James Turrell.

== Education ==
Donovan's, formal art studies began at the School of Visual Arts (New York) in 1987–88. Donovan received her BFA at the Corcoran College of Art and Design (Washington DC) in 1991. After completing her undergraduate work, she maintained a studio in Baltimore and began participating in group exhibitions at galleries and non-profit art spaces.

== Career ==
=== Early exhibitions ===
Her first major exhibition was ArtSites 96 for the Washington Review, about the Maryland Art Place exhibition in Baltimore, where she first presented her toothpick cubes. She also participated in Options 1997 at Washington Project for the Arts, where she presented her first project utilizing torn pieces of tar paper, as well as group exhibitions at Baumgartner Galleries and Numark Gallery in Washington, DC. In 1998, Donovan held her first solo exhibition, Resonances, at Hemphill Fine Arts in Washington DC. In the same year, she exhibited New Sculpture at Reynolds Gallery in Richmond, Virginia.

Donovan returned to her studies and earned her MFA at VCUarts, part of Virginia Commonwealth University (VCU) in 1999, when she also received her first interview in Articulate Contemporary Art Review. Upon graduating, she mounted her first major museum solo exhibition at the Corcoran Gallery of Art's Hemicycle Gallery in Washington, DC in 1999, where she presented Whorl, an installation made out of approximately 8,000 pounds of nylon fiber that was bundled into units and then spread out on the floor in an expanding spiral pattern. Soon after, she relocated to New York and was invited to participate in the 2000 Biennial Exhibition at the Whitney Museum of American Art, where she presented a floor installation (Ripple, 1998) made of cut electrical cable.

=== Exhibitions ===
Donovan's first major commercial gallery exhibitions were mounted at Ace Gallery in New York and Los Angeles. Her work was included in the 2000 Whitney Biennial. Earlier, from 1999 to 2000, Donovan exhibited Whorl at Hemicycle Gallery, Corcoran Gallery of Art in Washington, DC. Upon receiving the call that she would be exhibiting this site-specific installation, Donovan is quoted as saying "I screamed and ran around in circles ... What do you think?" In a review of that exhibition, art critic Jessica Dawson observed that "Like Whorl, the artist's past works transformed outsize quantities of everyday materials—toothpicks, roofing felt, rolls of adding machine paper—into the unexpected: natural formations, seemingly living organisms, topographic maps". Following Whorl, Donovan showed a series of exhibitions at Ace Gallery in Los Angeles, CA.

In 2003, she occupied the entire Ace Gallery space at 274 Hudson Street in New York with a series of ‘site-responsive’ installations, many of which have now come to define the artist's oeuvre. Examples include Haze (2003), which is composed entirely of translucent plastic drinking straws stacked against a wall and buttressed by the adjoining walls to create a monumental frieze with atmospheric effects. The floor installation Nebulous (2002) is made entirely of Scotch tape that has been unspooled and extemporaneously ‘woven’ into interconnected units. Transplanted (2001) expanded upon her previous projects with torn pieces of tar paper in order to create a monumental slab of material occupying a footprint of over 25-feet square. Strata (2000) is another expansive floor installation made of pooled and layered pieces of dried Elmer's glue. Moiré (1999) consists of large spools of adding machine paper that are manipulated and layered to form radiating patterns that shift with the position of the viewer. Colony (2000) is composed of cut pieces of standard pencils at various lengths, which are arranged on the floor to suggest the architectural sprawl of urban development. The exhibition received widespread critical acclaim, garnering reviews and profiles in The New York Times, Village Voice, Artforum, Art in America, Flash Art International, and W, among others.

A series of solo museum projects followed at venues such as Rice University Art Gallery in Houston, Museum of Contemporary Art San Diego, UCLA's Hammer Museum, Berkeley Art Museum, Museum of Contemporary Art Cleveland, and the Saint Louis Art Museum, among others.

Donovan says of her work, "It is not like I'm trying to simulate nature. It's more of a mimicking of the way of nature, the way things actually grow." Fellow artist Chuck Close told a reporter that "At this particular moment in the art world, invention and personal vision have been demoted in favor of appropriation, of raiding the cultural icebox. For somebody to go out and try to make something that doesn't remind you of anybody else's work and is really, truly innovative—and I think Tara's work is—that's very much against the grain of the moment. To me, it represents a gutsy move."

=== Pace Gallery ===
In 2005, Donovan joined Pace Gallery where her work was included in both a summer group show and the group exhibition Logical Conclusions: 40 Years of Rule-Based Art curated by Marc Glimcher. Her first major solo exhibition at Pace in 2006, Tara Donovan: New Work, presented Untitled (Plastic Cups), an installation of stacks of plastic cups assembled at a scale that suggested a rolling topographical landscape. Later that same year, she presented Tara Donovan: Rubber Band Drawings. She has since proceeded to debut most of her new projects in solo and group exhibitions at Pace and its global affiliate galleries in London, Beijing, Hong Kong, Seoul, Menlo Park, and Palo Alto, which include the following (among others):

- Light, Time and Three Dimensions, Pace Gallery, New York, June 28 – August 24, 2007
- Tara Donovan: New Drawings, Pace Gallery, New York, April 10 – May 2, 2009
- On the Square, Pace Gallery', New York, January 8 – February 13, 2010
- 50 Years at Pace, Pace Gallery, New York, September 17–October 16, 2010
- Tara Donovan: Drawings (Pins), Feb 12, 2011 – Mar 19, 2011 included more than twelve drawings composed of thousands of nickel-headed steel pins pierced into white gatorboard.
- Untitled (Mylar), May 4 – April 9, 2011
- Beijing Voice 2011: Leaving Realism Behind, November 9, 2011 – February 12, 2012
- Grounded, January 17 – February 22, 2014
- Tara Donovan, Pace Gallery, New York, May 22 – August 23, 2014
- Tara Donovan, Pace Gallery, New York, May 9 – July 8, 2015
- Talking on Paper, Pace in Beijing, April 17 – June 18, 2016
- Tara Donovan, Pace in Palo Alto, January 26 – March 26, 2017
- Chewing Gum II, Pace in Hong Kong, February 10 – March 11, 2017
- Tara Donovan, Pace Gallery, New York, February 17 – March 18, 2017
- Tara Donovan, Pace in Seoul, September 6 – October 22, 2017
- Tara Donovan: Compositions, Pace in London, January 24 – March 9, 2018

In addition to Pace, Donovan's work has been included in solo and group exhibitions at other galleries including Krakow Witkin Gallery in Boston, Reynolds Gallery in Richmond, Galerie Perrotin in Paris, Stephen Friedman Gallery in London, and Quint Gallery in La Jolla, among others.

=== Museum exhibitions ===
Donovan has produced many large-scale exhibitions at museums. One of the most notable is her 2007 exhibition at the Metropolitan Museum of Art in New York. Titled Tara Donovan at the Met, the project was the fourth in a series of projects with contemporary artists commissioned by the museum. She produced a site-responsive installation using loops of Mylar tape affixed in clusters to all of the walls of a gallery, which surrounded the viewers in a shifting, phenomenological experience as they moved through the space.

Donovan also had work as part of the Material Matters exhibition hosted by the Cornell University Herbert F. Johnson Museum of Art in 2005. This show featured the work of 20 artists who highlighted material and process but also drew from vocabulary of conceptual and minimalist art of the '60's and '70's. The featured work was a cube made with thousands of pins held together by friction and gravity.

Donovan's first major survey exhibition was produced by the Institute of Contemporary Art, Boston, where it opened in 2008. The exhibition traveled to the Cincinnati Art Center, the Des Moines Art Center, and the Museum of Contemporary Art San Diego throughout the rest of 2008 and 2009. In addition to new iterations of Haze, Nebulous, Strata, Moiré, Untitled (Plastic Cups), Untitled (Mylar Tape), and Untitled (Styrofoam Cups), the exhibition included examples of Bluffs (sculptures made of stacks of clear plastic buttons), Untitled (Paper Plates) (another series of sculptures that use the ridged edges of standard paper plates to form orbs that fuse together into crystalline-like clusters), and three of her cubes made of different materials: Untitled (Toothpicks), Untitled (Pins), and Untitled (Glass). Donovan also introduced museum audiences to newer projects such as Untitled (Mylar), which consists of folded sheets of Mylar condensed into spherical units, and Untitled, a wall-based installation that uses sheets of folded and compressed polyester film to construct a thick screen of material that plays with light, optics and perspective (a subsequent iteration of this project was commissioned for the Lever House Art Collection).

In 2010, Donovan worked with the Indianapolis Museum of Art to produce Tara Donovan: Untitled, an exhibition of many of her previous sculptural installation projects (including Ripple, Colony, Strata, Transplanted, and Untitled (Plastic Cups)) along with examples of many of her drawings and monoprints produced since 2000. In addition, the museum commissioned a large-scale version of Untitled (Mylar), which is now part of the collection.

In 2012, Donovan was invited by the Milwaukee Art Museum to participate in its series of contemporary artists’ projects. Currents 35: Tara Donovan featured new iterations of Haze and Untitled (Lever House Project) as well as examples from her new series of Drawings (Pins) (2011) and a new sculptural installation of clear acrylic rods assembled into spiky crystalline units that can be combined in different orientations to create a sprawling floor installation.

Donovan's first European museum exhibition was organized in 2013 by the Arp Museum in Remagen, Germany in collaboration with the Louisiana Museum of Modern Art in Humlebaek, Denmark. The exhibition presented a sampling of her installations and sculptural projects produced over the previous fifteen years.

In 2015, Donovan was invited by curator Andrea Grover to participate in the Parrish Museum's Platform initiative, which is a series of contemporary artists’ projects that respond to the architecture, context, and environmental conditions of the museum. Donovan presented new works related to her experiments with Slinkys (the children's toy) as both a sculptural and mark-making material. The artist was also invited to participate in her first UK-based exhibition at Jupiter Artland in Scotland where she presented a wall installation of Slinkys along with iterations of Untitled (Plastic Cups) and Untitled (Mylar). An installation of Donovan's monumental stacks of styrene cards (which previously debuted at Pace Gallery in 2014) was included in the Wonder exhibition at the Smithsonian Museum of American Art's Renwick Gallery, which opened in November 2015. The 2018 exhibition Hyperobjects at Ballroom Marfa—curated in collaboration with Timothy Morton—considered Donovan's work within a broad conceptual framework of geological time and the imprint of human activity and its material residue on the present and future.

Donovan's 2018 exhibition at the Museum of Contemporary Art Denver occupied the entire David Adjaye-designed building. Curator Nora Abrams combined Donovan's older and more recent two-dimensional and three-dimensional works in order to “open up new areas of dialogue within her practice and enable viewers to make connections across time and subject matter”. Including sculpture, drawings, works on paper, and site-responsive installations, the exhibition called attention to how Donovan's material experimentations result in a varied practice.

== Awards ==
- 2008, MacArthur Fellow, John D. and Catherine T. MacArthur Foundation
- 2005 Calder Prize, Calder Foundation
- 2004 Willard R. Metcalf Award, American Academy of Arts and Letters
- 2004 Presidential Award, Women's Caucus for Art

== Selected public collections ==
- Albright-Knox Art Gallery, Buffalo
- Birmingham Museum of Art, Alabama
- Brooklyn Museum of Art
- Centre Pompidou, Paris
- Dallas Museum of Art
- Indianapolis Museum of Art
- Institute of Contemporary Art Boston
- Los Angeles County Museum of Art
- Metropolitan Museum of Art, New York
- Museum of Contemporary Art, San Diego
- Museum of Fine Arts, Boston
- Parrish Art Museum, Watermill, NY
- Virginia Museum of Fine Arts, Richmond
- Wadsworth Atheneum Museum of Art, Hartford
- Whitney Museum of American Art, New York

== Selected publications ==
- Abrams, Nora Burnett (2018). Tara Donovan : fieldwork. New York: Rizzoli. ISBN 978-0-8478-6292-4.
- Donovan, Tara (2008). Tara Donovan (1st ed.). New York: Monacelli Press. ISBN 9781580932134.
- Donovan, Tara (2013). Tara Donovan. Humlebæk, Denmark: Louisiana Museum of Modern Art/DAP. ISBN 9788792877093.
- Tara Donovan exhibition catalogues, Pace Gallery
