= Peter Alexander (artist) =

American artist (1939–2020)

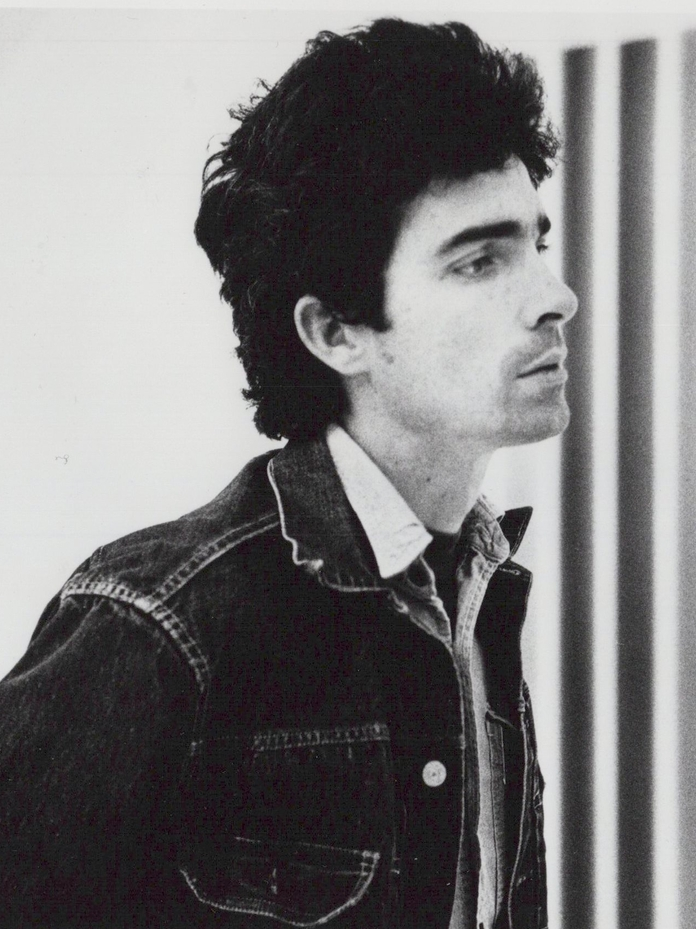
- Alexander in 1971
- Born: February 27, 1939; Los Angeles, California, U.S.
- Died: May 26, 2020 (aged 81); Santa Monica, California, U.S.
- Education: University of California, Los Angeles (BA, MFA)
- Known for: Sculpture, painting
- Movement: Light and Space
- Website: http://www.peteralexander.com

Peter Alexander (February 27, 1939 – May 26, 2020) was an American artist who was part of the Light and Space artistic movement in southern California in the 1960s. He is notable for his resin sculptures from the 1960s and 1970s.

== Early life and education ==
Alexander was born in Los Angeles on February 27, 1939, and was raised in Newport Beach. His family had been residing in Southern California for four generations and operated oil fields. He originally intended to go into architecture. He studied at the University of Pennsylvania (1957–1960); the Architectural Association in London (1960–1962); the University of California, Berkeley (1962–1963); the University of Southern California (1963–64); and the University of California, Los Angeles (1964–65 and 1965–66). At UCLA, he earned first a bachelor's degree in 1965, and then a Master of Fine Arts three years later.

== Career ==
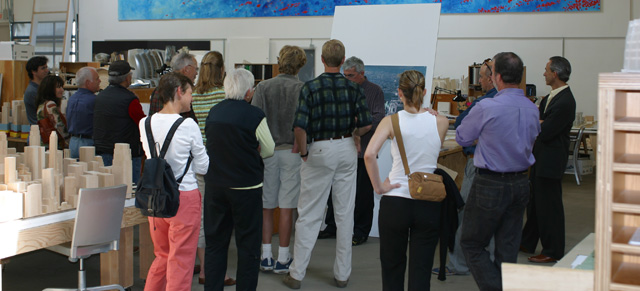
Alexander speaking in front of his mural Blue

After initially working as an architect, Alexander rose to prominence in the 1960s with translucent resin sculptures. He is credited as one of the key figures that galvanized the Light and Space movement onto the world stage, alongside his contemporaries Robert Irwin, Doug Wheeler, and Larry Bell. He did not receive the same recognition as them, however, partly because of the "varied nature" of his artistic endeavors. He also produced paintings, including a series that depicts luminous aerial views of the city lights stretching across the Los Angeles Basin. He was commissioned to paint a large mural for the Walt Disney Concert Hall in Los Angeles.

Alexander's art appears in the films Erin Brockovich, Terminator 3: Rise of the Machines and Shopgirl.

He was a longtime friend of Christopher Isherwood. A portrait of Alexander by Isherwood's longtime partner Don Bachardy has been displayed at the Laguna Art Museum.

In October 2011, the Craig Krull Gallery exhibited a survey of Alexander's work, including paintings and sculptures from 1970 to 2009 in conjunction with Pacific Standard Time. Alexander was exhibited in Pacific Standard Time museum shows as well, including "Civic Virtue: The Impact of the Los Angeles Municipal Art Gallery and the Watts Towers Arts Center", organized by the Los Angeles Department of Cultural Affairs, "Phenomenal: California Light and Space" at the Museum of Contemporary Art San Diego, and "Pacific Standard Time: Crosscurrents in L.A. Paintings and Sculpture 1945–1970" at the J. Paul Getty Museum.

== Themes ==
Alexander was a key figure in the Light and Space movement, with his sculptures tied to Minimalism. The two essential elements to his art were color and light. He was described as "one of the most extraordinary colorists" by curator Robin Clark, who also noted how his application of color was "sumptuous". His art also expressed the "intersection of natural and artificial light" typical of the late-20th century, regardless of the medium he used. It featured only illuminated atmosphere and never the Sun; this was characteristic of Light and Space. Although he utilized resin extensively in his early works, Alexander stopped working with the material around 1972 after it caused him to be hospitalized. He subsequently turned to painting during the next three decades, doing so on canvas, paper and velvet. The theme of these works was inspired by the landscape, light and other natural phenomena around his hometown.

Alexander only went back to producing sculptures after 2006, when one of his resin sculptures at the Centre Pompidou was destroyed before an exhibition. The museum not only compensated him for the sculpture, but also funded him to make a replacement. He was able to employ urethane, a less toxic material that was more effective at displaying pigment. He also began using acrylic at around the turn of the millennium.

== Awards ==
In 1980, he was awarded a fellowship from the National Endowment for the Arts.

== Selected collections ==
- Fogg Museum, Harvard University, Cambridge, Massachusetts
- Getty Museum, Los Angeles, California
- Henry Art Gallery, Seattle, Washington
- Los Angeles County Museum of Art, California
- Metropolitan Museum of Art, New York
- Minneapolis Institute of Contemporary Art, Minnesota
- Honolulu Museum of Art Spalding House (formerly The Contemporary Museum, Honolulu), Hawaii
- Museum of Modern Art, New York
- New York Public Library, New York
- Norton Simon Museum, Pasadena, California
- Princeton University Art Museum, New Jersey
- Museum of Contemporary Art San Diego, La Jolla, California
- San Francisco Museum of Modern Art, California
- Solomon R. Guggenheim Museum, New York
- Stanford University Art Museum, Palo Alto, California
- University of California, Berkeley
- University of California, Santa Barbara
- Vancouver Art Gallery, British Columbia, Canada
- Walker Art Center, Minneapolis, Minnesota

== Personal life ==
The brother of New York galerist Brooke Alexander, Peter Alexander lived in Santa Monica, California. He married twice, with two grown-up daughters from his first marriage and a son from his second to artist, Claudia Parducci. Alexander died on May 26, 2020, at his home in Santa Monica at the age of 81.
