= Casper Brindle =

American artist

Casper Brindle (born 1968) is an American painter and sculptor living and working in Los Angeles, California. Casper Brindle creates artwork that combines influences from both the light and space and finish fetish movements, as well as elements from Minimalism and Color Field painting. His work has been exhibited in the United States and internationally.

== Early life and education ==
Casper Brindle was born in Toronto, Canada in 1968 shortly after his parents emigrated there from England. The family relocated to Los Angeles in 1974. Brindle began painting at a young age, and described the work of Mark Rothko as an influence in his youth. In the late 1980s, he apprenticed with visual artist, Eric Orr, one of the founding members of the Light and Space and Finish Fetish movements.

== Career ==
=== Early work ===
Brindle's early works were abstract color field paintings to which the artist introduced elements of photography, poetry and light.

=== Dislocated Stratum series ===
The Dislocated Stratum series are expansive paintings made with layers of fine airbrushed sprays which are applied by hand and sealed with a high-gloss resin surface. Brindle creates gradations of color that shift in appearance depending on the viewer's location. Brindle uses industrial materials such as metal flake automotive paint, airbrush and resin, which were popularized by the Finish Fetish artists of the 1960s and 70s. The early Dislocated Stratum works had sections of wood inlay and sometimes LED light elements, that would cause the paintings to glow.

=== Aura series ===
The Aura series are monochromatic pieces that are said to function both as painting and relief wall sculpture. Brindle has applied gradations in the pearlescent paint that appear only from certain vantage points. These paintings sit over two inches off of the wall with beveled edges that are painted in neon colors, creating a halo of colorful light. At the center of each painting is a bar of metallic leaf.

=== Portal series ===
The Portal Series evolved from the Aura paintings that he debuted in late 2016. Sharing the central form of a bar of metallic leaf, the Portals diverge from Brindle's earlier monochromatic Aura paintings with their colors with gradients that radiate from light to dark.

=== Sculpture ===
In 2017, Brindle began producing large-scale kinetic sculptures that continue his experimentation with sensory perception. Lighting plays a dramatic role in the color-shifting quality of the sculptures, and these pieces are intended to function outdoors as well as indoors.

== Special projects ==
=== Superdesk ===
In 2014, Brindle collaborated with Los Angeles based Clive Wilkinson Architects on an office project for the Barbarian Group in Boston called the Superdesk. The 4,400 square foot serpentine shaped desk was able to accommodate up to 170 people. Brindle was brought in to cover the desktop with a surfboard-inspired resin topcoat that was poured continuously for 24 hours to maintain the desktop's continuity. The American Institute of Architects recognized the Barbarian Group's office and superdesk and seven other projects with the Institute Honor Awards for Interior Architecture in 2015.

== Exhibitions ==
Brindle's works have been exhibited solo or as part of a group. His works were exhibited in:

- Museum of Art and History Lancaster, Lancaster CA, Spirit of Summer – The Artists of Mana, June 21 – August 31, 2014, curated by Andi Campognone
- Art 1307 Villa Di Donato, Naples, Italy – Mana in Naples.

== Permanent collections ==
- Frederick R Weisman Art Foundation, Malibu, CA
- Morningside College, Sioux City, IA
