= Eric Minh Swenson =

Eric Minh Swenson, also known as EMS, (born 1971) is an American photographer, photojournalist and filmmaker, born in Honolulu, Hawaii, best known for his films on artists and exhibition. He has also focused on Southern California fine artists.

He has also made over 1500 short films which document artists and their processes, as well as their gallery and museum exhibitions. Subjects have included Chris Burden, Peter Shire, Cheech Marin, Lisa Adams, Gisela Colón and Don Bachardy.

Swenson has written, directed and produced four feature length narrative films and a documentary, Mana. Mana was shot on Hawaii's Big Island and explores how the ocean and family affect the lives of ten Southern California male artists. The filming concluded with an exhibition at Gallery MELD on Pawai Place in Kailua-Kona. Mana has screened at film festivals, museums, and internationally.
