= Frederick Spratt =

American painter (1927–2008)

- Born: June 15, 1927; Iowa, U.S.
- Died: April 29, 2008 (aged 80); San Jose, California, U.S.
- Education: M.A. Art, State University of Iowa, 1951
- Known for: Painting, Sculpture, Installation
- Movement: Light and Space
- Awards: 85th and 84th Annual Exhibition, S.F.A.A, San Francisco Museum of Art, 1966 and 1965
- Elected: Professor of Art Emeritus at San Jose State University, 1989
- Patrons: San Jose Museum of Art, San Jose Institute of Contemporary Art, Triton Museum, SFMOMA, De Saisset Museum

Frederick Spratt (1927 – April 29, 2008) was an American artist and educator, best known for his color theory paintings.

== Early life ==
Born in Iowa, Spratt was the grandson of a house painter from whom he received his first lessons in painting. He later built upon this early training during his adolescence as a sign painter. He received his MA in Studio Art from University of Iowa in 1951, and in 1954 he began teaching in the Art Department at San Jose State University, where he taught the American figurative artist, Robert Graham (1938–2008) in 1961. In 1962 he took a sabbatical in England for one year, where he lived and painted representationally in St. Ives Cornwall, United Kingdom. During this period he created several figurative and landscape paintings. He returned to San Jose, California, in 1963 and continued to teach at San Jose State University where he served as the Chairman of the Art Department and as the interim Dean of Humanities and Arts.

== Color theory painting ==
In 1970, he moved to Los Angeles and began to experiment with color theory, but continued teaching classes part-time at San Jose State University. Spratt was informed by the formalist art of Josef Albers, minimalist painting by Ellsworth Kelly and Ad Reinhardt, and abstract expressionist painting by Barnett Newman; his work was also deeply influenced by his early days as a sign painter. Spratt's color theory work is regarded for its mutability—changing with the available light, time of day and season of year, with each viewer and with each viewing. During the 1960s in Los Angeles, many California artists were creating work that focused on the surface qualities of a work of art—a tendency that generated the descriptive phrase "finish fetish"—an immaculate, glistening, often translucent surface which conveys the look of a refined industrial process. For thirty years he experimented with color theory in three main series: Semaphores, Scrolls and Diptychs, all of which are characterized by their flat application of acrylic lacquer onto aluminum. In 2004 Spratt described his artistic endeavor in the following way: “It seemed I was seeking a way to put paint in the service of art while freeing it from the harness of depiction or narration. To let color be its own narrative through its combination and by the palpability of painted fields.” Several of his paintings from the 1970s were exhibited nationally at O.K. Harris Gallery, New York City, San Francisco Museum of Modern Art, and at Janus Gallery, Los Angeles in 1976 and 1978, respectively. This same year he returned to San Jose and, after five short years, opened his own gallery—Frederick Spratt Gallery—in 1993 which operated until his death in 2008. Many of his remaining works belong to the permanent collection of the San Jose Museum of Art

== Exhibitions ==
- 1985 - Ten California Colorists, a group exhibition in 1985 that traveled to Redding Art Museum, San Jose Institute of Contemporary Art, Palm Springs Desert Museum, Montgomery Gallery at Pomona College and University Art Museum at the University of New Mexico.
- 2004 - The Triton Museum of Art in Santa Clara, California, mounted a solo exhibition of his color theory works entitled Trooping the Colors.
- 2008 - A retrospective—Fred Spratt: Color and Space— was held at the San Jose Museum of Art in San Jose, California.
- 2016 - "Artists in Residence: San Jose's 20th Century Vanguard" at the San Jose Museum of Art featured several of Spratt's large lacquer-on-aluminum paintings that make direct reference to the color work of Mark Rothko.
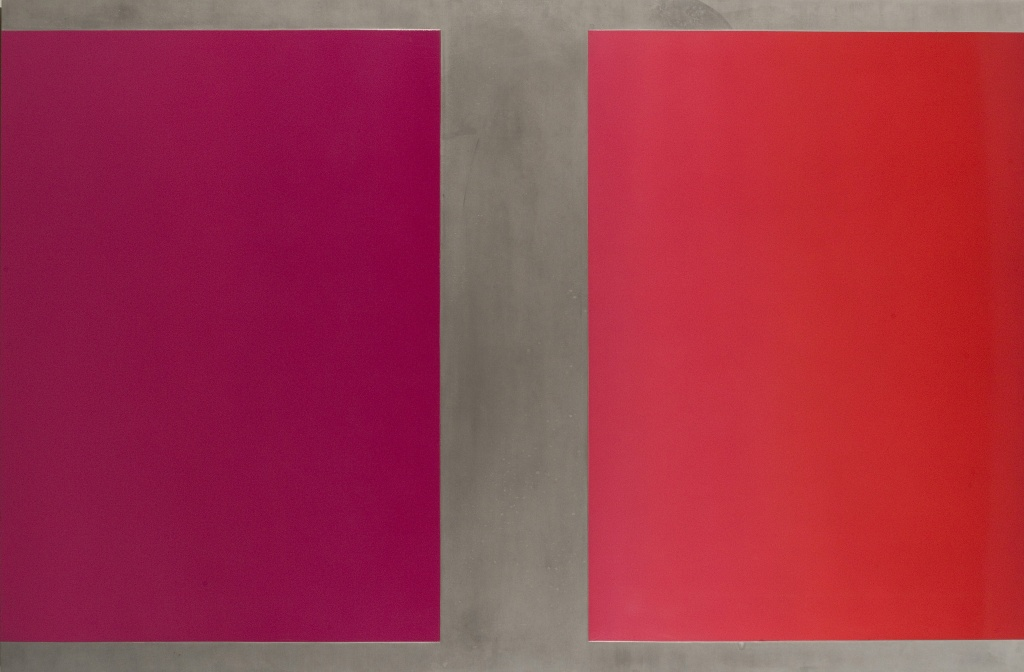
  Photograph of Frederick Spratt Big Red #1

== Personal life ==
Frederick Spratt is survived by his daughter Kris and sons Mike and Shahn Spratt.

== See also ==
- Color Theory
- Light and Space
- Monochrome painting
