= Helen Pashgian =

American visual artist

- Born: 1934 (age 91–92); Pasadena, CA
- Known for: Visual artist
- Movement: Light and Space

Helen Pashgian (born 1934) is an American visual artist who lives and works in Pasadena, California. She is a primary member of the Light and Space art movement of the 1960s, but her role has been historically under-recognized.

== Education ==
She received her B.A. from Pomona College in 1956, attended Columbia University from 1956–57, and received her M.A. from Boston University in 1958. While pursuing a Ph.D. at Harvard University in preparation for a career in academia or museum work, Pashgian taught an applied art class at a local high school and eventually transitioned into art-making.

== Work ==
Pashgian creates sculptures made of industrial materials such as resin, fiberglass, plastic, and coated glass. The luminous properties of these materials reflect her longstanding interest in the effects and perception of light. The artist has focused primarily on cast resin, "creating intimately scaled, translucent objects that incorporate vibrant colors and precisely finished surfaces. The perception of these works shifts as the viewer moves around them, and they seem at times to be solid forms and at others to be dissolving into space."

In the 1960s and 1970s, Pashgian, along with the artist Mary Corse, was one of only two female members of the California-based Light and Space movement. Other members include James Turrell and Robert Irwin (artist).

Some of her first sculptures are dated to the 1960s. Her early works mainly consisted of spheres made out of polyester resin, which would be present in her future solo exhibitions.

Her first solo exhibition was at Pomona College Museum of Art in Claremont, California, in 2010. The show, Helen Pashgian: Working in Light, consists of Untitled 2007-09, where it is green column structures made out of acrylic. The columns are paired and is illuminated by it the lighting inside of the sculpture, showing the objects that are imbedded into the columns.

Later in her career, Pashgian was invited to do more solo exhibitions. On March 30, 2014, Pashgian had a solo exhibition, Helen Pashgian: Light Invisible, at LACMA. The show consists of twelve acrylic columns are lined up in pairs in a dark room, known as Untitled 2012-13. Similar to the sculptures in the Pomona show, the only sources of light are coming from the columns themselves. The columns are paired together and spaced out in ten-foot intervals. On the outside, the acrylic creates a matte and opaque finish, and on the inside are objects that the artist did not disclose, letting the viewer to interpret themselves. Because the columns are the only light source, the display changes at each angle. As the viewer moves from one pair to another, the projections of the columns form a parabola creating continuity with each piece.

On November 4, 2021, the solo exhibition, Sphere and Lenses in Lehmann Maupin, New York, contained Untitled 2021. It is a lens sculpture that is forty-five inches in diameter and made of cast epoxy. The epoxy created a "frosted" effect giving texture and opaqueness to the lens. There is color in the center, and it dissipates along the radius. In addition, ambient lighting would be added set in intervals of five minutes triggered by movement.

Pashgian was invited to have another solo exhibition on November 19, 2021, Helen Pashgian: Presences, at SITE, Santa Fe, New Mexico. The exhibition starts with Pashgian spheres that were made in the 1960s that are lined up on an acrylic pedestal. Another work showcased was layered rectangles made out of acrylic and Untitled 2021 from Lehmann Maupin's show. One of the show's centerpieces is the installation of Helen's 2014 LACMA exhibit. The other main exhibit has the visitors wearing paper booties and immersing themselves in the installation, which involves the lighting and the room. A disk will illuminate, and the wall will project an image up to the visitor.

== Exhibitions ==
=== Group exhibitions ===
- 2006 - The Senses: Selections from the Permanent Collection, Pomona College Museum of Art, Claremont, CA
- 2006 - Translucence: Southern California Art from the 1960s and 1970s, Norton Simon Museum, Pasadena, CA
- 2010 - Primary Atmospheres: Works from California 1960 - 1970, David Zwirner Gallery, New York, NY
- 2012 - Pacific Standard Time: Crosscurrents in L.A. Painting and Sculpture, 1950-1970, Martin-Gropius-Bau, Berlin, Germany
- 2011–2012 - Phenomenal: California Light, Space, Surface, Museum of Contemporary Art San Diego, CA
- 2011–2012 - Pacific Standard Time: Crosscurrents in L.A. Painting and Sculpture, 1950-1970, J. Paul Getty Museum, Los Angeles
- 2013–2014 - Beyond Brancusi: The Space of Sculpture, Norton Simon Museum, Pasadena, CA
- 2014 - California Dreamin': Thirty Years of Collecting, Palm Springs Art Museum, Palm Springs, CA
- 2015 - Made in California, Mana Wynwood, Miami, FL
- 2018 - Water & Light, Ochi Gallery and Emily Friedman Fine Art, Ketchum, ID
- 2018–2019 - Space Shifters, Hayward Gallery, London, UK
- 2019 - Radiant Light and Expanded Space, Pearl Lam, Hong Kong, China
- 2019–2020 - Crystals in Art: Ancient to Today, Crystal Bridges Museum of American Art, Bentonville, AR
- 2021–2022 - Light & Space, Copenhagen Contemporary, Copenhagen, Denmark
- 2021 - Beyond the Light of East & West, The Korean Cultural Center, Los Angeles, CA
- 2021–2022 - Light Space Surface: Works from the Los Angeles County Museum of Art, Addison Gallery of American Art, Phillips Academy, Andover, MA
- 2024 Making Their Mark: Works from the Shah Garg Collection, Berkeley Art Museum and Pacific Film Archive (BAMPFA).

=== Solo exhibitions ===
- 2007- Palm Springs Art Museum, Palm Springs, CA
- 2010 - Helen Pashgian: Working in Light, Pomona College Museum of Art, Claremont, CA
- 2014 - Helen Pashgian: Light Invisible, Los Angeles County Museum of Art, CA
- 2019 - New Lenses and Spheres, Vito Schnabel Projects, St. Moritz, Switzerland
- 2019–2020 - Lehmann Maupin, Seoul, and Hong Kong
- 2021–2022 - Primavera, Benton Museum of Art at Pomona College, Claremont, CA
- 2021–2022 - Spheres and Lenses, Lehmann Maupin, New York
- 2021–2022 - Helen Pashgian: Presences, SITE Santa Fe, Santa Fe, NM
- 2021-2022 - Helen Pashgian: Spheres, Charlotte Jackson Fine Art, Santa Fe, NM
- 2025 - Helen Pashgian, Charlotte Jackson Fine Art, Santa Fe, NM

== Collections ==
Pashgian's work is represented in many prominent museum collections including the Norton Simon Museum, Pasadena, California; Los Angeles County Museum of Art (LACMA); Orange County Museum of Art; Pomona College Museum of Art; Cornell University; and the Portland Art Museum.

== Recognition ==
Although Pashgian has shown her work, steadily, in solo and group shows since the 1960s, she did not achieve the same widespread recognition as her male contemporaries. In 2013 she was a recipient of the Distinguished Women in the Arts award from the Museum of Contemporary Art Los Angeles (MOCA). She was an artist-in-residence at the California Institute of Technology from 1970–71, and received an individual artists grant from the National Endowment of the Arts in 1986. Pashgian joined the board of trustees of Pomona in 1987.

Her image is included in the iconic 1972 poster Some Living American Women Artists by Mary Beth Edelson.
