= Lisa Adams =

American painter

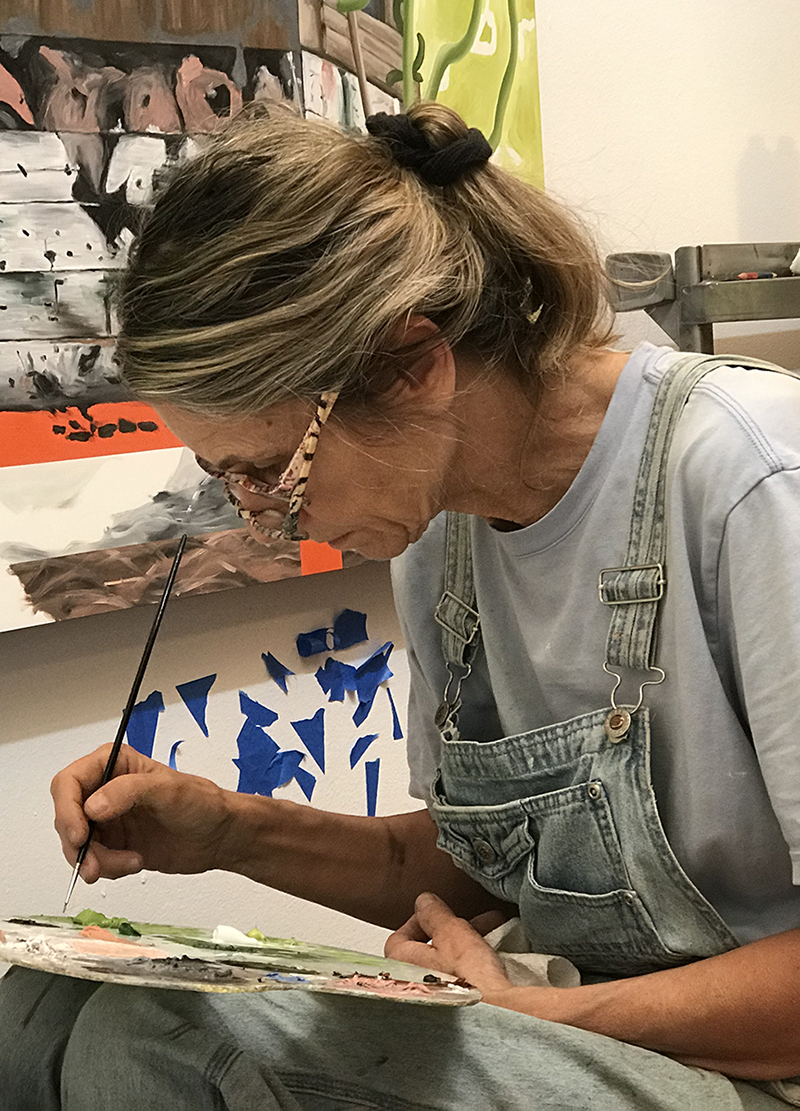
- Courtesy of the Artist
- Born: Lisa Adams; 1955 (age 70–71); Bristol, Pennsylvania, United States
- Education: B.A. 1977 Scripps College, Claremont, California; University of Heidelberg, Heidelberg, Germany; M.F.A. 1980 Claremont Graduate University, Claremont, California
- Known for: Painting
- Awards: Fulbright Award (1996), Brody Arts Fund Fellowship, Durfee ARC Grant

Lisa Adams (born 1955) is an American painter who emerged in the mid-1980s. She is best known for her oil paintings of imaginary worlds that address both personal and collective realities.

== Work and exhibitions ==
Combining images of dystopic environments and unlikely human-built structures, Lisa Adams is best known for her oil paintings of imaginary worlds that address both personal and collective realities. Though her work is not directly about issues resulting from climate change or ecological disaster, her paintings reference a significant shift in our thinking and our planet. They establish a link between the realms of abstraction and representation, of the imaginary and the real, and finally of the natural and human-built worlds. Rather than presenting a factual truth, her work operates between metaphor and pure imagination to successfully fuse these aspects into a new reality.

Lisa Adams' work has been exhibited nationally and internationally and was represented from 2010 to 2018 by CB1 Gallery in Los Angeles where she mounted five solo exhibitions. Among other press, her 2013 exhibition Second Life was reviewed in the LA Times by Holly Myers. Her most recent solo exhibition, A Piebald Era, ran from January 12 to February 17, 2019, at Garis & Hahn in downtown Los Angeles.

== Early influences and work ==
Adams knew she would be an artist at age ten after seeing a reproduction of Salvador Dalí's The Persistence of Memory. She also recalls being fascinated by the Charles and Ray Eames short film Powers of Ten and by a Karl Benjamin non-objective painting when she was thirteen years old.

In 1981, shortly after graduating from the Claremont Graduate University, Adams and artist Craig Kauffman moved to SoHo in New York City. She often referred to that time as her real education, where she was influenced by artists such as Susan Rothenberg and Julian Schnabel. Adams' work was included in group exhibitions in the East Village and SoHo.

In 1985 she returned to Los Angeles and continued to pursue her career as a painter. Adams painted abstractly for over a decade, eventually experimenting with unconventional art materials, such as linoleum and caulking. She also learned how to weld and woodwork, incorporating steel and shaped panels as integral elements in her paintings. She thought of her investigations into this hybrid form of artwork as "wall dependent" sculpture. In the early 2000s Adams received a Durfee ARC Grant to pursue experiments in video work.

== Public art, residencies and special projects ==
In addition to her studio practice Adams has worked on public art projects which have included the West Valley Branch Library in Reseda, California, the Fire Station No. 64 in Watts, Los Angeles and her most recent public art project is the Chatsworth Station for the Los Angeles Metro Orange Line Extension completed in June 2012.

As an artist-in-residence, Adams has lived and worked in Slovenia, Finland, Japan, the Netherlands and Costa Rica and has traveled extensively throughout Europe and Asia.

She has worked as an independent curator, who in 2000, co-founded Crazy Space, an alternative exhibition space, in Santa Monica, California.

In the 1990s Adams was commission by BMW of North America to paint an ArtCar and has been included in A Day in the Life of the American Woman: How We See Ourselves, Bullfinch Press, 2005.

== Academic experience ==
Adams has taught at many reputed art departments throughout the Los Angeles area and abroad, including University of Southern California, Claremont Graduate University, Academy of Fine Arts and Design, Ljubljana, Slovenia, UCLA Extension, Otis College of Art & Design and the Santa Monica College of Design, Art and Architecture where she authored a book titled FM*, (Peeps Island Press, 1999) a How To book about painting, based on her teachings between 1997 and 1999. She has also conducted workshops at the World Design Studios in Gifu City, Japan, the Idyllwild Arts Academy and Summer Arts at California State University, Fresno.

== Collections and media ==
In 2012, two short films were produced about Adams and her working process. The first is by Eric Minh Swenson titled Toxic Sky and the second is part of a video series by Joseph Santarromana titled The Remembers, episode 3.

Her first monograph book titled Vicissitude of Circumstance was published by Zero+ Publishing and James Scarborough's essay that appears in the book was published on the Huffington Post.

Lisa Adams work is in the public collections of the Frederick R. Weisman Museum, the Laguna Museum of Art, the Denver Art Museum, and the San Jose Museum of Art.
