= Doug Wheeler =

American artist (born 1939)

- Born: December 29, 1939 (age 85); Globe, Arizona, U.S.
- Movement: Light and Space

Doug Wheeler (born December 29, 1939) is an American artist. Wheeler is considered a founder of the so-called Light and Space movement that was centered in Southern California in the 1960s and 1970s. His works include drawings, paintings and installations that experiment with the perception and experience of space, volume and light. In his works, Wheeler’s controlled use of light and sound create a sensory impression of infinite space or pure silence, such as the recent “PSAD: Synthetic Desert III”, a soundproof dome installation at the Guggenheim Museum in New York in 2017 that gave viewers “a newfound appreciation for the beauty of silence.”

== Early life ==
Wheeler was born on December 29, 1939, in Globe, a small mining town in central Arizona, to Dr. Norman O. Wheeler and Edith Wehtje Wheeler. He spent all of his childhood in the high desert of Arizona, an environment that went on to influence his ideas about space: “I used to lie down on my back when I was in Arizona and you could see the zillions of stars and the vault…up there. I’d have to hold on to [bunch grass or] something because I was afraid that I would float right up into that and gravity would not hold me…. I was conscious of the planet in the sense of light.”

Wheeler's father was a prominent traveling surgeon and a general aviation pilot. As a boy, Wheeler often flew his father’s planes, and went on to train as a pilot, which he cited as having a great influence on him.

== Early career ==
Following high school, Wheeler drew frequently. After working on his portfolio independently for a handful of years, he enrolled in the Chouinard Art Institute in Los Angeles (known today as CalArts) in 1961, graduating in 1965. During this time he studied illustration and advertising design, eventually making his way toward painting.

Wheeler set up a studio in Venice beach in the late 1960s and began experimenting with different materials in his paintings, such as spray paint, leading to the breakthrough of his absolute light environment in 1967.

The artist’s earliest “light environment” to be presented outside the studio was the 1969 installation Environmental Light at the Stedelijk Museum. The work incorporated a "light wall”— using a single row of daylight neon light embedded inside a viewing aperture that encompassed the entire dimension of the gallery wall within an enclosed space. He stretched a nylon scrim to create a luminous “ceiling” that captured and reflected light and appeared to float above the room.

Several of Wheeler’s environmental projects from the 1960s and 1970s were realized, but many projects from this period exist only as detailed architectural plan drawings.

The noted Italian collector of American post-war art, Giuseppe Panza di Biumo was an enduring supporter of Wheeler’s and acquired the drawings of this period in 1975.

During the late 1960s, Wheeler began working on his Encasements, slender squares of monochrome plastic with neon lights embedded along the edges, intended to be installed in white rooms with coved corners. These paintings are made from fabricated acrylic and neon that blur the line between wall works and immersive environments. Only 20 total were made, and five–the most shown together at any time— were exhibited at David Zwirner Gallery in New York in 2016.

== Later career ==
Wheeler's later career included numerous significant solo exhibitions and installations of Wheeler’s environmental works.

In 2012, at the age of 72, Wheeler was the subject of his first solo exhibition in New York, Doug Wheeler, at David Zwirner Gallery, New York. It was widely lauded for its seamless luminous installation, within which within which light replicates the transition from dawn to dusk which also marked the city’s first infinity room environment of this scale.

Wheeler has continued to explore similar effects by manipulating architecture in distinct ways and with different types of lighting, creating installations, including DN ND WD 180 EN - NY 24the present work (2024) that explore the perceptual possibilities of light and space, and in which the viewer experiences the sensation of entering an infinite void.

== Recognition ==
Wheeler was the subject of a major exhibition the Guggenheim in 2017, PSAD Synthetic Desert III, in which the gallery was transformed into a hermetically sealed, silent, “semi-anechoic chamber.”

The work was based on drawings from the 1960s, and Wheeler has described the particular challenge of realizing the installation: “being able to isolate a museum from the sound around it and in it is really a challenge. When I first walked in here, even before construction, I knew that it was going to be a very hard thing to do.”

Even with his notable early success, the particular uniqueness of his works has made them complex to install and therefore fewer in frequency.

Wheeler’s work is held in numerous public collections worldwide, the Hirshhorn Museum and Sculpture Garden, Washington, D.C.; Los Angeles County Museum of Art; Museum of Contemporary Art, Los Angeles, Museum of Contemporary Art, San Diego; Orange County Museum of Art, Newport Beach, California; San Francisco Museum of Modern Art; Solomon R. Guggenheim Museum, New York; and the Stedelijk Museum Amsterdam.

== Personal life ==
Wheeler currently resides in Santa Fe, New Mexico and Los Angeles, California with his wife, the film producer Bridget Johnson.
