= Lita Albuquerque =

American artist

- Born: Santa Monica, California
- Education: University of California, Los Angeles; Otis College of Art and Design
- Known for: Environmental art
- Style: Sculpture

Lita Albuquerque is an American installation, environmental artist, painter and sculptor. She is a part of the core faculty in the Graduate Fine Art Program at Art Center College of Design.

== Early life ==
Lita Albuquerque was born in Santa Monica, California and raised in Tunisia, North Africa and Paris, France. At the age of eleven she settled with her family in the U.S. She graduated with a BFA from University of California, Los Angeles, and studied at the Otis College of Art and Design from 1971 to 1972.

== Career ==
In the 1970s, Albuquerque emerged on the California art scene as part of the Light and Space and Land Art movements. She gained national attention in the late 1970s.

In 1980, Albuquerque received attention for her installation, The Washington Monument Project, as featured in the International Sculptural Conference. The recognition this work gained, led to awards and commissions at major sites around the world, including the Great Pyramids, where she represented the United States at the International Cairo Biennale with her installation and exhibition Sol Star which won the prestigious Cairo Biennale Prize. In 2006 Albuquerque was awarded a National Science Foundation Grant and lead a team of artists and scientists on a journey to Antarctica where she created a large scale ephemeral artwork on the continent entitled Stellar Axis: Antarctica. The piece consisted of 99 ultramarine blue spheres, of varying sizes, that were installed on the Ross ice shelf, their positions and sizes correlating to the constellations and specific stars above.

Albuquerque has created site specific installations in the past two decades including works in the South Dakota Badlands, Death Valley and the Mojave Desert. Her paintings reflect ideas about color, light and perception. She uses pure pigments, gold leaf and copper.

Albuquerque has been commissioned to work in locations including: Gannett Publishers, McLean, Virginia; The Evo De Concini Federal Courthouse, Tucson, AZ; Palos Verdes Central Library, CA; Koll/Obayashi Corporation, Los Angeles, CA; Cerritos Public Library, Cerritos, CA; Tochigi Prefecture Health Center, Japan; Saitama Guest Center, Saitama, Tokyo, and the Library at the Tokyo University of Foreign Studies amongst numerous other sites.

Albuquerque, with architect Mitchell De Jarnett, installed Golden State, the largest public art commission in California State government history, a plaza design spanning two city blocks at the center of the Capitol Area East End Complex in Sacramento. Albuquerque completed Celestial Disk, a star map, sculpture and waterfall in collaboration with architect Robert Kramer, which provides the main entrance to the Cathedral of Our Lady of the Angels, Los Angeles. She worked with architect Cesar Pelli on a sculptural floor installation for the New Minneapolis Central Library, and with architect David Martin, has completed a glass pathway, star map and water wall disk for the Wallace Chapel at Chapman University in Orange, CA.

She is the recipient of grants and awards including the Cairo Biennale Prize at the Sixth International Cairo Biennale, and the esteemed Civitella Ranieri Foundation Fellowship in the Visual Arts, Perugia, Italy (2002).

== Exhibitions ==
Numerous solo exhibitions include: a career survey at Santa Monica Museum of Art; Mary Ryan Gallery, N.Y.; Dorothy Goldeen Gallery, Santa Monica (1995); Louis Stern Fine Arts; Marianne Deson Gallery, Chicago; Diane Brown Gallery, Washington D.C.; Lerner Heller Gallery, N.Y.; Robin Cronin Gallery, Houston; Akhnaten Galleries, Cairo; and USC Fisher Museum of Art, L.A.

Her museum exhibition history includes Hirshhorn Museum, Washington D.C.; San Francisco Museum of Art; Musée d'Art Moderne, Paris; Asahi Shimbun, Tokyo; Corcoran Gallery of Art, Washington D.C.; National Gallery of Modern Art, New Delhi; Los Angeles County Museum of Art; and Museum of Contemporary Art, L.A.

== Collections ==
Albuquerque's work is included in

- Archives of American Art at the Smithsonian Institution
- Whitney Museum of American Art
- Museum of Contemporary Art, Los Angeles
- J. Paul Getty Museum
- Frederick Weisman Foundation
- LACMA
- Orange County Museum of Art
- Laguna Art Museum
- Palm Springs Desert Museum
