= Nancy Macko =

American artist

- Born: 1950 (age 74–75); Oceanside, New York, US
- Education: University of California, Berkeley, University of Wisconsin–River Falls
- Known for: Feminist art, environmental art, photography, installation art, printmaking, video
- Spouse: Jan Blair
- Website: Nancy Macko Photography

Nancy Macko, Meadow, digital output on vinyl, 12' X 36', 2015.

Nancy Macko (born 1950) is an American visual artist based in California. She is known for photography, multimedia and installations that explore relationships between flora and fauna, nature and technology, art and science, and matriarchy and social rebirth. Her work is rooted in 1970s feminist models of artmaking that emphasized cooperation, interconnection and themes typically associated with women, such as fertility, nurturance and protection. She has drawn inspiration from disparate sources, including honeybee society, goddess myths, matriarchal cultures, the feminist utopias of science fiction, and mathematical and scientific investigations of the cosmos. In a 2015 review of Macko's exhibition, "The Fragile Bee," Stephen Nowlin wrote, "In various parts an eco-awareness and empathetic appreciation of nature, a feminist allegory and scientific study of symbiotic networks, Macko's poetic engagement with bees is both activist and passionate, and evocative of how tentacles from the ancient memes reach into our present."

Macko has exhibited at institutions including the Los Angeles County Museum of Art (LACMA), Los Angeles Municipal Art Gallery, Lancaster Museum of Art and History, Portland Art Museum and A.I.R. Gallery. Her work belongs to the public collections of the Metropolitan Museum of Art, LACMA, and Fine Arts Museums of San Francisco, among others.

== Early life and career ==
Macko was born in Oceanside, New York on Long Island in 1950. She studied art at CUNY Queens College in the mid-1970s, before transferring to the University of Wisconsin–River Falls and receiving a BS in 1977. She continued her studies at the University of California, Berkeley, where she was influenced by artist Sylvia Lark and earned an MA (1980) and an MFA (1981). During this time, she met feminist artist Judy Chicago and contributed to the making of her well-known work, The Dinner Party, in Santa Monica in 1979.

Macko's early paintings and monotypes were largely formal, minimal investigations of centralized forms—frequently diagrammatic, single trapezoids that transformed across diptych and triptych formats (e.g., the "Threshold Series," 1984) In the pastel-colored "Shifting Cycles" paintings (1986–88), she pieced together panels, fragmented forms and abstract stripes that suggested boundaries, and more evocatively, tall grasses or flames. Her "Objects of Power" series (1985) was a departure, depicting cropped, archetypal and symbolic items (often luck objects, such as a wishbone or horseshoe) emerging out of black backgrounds. These more personal, metaphorical paintings exploring belief systems and the unconscious pointed toward her mature work.

== Work and reception ==
Macko's wide-ranging work has often taken the form of a quest for identity (recalling feminist artists like Ana Mendieta and Mary Beth Edelson), human interdependence and harmony, that she seeks through the recovery of an archaic, feminine past or in the order and design of nature. Critic Gloria Feman Orenstein wrote, Macko's "oeuvre as a whole tells the story of a cosmogenesis, of the rebirth of a lost civilization and its values embedded in the mother-daughter bond … [she] understands how the erasure and denial of our matriarchal history have resulted in our own psychic disturbances, creating a world that is now out of balance." The layering of disparate imagery, forms and media has been intrinsic to Macko's art from her early printmaking and painting through later multidisciplinary installations and digital works, in which she has repurposed her own imagery. Her strategy of weaving together vocabularies from diverse investigations—involving honeybees, the life cycles of women, flowers or organic matter, ancient goddesses, and geometric, mathematical or cosmological forms— visually reinforces a key, enduring ecofeminist theme of interconnectedness.

=== Honeybee-focused projects (1991–2008) ===
Nancy Macko, The Honeycomb Wall, mixed media, archival digital prints, vinyl signage affixed to 98 hexagonal wooden panels each 11.5" diameter, 14' x 20' approx., 1993-–94.

In the early 1990s, Macko began to draw upon honeybee society for her work's content, structure, metaphorical framework and material, which at times included wax, pollen and honey. She initially engaged with the philosophical implications of honeybees' successful, female-governed social structures, relating them to feminist utopias, matriarchal cultures, and women's community, spirituality and sexuality. She also integrated the orderly central structure of beehives and honeycombs—the hexagon (also the molecular structure of glucose)—which served as an elegant visual metaphor for conveying interdependence. Artweek's Jeanne Willette identified transformation as a key theme in this work—of digital information into art, technology into ritual, science into magic, and a primeval female mode of existence into one of contemporary relevance.

Macko's first large installation, Dance of the Melissae (1993, Brand Library & Art Center), presented a multi-sensory cosmology of wall reliefs, found-object sculpture and digital and handmade images employing sound, scent, taste and visuals to convey the feminine potency of nature, bees and regeneration. The installation took the form of an ancient temple that she based on research into matriarchal cultures, women of the Bible and mythology; its elements included: imagery combining queen bees, bee priestesses, abstracted goddesses and the honeycomb form; eleven displays of bee-related objects perched on pedestals (Stations of the Goddess); a hexagonal floor sculpture made of wax and lead; and Honeycomb Wall, 98 panels containing objects, images and text related to honeybees and the geometry, chemistry and history of honey.

In two multidisciplinary video installations, Macko combined metaphorical, layered imagery and audio experimentation. Lore of the Bee Priestess (1992–04) was a visual narrative portraying a newly awakened "bee priestess" attempting to recover the ancient power of a now-lost matriarchal culture indoctrinated by bees, which revered female creativity, nature and peace. Presented as a trans-historical odyssey of both social and identity construction, it interwove Macko's characteristic bee imagery, symbolic objects and locations from around the world, and enacted rituals referencing feminine archetypes such as the mother, courtesan, Amazon and psychic. In "Bee Stories" (2006), Macko created a fractured, kaleidoscopic effect, using hexagonal shapes inscribed with bee-related visuals and a soundtrack of ambient nature and stories about bees narrated in foreign languages that merged in a drone-like cacophony. Reviews described it as a gentle immersion in unfamiliar cultures—temporally, back to an ancient lost utopia, and aurally, through its hypnotic soundtrack.

Nancy Macko, Video still from Lore of the Bee Priestess, video installation, 2004.

In the 2000s, Macko explored connections between bees, the cosmos and mathematics. Her "Feminist Utopias: New Constellations" series (2000–04) depicted a mythological skyscape of beehives, winged angels, tethered astronauts and matristic constellations painted, stamped and stenciled on birchwood panels or prints. In the exhibitions "Interstices: Prime Deserts" (2003), "Hive Universe" (2006–7) and "Hive Moments" (2008), Macko complemented her apian imagery with mathematical perspectives suggesting a universe coherent and comprehensible in terms of systems, yet open to the flux of inner experience and nature. For example, in The First Ten Prime Numbers, Suite II (2006), clusters of circles visualizing primes evoked symmetry, bee production, and cellular and celestial connections.

"Hive Universe" (Los Angeles Municipal Art Gallery) was Macko's first survey, gathering over sixty images and structures spanning various media and more than a decade's work; it was part of the national Feminist Art Project. Art historian Mary Davis MacNaughton wrote of the show, "Ultimately Macko's art links past and present, archaic bee priestesses and contemporary feminism, to present a vision of the future in which the human quest for domination is replaced by a search for harmony."

=== Flora and bee-focused work (2008–present) ===
In the latter 2000s, Macko turned to photography examining the life cycles of bee-attracting vegetables and flora and their complex reciprocal relationships. Her "Intimate Spaces" series (2005–14) centered on plant life captured with a handheld macro lens that magnified details and emphasized simultaneously occurring dualities of growth and decay (e.g., swelling stamens and shrinking petals) and beauty and fragility. ArtScene described the images as exploding in a "tapestry of vibrant color" with both subtle and pronounced shapes and textures.

In "The Fragile Bee" project, Macko confronted human behavior and the ecological threats to bees due to colony collapse disorder—widely considered the result of persistent use of neonicotinoid pesticides in agriculture. She established a garden for native bee-attracting plants, enabling her to document their stages of life throughout the year. These images became the "Botanical Portraits" suite (2014–15), which employed a compelling use of scale and hexagonal facet inserts that framed details, creating perceptual shifts of space, time and attention. The billboard-scaled work Meadow depicted the near-abstract blur of color and texture of a distant field of wildflowers punctuated with facets of particularized, magnified moments—e.g., a bee entering the recesses of a flower—revealing the complexity of dynamic organic processes. These works were part of "The Fragile Bee," initially presented at the Lancaster Museum of Art and History in 2015, and subsequently at sixteen venues throughout the US as of 2023, including the Hilliard Art Museum and Peggy Notebaert Nature Museum (Chicago). The exhibition also included video and the 105-panel mixed-media installation, Honey Teachings: In the Mother Tongue of the Bees.

=== Additional projects ===
Nancy Macko, Odalisque, archival digital print, 42" x 65", 2020.

Macko's other projects, have examined the continuity of women's experience, mother-daughter relationships, and cycles of life. The lithographic series "Divine Reading Lesson" (2011) juxtaposed repurposed flower patterns from her grandmother's wallpaper with long-running symbols such as beehives, circles, and most centrally, the feminine- or bee-shaped plumb bob. Between 2011 and 2014, she exhibited the digital collage series "Hopes and Dreams", which addressed aging and memory loss—changes she witnessed as they affected her mother. Macko chronicled the arc of her mother's life from youth to cognitive decline through collaged and altered biographical elements (vintage snapshots, handwriting, religious and floral imagery) whose layered abstract quality ultimately gave way to disintegration, fading and a disorder evoking the discomfort, confusion and agitation of dementia. Writer Stacy Davies described the series as "a kaleidoscope of memory, awash in color and laden with symbolism, eliciting a poignant emotional response to both their beauty and their heartbreak."

With the series "Decompositions" (2021), Macko synthesized longtime themes involving change and transformation, natural life cycles, metaphor and reality, through photographs of the contents of her garden compost pile that hovered between abstract, amorphous forms and recognizable organic scraps. Critic Eleanor Heartney described them as arresting images of "in-betweenness," whose "delicious state of indeterminacy" evoked mysterious landscapes, human bodies, sea creatures, folds of fabric and art-historical referents such as Hieronymus Bosch and Jackson Pollock.

=== Other professional activities ===
Macko has also taught, curated and written on art and technology, feminist pedagogy and women's experience, among other subjects. A member of the faculty at Scripps College since 1986, she served as chair of the art and art history department from 1998 to 2003, chair of the gender and women's studies department from 2004 to 2011, and established the school's digital art program in 1990.

== Recognition ==
Macko's work belongs to the public collections of the Fine Arts Museums of San Francisco, Hammer Museum, LACMA, Metropolitan Museum of Art, North Dakota Museum of Art, Portland Art Museum, Newport Art Museum, Rhode Island School of Design Museum, Riverside Art Museum and Virginia Center for the Creative Arts, among other institutions.

She has received grants from the Center for Cultural Innovation and the Andrew W. Mellon Foundation, and artist residencies from the Banff Centre for the Arts, Musée des Beaux-Arts de Pont-Aven (France), North Dakota Museum of Art and Virginia Center for the Creative Arts, among others.
