= Gisela Colón =

American sculptor (born 1966)

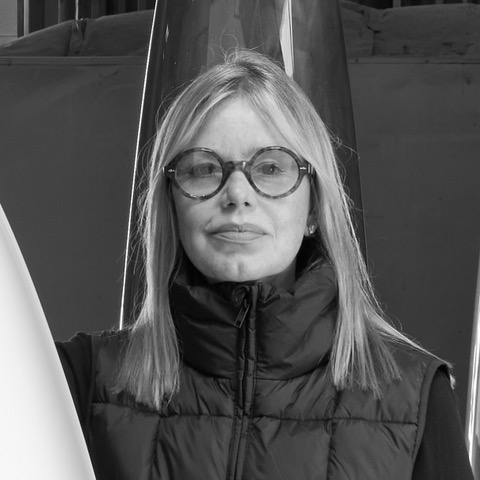
- Born: Gisela Colón; 1966 (age 59–60); Vancouver, Canada
- Education: University of Puerto Rico (BA); Southwestern Law School (JD)
- Known for: Sculpture
- Awards: Harry S. Truman Scholarship; Warhol Foundation Grant Recipient

Gisela Colón (born 1966) is a Puerto Rican American visual artist whose works traverse land interventions, sculpture, painting, video, and photography. Her practice of organic minimalism addresses the entanglement of ecological phenomena, personal and ancestral memory, and the relationship between cultural anthropology and the natural world.

== Early life and education ==
Colón was born in Vancouver, Canada, in 1966 to a German mother and Puerto Rican father. Her mother was a painter who studied languages and art at the University of Alberta in Edmonton, and her father was a scientist who obtained a Ph.D. in chemistry from the Simon Fraser University, Vancouver. She was raised in San Juan, Puerto Rico since the age of one, and attended the University of Puerto Rico, graduating magna cum laude in 1987 with a B.A. in economics, after receiving a 1986 Congressional Scholarship Award by the Harry S. Truman Foundation. Colón moved to Los Angeles in 1987 to pursue graduate studies, receiving a Juris Doctor degree from the Southwestern University School of Law in 1990.

== Early work ==
Colón began her career as a painter, exhibiting abstract works from 1997 to 2011. In 2012, Colón moved into sculpture, focusing on perceptual phenomena.

=== Organic Minimalism ===
Organic Minimalism is a term of art coined in 2018 by Colón to describe her artistic practice of imbuing organic lifelike qualities into a vocabulary of minimal reductive forms, expanding and deconstructing the traditional male-dominated canon of minimalism, land art, and the Light and Space. The practice of Organic Minimalism is said to draw raw energy from visible and invisible worlds, incorporating as materia prima the laws of physics, the intrinsic life force emanating from planet Earth, the powerful generative forces radiating throughout the cosmological realm, and the sublime mysteries of the quantum universe beyond.

Colón’s work is grounded in a worldview that links feminist philosophy, ecological vitality, and material transformation. She interprets feminism not as a narrow sociopolitical category but as a universal life force, extending beyond human experience to include plants, animals, and planetary ecosystems. Her emphasis on interconnected energy reflects a belief that all organic and inorganic matter participates in a continuous cycle of emergence and regeneration. This expanded feminist framework is informed by Colón’s upbringing in Puerto Rico, where she experienced nature as a dynamic, abundant presence. She frequently cites the resilience of the natural world—such as a weed breaking through asphalt—as an emblem of feminine generative power. Colón views her sculptures as conduits for this force: objects that embed light, activate space, and signal transformation.

== Work ==
Colón's oeuvre encompasses several distinct sculptural forms: Pods, Monoliths, Slabs, Light Portals, and Unidentified Objects. The through-line in all of Colón's work is the concept of the "mutable object." Influenced by Donald Judd's ideas and writings, such as his seminal essay "Specific Objects" (1964, published 1965), Colón refers to her works as "non-specific objects" to highlight their deliberate fluid indeterminacy. The sculptures are conceived as "non-specific objects" that transmute their physical qualities through fluctuating movement, varied lighting, changing environmental conditions, and the passage of time.

=== Pods ===
Ultra Spheroid (Gold Aqua)", 2017, blow-molded acrylic, 90x42x12 inches, 229x107x33 cm, Perez Art Museum Miami (PAMM).

Colón produces incandescent sculptures generally referred to as "Pods." In 2012 Colón began working with plastics, developing a unique fabrication process of blow-molding and layering various acrylic materials. This industrial process creates dynamic sculptures that fluctuate in appearance, emanating light and color inherently from within. The Pods shift color and form before the viewers' eyes depending on lighting, and the viewers' choice of location.

=== Monoliths ===
Colón creates large-scale floor-based sculptures called "Monoliths," 12-foot tall vertical singular-form sculptures, engineered with aerospace technology, possessing no lines, corners, edges, or demarcations, conceived as pure form to denote clarity and aesthetic purity. The Monoliths have "allusive shimmering surfaces" that have been described as "phallic shaped pieces," "ambiguous works that defy categorization. The pieces have a presence and a resonance, and Colón succeeds in fashioning unsolvable optical illusions that inspire wonder far beyond their formal properties." Representing a new direction for Colón, the Monolith sculptures are 12-foot-tall iridescent pillars that "succeed in providing viewers with a dramatic perceptual experience...Radiant, elegant and pristine, [they] manage to be both strong and sensuous.

The first Monolith of this series, created in 2016, is in the permanent collection of the Los Angeles County Museum of Art (LACMA).

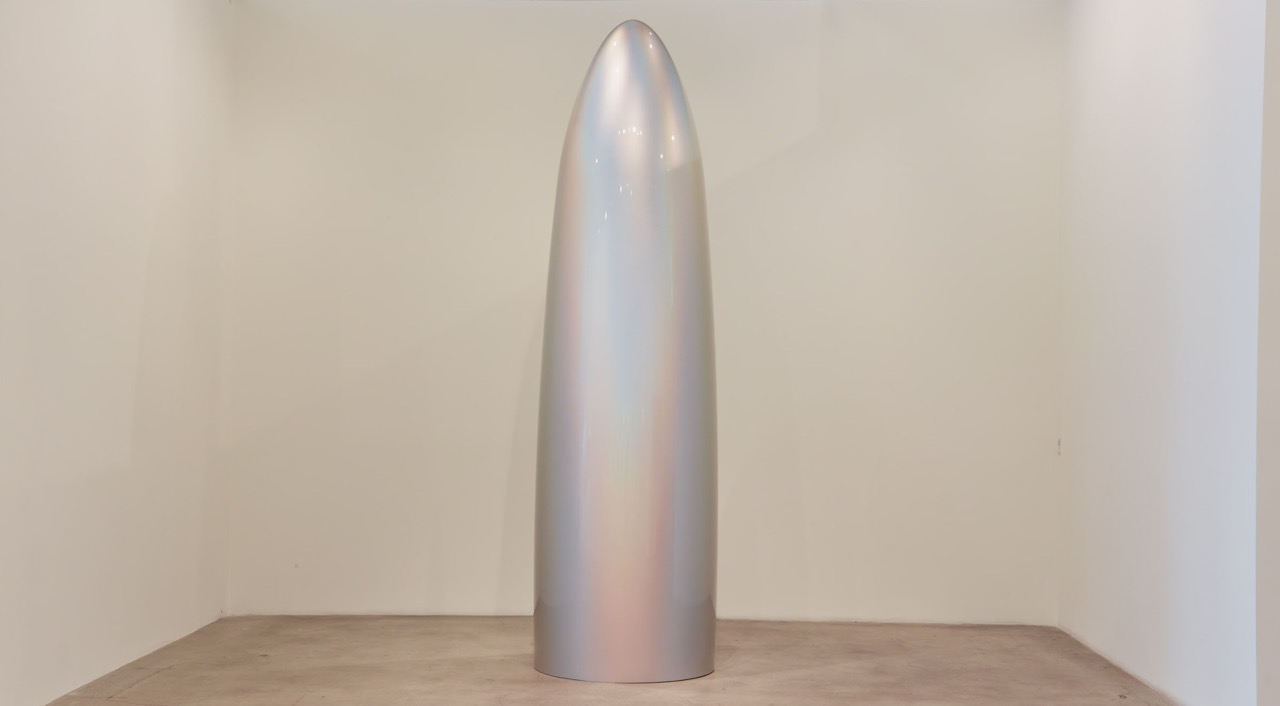
Gisela Colon, "Untitled (Monolith Silver)", 2016, engineered aerospace carbon fiber, 144x40x40 inches, 365.76x101.6x101.6 cm, Los Angeles County Museum of Art (LACMA)

In 2017 Colón created the Parabolic Monolith, a monumental sculptural form towering 15 feet high, described by art critic Christopher Knight, "like the flattened nose-cones of an airplane or science-fiction starship….Undeniably eye-catching, these giant luxury objects press technological craftsmanship to an extreme degree."

=== Slabs ===
In 2017 Colón developed a series of standing sculptures referred to as "Light Slabs," 8-feet tall works with a light-activated core rendered in translucent acrylic and polished stainless steel.

=== Light Portals ===
In 2020, Colón exhibited a series of linear wall sculptures titled Light Portals, presenting swaths of structural color that shift and refract depending on the variability of external light conditions and the position of the viewer.

=== Unidentified Objects ===
In 2020, Colón created Unidentified Objects, a body of work referencing cosmological origins and universal forces such as matter, energy, gravity, space and time.

== Museum exhibitions ==
Colón’s work has been the subject of solo museum presentations including “Radiant Space” at the Bruce Museum, Greenwich, Connecticut, “Materia Prima” at the Museu Nacional da Republica, Brasilia, Brazil, and “The Feminist Divine” at SCAD Museum of Art, Savannah, Georgia, amongst others.

Colón's work has been presented in several institutional surveys and thematic exhibitions such as: "Brave New Worlds: Explorations of Space," Palm Springs Art Museum, Palm Springs, California, 2019; "California Connections: Selections from the Museum of Contemporary Art San Diego," The California Center for the Arts Museum, Escondido, California, 2017; "Plastic Entanglements: Ecology, Aesthetics, Materials," Smith College Museum of Art, Northampton, Massachusetts, 2019, "California Dreaming: Contemporary Art From the Weisman Foundation," Fredrick R. Weisman Museum of Art, Pepperdine University, Malibu, California, 2017; "Crystals in Art: Ancient to Today," Crystal Bridges Museum of American Art, Bentonville, Arkansas, 2019; and will be included in "Light, Space, Surface: Southern California Art From LACMA'S Collection," Frist Art Museum, traveling to Addison Gallery of American Art, Andover, Massachusetts, and The Ringling Museum of Art, Sarasota, Florida, 2021–2022.

In her retrospective exhibition ''La Montaña, El Monolito'' in 2026 at the Museum of Contemporary Art of Puerto Rico (MAC), she explored themes of cosmology, Puerto Rican identity, Indigenous history, and humanity’s relationship to nature and the universe. The exhibition brought together nearly three decades of her work, from early paintings such as ''Pinnacle (El Yunque)'' (1996) to later sculptural and multimedia installations.

=== Site-specific projects ===
Colón’s practice has engaged global projects in countries such as France, The Netherlands, Egypt, Saudi Arabia, Brazil, Puerto Rico, Cuba, and Turkey, activating three UNESCO World Heritage Sites. Notable monumental land installations and public exhibitions include: The Future is Now for the Land Art Biennial, Desert X AlUla (Saudi Arabia, 2020); Forever is Now (Egypt, 2021) presenting a site-specific monument at the Pyramids of Giza, a UNESCO landmark dating back 4,500 years; Godheads - Idols in Times of Crisis in the Oude Warande Forest (Netherlands 2022); One Thousand Galaxies of Light (Starfield), an immersive light installation at the Wadi Hanifa River, Riyadh, Saudi Arabia (November 2022); If The Walls Could Talk / Reclaimed Stones: Foundations of Civilization, Past, Present, Future at the UNESCO World Heritage Site, The Citadel of Salah al-Din, Cairo, Egypt (October 2023); Máteria Prima, a survey solo exhibition and large-scale environmental activation Plasmático: El Cuarto Estado de Máteria at the Museu Nacional da República, in Brasília, Brazil (2024), which traveled to the Instituto Artium da Cultura, São Paulo, Brazil (2024); the XV Havana Biennial, Horizontes Compartidos, at the Museo Nacional de Bellas Artes, Cuba (2024); and Ríos de Oro y Polvo, at the El Yunque National Rainforest, Puerto Rico (2025).

=== Collections ===
Colón's works are held in the permanent collections of institutions such as the Los Angeles County Museum of Art; Perez Art Museum Miami; Museum of Contemporary Art San Diego; Butler Institute of American Art; Palm Springs Art Museum; and Frederick R. Weisman Art Foundation, among others.
