= Mary Corse =

American artist

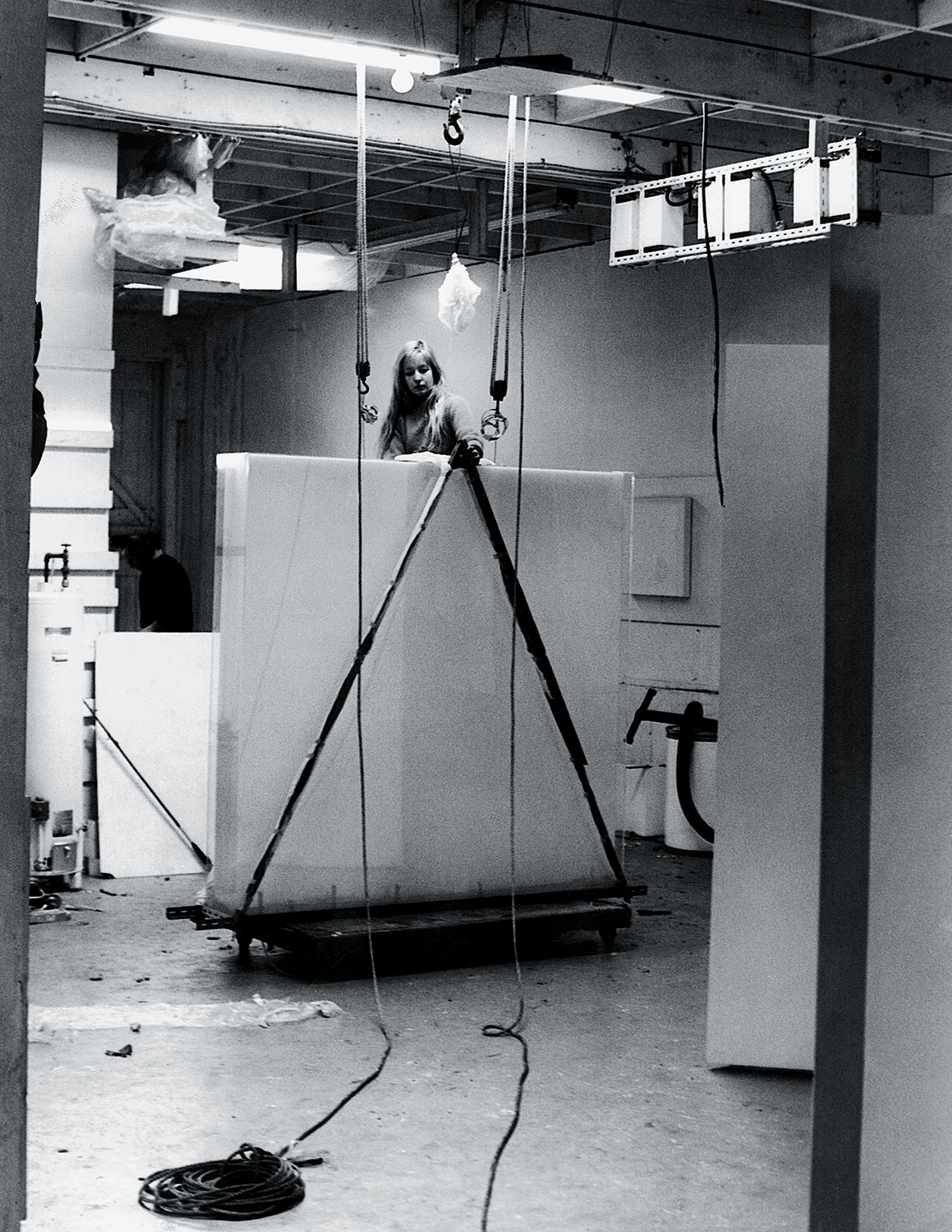
- Mary Corse in her Downtown Los Angeles Studio with her light box work 'Untitled' (1967)
- Born: 1945 (age 80–81); Berkeley, California
- Education: Chouinard Art Institute B.F.A
- Known for: Painting
- Notable work: White Light Painting
- Movement: Light and Space

Mary Corse (born 1945) is an American artist who lives and works in Topanga, California. Fascinated with perceptual phenomena and the idea that light itself can serve as both subject and material in art, Corse's practice can be seen as existing at a crossroads between American Abstract Expressionism and American Minimalism. She is often associated with the male-dominated Light and Space art movement of the 1960s, although her role has only been fully recognized in recent years. She is best known for her experimentation with radiant surfaces in minimalist painting, incorporating materials that reflect light such as glass microspheres. Corse initially attended University of California, Santa Barbara starting in 1963. She later moved on to study at Chouinard Art Institute (now CalArts), earning her B.F.A. in 1968.

== Work ==
In the mid-1960s, during her time at Chouinard Art Institute, Mary Corse developed an interest in white monochrome paintings, favoring the controlled, geometric style of Minimalism. At the same time, she began to make shaped canvases paintings as well as three-dimensional works, for which she assembled columns out of plywood and joint compound that were then painted with white acrylic paint and sanded to remove any trace of her brushwork.

In 1966, Corse started a series of works that encased fluorescent bulbs in Plexiglas boxes. In 1968, Corse became interested in attempting to move these light boxes away from the wall without cords, necessitating the use of a Tesla coil, which supports wireless electricity. Corse completed courses in quantum physics at the University of Southern California in order to earn certification to handle large Tesla coils for these works.

Also in 1968, she began to embed glass microspheres (tiny reflective beads commonly used to brighten highway lines) in her paintings by layering them over white acrylic paint. The paintings in the White Light Series are "highly responsive to their environments and reveal internal complexities when lighting conditions fluctuate or viewers change their positions." Because of their capacity for transformation, the White Light paintings reflect Corse's interest in the personal and subjective nature of perception. Unlike in her earlier sculptures and shaped canvas works, the paintings in the White Light Series embrace the brushstroke, revealing Corse's hand in the works. White Light paintings from this early period often were often composed as grids, or as single microsphere-painted fields with contrasting flat white corners.

Corse moved from Downtown Los Angeles to Topanga Canyon in 1970 after the birth of her first child. This transition prompted new explorations into materials and processes, most notably in her experimentation with ceramic, as well as small black acrylic squares which she applied in acrylic on canvas. For the Black Earth Series, begun in 1978, Corse molded slabs of clay off a sizable flat rock near her Topanga studio, creating large tiles which were then fired and painted with opaque black glaze. The series was conceptualized as a foil to her microsphere paintings, acting as a grounding strategy for Corse after a decade of White Light works. In order to make the Black Earth works, Corse personally built her own extra-large updraft kiln on her Topanga property.

Corse returned again to the White Light Series - over her decades-long career Corse experimented with different compositional formats, scales, forms, and colors within the series. Perhaps the most celebrated and elusive offshoot of the paintings is the White Light Inner Band series, an effect achieved through a new technique of painting with glass microspheres. Begun in 1996, the series is characterized by a defined interior band that emerges from within the white field of microspheres and disappears as the viewer walks along the length of the work. As Whitney Museum curator Kim Conaty explains in the catalogue for Mary Corse: A Survey in Light, the Inner Bands "...insist upon the active viewing experience [Corse] seeks. They demonstrate that a monochrome, destabilized by the viewer's perception of its shifting surface, can take on many distinct states."

== Exhibitions ==
Corse's work has been featured in several historically significant exhibitions including Venice in Venice, a collateral exhibition created by Nyehaus in association with the J. Paul Getty Museum at the 54th Venice Biennale (2011) as well as Pacific Standard Time: Crosscurrents in L.A. Painting and Sculpture, 1950-1970 (J. Paul Getty Museum, Los Angeles and Martin-Gropius-Bau, Berlin, Germany, 2011) and Phenomenal: California Light and Space (Museum of Contemporary Art San Diego, 2011) both of which were included as a part of Pacific Standard Time: Art in L.A., 1945–1980. In June 2018, the Whitney Museum of American Art exhibited Mary Corse: A Survey in Light, which will travel to the Los Angeles County Museum of Art in July 2019. Her work was included in the 2024 exhibition Making Their Mark: Works from the Shah Garg Collection at the Berkeley Art Museum and Pacific Film Archive (BAMPFA).

== Collections ==
Art works by Corse are held in the permanent collections of institutions such as the National Gallery of Art; the Dia Art Foundation; The Seattle Art Museum; Frederick R. Weisman Art Foundation, Los Angeles; Solomon R. Guggenheim Museum, New York; and the Blanton Museum of Art at the University of Texas at Austin;

== Recognition ==
Corse was awarded the Cartier Foundation award (1993), the Theodoran Award by the Solomon R. Guggenheim Museum (1971), and the New Talent Award by the Los Angeles County Museum of Art (1967). In 1975, she received a National Endowment for the Arts Fellowship.

Her image is included in the iconic 1972 poster Some Living American Women Artists by Mary Beth Edelson.

== Bibliography ==
- Fidel, Danieli. "Mary Corse." Artforum (Summer 1968).
- Kramer, Hilton. "Los Angeles, Now the 'In' Art Scene." New York Times. June 1, 1972.
- Baker, E.C. "Los Angeles 1971." ARTnews (September 1971).
- Plagens, Peter. "Decline and Rise of Younger LA Artists." Artforum (May 1972).
