= Light and Space =

Art movement

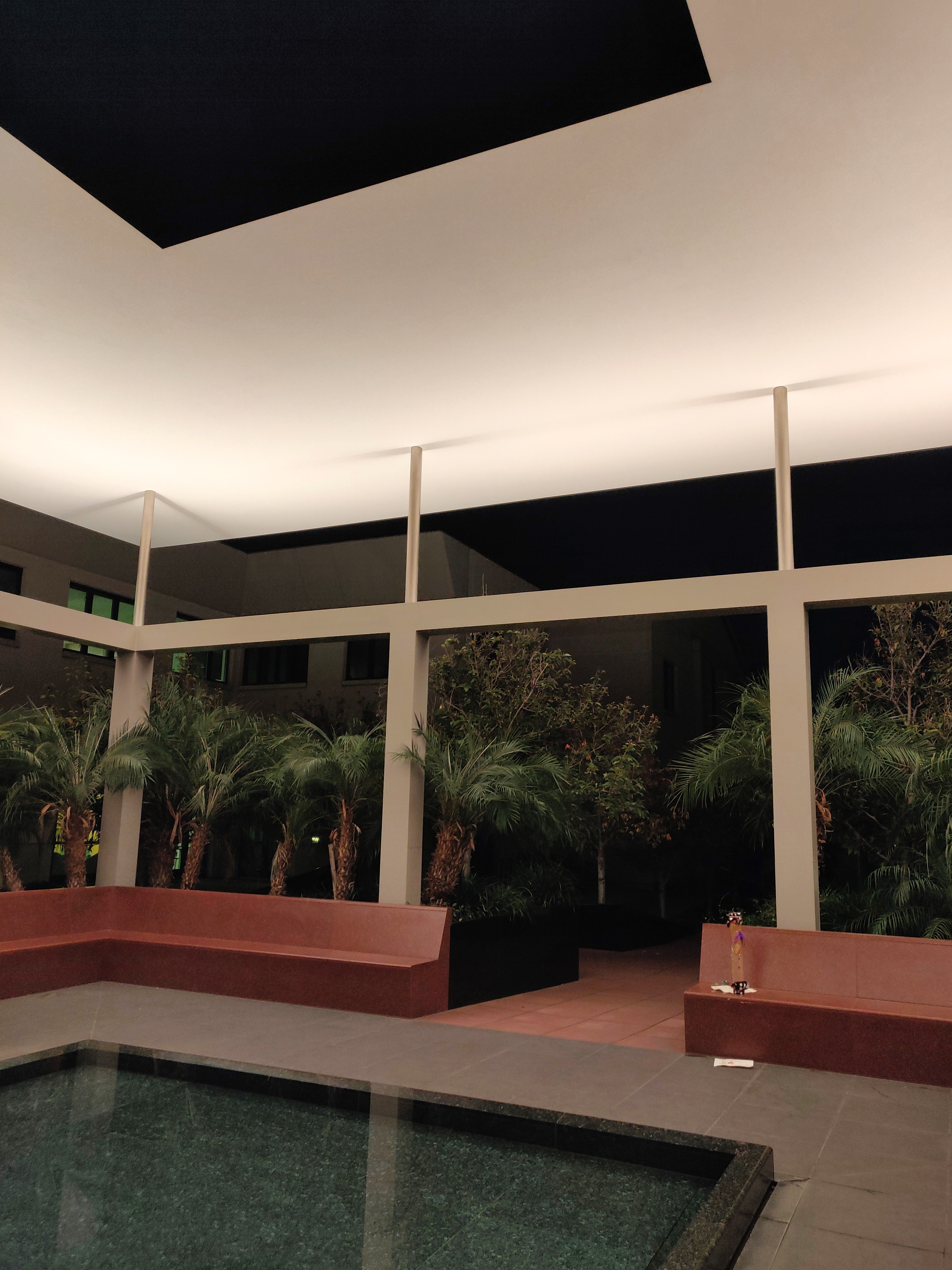
Dividing the Light (2007), a skyspace by James Turrell at Pomona College

Light and Space denotes a loosely affiliated art movement related to op art, minimalism and geometric abstraction originating in Southern California in the 1960s and influenced by John McLaughlin. It is characterized by a focus on perceptual phenomena, such as light, volume and scale, and the use of materials such as glass, neon, fluorescent lights, resin and cast acrylic, often forming installations conditioned by the work's surroundings. Whether by directing the flow of natural light, embedding artificial light within objects or architecture, or by playing with light through the use of transparent, translucent or reflective materials, Light and Space artists make the spectator's experience of light and other sensory phenomena under specific conditions the focus of their work. From the movement's inception, artists were incorporating into their work the latest technologies of the Southern California-based engineering and aerospace industries to develop sensuous, light-filled objects. James Turrell, who has spread the movement worldwide, summed up its philosophy in saying, "We eat light, drink it in through our skins."

== Light and Space Artists ==
The 1971 exhibition "Transparency, Reflection, Light, Space: Four Artists," curated by Frederick S. Wight, the founding director UCLA Art Galleries of the UCLA School of the Arts and Architecture, is widely recognized for introducing the term "Light and Space." By assembling the sensory-oriented works of Peter Alexander, Larry Bell, Robert Irwin, Laddie John Dill, and Craig Kauffman, the exhibition shifted emphasis from traditional subject matter to the perceptual experiences of viewers. Industrial materials such as glass, resin, and plastics were employed to transform the gallery environment. The exhibition catalog became an artifact of its time, notably including an interview in which Larry Bell removed all vowels from his responses as an act of artistic defiance. Additional artists associated with the movement are Robert Irwin, Lita Albuquerque, Ron Cooper, Mary Corse, Fred Eversley, John McCracken, Bruce Nauman, Maria Nordman, Eric Orr, Helen Pashgian, Joe Ray, James Turrell, DeWain Valentine, Doug Wheeler, Norman Zammitt, Chris Burden, and Elyn Zimmerman. Late artists Mel and Dorothy Tanner began their light and space art in the 1960s, unaware of the movement in California. A famous group of abstract color theory artists were influenced by the Light and Space Movement, notably: Frederick Spratt, Phil Sims, Anne Appleby, and David Simpson.

== Legacy ==
The legacy of the Light and Space movement can be seen in the work of important contemporary artists, such as Casper Brindle, Olafur Eliasson, Brigitte Kowanz, Ann Veronica Janssens, Jennifer Steinkamp, Amadour, Kaloust Guedel, Leo Villareal, Doug Aitken, Phillip K. Smith III, Gisela Colon, and Shana Mabari.

== Themes ==
Irwin and Turrell, for instance, investigated the phenomenon of sensory deprivation (which influenced the development of their similarly spare light works) as part of the art-and-technology program initiated by the Los Angeles County Museum of Art in 1967. Wheeler’s RM 669 (1969) comprises curved white walls encased by a floor and ceiling that seem to recede with every step one takes toward the square of light positioned on the far wall, rendering viewers unable to fix their eyes on any surface. For his series of works on the theme of alchemy, Eric Orr has used natural light as well as blood and fire in his environments that produce extreme retinal responses. Mary Corse's large white-on-white glass canvases have glass micro-beads embedded in the acrylic paint to create a surface that shifts dramatically with the light. Helen Pashgian created acrylic spheres, globes with an unreal glow, seemingly lighted from within. More recently, Gisela Colon, who has been recognized in Artforum as a next generation light and space artist, has created "irregularly shaped wall mounted acrylic orbs... scarab-like objects achieve their iridescence via the play of natural light, yet the sculptures appear to change color as one moves around them, as if lit by multihued bulbs."

The movement is also referred to as "California Minimalism," as art critic Sascha Crasnow notes, due to its incorporation of Minimalism's reductive qualities while introducing a distinct Californian emphasis on the interaction of light and space. Additionally, it is closely associated with "Finish/Fetish," a term introduced by John Coplans in the late 1960s, which denotes the use of plastics with glossy finishes and highly polished surfaces, as exemplified by artists such as Billy Al Bengston, Craig Kauffman, Ken Price, and John McCracken.

John McCracken states the following. "I was always primarily interested in form alone, but then to make a form, you have to make it out of something. So color seemed a natural material to use, because color is abstract. If you make a form that appears to be composed of color, then you have something, an object, that's pretty abstract. Just form alone would be more abstract, of course, because it's just a mental idea, but you don't have anything there for your perceptions to grapple with unless you make it out of a material. However, if you make it out of metal, or stone, or wood, or whatever, then you have something that to my mind may overemphasize the physical aspect and therefore be difficult to perceive as purely mental. An important thought behind this is that all things are essentially mental - that matter, while quite real on the one hand, is on the other hand composed of energy, and in turn, of pure thought."

== Exhibitions ==
Light and Space art from California was shown at Germano Celant's influential exhibition of environment-based art at the 1976 Venice Biennale, "Ambiente/arte dal futurismo alla body art". The movement has rarely been shown together, as Wheeler rejected to be included in major museum exhibitions, because of his doubts that the works would be shown in the way they were intended, and Nordman refuses to be in group shows on Light and Space. In 2010, David Zwirner Gallery, New York presented an historic exhibition titled “Primary Atmospheres,” a term coined by art critic Dave Hickey to describe the contributions of Southern California artists to the Light & Space movement. As part of a series of exhibitions during the 2011 Pacific Standard Time initiative, the Museum of Contemporary Art San Diego held a major survey exhibition of perceptual art titled "Phenomenal: California Light, Space, Surface," organized by the museum's then curator Robin Clark.
