= Jean-David Malat =

French art curator

- Born: 1975 (age 50–51); Paris, France
- Occupations: Art dealer, gallerist

Jean-David Malat (born 1975) is a French art dealer and gallerist. He currently lives in London, United Kingdom.

== Early life ==
Malat grew up in a Paris suburb with his parents and sisters; his father was a furrier, and his mother worked as a bookseller. In his childhood, he discovered his love for art, when he visited museums such as the Musée d’Orsay and the Louvre with his family.

== Early career ==
Before starting a career in art, Jean-David Malat worked as an actor and model. Later, during an event in which he met French designer Jean-Claude Jitrois, he began working in the fashion industry in Jitrois’ boutique on Rue Saint Honoré.

In 2000, Malat moved to London where he began working as a sales assistant for a fashion boutique on Sloane Street. It was during this time that Malat's interest in art was reignited following a visit to the Francis Bacon exhibition at the Tate Britain. It was this visit that sparked his move into the fine art world, starting as a sales assistant in a commercial gallery in 2005.

During his early art career, Malat focused on sales in the secondary market, selling notable works of art by Picasso, Renoir, Bacon, and Chagall. Malat continued to work in commercial galleries until 2017 before founding his own private gallery.

== Career ==
JD Malat Gallery opened a gallery in June 2018. The gallery focuses on nurturing emerging artists as well as presenting established artists with a dynamic roster of programs and exhibitions. Specializing in contemporary art, the gallery represents over 20 international artists working within a range of media, from sculpture and painting to video and photography. The gallery has a permanent location in Mayfair, London and has previously showcased its program at pop-up spaces in New York, United States and St. Moritz, Switzerland.

=== Henrik Uldalen: Metanoia ===
Jean-David Malat opened the Mayfair gallery with the exhibition ‘Metanoia’ by Henrik Uldalen, a Korean-Norwegian artist that the French gallerist discovered through Instagram. The exhibition opened to the public on 11 June, featuring seventeen new oil paintings by the London-based artist. Henrik Uldalen, born in South Korea in 1986 and raised in Norway, is a self-taught artist best known for his oil paintings that combine classical figurative style with expressionist influences and a contemporary vision.

Though many of his paintings are imbued with a sense of melancholy, ‘Metanoia’ represents a transformation in both the artist and his work. The artist works in oils to create depictions of human figures obscured by thick layers of impasto.

=== Isolation Mastered ===
In 2020, JD Malat launched a new group exhibition titled 'Isolation Mastered,' an open-call juried exhibition. They received over 1,000 submissions and featured 25 artists in the exhibition, selecting artists who demonstrated innovative dialogue during the lockdown period. 8,000 public votes selected 5 top artists, with Marina Gonzalez winning a solo exhibition at the Gallery in 2021 and Andrew Litten and Kojo Marfo being added to the JD Malat Gallery artist roster.

=== Ferus: A Visual Conversation ===
In September 2022, JD Malat opened the group show ‘Ferus: A Visual Conversation’ which showcased artworks by Billy Al Bengston (b.1934), John Altoon (1925 - 1969), Ed Moses (1926 - 2018), Craig Kauffman (1932 - 2010) and Giorgio Morandi (1890 - 1964). Co-curated by Dr. Richard Davey and Annie Pereira, the exhibition was dedicated to the artistic relationships that flourished within the Ferus Gallery, and Jean-David Malat wished to examine the centrality of visual exchange amongst these established figures during the 1950s and 1960s.

== Personal life ==
Jean-David Malat has two sons, and was divorced in 2023.
