= Ed Moses (artist) =

Los Angeles-based artist, member of the 'Cool School' (1925-2018)

- Born: April 9, 1926; Long Beach, California, U.S.
- Died: January 17, 2018 (aged 91); Venice, California, U.S.
- Education: University of California, Los Angeles
- Known for: Painting
- Movement: Abstract art
- Spouse: Avilda Peters (m. 1959)
- Awards: National Endowment for the Arts (1976); Guggenheim Fellowship (1980)

Ed Moses (April 9, 1926 – January 17, 2018) was an American artist based in Los Angeles and a central figure of postwar West Coast art.

Moses first exhibited at the Ferus Gallery in 1957 and became widely known over the next five decades.

== Early life and education ==
Moses was born in Long Beach, California to Olivia Branco and Alphonse Lemuel Moses on April 9, 1926.

Moses enlisted in the U.S. Navy at age 17, serving in the Navy Medical Corps as a scrub assistant during World War II. Moses subsequently enrolled in a pre-med program at Long Beach City College. When he was not accepted into medical school, he enrolled in art classes with Pedro Miller, a graduate from the Art Institute of Chicago. In 1949, he left Long Beach City College, transferring to UCLA and subsequently the University of Oregon. He left school, worked odd jobs before re-enrolling at UCLA in 1953, where he became friends with Craig Kauffman and Walter Hopps. To complete his master's degree, Moses held his graduate show at the Ferus Gallery, rather than on his college campus.

In 1958, Moses moved to New York City, where he met Willem de Kooning, Franz Kline, Mark Rothko and Milton Resnick. In 1960 he returned to California.

In 1959, Moses married Avilda Peters; and moved to the state of Virginia, followed by San Francisco and again to Los Angeles.

== Art career and later life ==
=== Early years ===
In the 1950s and 1960s, Moses was part a group of artists named the Cool School, composed of Craig Kauffman, Ed Ruscha, Robert Irwin, Larry Bell, Edward Kienholz, John Altoon, Ken Price and Billy Al Bengston.

Early on, Moses gained attention for his "Rose Drawings" based on a pattern he traced off an oilcloth tablecloth found in Mexico. He repeated the patterns until they became dense abstractions. One of these pieces is part of Los Angeles Museum of Contemporary Art's permanent collection.

=== Middle years ===
Moses joined the art faculty in 1968 at the new University of California campus at Irvine, where he would stay until 1972. In 1980, he received a Guggenheim Fellowship. Moses began working with Peter Goulds at L.A. Louver. He remained with Goulds for the next 15 years.

=== Later years ===
In 1991, he took part in the Whitney Biennial.

In 1996, Moses' paintings were documented in a major retrospective exhibition at MOCA (Museum of Contemporary Art), Los Angeles.

In 2016, the year he turned 90, Moses exhibited a new series of paintings based on a craquelure technique where he painted the canvas with either black or white, then adding a subsequent medium over the paint (which he kept "secret") and then smashing the canvas with his fist or elbow.

Moses died at his home in Venice, California, at the age of 91.

== Personal life ==
Ed is survived by his son, Andy Moses, who is also an accomplished artist.

== Public collections ==
- Albright-Knox Gallery, Buffalo, NY
- Art Institute of Chicago, Chicago, IL
- Berkeley Art Museum, University of California, Berkeley, CA
- Cincinnati Museum of Art, Cincinnati, OH
- Corcoran Gallery of Art, Washington, DC
- Dallas Museum of Art
- Dartmouth College Gallery, Hanover, NH
- Denver Art Museum, Denver, CO
- CU Art Museum, University of Colorado Boulder, CO
- Hammer Museum, Los Angeles, CA
- Hirshhorn Museum and Sculpture Garden, Washington, DC
- Irvine Collection, Irvine, CA
- Janss Foundation, Thousand Oaks, CA
- Lannan Foundation, Santa Fe, NM
- Long Beach Museum of Art, Long Beach, CA
- Los Angeles County Museum of Art, Los Angeles, CA
- Lowe Art Museum, University of Miami, Miami, FL
- Menil Foundation, Rice University Art Gallery Houston, TX
- Minneapolis Institute of Art
- Musee national d'art moderne – Centre Georges Pompidou, Paris, France
- Museum of Contemporary Art, Los Angeles, CA
- Museum of Contemporary Art San Diego, La Jolla, CA
- Museum of Fine Arts Houston
- Museum of Modern Art, New York, NY
- National Gallery of Art
- Smithsonian American Art Museum, Washington, DC
- Neuberger Museum of Art, Purchase, NY
- New Mexico Museum of Art, Santa Fe, NM
- Norton Simon Museum, Pasadena, CA
- Oakland Museum of California, Oakland, CA
- Orange County Museum of Art, Newport Beach, CA
- Palm Springs Desert Museum, Palm Springs, CA
- Philadelphia Museum of Art, Philadelphia, PA
- Prudential Insurance Company, Newark, NJ
- San Francisco Museum of Modern Art, San Francisco, CA
- Seattle Museum of Art, Seattle, WA
- Spencer Museum of Art, University of Kansas, Lawrence, KS
- The Broad Art Foundation, Santa Monica, CA
- Walker Art Center, Minneapolis, MN
- Frederick R. Weisman Art Foundation, Los Angeles, CA
- Whitney Museum of American Art, New York, NY
- Yale University Art Gallery, New Haven, CT

== Awards ==
- 1996 – Honorary Ph.D., Otis Art Institute, Los Angeles, CA
- 1993 – Long Beach City College Hall of Fame Inductee
- 1980 – Guggenheim Fellowship
- 1976 – National Endowment for the Arts Fellowship Grant
