= Alan Lynch (artist) =

American artist

Alan Lynch in 1962

Alan Lynch (August 27, 1926 – April 15, 1994) was an American painter associated with post-war California art.

Throughout the 1950s, he was active amongst artists living in Los Angeles, where he worked alongside artists Robert Irwin, Craig Kauffman, Billy Al Bengston, and others associated with Ferus Gallery. Throughout the 1960s, he would exhibit with Dilexi Gallery in San Francisco before withdrawing from commercial exhibitions in favor of maintaining a private artistic practice throughout the 1970s until his death in 1994

Though his work remained in obscurity after 1969, figures like Irwin and Kauffman regarded him as an early influence and catalyst for their engagement with spiritual philosophies

== Early life and education ==
Lynch was born in 1926 in San Francisco, California. His father worked as an executive at the Alcoa Corporation. While still a child, the Lynch Family moved to Santa Monica, and later to Los Angeles, California. When he was twelve years old, his brother died from a heart condition; this event led Lynch to focus on several studies privately, including natural history, martial arts, and Japanese culture. These subjects influenced his visual art as well as his spiritual interests.

He received an MFA degree in 1950 from Mexico City College. He received a second MFA degree from UCLA in 1954 in Fine Arts and Art History.

== Work ==
Lynch's exhibitions at Dilexi Gallery were characterized by "canvases devoted to fairly large, organically-inspired, abstract shapes", situated in "surrounding space being painted in light, almost pastel-like, radiant colors". Writing for Artforum in 1964, Knut Stiles remarked on Lynch's approach to the medium, "The colors are minor-key terra cottas, not only the ochres, umbers, and siennas ordinarily associated with that term, but plums, violets, dusty rose, lichen green, with a few brilliant hues which perform a dramatic role in that context, jumping like seeds from a pod."

Throughout the 1960s, his oil paintings were also exhibited at San Francisco Museum of Modern Art, Cantonal Museum of Fine Arts, Witte Museum, Crocker Art Museum, and the Whitney Museum of American Art.

From 1969 until his death, Lynch continued realizing artworks in watercolor and ink. Concurrently, he studied Sōtō Zen Buddhism under Taisen Deshimaru. His artwork made in this period was meditative, and connected closely to his philosophical interests. Isabella Miller writes:

[Lynch's] works are themselves meditative in their small scale and similar compositions, as though the ritualistic pace of Zen study was incarnated through his artistic work. Like the work of the [Transcendental Painting Group] artists, Lynch’s framed paintings are socially disengaged and often contain curving forms that sometimes appear biomorphic, sometimes geologic.

In 1964, Lynch received a Fulbright Travel Scholarship, as well as a grant from the American Office of Cultural Exchange. Two works by Lynch are held in the permanent collection of the Monterey Museum of Art.
