= Finish Fetish =

Finish Fetish denotes a style of art related to the LA Look, pop art, minimalism, and light and space originating in southern California in the 1960s. Artwork of this type often has a glossy and slick finish and features an abstract design on a two-or three-dimensional surface made from fiberglass or resins. The style is similar to the simplicity and abstraction of minimalism and the bright colors and reference to commercial products found in pop art. To the world of postwar art it was a substantive addition.

== Artists ==
Artists associated with the Finish Fetish style include Peter Alexander, Larry Bell, Billy Al Bengston, Judy Chicago, Joe Goode, Robert Irwin, Craig Kauffman, John McCracken, Kenneth Price, DeWain Valentine, and Don Dudley. Contemporary artists influenced by this movement include Nellie King Solomon (daughter of Barbara Stauffacher Solomon).

== Themes ==
Works are often reminiscent of automobiles and surfboards. Artists have "used new resins, paints and plastics, and adopted highly innovative fabrication processes from the industrial world to create seamless, bright, and pristine-looking objects directly inspired by California culture. In doing so, they often blurred the boundaries between painting and sculpture, 2D and 3D, handcrafted and industrially-produced objects."

== Exhibitions ==
SOCAL: Southern California Art of the 1960s and '70s From LACMA's Collcection, Los Angeles County Museum of Art, October 2007 - March 2008
