= The Cool School (2008 film) =

2008 film by Morgan Neville

- Directed by: Morgan Neville
- Written by: Kristine McKenna; Morgan Neville
- Produced by: Morgan Neville; Kristine McKenna
- Narrated by: Jeff Bridges
- Edited by: Chris Perkel; Dylan Robertson
- Music by: Dan Crane; William Ungerman
- Distributed by: Arthouse Films
- Release date: 7 March 2008 (Cleveland International Film Festival)
- Running time: 86 minutes
- Country: United States
- Language: English

The Cool School is a 2008 American documentary film about the rise of the Los Angeles contemporary art scene. It was directed by Morgan Neville and narrated by Jeff Bridges. The documentary premièred at the Cleveland International Film Festival.

It focused on the Ferus Gallery, and its founders, Walter Hopps and Ed Kienholz. It profiled numerous artists, including Ed Ruscha, Craig Kauffman, Wallace Berman, Ed Moses, John Altoon, and Robert Irwin.

The review aggregator website Rotten Tomatoes surveyed 26 critics and, categorizing the reviews as positive or negative, assessed 24 as positive and 2 as negative for a 92 percent rating. Among the reviews, it determined an average rating of 7.00 out of 10. The critics consensus reads "A breezy and lively modern art documentary, revealing that LA is not a cultural wasteland when it comes to fine art."
