= Cool School =

Cool School or The Cool School could refer to:

- Cool School (2007 film), Turkish comedy film
- The Cool School (2008 film), American documentary film about the Los Angeles art scene
- The Cool School (album), 1960 album by June Christy
