= Alan Lynch =

Alan Lynch may refer to:

- Alan Lynch (artist) (1926–1994), American painter
- Alan Lynch (footballer) (1954–2024), Australian rules footballer for Footscray and Richmond, and middle-distance runner

== See also ==
- Allen Lynch (footballer) (1938–2021), Australian rules footballer for Fitzroy
