= Andy Moses =

American abstract painter

- Born: 1962 (age 63–64); Los Angeles, California, U.S.
- Education: California Institute of Arts
- Movement: Light and Space | Finish Fetish
- Spouse: Kelly Berg
- Parent: Ed Moses
- Website: https://www.andymoses.com/

Andy Moses (born 1962) is an American contemporary abstract painter whose work bridges pure abstraction and natural forces. Rather than painting traditional landscapes, his pieces mimic nature's behavior by using fluid mechanics, gravity, and the paint's chemical reactions, often on shaped canvases. He is the son of West Coast abstract artist Ed Moses and Avilda Peters, and lives in Los Angeles.

== Early life and education ==
Andy Moses was born in 1962 in Los Angeles, California. As the son of Ed Moses, he grew up steeped in the California art movements of the time including his father's anti-style, California Cool, Light and Space, and Finish Fetish. Moses attended California Institute of the Arts from 1979 to 1981. While at CalArts, and studied under Barbara Kruger, Michael Asher, and John Baldessari. Upon graduation, Moses decided to move to New York to pursue an art career, however his father was against this idea leading to an estrangement for a number of years.

== Career ==
At 18 years old, he moved to New York and began working with Pat Steir. While in New York he began to experiment with and later develop the painting style for which he is known. In 1986, he participated in his first group exhibition and was given a solo show shortly thereafter, in 1987. Since then, his work was included in several museum shows.

Moses considers the intent of his work to blur the lines between abstraction and landscape. Later, he began to create circular convex canvases that shift and warp the viewers perspective.

Moses has used a fairly consistent color palette inspired by surfing off the coast of California. When speaking about surfing and the ocean as his inspiration, Moses notes "You never saw the same thing twice. The line was always moving. The colors were always shifting."

In 2000, Moses moved back to California, choosing to be near the ocean. He currently works out of his father's old studio.

Moses's works focus on the materiality of the paint itself and how its viscosity and reactions change with movement, gravity, and curvature. His process involves pouring, gravity, and tilting which causes the paint to flow and mix across the substrate allowing for spontaneity. His work is shown within the Light and Space and Finish Fetish movements.

Five years after Moses moved back to California, he and his father began rebuilding their relationship. Prior to his father's death, the two had become next door neighbors, visited each other's studios regularly, and spent hours talking about painting over dinner four times a week culminating in several exhibitions together.

Although both father and son were known as abstract painters, they remained distinct in their approaches. Where Ed purposefully rejected preciousness in his work, Andy delivered fluid abstractions with glossy finishes sharing similar threads to artists in the Light and Space and Finish Fetish movements.

== Personal life ==
Andy Moses is married to acclaimed artist Kelly Berg. Moses and Berg's works are often exhibited together.

== Exhibitions ==
Among others, Moses has exhibited with the following museums: Frederick R. Weisman Foundation; Laguna Art Museum; Museum of Art & History, Lancaster, CA; and Contemporary Arts Center.

Among others, Moses has had solo exhibitions with:JD Malat Gallery, London, UK; William Turner Gallery, Santa Monica, CA; Spanierman Modern, Miami Beach, FL; and JD Malat Gallery, London, UK.
