= Shangri-La (recording studio) =

Recording studio in Malibu, California

- Location: Malibu, California, U.S.
- Owner: Rick Rubin
- Type: recording studio
- Acreage: 1.73 acres (0.70 ha)

Construction
- Built: 1958; 68 years ago
- Renovated: 1976; 50 years ago

Website
- shangrilamalibu.com

Shangri-La is a recording studio in Malibu, California, currently owned by record producer Rick Rubin. Originally a ranch property with a bungalow owned by actress Margo, it was leased by The Band in the 1970s and converted to a recording studio by Rob Fraboni to the precise specifications of Bob Dylan and The Band. Interviews of The Band featured in Martin Scorsese's documentary The Last Waltz were filmed at Shangri-La. The property was purchased by Rick Rubin in 2011. Rubin and Shangri-La were the subject of a four-part documentary series, Shangri-La, which aired on Showtime in 2019.

In 1958, the Mexican-American actress Margo bought a 1.73-acre property in the hills above Zuma Beach. A ranch house was built and the site was named Shangri-La Ranch. Margo starred in the film adaptation of James Hilton's 1933 classic novel Lost Horizon, from where the fabled paradise "Shangri-La" originated.

== History ==
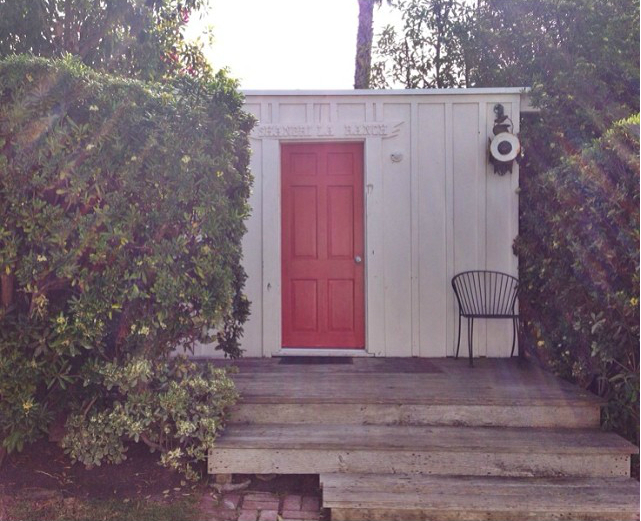
Shangri-La Ranch in May 2016

In 1958, Mexican-American actress Margo bought a 1.73-acre property in the hills above Zuma Beach. A ranch house was built and the site was named Shangri-La Ranch. Margo starred in the film adaptation of James Hilton's 1933 classic novel Lost Horizon, from where the fabled paradise "Shangri-La" originated. The property was an upscale bordello for the 1950s Hollywood elite and a filming site for the TV show Mister Ed in the 1960s.

In 1974, the ranch property was leased by Canadian-American roots rock band The Band. The master bedroom was converted to a recording studio by record producer and audio engineer Rob Fraboni and in-house technician Ed Anderson according to the precise specifications of Bob Dylan and The Band. The Band built it while taking time off after concluding the Bob Dylan and the Band 1974 Tour. Drummer Levon Helm later described Shangri-La as "a clubhouse and studio where we and our friends could record albums and cross-pollinate one another's music." They kept the name "Shangri-La" because to them, "Malibu felt like a paradise after years of gray Catskill winters" in upstate New York. The house came with a Naugahyde bar and bedrooms with mirrored walls, from Shangri-La's time as a bordello.

Shangri-La was a functioning studio by the end of 1974, with Larry Samuels working as studio manager. The Band's Robbie Robertson, Garth Hudson, and Rick Danko were living in houses near Shangri-La and were becoming involved in other outside projects. Levon Helm lived between Woodstock, New York, and Los Angeles, and used a bedroom at Shangri-La when he was in Malibu. Richard Manuel lived at Shangri-La for a year, living in a bungalow down toward Zuma Beach that was converted from the stable of Bamboo Harvester from Mister Ed. Manuel was heavily drinking Grand Marnier liqueur while living at Shangri-La.

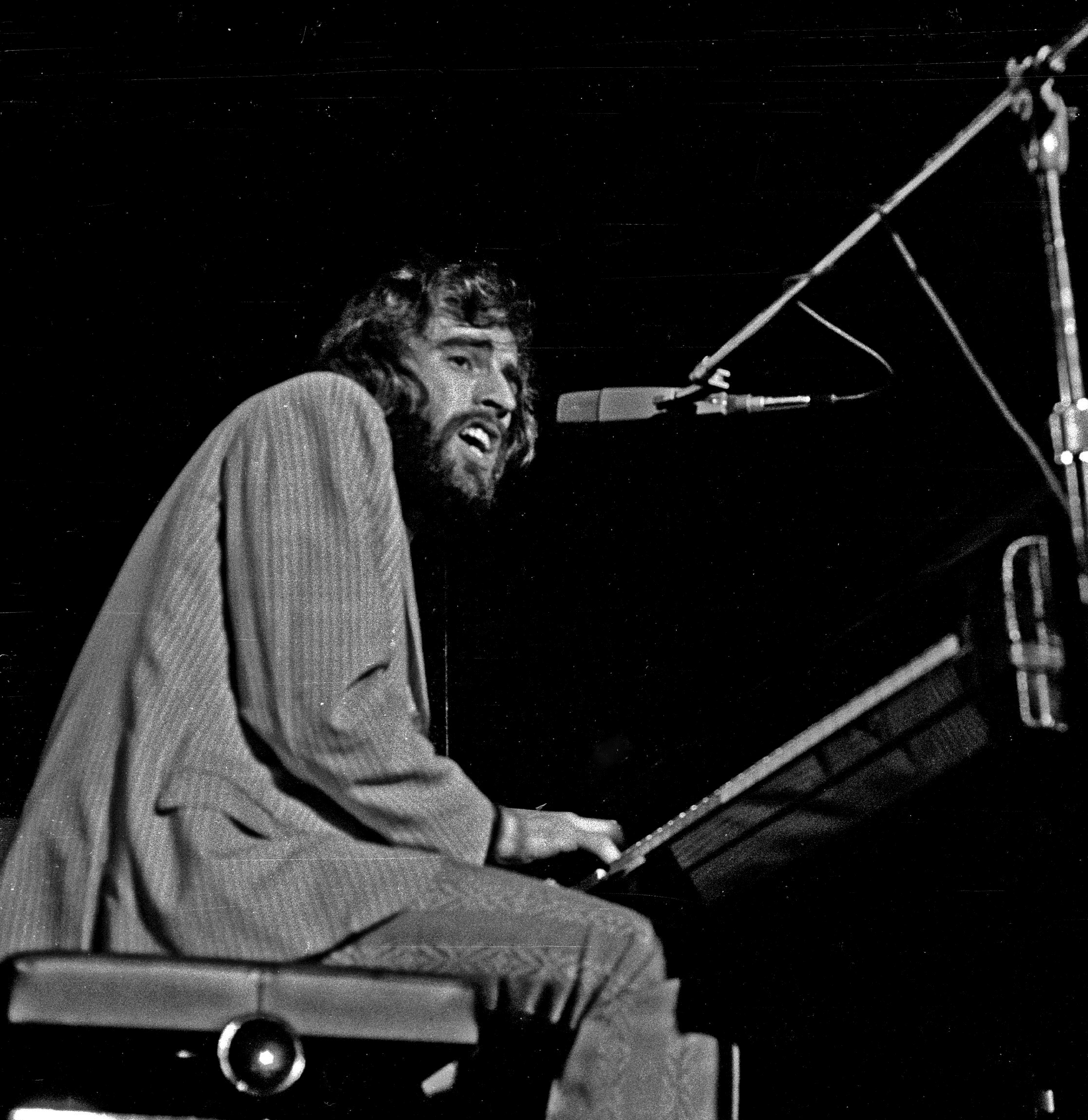
Richard Manuel of The Band lived at Shangri-La for a year, where he resided in a beach bungalow converted from the Mister Ed horse stable.

In 1976, Rob Fraboni teamed up with partners and purchased the house for $195,000, turning it into a semicommercial studio. Shangri-La was a state-of-the-art 24-track studio, equipped with the latest synthesizers.

Interviews of The Band featured in Martin Scorsese's documentary The Last Waltz (1976) were filmed at Shangri-La.

The 24-track console allowed The Band keyboardist Garth Hudson to record multiple layers of keyboards on several tracks on their sixth studio album, Northern Lights – Southern Cross. Several albums were recorded under Fraboni's management, including Renée Geyer's So Lucky (1981), Bonnie Raitt's Green Light (1982), and Eric Clapton's No Reason to Cry (1976).

Clapton spent nearly three months at Shangri-La, hanging out and recording with The Band, Bob Dylan, Van Morrison, Ringo Starr, Pete Townshend, Joe Cocker, Billy Preston, Ronnie Wood, and Georgie Fame. Bob Dylan lived outside in a tent in the garden during Clapton's time at Shangri-La. Clapton formed a close friendship with Richard Manuel while at Shangri-La. Garth Hudson recorded overdubs at Shangri-La for Van Morrison's 10th studio album, Wavelength (1978).

In 1985, Rob Fraboni left Shangri-La to serve as vice president of Island Records. The studio's usage decreased dramatically after Fraboni's exit.

In the late 1990s, Blaine "Beej" Chaney of the Minneapolis new wave punk band The Suburbs purchased the property for $2,125,000. Over the next few years, he invested an additional $2 million into the studio, and with the help of producers Jim Niper and Pete Strobl, loaded it with the premium vintage audio equipment that is still in use today, including the centerpiece API 32 BUS console. Immediately following these renovations, Chaney invited Mark Knopfler to record there, where he went on to make his acclaimed album, Shangri-La. Also in 2003, they worked with Ethan Johns and Angelo Petraglia to record the debut album by Kings of Leon, Youth and Young Manhood.

In 2006, musician and producer Eric Lynn was invited to become Shangri-La's house engineer and studio manager. Chaney oversaw continued interest in the studio with a number of notable albums being recorded at Shangri-La, including Weezer's self-titled 2008 album, and Metallica's Death Magnetic. Following his divorce from Sarah Macmillan, a Cargill family heiress, Chaney took a more hands-off role in the studio. In 2009, he invited his friend and fellow musician and producer, Jake Coyle, to manage the day-to-day operations at Shangri-La, allowing Eric Lynn to focus entirely on running recording sessions day to day. Coyle facilitated increased interest and stability at Shangri-La during a tumultuous time for recording studios around LA, many of which permanently closed between 2009 and 2011. Shangri-La was now officially experiencing a renaissance with Rick Rubin continuing to rent the property for the majority of his projects including the Gossip's Music For Men, Adele's 21, Kid Rock's Born Free, and The Red Hot Chili Pepper's I'm With You.

In 2011, the studio and property were listed by Chaney for $4.1 million. Within weeks the price tag was cut drastically to $3,195,000. Rick Rubin purchased Shangri-La for $2 million in August 2011. Numerous artists have since recorded at Shangri-La under Rubin's ownership, including Adele, Ed Sheeran, Eminem, and Kanye West.

Shangri-La survived the 2018 Woolsey Fire, but Rubin's two nearby homes were lost to the fire.

== Property and recording spaces ==
Shangri-La consists of four bedrooms, three bathrooms and two primary recording studios. The main studio has an API console and Neumann U 87 microphones. The other recording space, a building called "The Chapel", also uses U 87 microphones and has a console from Muscle Shoals Sound Studio which was formerly in Rubin's The Mansion studio in Laurel Canyon. The property also includes Bob Dylan's former tour bus, which is parked permanently and has been repurposed as a recording space.

== Showtime documentary series ==
The studio and its owner Rick Rubin were the subject of the four-part documentary television series Shangri-La, which aired on Showtime in 2019. A "work-in-progress" cut of the docuseries was screened at the 2019 SXSW Festival. The first two episodes were directed by Morgan Neville, while the last two were directed by Jeff Malmberg.

== List of artists recorded ==
Many artists have recorded at Shangri-La, including:

- Adele
- The Avett Brothers
- The Band
- Jon Batiste
- Beabadoobee
- Black Country Communion
- Black Sabbath
- James Blake
- Boygenius
- Brockhampton
- Jake Bugg
- Daniel Caesar
- Eric Clapton
- Billy Corgan
- Depeche Mode
- Neil Diamond
- Bob Dylan
- Eminem
- Kinky Friedman
- Dave Gahan
- Renée Geyer
- Gossip
- Josh Groban
- Hughes/Thrall
- Imagine Dragons
- Kendrick Lamar
- Kesha
- Kid Rock
- Marcus King
- Kings of Leon
- Mark Knopfler
- Lady Gaga
- Lana Del Rey
- The Last Shadow Puppets
- Lido
- Ian McLagan
- Metallica
- Keb' Mo'
- Monsters of Folk
- Muse
- Milton Nascimento
- Jennifer Nettles
- Pearl Jam
- Porno for Pyros
- Queens of the Stone Age
- Bonnie Raitt
- Red Hot Chili Peppers
- Damien Rice
- Run the Jewels
- Santana
- Travis Scott
- Ed Sheeran
- Skinny Puppy
- The Smashing Pumpkins
- John Stewart
- Angus & Julia Stone
- The Strokes
- Harry Styles
- Kae Tempest
- Tonio K.
- Towkio
- Tyler, the Creator
- U2
- Jennifer Warnes
- Weezer
- Kanye West
- Neil Young
- ZZ Top

== See also ==
- Category:Albums recorded at Shangri-La (recording studio)
