= John Altoon =

American artist (1925–1969)

- Born: November 5, 1925; Los Angeles, California, US
- Died: February 8, 1969 (aged 43); Los Angeles, California, US
- Education: Otis Art Institute, Art Center College of Design, Chouinard Art Institute
- Known for: Painting
- Spouse: Roberta Lunine

John Altoon (November 5, 1925 – February 8, 1969) was an American artist. Born in Los Angeles to immigrant Armenian parents, from 1947 to 1949 he attended the Otis Art Institute, from 1947 to 1950 he also attended the Art Center College of Design in Los Angeles, and in 1950 the Chouinard Art Institute. Altoon was a prominent figure in the LA art scene in the 1950s and 1960s. Exhibitions of his work have been held at the Museum of Contemporary Art San Diego, Whitney Museum of American Art, New York, Corcoran Gallery, Washington D.C, Fine Arts Museums of San Francisco, The Baxter Museum, Pasadena, and The Los Angeles County Museum of Art (opened June 2014).

== Work ==
Altoon's work was influenced by the Abstract Expressionism Movement although he is best known for his figurative drawings of the 1960s, with as Leah Ollman describes "a vocabulary of vaguely figurative, botanical and biological forms that he pursued until his death." He was part of the "Ferus group" of artists so called for their association to the Ferus Gallery that operated in Los Angeles in 1957–1966. Some of the other artists included in this group are Edward Kienholz, Larry Bell, Robert Irwin, Billy Al Bengston. Cool School documentary film about Altoon and other Ferus Gallery artists, many Ferus artists say John was the most fun and friendliest of all, every where everyone liked him. He could charm anyone.

Altoon, during his Ferus Gallery years, did the Ocean Park series which depicted an area around Venice and Santa Monica beach towns in California. The series was 18 paintings as well some works he did on paper. It had the direct from brain to hand & brush approach he was known for: the abstracting of nature on his canvas by pushing through a spontaneous approach, freehand biomorphic in design giving us his interpretation as a direct rendering of the coastal surroundings.

== Mental health ==
Leah Ollman describes his life a 1999 article in Art in America, "With his outsized personality and reckless intensity, John Altoon loomed large in the L.A. art scene of the '50s and '60s."

Altoon was diagnosed with schizophrenia in his late 30s and had bouts of depression and paranoia. In the early 1960s he became a patient of Dr. Milton Wexler a prominent psychoanalyst who restored his ability to work and from then until his death became the most productive and stable years in his life. He was "possessed by real demons," Larry Bell remembers.

Irving Blum, partner in the Ferus Gallery, recalls: "If the gallery was closest in spirit to a single person, that person was John Altoon—dearly loved, defiant, romantic, highly ambitious—and slightly mad." Altoon's struggle with mental illness, his big, dark, robust personality and his early death from a heart attack at 44 have, even more than his art itself, come to define his legacy."

== Personal life ==
John Altoon was married to the actress Fay Spain from 1959 to 1962. He was married to Roberta ("Babs") Lunine from 1966 until his death in 1969.

== See also ==
- The Cool School (2008 film)
