= Shangri-La (miniseries) =

2019 television documentary miniseries

- Television promotional poster
- Genre: Documentary
- Directed by: Morgan Neville; Jeff Malmberg
- Starring: Rick Rubin
- Narrated by: Rick Rubin
- Opening theme: "Shangri-La" by The Lettermen
- Composer: Daniel Wohl
- Country of origin: United States
- Original language: English
- No. of seasons: 1
- No. of episodes: 4

Production
- Executive producers: Morgan Neville; Rick Rubin; Danny Breen; Jeff Malmberg; Michael Goldberg; Isaac Heymann; Eric Lynn; Diana Schmedeman; Jason Schrift; Vinnie Malhotra
- Cinematography: Nicola Marsh
- Editors: Jake Hostetter; Tyler Hubby; Jeff Malmberg; Will Znidaric
- Running time: 48–58 minutes
- Production company: Tremolo Productions

Original release
- Network: Showtime
- Release: July 12 – August 2, 2019

Shangri-La is a four-part television documentary miniseries, directed by Morgan Neville and Jeff Malmberg, that aired on Showtime from July 12 to August 2, 2019. The series concerns the Shangri-La recording studio in Malibu, California and its owner, record producer and Def Jam Records co-founder Rick Rubin. A "work-in-progress" cut of the docuseries was screened at the 2019 SXSW Festival.

The miniseries was nominated for Best Music Film at the 62nd Annual Grammy Awards.

== Cast ==
=== Main ===
- Rick Rubin

=== Reenactments ===
- David Pluebell as Young Rick
- Rowan Smyth as Kid Rick
- Joseph Yokozuna Fatu as Wrestler Rick
- David Nesler as Young Rick Magician (Hands)
- Jill Galbraith as Nancy Heller

=== Other ===
- Joel Bennett as Beachcomber

== Critical reception ==
On the review aggregator website Rotten Tomatoes, 100% of 11 critics' reviews are positive, with an average rating of 7.3/10. The website's consensus reads: "A refreshingly chill music documentary, Shangri-La provides an insightful -- if not exactly revelatory -- peak [sic] into the private world of producer Rick Rubin." According to Metacritic, which assigned a weighted average score of 73 out of 100 based on 9 critics, the series received "generally favorable" reviews.

Time called the series "flawed but sublime".

Tim Goodman of The Hollywood Reporter called the miniseries "inspiring and oddly riveting" and said, "There is more creativity, weirdness, thoughtfulness and ambition — both achieved and failed — in the new Showtime docuseries Shangri-La than in a good portion of recent TV dramas." Goodman also felt, however, that series should have got "a little dirtier and messier in the examination" of Rubin's mid-career years.

On November 20, 2019, the miniseries was nominated for the Grammy Award for Best Music Film at the 62nd Annual Grammy Awards.

== Episodes ==
No.	Title	Directed by	Original release date
1	"Magic"	Morgan Neville	July 12, 2019
Featuring: Tyler, the Creator, Ezra Koenig, Makonnen, Lil Yachty, DRAM, Flea, James Gadson, David Lynch, Daniel Caesar, Rob Fraboni, Robbie Robertson, Kent Nerburn, Mark Ronson, Yebba, The Avett Brothers, David Blaine
2	"Myth"	Morgan Neville	July 19, 2019
Featuring: Wes Lang, Seth Godin, Kae Tempest, Dan Carey, Tyler, the Creator, Mike D, Adam Dubin, Chuck D, Money Mark, Lil Yachty, LL Cool J, Francis and the Lights, Julian Casablancas, Ezra Koenig
3	"Wrestling"	Jeff Malmberg	July 26, 2019
Featuring: Benjamin Clementine, Jim Cornette, Ezra Koenig, Makonnen, Jerrod Carmichael, Ed Stasium, LL Cool J, SZA, Flea, Seth Godin, Triple H, Stephanie McMahon, Mac Miller, Francis and the Lights
4	"Belief"	Jeff Malmberg	August 2, 2019
Featuring: Mary Lattimore, Hatis Noit, Sadhguru, Carlos Santana, Buika, Makonnen, Kent Nerburn, Madison Ryann Ward, Cory Henry, David Lynch, Laird Hamilton, Rivers Cuomo, Ted Denney, Nils Frahm, Money Mark, Rival Consoles, David Blaine, Krishna Das
