= Ferus Gallery =

American art gallery (1957–1966)

Coordinates: 34°05′04.8″N 118°22′34.5″W

723 La Cienega Boulevard
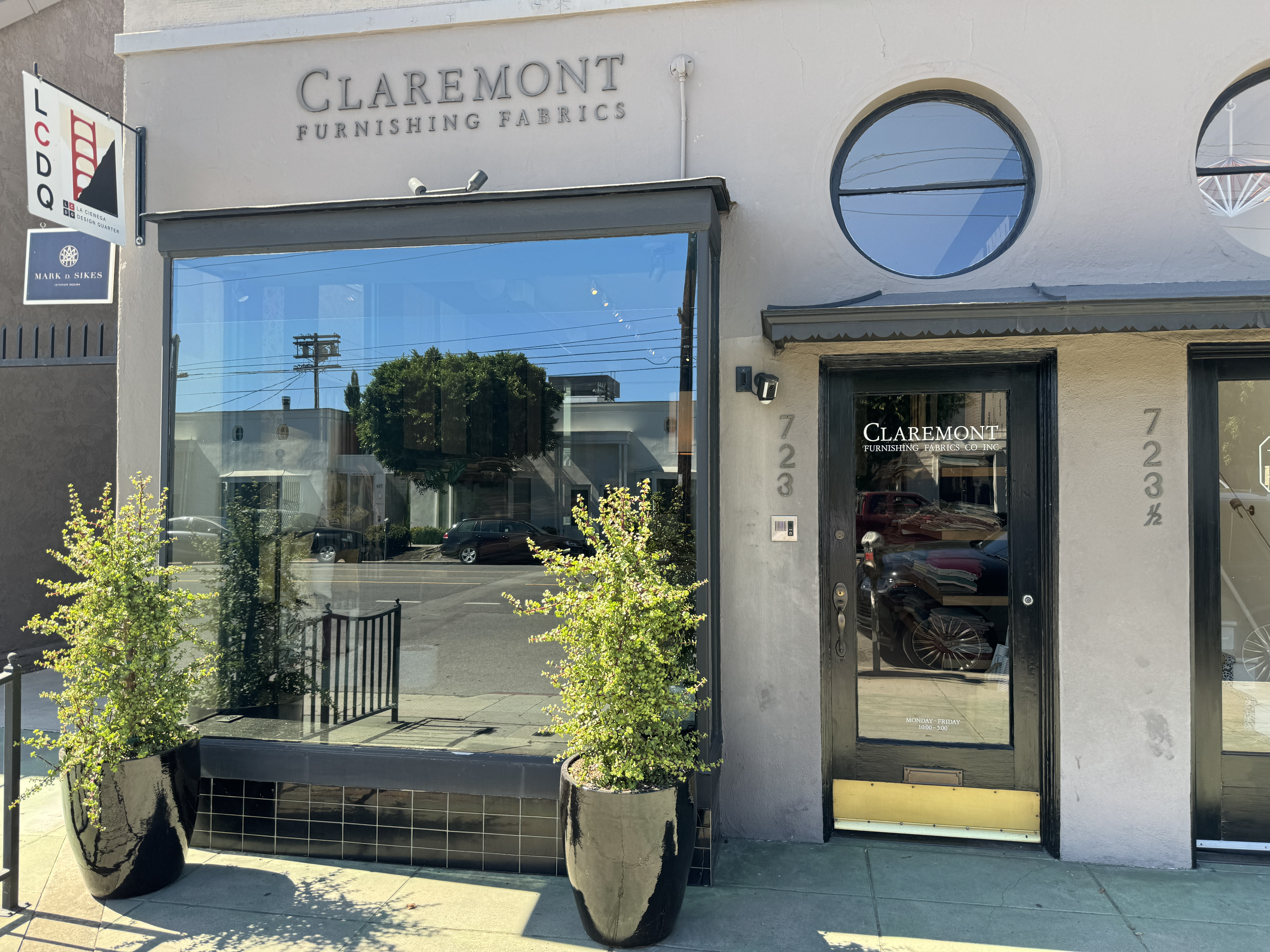
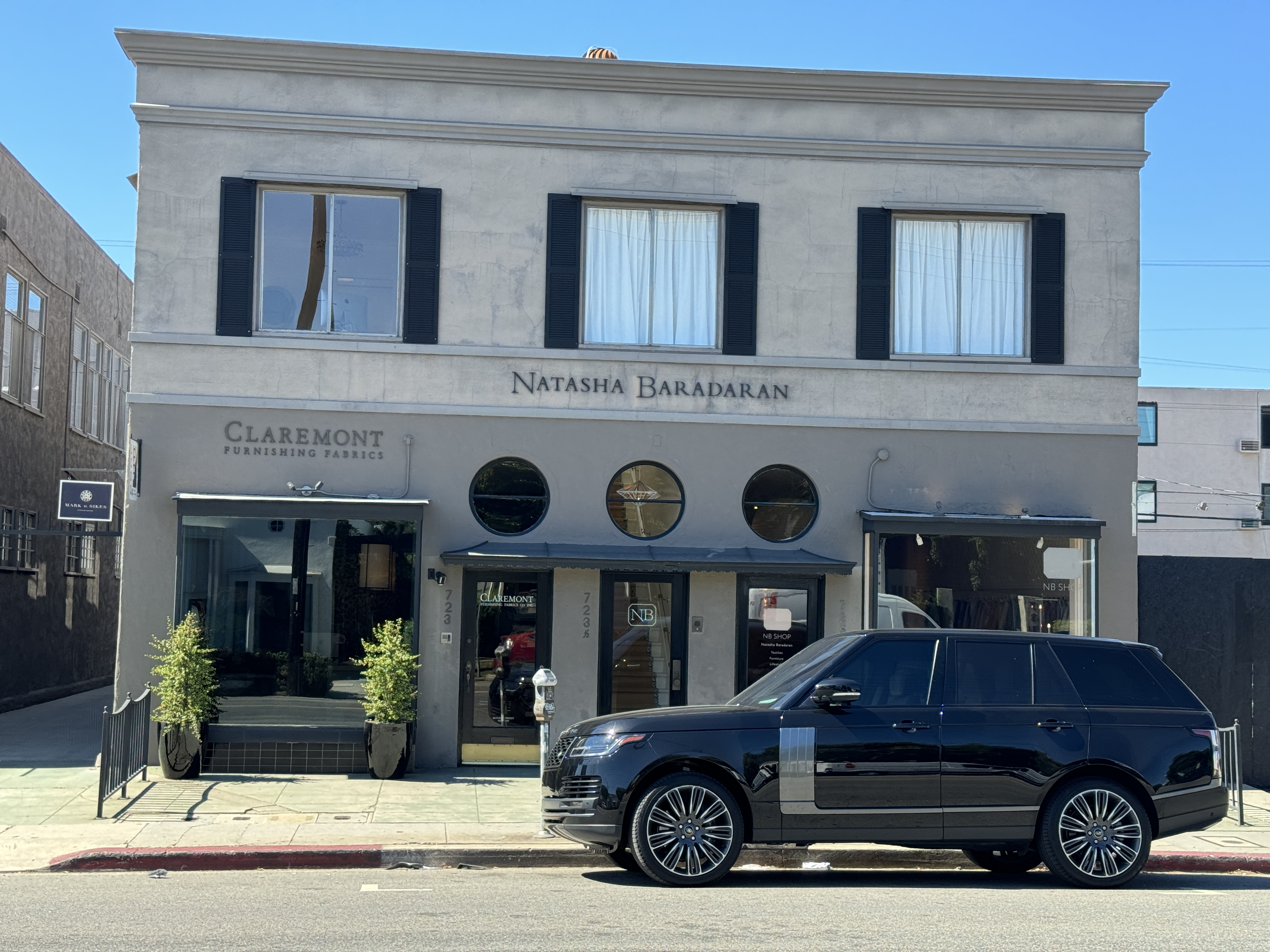
Ferus Gallery site for most of its existence (in 2023)

The Ferus Gallery was a contemporary art gallery which operated from 1957 to 1966. In 1957, the gallery was located at 736-A North La Cienega Boulevard, Los Angeles in the U.S. state of California. In 1958, it was relocated across the street to 723 North La Cienega Boulevard where it remained until its closing in 1966.

== History ==
The gallery was founded in 1957 by the curator Walter Hopps, his wife Shirley Hopps, the artist Edward Kienholz on La Cienega Boulevard. Walter Hopps and Shirley Hopps ran the gallery.

They called the gallery “Ferus” to honor a person named James Farris who shot himself to death, and was possibly the friend of a friend of Hopps and/or a fellow student at Eagle Rock High School. They spelled the name "Ferus" because the man who designed the gallery's logo, Robert Alexander (a.k.a. “Baza”), a collage artist and poet, thought that spelling looked stronger on the page, and Hopps agreed. Blum stated later that the gallery name meant "for us."

In 1958, Kienholz left to concentrate on producing art, and his stake in the gallery was replaced by Irving Blum. Also at this time, Sayde Moss, a wealthy widow, became a silent partner and with her support the gallery moved across the street to 723 N. La Cienega Boulevard.

Up until the autumn of 1958, the gallery held twenty shows, but had made hardly any sales. Blum persuaded Hopps to reduce the number of represented artists to fourteen (seven from San Francisco and seven from Los Angeles) and transformed the financial health of the gallery.

Under the directorship of Irving Blum from 1958, the gallery exhibited both the West Coast and New York art of the period. It was the first gallery on the West Coast to devote a solo show to Andy Warhol, whom Blum had first met in New York in 1961. Blum also ventured to show other East Coast artists, including Jasper Johns, Roy Lichtenstein, and Frank Stella. Finish Fetish—a style that emphasized gleaming surfaces—and Light and Space—art about perception—were other Ferus-bred styles that allowed L.A. to distinguish itself from the rest of the art world. Artist Ed Ruscha has likened the gallery to a jazz catalog "where there are a lot of different voices under the same record label. Each had a very distinctive take on the world and on his work, and so that made it a very vital place to aspire to and to be."

From 1960 to 1964, art collector Marcia Simon Weisman hosted monthly proselytizing classes for novice collectors, taught by Blum and Hopps. Committed local art collectors such as Robert Rowan, Edwin Janss, Betty Asher, and author Michael Blankfort were loyal clients.

Hopps left in 1962 to become curator and, later, director of the Pasadena Art Museum. Ferus closed in 1967 when Blum sought "a financial leg up" by opening Ferus/Pace with Arne Glimcher, owner of New York's Pace Gallery. That venture lasted less than two years. Blum operated the Irving Blum Gallery until his departure for New York City in 1972 where in partnership with Joseph Helman he opened the BlumHelman Gallery; he returned full-time to Los Angeles in 1998 as a private dealer. From 1965, the offices of the art magazine Artforum were situated above the gallery, before moving to New York City in 1967.

== Notable exhibitions ==
The inaugural exhibition at the Ferus Gallery was Objects on the New Landscape Demanding of the Eye (March 15 – April 11, 1957), a group show including the work of Frank Lobdell, Jay DeFeo, Craig Kauffman, Richard Diebenkorn, John Altoon and Clyfford Still. Sonia Gechtoff was also in that show in addition to being the first artist to have a solo show at Ferus, in 1957.

In 1957, the gallery was temporarily closed after LAPD officers arrested and charged Wallace Berman with obscenity over work in his exhibition. It was his first and last solo show.

In July 1962, Andy Warhol: Campbell's Soup Cans was Andy Warhol's first solo pop art exhibition and the first exhibition of the Soup Cans. Five of the canvases sold for $100 each, but Hopps and his then wife, Shirley Nielsen Blum cancelled some of the sales to keep the set intact. At least two sales were completed, with Warhol restoring the original set with other 'duplicate' paintings that he had already painted, with the gallery buying ownership of 32 paintings for $1000.

Los Angeles artists who had their first solo shows at the gallery included: Wallace Berman (1957), Billy Al Bengston (1958), Ed Moses (1958), Robert Irwin (1959), John Mason (1959), Kenneth Price (1960), Llyn Foulkes (1962), Larry Bell (1962) and Ed Ruscha (1963).

== Legacy ==
Hunter Drohojowska-Philp, a chronicler of the 1960s Los Angeles art scene, wrote that the Ferus founders "would eventually transform Los Angeles," because of "[t]heir synergy with one another and with musicians, actors, photographers, fashion designers and architects."

The Los Angeles County Museum of Art organized "Late Fifties at the Ferus" in 1968, and the Newport Harbor Art Museum organized "The Last Time I Saw Ferus" in 1976. In 2002, Gagosian Gallery, New York, mounted an exhibition of about 45 sculptures, paintings, drawings and other artworks by 22 artists shown at Ferus during its 10-year lifetime. Assembled by Irving Blum, the show also included Ferus Gallery exhibition announcements by Lichtenstein and others, several art scene photographs taken by Dennis Hopper, and an elaborate, 144-page catalog. In 2007, "The Cool School" was released, a documentary film about the Ferus Gallery and its eccentric artists.

In 2010, the Samuel Freeman gallery in Santa Monica created a replica of the Ferus within its own walls. The exhibition featured the original door that stood at the entrance of the Ferus plus a full-scale re-creation of the gallery's 1960 solo Bengston exhibition. As well in January 2010 The Ferus Gallery reopened its doors at the original site at 723 N La Cienega in Los Angeles under the directorship of Tim Nye of Nyehaus and Franklin Parrasch Galleries with an exhibition entitled Ferus Gallery Greatest Hits Vol. 1. and featured many of the original stable of artists, including Craig Kauffman, Billy Al Bengston, Kenneth Price and Ed Ruscha.
