= Kenneth Price =

American artist (1935–2021)

- Tamed, whiteware and acrylic paint, Kenneth Price, 1984, Metropolitan Museum of Art
- Born: Kenneth Price; February 16, 1935; Los Angeles, California, US
- Died: February 24, 2012 (aged 77); Arroyo Hondo, New Mexico, US
- Education: Chouinard Art Institute; Otis Art Institute; University of Southern California; The Art Institute of California - Los Angeles; New York State College of Ceramics at Alfred University
- Known for: Painting, Ceramics
- Movement: Fetish Finish
- Spouse: Happy Ward (m. 1968)

Kenneth Price (February 16, 1935 – February 24, 2012) was an American artist who predominantly created ceramic sculpture. He studied at the Chouinard Art Institute and Otis Art Institute (now Otis College of Art and Design) in Los Angeles, before receiving his BFA degree from the University of Southern California in 1956. He continued his studies at Chouinard Art Institute in 1957 and received an MFA degree from New York State College of Ceramics at Alfred University in 1959. Kenneth Price studied ceramics with Peter Voulkos at Otis and was awarded a Tamarind Fellowship.

He is best known for his abstract shapes constructed from fired clay. Typically, they are not glazed, but intricately painted with multiple layers of bright acrylic paint and then sanded down to reveal the colors beneath. Price lived and worked in Venice, California, and Taos, New Mexico.

== Biography ==
=== Early life ===
Price was born February 16, 1935, and raised in West Hollywood, Los Angeles, California. in 1937 when Price was approximately two years old, his family moved into a trailer on Santa Monica Beach for two years, next to Marion Davies's home, while building a new house in Pacific Palisades. In 1949, Price began at University High School, at which time he took up surfing. In 1952 while at University High, Price received a scholarship to attend Chouinard Art Institute (now California Institute of the Arts), where he took classes in life drawing and cartooning taught by T. Hee.

Price's earliest aspirations were to be an artist, "As far back as I can remember, I always wanted to be an artist. Even when I was a kid I would make drawings and little books, and cartoons..," he states. Price enrolled in his first art ceramics course at Santa Monica City College in 1954, where he quickly embraced a formal craft tradition as espoused by Marguerite Wildenhain. He subsequently studied at the Chouinard Art Institute in Los Angeles, before receiving his BFA degree from the University of Southern California in 1956.

As a student at USC, Price spent time visiting the ceramics studio at the Otis Art Institute where ceramic artist Peter Voulkos was teaching. Price has often cited Voulkos as his strongest single influence as a student. After finishing his degree at USC, Price spent a portion of the next year as a graduate student at Otis. There he studied (under Voulkos) with Billy Al Bengston, John Mason, Mike Frimkess, Paul Soldner, Henry Takemoto and Jerry Rothman. Price writes about the group at Otis: "We've been cited as the people who broke away from the crafts hierarchy and substituted so-called 'total freedom!' Actually we were a group of people who were committed to clay as a material and wanted to use it in ways that had something to do with our time and place."

In 1958, Price left Otis for Alfred University (with a six-month detour in the Army Reserves). "I went to Alfred to try and develop some low-fire, brightly colored glazes, but also to try and get away from the influence of Voulkos, which was very strong on me." During his time at Alfred, Price was able to formulate some of the glazes he desired, using a lead base. In 1959, Price returned to Los Angeles having received an MFA in Ceramics from the New York State College of Ceramics at Alfred University.

=== Mid career ===
Price describes Los Angeles upon his return and the beginnings of the L.A. art scene: "When I started out in L.A. in the late fifties there was no art scene at all really. I mean there was an art scene in New York, but there wasn't one in L.A. There were hardly any galleries. The museum was downtown and it didn't endorse contemporary art. And there were only about three viable art publications. The local newspaper critics didn't like us at all. There weren't any collectors, really very few. We made few sales, and for little money when we made them. But the people I knew were totally committed. And so was I. I was confused about a lot of things at that time, but not about being an artist. I knew that's what I had to be. And then later, around the mid-sixties, the whole scene cooked up: galleries, museums, foundations, art schools, and you know, lots more artists."

Price's first solo show came at the Ferus Gallery in 1960 where he quickly became part of a developing art movement that included artists such as Larry Bell, Billy Al Bengston, John Altoon, John McCracken, Robert Irwin and Ed Ruscha, among many others. Price would have three solo shows during the short time Ferus was open, and by the mid-1960s Price was a fixture in the west coast art scene. Aside from six months Price spent in Japan in 1962, Price would remain in Los Angeles until 1970, when he and his wife, Happy, relocated to Taos, New Mexico.

Price's second solo museum exhibition was in 1978 at LACMA, where he presented the project that had consumed him for six years, Happy's Curios (1972–77), named in honor of his wife Happy. This was a room size installation made up of several wood cabinets with open shelves filled with highly colored glazed ceramic pots, plates, bowls, and cups that owed its inspiration to Mexican folk pottery.

As Price's career developed he began using a different approach to finishing his ceramic sculptures. In 1983, Price and his wife moved to coastal Massachusetts, where they stayed for the next eight years. The move coincided with a massive shift in Price's work that would last until the end of his career, the move from glazes to acrylic paint. The technique Price began to develop during this period involved priming the fired ceramic sculpture with more than a dozen layers of acrylic paint. In 1991 After the Exhibition, Finish Fetish: L.A.'s Cool School, at Fisher Gallery at University of Southern California, several professors encourage Price to join the faculty. He becomes a professor of ceramics at USC where he teaches for 10 years. During that time back in Los Angeles, his son, Jackson, began to work with him in the studio, and Price experimented with using a cloth or cotton swab soaked in alcohol to work through layers of paint. This technique allowed for a blurred effect that achieved a new type of smoothness to the work. In the late 1990s, Price refined his technique still further, beginning to dry sand his acrylic painted surfaces. A technique he borrowed from the surfboard workshop according to Dave Hickey. Price was known to apply as many as a hundred layers of paint to a piece, in up to seven different colors.

=== Late career ===
In 2001 Price became professor emeritus at USC. In 2002 Price and Happy returned permanently to Taos, where they built a studio attached to their home. In 2007 Price was diagnosed with cancer. After treatments in Los Angeles, he returned to Taos.

“Ken Price Sculpture: A Retrospective” bears the unique distinction of being the final show the artist helped plan. During his last two and a half years, before his death in February 2012 at age 77, Price contributed extensively to preparations for the show, which was organized by the Los Angeles County Museum of Art and designed by Frank Gehry, the artist's friend since the 1960s.

In 2010, Price and his son Jackson opened Studio B, where they began to make much larger work. In 2011 Price was awarded the USC Faculty Lifetime Achievement Award.

Ken Price died on February 24, 2012, at his home in Taos, New Mexico.

In September 2012, Price was the subject of a 50-year retrospective opening at the Los Angeles County Museum of Art and traveling to the Nasher Sculpture Center and the Metropolitan Museum of Art. In honor of the artist, the museum has displayed his 2011 piece "Zizi" in the lobby of its Ahmanson Building. “Ken Price Sculpture: A Retrospective” bears the unique distinction of being the final show the artist helped to plan. During his last two and a half years, before his death in February 2012 at age 77, Price contributed extensively to preparations for the show, which was organized by the Los Angeles County Museum of Art and designed by Frank Gehry, the artist's friend since the 1960s.

Hot Bottoms, watercolor on paper, 2005

In September 2013, Price was also the subject of a works on paper retrospective titled 'Slow and Steady Wins the Race, Works on Paper, 1962–2010' at the Albright–Knox Art Gallery, Drawing Center, and the Harwood Museum of Art.

His work is held in the permanent collections of several museums, including the Whitney Museum of American Art, the Santa Barbara Museum of Art, the Museum of Modern Art, the University of Michigan Museum of Art, the Norton Simon Museum, and the Smithsonian American Art Museum.

== Museum collections ==
- Albright–Knox Art Gallery, Buffalo, NY
- Albuquerque Museum, Albuquerque, NM
- American Craft Museum, New York, NY
- Art Institute of Chicago, Chicago, IL
- Art Museum of South Texas, Corpus Christi, TX
- Carnegie Museum of Art, Pittsburgh, PA
- Cincinnati Art Museum, Cincinnati, OH
- Crocker Art Museum, Sacramento, CA
- Dallas Museum of Art, Dallas, TX
- Denver Art Museum, Denver, CO
- Everson Museum of Art, Syracuse, NY
- Harwood Museum of Art, Taos, NM
- Hirshhorn Museum and Sculpture Garden, Washington, D.C.
- Joslyn Art Museum, Omaha, NE
- KMAC Museum, Louisville, KY
- Lannan Foundation, Los Angeles, CA
- Los Angeles County Museum of Art, Los Angeles, CA
- Menil Collection, Houston, TX
- Metropolitan Museum of Art, New York, NY
- Minneapolis Institute of Art, Minneapolis, MN
- Mint Museum, Charlotte, NC
- Museum of Contemporary Art, Los Angeles, CA
- Museum of Modern Art, New York, NY
- Museum Overholland, Nieuwersluis, Netherlands
- National Gallery of Art, Washington, D.C.
- Nelson-Atkins Museum of Art, Kansas City, MO
- Oakland Museum of California, Oakland, CA
- Philadelphia Museum of Art, Philadelphia, PA
- Renwick Gallery, Smithsonian Museum of American Art, Washington, D.C.
- Rhode Island School of Design Museum, Providence, RI
- Saint Louis Art Museum, St. Louis, MO
- San Francisco Museum of Modern Art, San Francisco, CA
- Santa Barbara Museum of Art, Santa Barbara, CA
- Schein-Joseph International Museum of Ceramic Art, Alfred University, Alfred, NY
- Seattle Art Museum, Seattle, WA
- Speed Art Museum, Louisville, KY
- Stedelijk Museum, Amsterdam, Netherlands
- Walker Art Center, Minneapolis, MN
- Whitney Museum of American Art, New York, NY
- Worcester Art Museum, Worcester, MA

== Additional sources ==
- Los Angeles County Museum of Art, Robert Irwin―Kenneth Price, Los Angeles County Museum of Art, Los Angeles, 1966.
- Price, Kenneth, Ken Price, Houston, Texas, Menil Collection, Houston Fine Art Press, 1992.
- Price, Kenneth, Ken Price, Happy's Curios, Los Angeles, The Museum, 1978.
- University of California, Irvine, Five Los Angeles Sculptors: Larry Bell, Tony DeLap, David Gray, John McCracken, Kenneth Price, University of California, Irvine, 1966
