= Morgan Neville =

American film producer, director, and writer (born 1967)

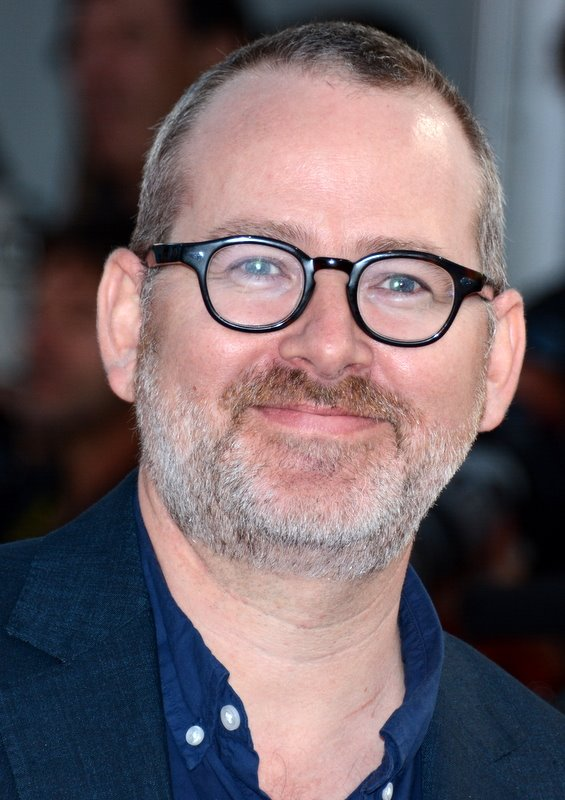
- Neville at the Deauville; American Film Festival in 2013
- Born: October 10, 1967 (age 58); Los Angeles, California, U.S.
- Education: University of Pennsylvania (BFA)
- Occupations: Film producer; director; writer
- Years active: 1993–present
- Notable work: 20 Feet from Stardom; Best of Enemies; Won't You Be My Neighbor?

Morgan Neville (born October 10, 1967) is an American filmmaker. His 2014 film 20 Feet from Stardom won the Academy Award for Best Documentary Feature, as well as a Grammy Award for Best Music Film. His documentary Best of Enemies (2015), on the debates between Gore Vidal and William F. Buckley, was shortlisted for the 2016 Academy Award and won an Emmy Award. His 2018 film Won't You Be My Neighbor?, a documentary about Fred Rogers, received critical acclaim and became the highest-grossing biographical documentary of all time.

Neville has been nominated for six additional Grammys for films including Piece by Piece, Shangri-La, Respect Yourself: The Stax Records Story, Muddy Waters: Can’t Be Satisfied, Johnny Cash’s America, and The Music of Strangers: Yo-Yo Ma and the Silk Road Ensemble. Neville's other films include Man on the Run, The Cool School, Shotgun Freeway, Keith Richards: Under the Influence, and, as producer, Miss Americana, Beauty Is Embarrassing, and Crossfire Hurricane.

For television, Neville directed and executive produced the series Ugly Delicious, Abstract: The Art of Design, Chelsea Does, and Song Exploder.

== Biography and career ==
Neville was born in Los Angeles, California, graduated from the University of Pennsylvania and originally worked as a journalist in New York City and San Francisco before moving into film production in 1993. He founded Tremolo Productions in 1999.

Neville's films focus on culture, especially contemporary music. Speaking about his 2016 film The Music of Strangers, Neville said "The best thing about it for me as a filmmaker ... is that not only do I get to indulge my musical love, but that music is, to me, the most amazing Trojan horse to tell any other kind of story. The best music films are not about music ... Music is just the language we're speaking to tell a story about culture."

Since finding success with his music-related documentaries, Neville has focused on other aspects of culture, such as politics and media. In a 2014 blog post on the International Documentary Association's website, Neville wrote that he is drawn to "how a smaller story can be a perfect window into conflicts within the human condition." His 2015 film Best of Enemies examines the televised debates between Gore Vidal and William F. Buckley and serves as a timely investigation into politics and media. His film Won't You Be My Neighbor, about legendary television host Fred Rogers, premiered at the Sundance Film Festival to rave reviews, and focuses on the power that kindness and understanding can have in a community, whether real or imagined.

== Personal life ==
Neville lives in Pasadena, California with his wife and two children.

== Filmography ==
=== Feature-length films ===
- Shotgun Freeway: Drives Through Lost L.A. (1995)
- Brian Wilson: A Beach Boy's Tale (1999)
- Sam Phillips: The Man Who Invented Rock'n'Roll (2000)
- Muddy Waters Can't Be Satisfied (2003)
- Hank Williams: Honky Tonk Blues (2004)
- The Cool School (2008)
- Johnny Cash's America (2008)
- Search and Destroy: Iggy & The Stooges' Raw Power (2010)
- Troubadours (2011)
- 20 Feet from Stardom (2013)
- Best of Enemies: Buckley vs. Vidal (2015)
- The Music of Strangers (2015)
- Keith Richards: Under the Influence (2015)
- Won't You Be My Neighbor? (2018)
- They'll Love Me When I'm Dead (2018)
- Roadrunner: A Film About Anthony Bourdain (2021)
- Mickey: The Story of a Mouse (2022)
- The Saint of Second Chances (2023)
- STEVE! (martin) a documentary in 2 pieces (2024)
- Piece by Piece (2024)
- Man on the Run (2025)
- Breakdown: 1975 (2025)
- Lorne (2026)

=== Television ===
- Respect Yourself: The Stax Records Story (2007)
- Chelsea Does (2016)
- Abstract: The Art of Design (2017)
- Ugly Delicious (2018)
- Shangri-La (2019)
- Song Exploder (2020)
- Watch the Sound with Mark Ronson (2021)
