= Museum of Contemporary Art San Diego =

Museum in California, US

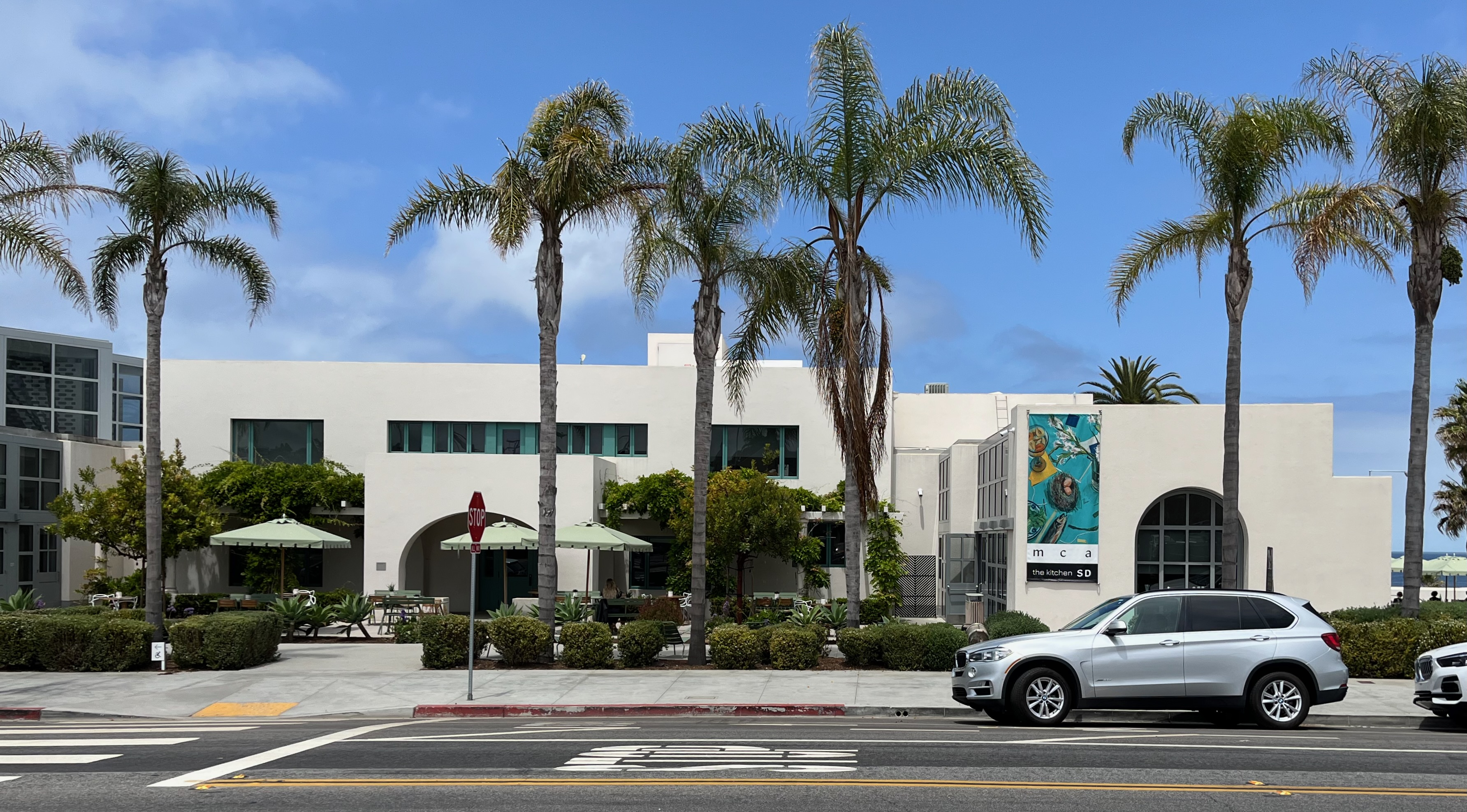

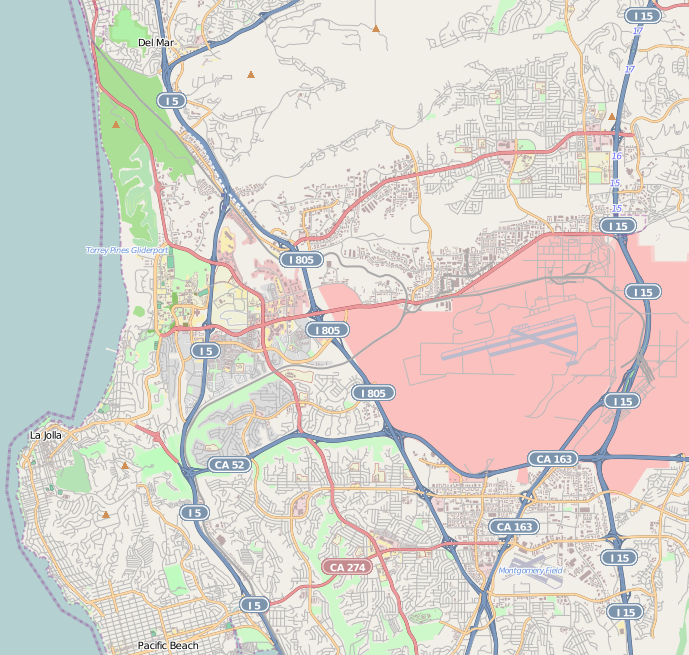
- Location within Northwestern San Diego
- Former name: The Art Center in La Jolla, La Jolla Art Museum, La Jolla Museum of Contemporary Art, San Diego Museum of Contemporary Art
- Established: 1941
- Location: San Diego, California, U.S.
- Coordinates: 32°50′40″N 117°16′41″W
- Type: Art Museum
- Website: www.mcasd.org

The Museum of Contemporary Art San Diego (MCASD) is an art museum in La Jolla, a community of San Diego, California. It is focused on the collection, preservation, exhibition, and interpretation of works of art from 1950 to the present.

== Binational mandate ==
Located in the border city of San Diego, the museum's binational mandate includes a focus on artists from both sides of the US/Mexico border, celebrating both San Diego and Tijuana’s artistic communities. MCASD has held several exhibitions that explore cross-border themes, including Being Here With You / Estando aquí contigo: 42 Artists from San Diego and Tijuana, The Very Large Array: San Diego/Tijuana Artists in the MCA Collection and Strange New World: Art and Design from Tijuana.

In 2023, artists Celia Álvarez Muñoz and Griselda Rosas exhibited their artwork to express their lived experiences from living on both U.S. and Mexico borderlands. More than 35 pieces of art were exhibited by these two artists. They exhibited their special representations of artwork including sculptural installations, textile drawings, embroidery, book projects, and photographic series. Both exhibit a unique and share a circulation of cultures with their artwork.

== Locations ==
MCASD has two sites, about 13.2 miles (21 km) apart:

MCASD – 700 Prospect St, La Jolla, CA 92037.

Located on a 3-acre oceanfront campus (1.2 ha), MCASD's flagship La Jolla location was originally an Irving Gill–designed residence, built in 1916 for philanthropist Ellen Browning Scripps. Since opening in 1941, the property has undergone several expansions. Mosher & Drew completed a series of expansions in 1950, 1960, and again in the late 1970s; and a renovation by Venturi Scott Brown & Associates was done in 1996. In 2017, MCASD began its most recent expansion led by architect Annabelle Selldorf, which increased its size and added a public park. The La Jolla location reopened to the public after its four-year renovation on April 9, 2022.

MCASD Downtown – 1100 Kettner Boulevard, San Diego, CA 92101.

In 1986 MCASD established a small gallery space in downtown San Diego and later opened a larger downtown outpost in 1993 inside America Plaza adjacent to the San Diego Trolley line, designed by artists Robert Irwin and Richard Fleischner along with architect David Raphael Singer. In 2007, MCASD expanded its downtown facility with two buildings.

- Joan and Irwin Jacobs Building – The Jacobs Building is named for philanthropists Joan and Irwin Jacobs. It was formerly the baggage building for the landmark Santa Fe Depot, built in 1915-16 for the Panama–California Exposition. The Jacobs building has featured large-scale installations and sculptures including Maya Lin's Systematic Landscapes. Commissioned by MCASD, Richard Serra’s Santa Fe Depot (2004), six cube-like structures weighing a collective 156 tons, is located behind the building.
- David C. Copley Building – In 2004, benefactor David C. Copley supported the construction of a new building that would occupy the site adjacent to the Jacobs Building. The Copley Building is outfitted with two specially commissioned permanent installations which feature Light and Space art. Roman De Salvo made light fixtures of industrial materials for walls of the stairwell. Outside the building, Jenny Holzer created a parade of her trademark truisms to be spelled out vertically in light-emitting diodes. The words run through clear plastic tubes that she calls icicles.

== History ==
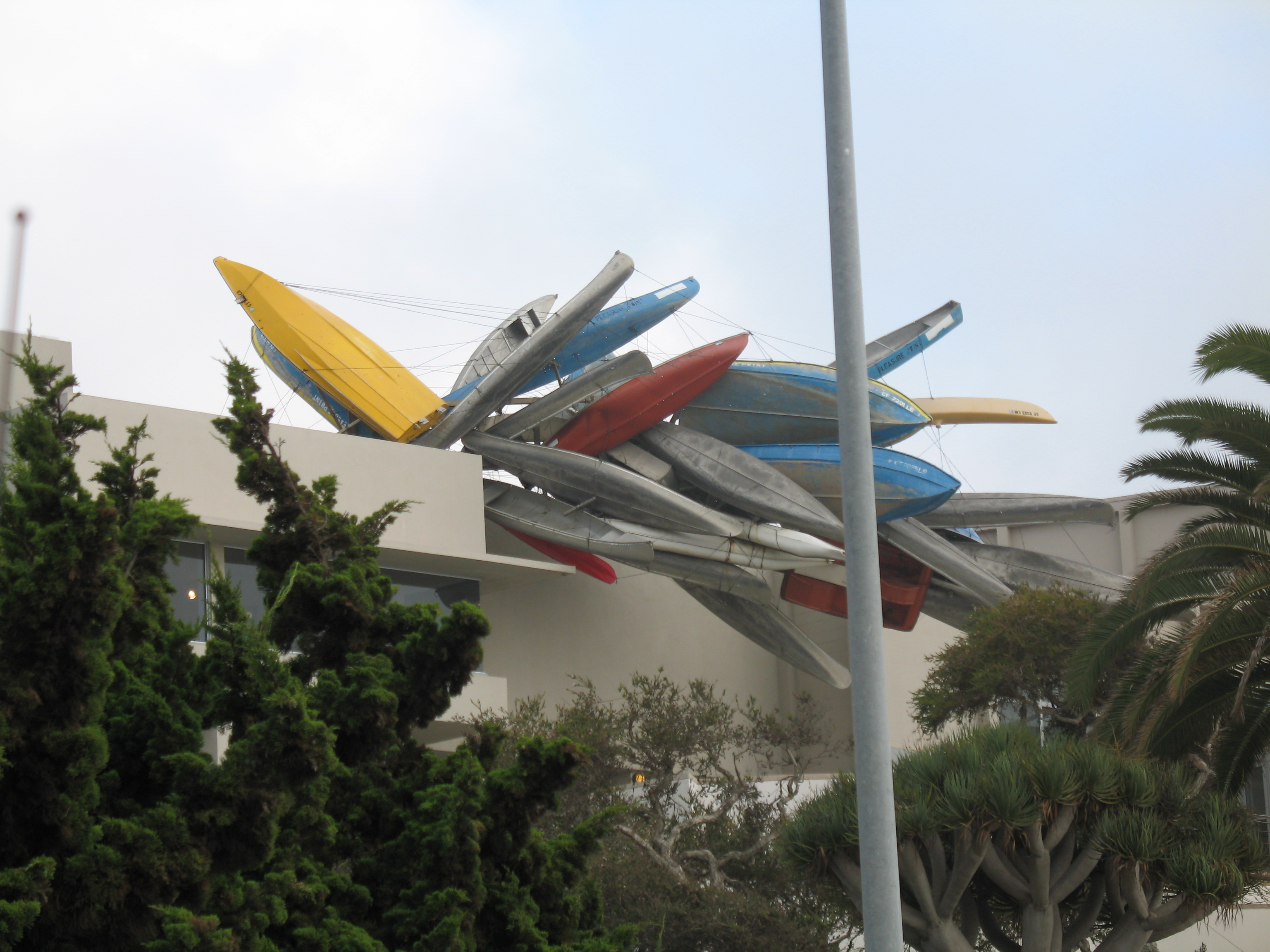
A large art piece displayed projecting out from the La Jolla museum roof in 2007

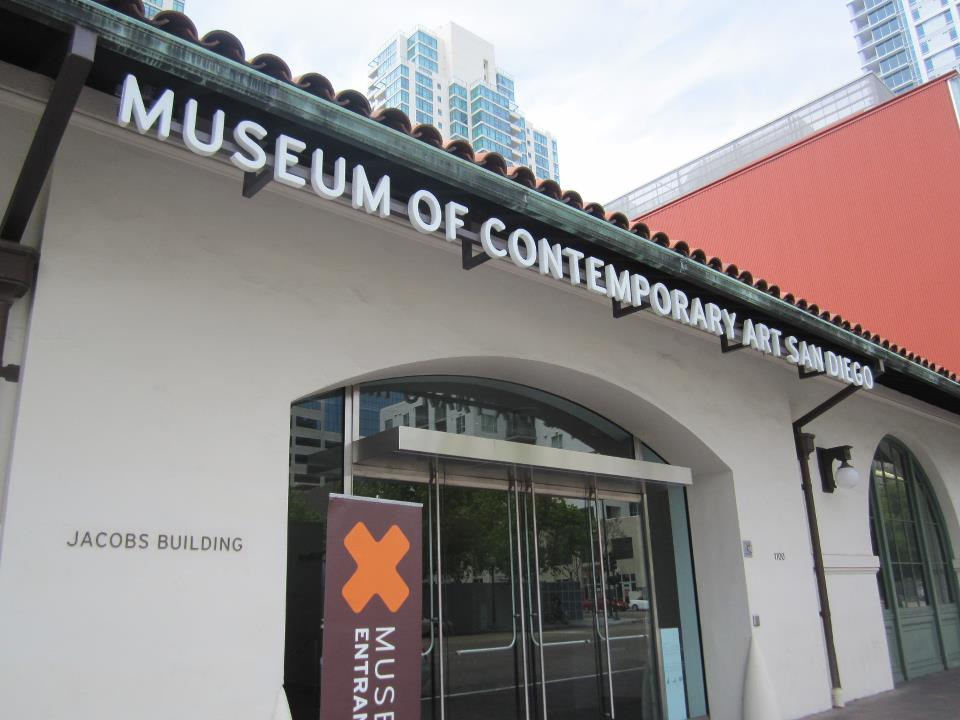
The entrance of Museum of Contemporary Art, downtown San Diego

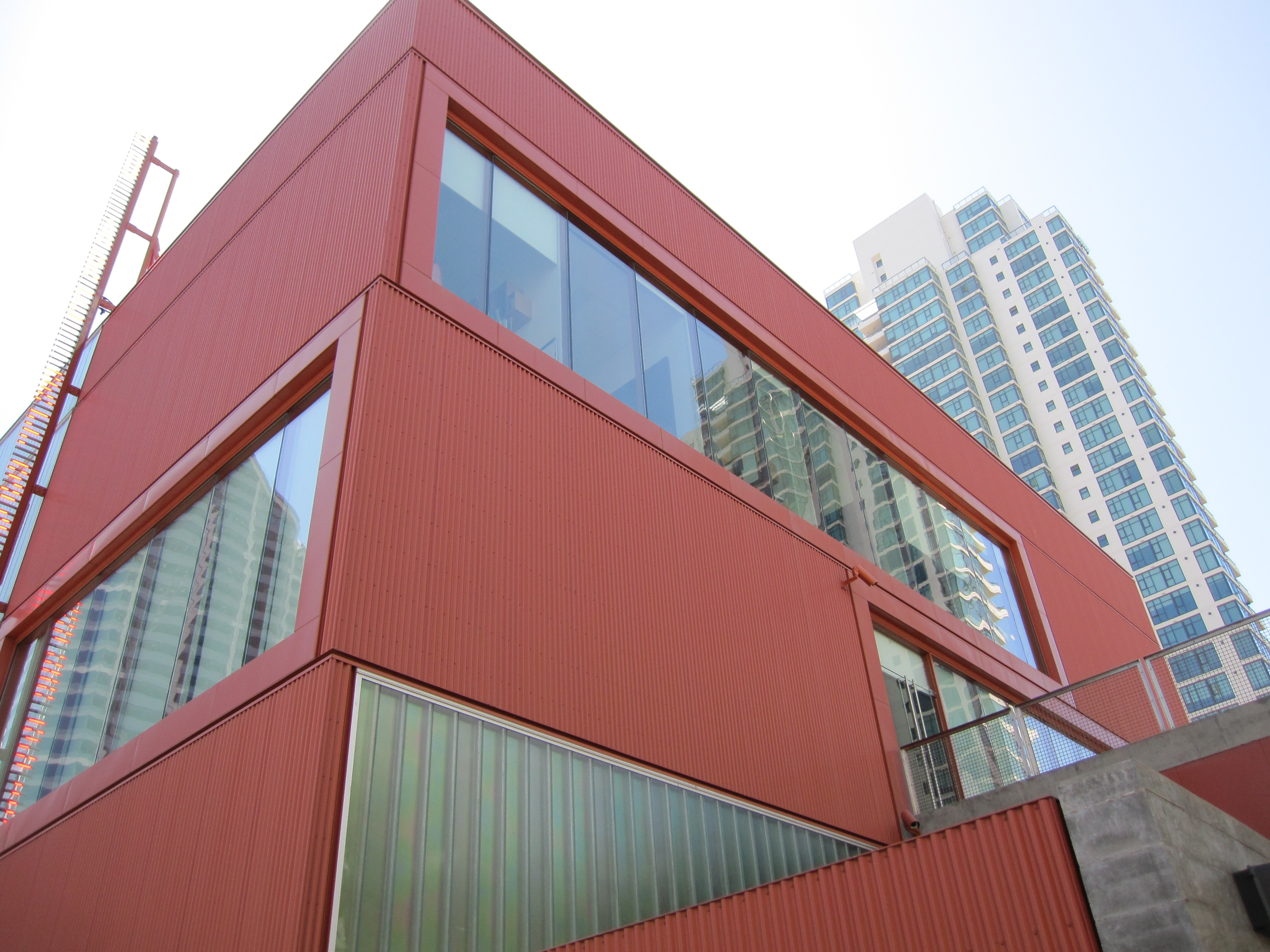
Museum of Contemporary Art, downtown San Diego

Founded in 1941 in La Jolla as The Art Center in La Jolla, a community art center, through the 1950s and 1960s the organization operated as the La Jolla Art Museum. The museum was originally the 1915 residence of newspaper heiress and philanthropist Ellen Browning Scripps, designed by the noted architect Irving Gill.

In the early 1970s, the name changed to the La Jolla Museum of Contemporary Art, focusing the purview on the period from 1950 to the present. In 1990, the museum changed its name to San Diego Museum of Contemporary Art, only to change it to Museum of Contemporary Art San Diego, after confusion developed between its name and the San Diego Museum of Art. The new name also acknowledged the larger geographic context and the population base of nearly 3 million in San Diego County, and opened a $1.2-million satellite facility downtown in 1993, further embracing the region.

In 1996, a major $9.2 million renovation and expansion of MCASD La Jolla took place, designed by Robert Venturi of the firm Venturi Scott Brown & Associates. Venturi's 30,000 square feet (2,800 square metres) addition included four more galleries, doubling the museum's exhibition space to 10,000 square feet (930 square metres). It also expanded the museum's educational space, storage space, bookstore library and restaurant. It transformed the garden into an outdoor exhibition space for sculpture.

In 2007, a $25-million downtown location of the museum was opened, designed by architect Richard Gluckman of Gluckman Mayner Architects, New York. The expansion added 30,000 square feet (2,800 square metres) of space to the downtown site and increases its exhibition space from about 6,000 square feet (560 square metres) to 16,500 square feet (1,530 square metres). At the north end of the building is a three-story structure of corrugated steel and textured glass. It houses curatorial offices, art-handling and storage facilities, an art education classroom, a lecture hall that opens onto a terrace and a boardroom with a view of the harbor. The renovated baggage building is named for Irwin M. Jacobs, founder of the technology company Qualcomm, and his wife, Joan. The three-story Modernist structure bears the name of philanthropist and newspaper publisher David C. Copley.

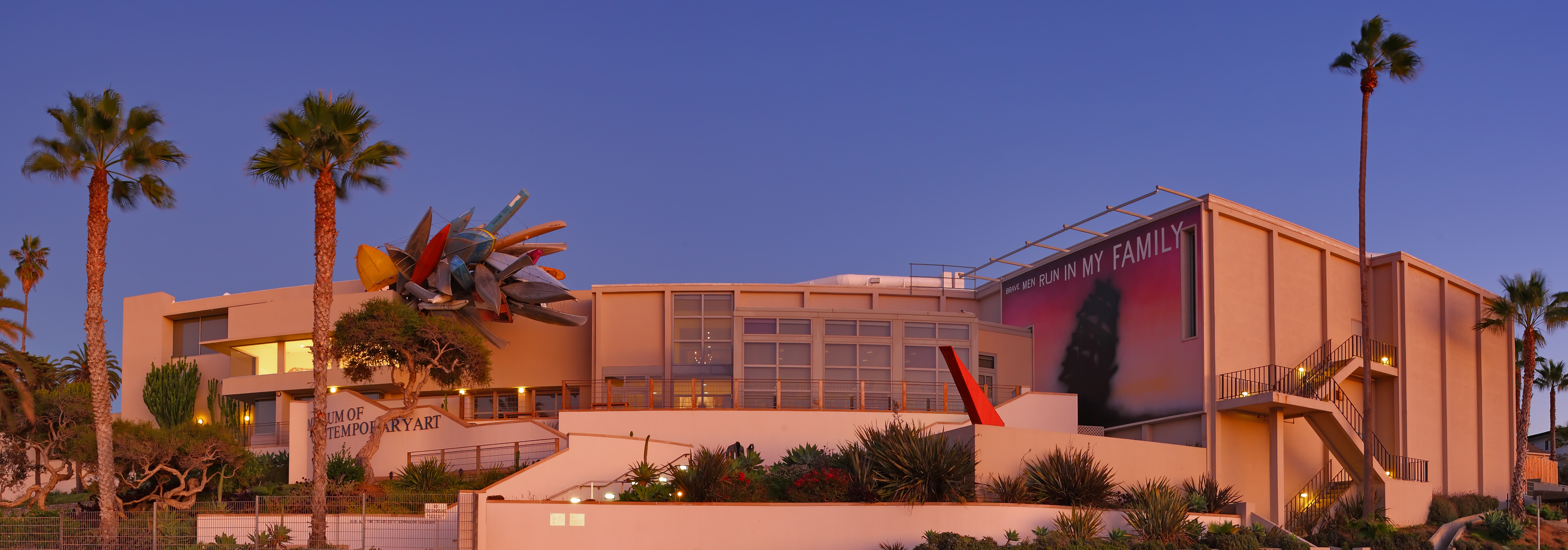
Picture of the Museum of Contemporary Art, San Diego

In 2014, the Museum of Contemporary Art San Diego chose architect Annabelle Selldorf to head a $30 million expansion tripling the size of the museum's location in La Jolla. Upon completion, the museum had 3,700 square metres (40,000 square feet) of gallery space to exhibit the permanent collection, as well as additional space for education. The museum's footprint was expanded to include properties (now residential but owned by the museum) on both sides of the institution, and the space that previously housed the Sherwood Auditorium was reconfigured as a gallery with exhibit space of approximately 740 square metres (8,000 square feet).

== Collection ==
The Museum of Contemporary Art has a nearly 5,500-object collection of post-World War II art that includes key pieces by color field painter Ellsworth Kelly, minimalist sculptor Donald Judd and renowned California installation artist Robert Irwin. In 2012, museum received 30 contemporary pieces from the 1950s to 1980s, with artworks from Piero Manzoni, Ad Dekkers, Christo, Jules Olitski and Franz Kline, as well as California artists Craig Kauffman and Ron Davis, from the collection of Vance E. Kondon and his wife Elisabeth Giesberger.

As a site-specific installation, Irwin created 1° 2° 3° 4° (1997), consisting of squarish apertures cut into three lightly tinted museum windows so visitors have an unmediated view of the horizon line separating sea and sky and can feel the ocean breeze.

=== Notable works ===
- Richard Hunt, Linear Peregrine Forms, 1962
- Ellsworth Kelly, Red Blue Green, 1963
- Andy Warhol, Liz Taylor Diptych, 1963
- John Baldessari, Terms Most Usefull…, 1966-1968
- Helen Pashgian, untitled, 1968-1969
- Maren Hassinger, Wallflower, 1975
- Jack Whitten, Chinese Sincerity, 1974
- John Valadez, Pool Party, 1986
- Lorna Simpson, Guarded Conditions, 1989
- Tschabalala Self, Evening, 2019
- Mely Barragan, Black Light, 2017

=== Deaccessioning ===
In May 2021, MCASD sent nine paintings and one sculpture from its collection to auction in New York, selling works by Roy Lichtenstein, Conrad Marca-Relli, Lorser Feitelson and six other postwar American artists for nearly $900,000.

== Management ==
MCASD has a permanent endowment fund of over $40 million, and an annual operating budget of approximately $6 million. Annual support comes from a balanced mix of individuals, corporations, foundations, government agencies, and interest earned from the endowment, the majority of which came from a transformational 1999 bequest from Rea and Jackie Axline of more than $30 million.

From 1983 to 2016, Hugh Davies steered the museum as director. From October 2016, Kathryn Kanjo became the museum's director and CEO.

The Museum of Contemporary Art San Diego (MCASD) has named Brett Littman as its new director and CEO, effective early October. He takes over from Kathryn Kanjo, who departed after nine years to direct the UC Irvine Langson Orange County Museum.
