= Billy Al Bengston =

American artist and sculptor (1934–2022)

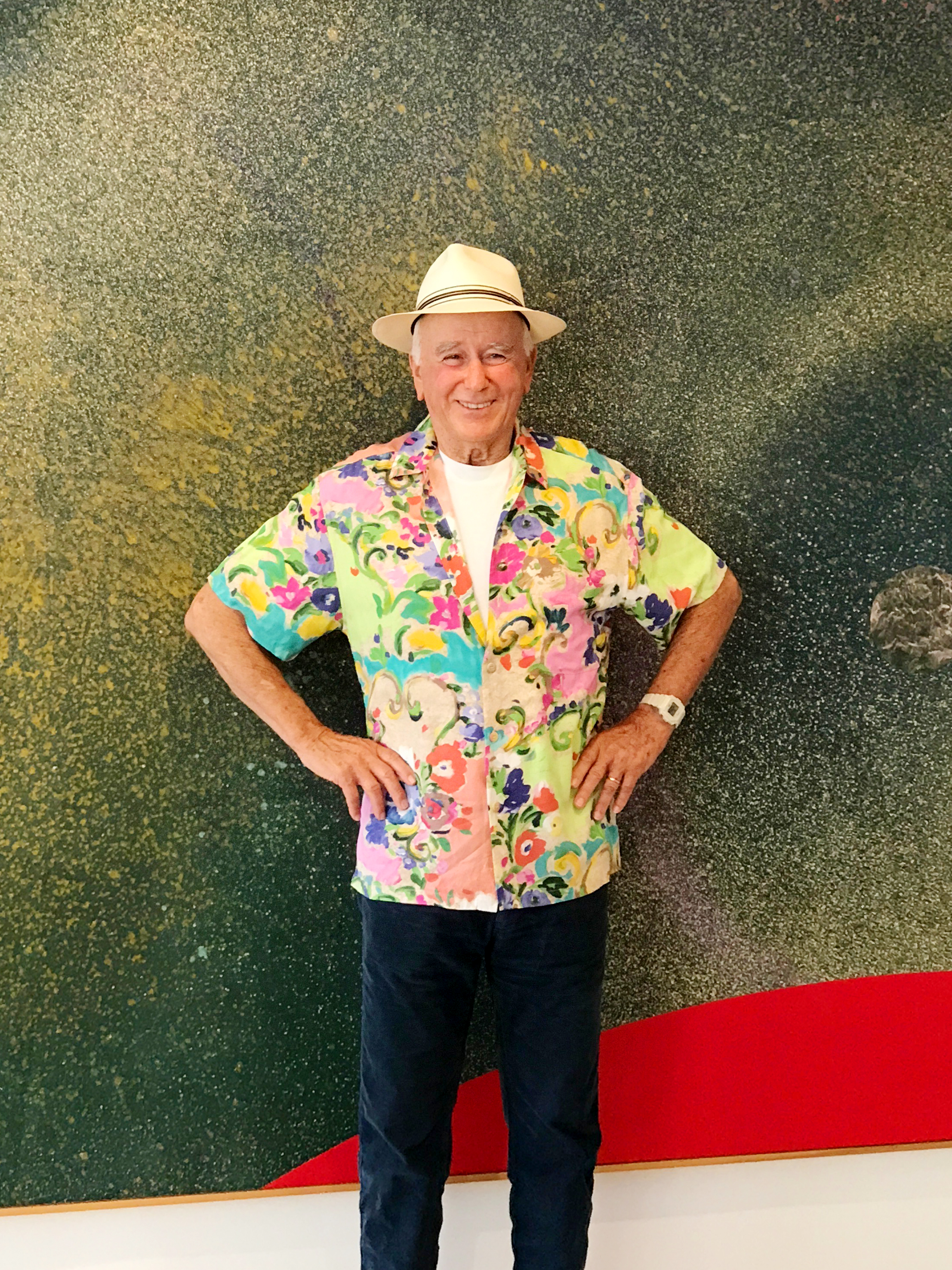
- Bengston in 2017
- Born: July 7, 1934; Dodge City, Kansas, U.S.
- Died: October 8, 2022 (aged 88); Venice, Los Angeles, California, U.S.
- Known for: Painting

Canopus Dracula by Billy Al Bengston, 1977, Honolulu Museum of Art

Billy Al Bengston (June 7, 1934 – October 8, 2022) was an American visual artist and sculptor who lived and worked in Venice, California, and Honolulu, Hawaii. Bengston was probably best known for work he created that reflected California's "Kustom" car and motorcycle culture. He pioneered the use of sprayed layers of automobile lacquer in fine art and often used colors that were psychedelic and shapes that were mandala-like. ARTnews referred to Bengston as a "giant of Los Angeles's postwar art scene."

== Early life and education ==
Bengston was born in Dodge City, Kansas, on June 7, 1934. His family relocated to Los Angeles in 1948. He attended Los Angeles City College in 1952. Subsequently, he studied painting under Richard Diebenkorn and Saburo Hasegawa at the California College of Arts and Crafts, in Oakland, California, in 1955 and returned to Los Angeles to study at Otis Art Institute in 1956.

== Career ==
Bengston began showing with the Ferus Gallery in Los Angeles (founded and run by Walter Hopps and Edward Kienholz, and later Irving Blum), having five shows between 1958 and 1963. As a fixture at the gallery, he was among a cohort of artists that included Kienholz, Ed Ruscha, Larry Bell, Kenneth Price, Ed Moses, and Robert Irwin. (The gallery closed in 1966.) In a 2018 article in Vanity Fair, Bengston recalled that he and Irwin hung the 32 pieces in Andy Warhol's Campbell's soup-can paintings show at Ferus in 1962. He notably described the atmosphere of Ferus as a "macho intellectual gang bang".

After seeing the work of Jasper Johns at the 1958 Venice Biennale he adopted the motif of a set of sergeant's stripes. This recurring chevron image was painted with industrial materials and techniques associated with the decoration of motorcycle fuel tanks and surfboards. According to Grace Glueck of The New York Times, Bengston "was among the first to ditch traditional oil paint on canvas, opting instead for sprayed layers of automobile lacquer on aluminum in soft colors, achieving a highly reflective, translucent surface."

Bengston encouraged viewers in the early 1960s to associate his art with motorcycle subculture; on the cover of a 1961 catalogue for a Ferus show, he was seen straddling a motorcycle. (He also competed in motocross competitions.) "When I painted these motorcycle paintings", Bengston later recalled, "I pissed people off beyond belief. I don't know why. They are just paintings. You don't have to look at them." Bengston also created humorous posters and advertisements for exhibitions which pulled on imagery of the film industry; and he distributed surveys soliciting "the question you would most like to have answered" (1970) and "I'm stuck, $10 for your idea ... for an exhibition mailer or announcement" (1973). "A quality of the expansiveness of the physical environment as well as some of the brittle gloss and gaudiness of the aggressively manmade Los Angeles environment is acutely condensed in his work", John Coplans wrote in Artforum in 1965.

Thomas E. Crow drew attention to the deliberate contrast between Bengston's flamboyant, competitive, aggressively masculine stance and his delicate, modest approach to his art. Silhouettes of iris flowers, for instance, figure prominently in Bengston's paintings. In the 1960s, he often painted a single centrally placed flower (as he also did with the chevron), thus upending the widely held notion that putting an object in the center of a canvas should be avoided at all costs. "I've been doing that ever since year one", he said of this practice, "ever since I learned you shouldn't do it." During the 1970s, Bengston began using multiple iris silhouettes, often surrounded by overlapping circles, as in Canopus Dracula (1977) in the collection of the Honolulu Museum of Art.

Bengston's spare compositions and elaborate yet untraditional processes caused some observers to associate him with the Finish Fetish movement, whose practitioners typically created sleek, smooth works. A 1967 review in Artforum noted that "Bengston's technique of spray application of lacquer has always appeared fresh, unique, and superb in its variety and complexity." The artist heightened the effect with unusual textures, as in his well-known "Dentos", works in which the aluminum upon which he created imagery was dented in unpredictable patterns.

== Exhibitions ==
Bengston's first solo exhibition was at Ferus Gallery in 1958. His work has been the subject of major solo presentations at the Los Angeles County Museum of Art; the San Francisco Museum of Modern Art; the Contemporary Arts Museum Houston, Texas; and the Honolulu Museum of Art. In 2010 at Samuel Freeman Gallery, Bengston recreated this first solo exhibition, including a scale replica of the Ferus Gallery inside Freeman's space. Bengston's "moon paintings"—first exhibited at James Corcoran Gallery in 1990—were exhibited at Various Small Fires in 2017, after almost three decades out of the public eye. In 2017, Bengston was the focus of the major retrospective California Dreaming: Ed Moses, Billy Al Bengston & Ed Ruscha at the New Britain Museum of American Art in Connecticut. He received grants from the National Endowment for the Arts (1967), the Tamarind Lithography Workshop (1968, 1982, 1987), and the John Simon Guggenheim Memorial Foundation (1975).

== Permanent collections ==
Bengston's work is included in a number of permanent collections including the Centre Georges Pompidou, Paris, the Honolulu Museum of Art, the Art Institute of Chicago, the Los Angeles County Museum of Art, the Museum of Contemporary Art, Los Angeles, the Philadelphia Museum of Art, the Museum of Modern Art, New York, the Solomon R. Guggenheim Museum, New York, the Whitney Museum of American Art, New York, and the San Francisco Museum of Modern Art. His work was also exhibited at the Corcoran Gallery of Art, Washington, D.C. until its closure in 2014.

== Representation ==
Bengston is represented by the Various Small Fires gallery in Los Angeles and had exhibitions/representation in New York with the following galleries: Martha Jackson Gallery (1962), Acquavella Contemporary Art Gallery (1979, 1981, 1983), Renato Danese Gallery (2001), Franklin Parrasch Gallery (2005, 2014, 2016), Andrew Kreps Gallery (2016), and Venus Over Manhattan Gallery (2016).

== Personal life ==
Billy Al Bengston died at the age of 88, on October 8, 2022, at his home in Venice and is survived by his wife of 28 years, Wendy Al, and their daughter, Blue Tica Bengston and grandchildren Billy Agnes and Hugo Ace Du Celliee Muller. During the last few years of his life, he suffered from dementia and was the subject of a Silver Alert in November 2021, but after remembering his phone number was found happily holding court in the lobby of a Marina Del Rey Hotel. In spite of his struggles with dementia, he continued to paint up until his death and had an exhibition of his new work at Various Small Fires in Los Angeles in March 2022.
