= Robert Irwin (artist) =

American installation artist (1928–2023)

Robert W. Irwin
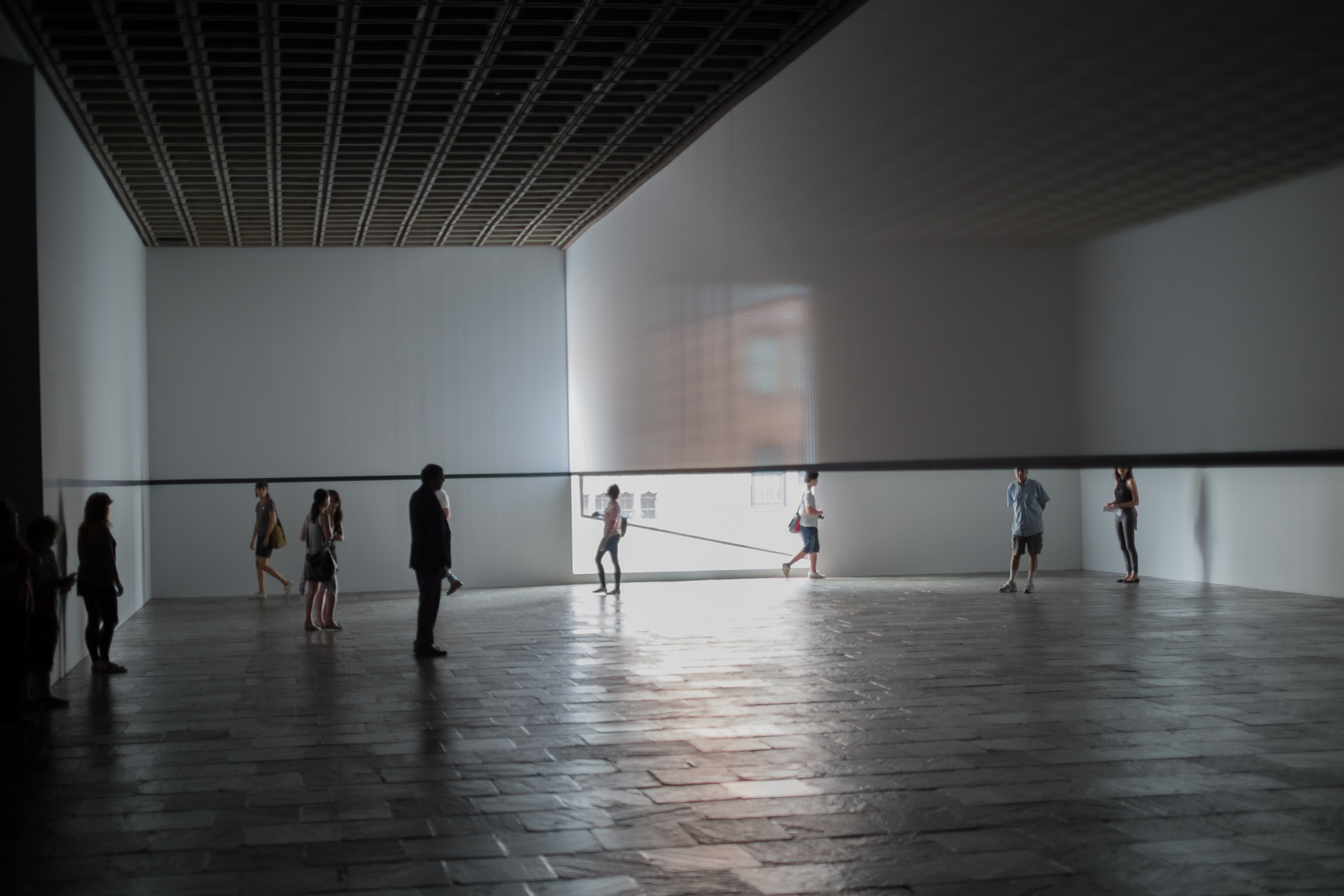
- Scrim Veil—Black Rectangle—Natural Light, Whitney Museum of American Art, New York (1977) – (2013)
- Born: September 12, 1928; Long Beach, California, U.S.
- Died: October 25, 2023 (aged 95); La Jolla, California, U.S.
- Known for: Painting, installation art, site-specific art
- Movement: Light and Space
- Elected: National Academy of Design (2012)

Robert Walter Irwin (September 12, 1928 – October 25, 2023) was an American installation artist who explored perception and the conditional in art, often through site-specific, architectural interventions that alter the physical, sensory and temporal experience of space.

Irwin began his career as a painter in the 1950s, but in the 1960s shifted to installation work, becoming a pioneer whose work helped to define the aesthetics and conceptual issues of the West Coast Light and Space movement. His early works often employed light and veils of scrim to transform gallery and museum spaces, but from 1975 until his death, he also incorporated landscape projects into his practice. Irwin conceived over fifty-five site-specific projects, at institutions including the Getty Center (1992–98), Dia:Beacon (1999–2003), and the Chinati Foundation in Marfa, Texas (2001–16). The Museum of Contemporary Art, Los Angeles mounted the first retrospective of his work in 1993; in 2008, the Museum of Contemporary Art San Diego presented another, spanning fifty years of his career. Irwin received a Guggenheim Fellowship in 1976, a MacArthur Fellowship in March 1984, and was elected as a member of the American Academy of Arts and Letters in 2007. He lived and worked in San Diego, California.

== Beginnings ==
Robert Walter Irwin was born on September 12, 1928, in Long Beach, California, to Overton Ernest Irwin and Goldie née Anderberg. Overton was a gold miner from Colorado who moved to California to work in shipyards. Goldie was a devout Mormon, born in Provo, Utah. Overton became a contractor in the 1920s, but went out of business in the 1930s, when Robert was growing up. Overton later worked for the local department of water and power.

Robert grew up in the Baldwin Hills area of Los Angeles, and graduated from Dorsey High School. After serving in the United States Army from 1946 to 1947, he attended several art institutes: Otis Art Institute in Los Angeles from 1948 to 1950, Jepson Art Institute in 1951, and Chouinard Art Institute in Los Angeles from 1952 to 1954. He spent the next two years living in Europe and North Africa. Between the years 1957–1958, he taught at the Chouinard Art Institute.

== Work ==
In 1977, Robert Irwin wrote the following about himself: "I began as a painter in the middle of nowhere with few questions...My first real question concerned the arbitrariness of my paintings… I used my paintings as a step-by-step process, each new series of works acting in direct response to those questions raised by the previous series. I first questioned the mark as meaning and then even as focus; I then questioned the frame as containment, the edge as the beginning and end of what I see...consider the possibility that nothing ever really transcends its immediate environment...I tried to respond directly to the quality of each situation I was in, not to change it wholesale into a new or ideal environment, but to attend directly to the nature of how it already was. How is it that a space could ever come to be considered empty when it is filled with real and tactile events?" (Robert Irwin, 1977). Irwin's notion of art derived from a series of experiential perceptions. As an abstract, open-minded thinker, he presented experience first as perception or sense. He concluded that a sense of knowing, or ability to identify, helped to clarify perception. For example,

"We know the sky's blueness even before we know it as "blue", let alone as "sky."

Irwin explained later that the conception of an abstract thought occurs in the mind, through the concept of self. Following, the physical form is then recognized, communicating the form to the community. Then, the Objective compound occurs, delineating behavioral norms and artistic norms, becoming identifiable. Then the boundaries and axioms introduce logic and reasoning and decisions can be made: either inductive or deductive. Formalism follows, proving and convincing a decision about the object being perceived. The study done by Irwin suggested that: "…all ideas and values have their roots in experience,… they can be held separate at any point and developed directly on the grounds of function and use, both that they in fact remain relative to the condition of both our subjective and objective being." Irwin's philosophy defined his idea of art as a series of aesthetic inquiries, an opportunity for cultural innovation, a communicative interaction with society, and as compounded historical development.

In his book Seeing Is Forgetting the Name of the Thing One Sees, Lawrence Weschler documents Irwin's process from his early days as a youngster in Southern California to his emergence as a leader in the post-abstraction art world. Weschler describes the mystifying and often enchanting quality of these works in his book's cover notes:

"In May 1980, Robert Irwin returned to Market Street in Venice, California to the block where he had kept a studio until 1970, the year he abandoned studio work altogether. Melinda Wyatt was opening a gallery in the building next door to his former work space and invited Irwin to create an installation."

"He cleaned out the large rectangular room, adjusted the skylights, painted the walls an even white, and then knocked out the wall facing the street, replacing it with a sheer, semi-transparent white scrim. The room seemed to change its aspect with the passing day: people came and sat on the opposite curb, watching, sometimes for hours at time."

"The piece was up for two weeks in one of the more derelict beachfront neighborhoods of Los Angeles: no one so much as laid a hand on it."

Because of the ephemeral or subtle nature of his work, this book became not just an introduction but, for many artists and art students, the primary way that Irwin's work was experienced. He told Jori Finkel of the New York Times in 2007 that people still came up to him at lectures for book autographs. In that article, Michael Govan, the director of LACMA who had previously commissioned Irwin to "design our experience" of Dia:Beacon said he believes the book "has convinced more young people to become artists than the Velvet Underground has created rockers."

=== Painting ===
Irwin's early work began with painting. In 1959, he painted a series of hand-held objects and exhibited for the second time, as an individual exhibitor, at the Ferus Gallery in Los Angeles. The following year, 1960, he was asked to exhibit there again as well as at the Pasadena Art Museum. By this time, he began a continuous series of experiments. In 1962, he began teaching at the University of California, Los Angeles and exhibited at the Ferus Gallery again. That year, he began his line paintings. He exhibited at the Ferus Gallery in 1964 and presented a different study, his dot paintings.

Between 1966 and 1967, he began painting aluminum discs. He was invited back as an individual exhibitor to The Pace Gallery in New York City. In 1968, he began teaching at the University of California, Irvine. For the next two years, he started his work with clear acrylic discs, white convex structures fixed to the wall and illuminated by lamps. In 1970, he began his work on "Columns", a series of clear acrylic columns. In 1972, he began his study on "sightlines" and "places" in the Southwest.

=== Light works ===
Irwin first used fluorescent light in the 1970s. His site-conditioned installation Excursus: Homage to the Square3, a meditation on the painter Josef Albers and his explorations of color relationships, was presented at Dia:Chelsea between 1998 and 2000. It consists of 18 small rooms, divided by walls of tautly stretched scrim; the light in each room, its value depending on the distance from the windows, is enhanced by four white-and-colored double fluorescent bulbs, each hung vertically at the center of each wall. In 2015, it was reinstalled at Dia:Beacon where it was on view through 2017. For a 2015 exhibition at Pace Gallery in New York City, Irwin installed rows of columnar lights, coating the different tubes with colored gels that alter the transmission of light.

His later exhibitions included: Unlights at Kayne Griffin in Los Angeles, January 9 – February 27, 2021 and Light and Space commissioned by Light Art Space (LAS) and displayed at Kraftwerk Berlin from December 5, 2021 to January 30, 2022.

"Irwin's new works are composed from unlit six-foot fluorescent lights mounted to fixtures and installed in vertical rows directly on the wall. The glass tubes are covered in layers of opulently colored translucent gels and thin strips of electrical tape, allowing the reflective surfaces of unlit glass and anodized aluminum to interact with ambient illumination in the surrounding space and produce shifting patterns of shadow and chromatic tonality. Reflecting his recent turn toward the perceptual possibilities of unlit bulbs, Irwin's new body of work expands the range of possibilities for how we experience sensations of rhythm, pulsation, expansion and intensity, while continuing the artist's long-standing interest in registering the immediacy of our own presence in space."

=== Installations ===
From 1968 Irwin focused on the site itself by creating installations in rooms, gardens, parks, museums, and various urban locales. Influenced, in particular, by the paintings of John McLaughlin, Irwin and other Light and Space artists became curious about pushing the boundaries of art and perception, in the 1970s Irwin left studio work to pursue installation art that dealt directly with light and space: the basis of visual perception, in both outdoor and modified interior sites. These installations allowed for an open exploration for artist and viewer of an altered experience created by manipulating the context of environment rather than remaining with the confines of an individual work of art. Other artists involved in the Light and Space movement include John McCracken, James Turrell, Peter Alexander, Larry Bell, Craig Kauffman, Doug Wheeler, and Maria Nordman.

In 1970, the Museum of Modern Art invited Irwin to create an installation. Using the entire project space, Irwin suspended a white scrim 10 feet from the ground and attached shimmering stainless steel wires to the wall. In 1971 the Walker Art Center commissioned the artist to create Untitled (Slant/Light/Volume) for the inaugural exhibition of its Edward Larrabee Barnes-designed building. Suspended between the floor and ceiling, his Full Room Skylight - Scrim V (1972/2022) comprises two sheets of translucent fabric stretched in a “V” shape across two connected galleries; from overhead, the fabric is illuminated by abundant natural light beaming through the skylights, both concealing and revealing the surrounding architecture depending on variables such as brightness, time of day, and the viewer's vantage point. For Soft Wall, a 1974 installation at Pace Gallery in New York City, Irwin simply cleaned and painted a rectangular gallery and hung a thin, translucent white theater scrim eighteen inches in front of one of the long walls, creating the effect of an empty room in which one wall seemed permanently out of focus.

Light and Space III (2008) at the Indianapolis Museum of Art in 2022

A permanent wall installation in the entrance corridor of the Allen Memorial Art Museum, the dimensions of Untitled (1980) exactly repeat those of the deep-set windows just opposite. In the early 1980s, Irwin was invited to participate as a collaborating artist in designs for the rejuvenation and improvement of the Miami International Airport. In 1997 he transformed a room that overlooks the Pacific at the La Jolla branch of the Museum of Contemporary Art San Diego. To celebrate its 125th anniversary, the Indianapolis Museum of Art commissioned Irwin to create Light and Space III (2008), thereby becoming the first U.S. museum to have a permanent indoor installation of the artist. For the piece, Irwin arranged fluorescent light bulbs in an irregular grid pattern across the walls surrounding the escalators, with a veil of scrim framing each side; as museum visitors go up and down between floors, they move through the piece. Trifecta (Joe's Bar & Grill), a three-story permanent light installation at Swiss Re's corporate headquarters in Fort Wayne, Indiana, was inaugurated in 2012.

In late 2013, a 33-foot-tall acrylic column by Irwin was unveiled at the San Diego Federal Courthouse, where the artist worked with his longtime friends and collaborators, architect Martin Poirer and landscape architect Andrew Spurlock, on the courthouse's outdoor plaza. The three-story-tall acrylic column, built decades ago but never given a proper home due to a series of unforeseen circumstances, refracts light and cast colors as the sun moves through the lobby. The fabrication of the columns and the technical issues related to the material, were all executed by Jack Brogan, a central character in the evolution of the techniques in the Light and Space Movement. The challenge and technique of polishing the columns to the required transparency was invented by Brogan and remains a high water mark in the field.

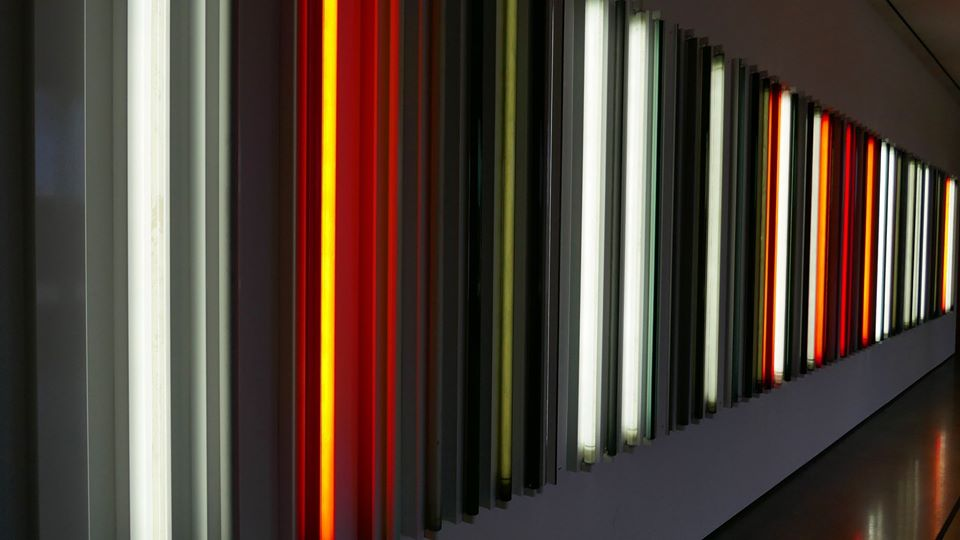
Artist Robert Irwin's linear configuration is composed of 66 fluorescent tubes. The work stretches to a length of approximately 36 feet and can be experienced both from within and beyond the gallery walls.

For the Los Angeles County Museum of Art (LACMA), Irwin created an outdoor installation of primal palm trees (Primal Palm Garden, 2008–2010) as well as an indoor 36-foot-long fluorescent light sculpture, Miracle Mile (2013), which glows behind them 24 hours a day.

After having been working and reworking his ideas to create a giant installation for the Chinati Foundation since the early 2000s, Irwin's installation in Marfa, Texas — a U-shape construction about 10,000 square feet — began in early 2015 and be completed and opened to the public in 2016. The installation, situated at the building that had housed the former Army barracks' hospital, will be the first major installation added to the Chinati Foundation since 2004 as well as the first freestanding structure designed by Irwin that is devoted solely to his work.

Other installations by Irwin included; Fractured Light – Partial Scrim – Eye Level at the Museum of Modern Art, New York (1970–1971); Black Line Room Division + Extended Forms at the Whitney Museum, New York (1977); 48 Shadow Planes at the Old Post Office Pavilion, Washington, D.C. (1983); Ascending at the Musee d' Art Moderne de Ville, Paris, France (1994); and Double Diamond at the Musée d'Art Contemporain, Lyon, France (1997–1998).

=== Landscape projects ===
Irwin moved on to landscape projects after developing a stylistic move towards experiential space, projecting what he learned about line, color, and most of all, light onto the built environment. From 1975 forward, Irwin conceived of fifty-five site projects. 9 Spaces 9 Trees (1980–3) originally was commissioned in 1980 for the rooftop of the Public Safety Building by the Seattle Arts Commission; it was re-imagined in 2007 and situated on campus at the University of Washington. Irwin's Filigreed Line (1979) made for Wellesley College in Massachusetts, consists of a stainless steel line, running along a ridge of grass near a lake, in which a pattern of leaflike forms is cut. His 1983 work Two Running Violet V Forms, two crossing blue-violet, plastic coated wire fences fixed with high poles, is featured as part of the Stuart Collection of public artwork on the campus of the University of California, San Diego. For Sentinel Plaza (1990) in the Pasadena Civic Center District, Irwin chose small desert plants and cacti. He later consulted on the master plan for Dia:Beacon, creating, in particular, the design and landscaping of the outdoor spaces, and the entrance building and the window design.

Irwin later designed and developed the Central Garden at the Getty Center in Los Angeles, built in 1997. In the Central Garden, Irwin's concept of integrating experiential relationships to the built environment is abundantly clear. Those experiential elements fill the space. This project is widely praised for its design and flow. The 134,000-square-foot (12,400 m^{2}) design features a natural ravine and tree-lined walkway that leads the visitor through an experience of sights, sounds, and scents. He selected everything in the garden to accentuate the interplay of light, color, and reflection. Planning began in 1992, as a key part of the Getty Center project. Since the Center opened in 1997, the Central Garden has evolved as its plants have grown. Irwin's statement, "Always changing, never twice the same," is carved into the plaza floor, reminding visitors of the ever-changing nature of this living work of art. To the artist's dismay, a 1950s Fernand Léger sculpture was placed on the garden's plaza.

Irwin later completed the second phase of the installation of a primordial Palm Garden at the Los Angeles County Museum of Art which began in 2007. The Palm Garden is arranged in a "T" shape with the east–west axis running between and around, both the Broad Contemporary Art Museum and the Resnick Pavilion. The north–south axis terminates with a grid of date palms serving as a counterpoint to artist Chris Burden's Urban Light installation. Irwin was long intrigued with how palm trees capture and reflect Southern California light; designing the Palm Garden provided Irwin with an opportunity to work with both the phenomenal and cultural perceptions of palms. Individual species of palms are planted in Cor-Ten boxes, modern and formalized versions of common wood nursery boxes. The sculptural containers make reference to the pedestal bases traditionally signifying art objects. Irwin's use of palm trees considers the ubiquitous and iconic connection between the palm tree and images of Los Angeles.

== Exhibitions ==
Irwin first exhibited paintings at the Los Angeles County Museum of Art in 1957. The exhibit was called "Artists of Los Angeles and Vicinity." The same year, he participated in the 57th Annual Exhibition of the Whitney Museum of American Art in New York. That same year, he had his first individual exhibition at the Felix Landau Gallery in Los Angeles.

In 1965, he participated in an exhibition called The Responsive Eye at the Museum of Modern Art in New York and at another called XIII in Bienal de São Paulo, Brazil. In 1966, he exhibited both as an individual and with Kenneth Price at the Los Angeles County Museum of Art and as an individual exhibitor later at The Pace Gallery in New York City. In 1969, Irwin exhibited with Doug Wheeler at the Fort Worth Art Center in Fort Worth, Texas. In 1970, he first exhibited scrim "volumes" at the Museum of Modern Art in New York. For the next five years, he exhibited individually at the following locations: the Pace Gallery in New York City, the Walker Art Center in Minneapolis, the Minuzo and Ace Galleries in Los Angeles, the Fogg Art Museum on the Harvard University Campus in Cambridge, Massachusetts, Wright State University in Dayton, Ohio, the University of California at Santa Barbara, Fort Worth Art Center, and Palomar College in San Marcos, California. He participated in several joint exhibitions: "Transparency, Reflection, Light, Space: Four Artists" at the UCLA Art Gallery in Los Angeles and "Some Recent American Art" at the Museum of Modern Art exhibition for Australia. He also exhibited internationally: "Kompas IV" at Stedelijk Museum in Eindhoven, with other artists (Larry Bell and Doug Wheeler), at the Tate Gallery in London, and Documenta in Kassel in Germany.

In 1993, the Museum of Contemporary Art, Los Angeles mounted the first comprehensive retrospective of Irwin's career; the exhibition later traveled to the Kölnischer Kunstverein, the Musée d'Art Moderne de la Ville de Paris, and the Museo Nacional Centro de Arte Reina Sofía. In 2008, the Museum of Contemporary Art San Diego presented another comprehensive retrospective spanning fifty years of Irwin's career.

== Recognition ==
Irwin was awarded a MacArthur Fellowship in 1984, making him the first artist to receive the five-year fellowship, which lasted until 1989. He was also the recipient of a John Simon Guggenheim Fellowship (1976), the Chaloner award, the James D. Phelan award (1954), and the Thomas Jefferson Foundation medal in architecture awarded by the University of Virginia School of Architecture (2009). He held Honorary Doctorates from the San Francisco Art Institute (1978) and the Otis College of Art and Design (1992). Irwin was elected as a member of the American Academy of Arts and Letters in 2007. That same year he had a residency at the Museum of Contemporary Art San Diego.

== Collections ==
Irwin's work is held in more than 30 public collections worldwide, including the Centre Georges Pompidou, Paris; the J. Paul Getty Museum, Los Angeles; the Los Angeles County Museum of Art; the Museum of Contemporary Art, Los Angeles; the Museum of Contemporary Art, Chicago; Museum of Contemporary Art San Diego; the Walker Art Center, Minneapolis; Hirshhorn Museum and Sculpture Garden, Smithsonian Institution, Washington, D.C.; Museo Nacional Centro de Arte Reina Sofia, Madrid, Spain; the Museum of Modern Art, New York; the Metropolitan Museum of Art, New York; Solomon R. Guggenheim Museum, New York; the Whitney Museum of American Art, New York; the Albright-Knox Art Gallery, Buffalo; and the Dia Art Foundation, New York.

== Personal life and death ==
Between 1999 and 2003 Irwin lived in Beacon, New York. Irwin died of heart failure in La Jolla, California, on October 25, 2023, at the age of 95.

== See also ==
- Nine Spaces Nine Trees, University of Washington, Seattle, Washington
