= Craig Kauffman =

American painter (1932–2010)

- Born: March 31, 1932; Los Angeles, California, U.S.
- Died: May 9, 2010 (aged 78); Angeles City, Philippines
- Known for: Sculpture, painting
- Movement: Minimalism, Vacuum Forms, Light and Space

Craig Kauffman (March 31, 1932 – May 9, 2010) was an artist who has exhibited since 1951. Kauffman's primarily abstract paintings and wall relief sculptures are included in over 20 museum collections, including the Museum of Modern Art, the Whitney Museum of American Art, the Tate Modern, the Louisiana Museum of Modern Art, the Art Institute of Chicago, the Los Angeles County Museum of Art, Seattle Art Museum, and the Museum of Contemporary Art, Los Angeles.

== Life and career ==
Kauffman first exhibited at the Felix Landau Gallery in Los Angeles, and was included in other Los Angeles group exhibits during the early 1950s. He was a member of the original group of artists at the Ferus Gallery (founded in 1957 by Edward Kienholz and Walter Hopps), and had a one-person show at that gallery in 1958. According to critic and historian Peter Plagens, the 1958 paintings were:

... Abstract Expressionist but contain the first evidence of a Los Angeles sensibility: Tell Tale Heart (1958) is structured superficially along the lines of a second-generation New York painting, but it reveals the original stem-and-bulb shapes that Kauffman was later to translate into Plexiglas. The 'clean' Abstract Expressionist work of Craig Kauffman could be the point at which Los Angeles art decided to live on its own life-terms, instead of those handed down from Paris, New York, or even San Francisco.

In several series of wall relief sculptures made between 1964 and 1970, Kauffman pioneered the use of acrylic plastic as a support for painting. Craig Kauffman's wall relief sculptures are his most well known work. Throughout his career, Kauffman has explored the use of unorthodox materials. Art historian Susan C. Larsen notes:

Kauffman's work has maintained its radiant color and its emphasis on certain sensuous physical properties of his materials.

Through his integration of sprayed color and shape, Kauffman achieved the visual presence of his vacuum formed acrylic wall reliefs. Works from the late 1960s have been described by former Whitney museum curator Richard Armstrong as:

Glossy and symmetrical, the work's visually wet surface engenders anatomical, sometimes overtly sexual, comparisons.

Curators and historians now regard Kauffman's works from the late 1960s in relation to the art movement known as Minimalism. Susan L. Jenkins wrote:

... his works, as well as others associated with the L.A. Look, can nevertheless be thought of as possessing a relatively Minimalist sensibility. Like Judd's 'specific objects', Kauffman's vacuum-formed plastic works exist in a space between painting and sculpture.

Kauffman continued painting after that period, and his works have been included in exhibitions such as Time and Place: Los Angeles 1957-1968, at the Moderna Museet in Stockholm in 2008, Los Angeles 1955-1985: A Birth of an Artistic Capital at the Centre Georges Pompidou in Paris, and A Minimal Future? Art as Object 1958-1968, The Museum of Contemporary Art, Los Angeles, 2004.
