= Eric Orr =

American sculptor (1939–1998)

- Born: December 8, 1939; Covington, Kentucky, US
- Died: November 13, 1998 (aged 58); Venice Beach, Los Angeles, California, US
- Known for: Sculpture, Installation, Performance, and Painting
- Notable work: Zero Mass, Sunrise, Blood Shadow, Electrum, Prime Matter
- Movement: Minimal Art, Installation Art, Geometric abstraction, Performance
- Patrons: Peggy Guggenheim, Giuseppe Panza, Stanley Grinstein & Elyse Grinstein

Eric Orr (1939–1998) was an American artist who lived and worked in Venice, California from 1965 to 1998. Before moving to Los Angeles in 1965, Orr was a civil rights worker in Mississippi. A key figure of the Light and Space movement, Orr developed alongside Southern California conceptual art and created perceptual-based installations commonly associated with Light and Space art. Orr's work spanned a variety of artistic practices (including installation art, sculpture, painting, and performance art that challenged the definition of art making. Orr's work incorporated a broad range of cultural references, including space icons found in ancient religions and cultures, Egyptian symbolism, and Buddhist spiritualism.

Orr participated in a number of international exhibitions during his life, including documenta VII (1982), the Sydney Biennale (1986), and the Venice Biennale (1986). His work can be found in many public and private collections, including the Los Angeles County Museum of Art; the Whitney Museum of American Art, New York; the Solomon R. Guggenheim Museum, New York; the San Francisco Museum of Modern Art; and the Centre Pompidou, Paris; Orr died in Venice, California, in 1998." His archives are available at The Getty Research Institute.

== Critical analysis ==
In both his installations, sculpture and paintings, Eric Orr worked with elemental qualities of natural materials, e.g. stone, metal, water, and fire, gold leaf, lead, blood, human skull, and AM/FM radio parts. Orr worked with the "phenomenological exploration of perception." His body of work also includes monochromatic paintings, and large scale fountains (with water & fire). His work was influenced by a religio-philosophical conceptualization of space icons found in ancient religions and cultures, such as Egyptian symbolism and Buddhist Spiritualism. Orr is associated with Light and Space, a group of mostly West Coast artists whose work is primarily concerned with perceptual experience stemming from the viewer's interaction with their work. "The space itself changes you, instead of an object." This group also includes, among others, artists James Turrell, Dewain Valentine, Peter Alexander, Robert Irwin, and Ron Cooper.

"(Orr) always pursued a phenomenological exploration of perception, pushing retinal responses to the limit through ingenious installations or through paintings that blur space via complex relationships of color and gesture...mystical shaman, the alchemical philosopher, whose preoccupations with ritual and the properties of space-time and negative space. . ."

== 1960s synopsis ==
In 1964, Orr exhibited his first work, Colt 45, a chair set in front of an automatic pistol mounted on a stand at eye level for the seated viewer. "Colt.45...working against the triviality of the exhibited object, it opposed the momentous face of bodily death and was a declaration of war against the viewers' expectation.... It announced Orr's feeling that the overwhelming plethora of art objects amassed, cataloged, and disseminated in our culture had come to imprison the living artist."

His studies began at the University of Cincinnati and continued to the New School of Social Research, University of California at Berkeley, University of Mexico, New School for Social Research, École de Paraphysiques-Paris. After "terminating" his formal education in 1965, Orr moved to Venice, CA and worked as Mark di Suvero's assistant. "In 1968, he participated in experiments in hypnosis and passed out 10,000 bags of fresh air in downtown Los Angeles. He made dry ice sculptures with Judy Chicago and Lloyd Hamrol (artist), and also created a seminal work called Wall Shadow, and Zero Mass in 1969."

== 1970s and 1980s synopsis ==
In the 1970s, Orr continued his installation and performance works. Giuseppe Panza acquired his immersive installation work Zero Mass. Orr continued working with philosophy, science, and technology through works: Sound Tunnel (1969) and The Sound The Shape of Pear (1970). Orr's piece Sunrise (1976), installed at Cirrus Gallery, was a continuation of his phenomenological investigations in Zero Mass. Sunrise "began to knit together the scientific and Egyptian strands, introducing silence, alongside space and light, as a third material. A room nine by nine by eighteen feet was built inside a gallery...sheathed with sheets of lead- which by screening out most radiation-created, inside, a partial cosmic-ray voice.... A ceiling channel at one end of the room extended through the rooftop of the outer building to a tracking device on the roof that followed the sun from dawn to dusk and reflected it, through the channel, onto the back interior wall of the lead-sheathed room.... Above all the 'lead box,' was a laboratory for certain types of exploration. Orr reconstructed it in his studio on the Venice beachfront, where it remained for several years.... Awareness of one's body, in that black silence, became overpoweringly absorbing while, at the same time, the sense of one's material boundaries receded."

He began to develop "flat rectangular objects to hang on walls. Some of them are clearly sculptures; others combine the genre characteristics of sculpture and painting...(his wall objects) involved an attempt to combine artwork with the power of object by merging inner powers of materials with their outer visual properties."

From the 1970s onward, Orr created a diverse body of atmospheric monochrome paintings using airbrushing and oil paint, wall-mounted sculptures, and public artworks which incorporated a variety of elements including fire, water, gold, volcanic ash, meteorite dust, and his own blood."

In 1981, he installed Silence and Ion Wind in the Hammer wing at the Los Angeles County Museum of Art. In 1982, Orr's installation Double Vision was part of Documenta 7. Silence and the Ion Wind "was a kind of architectural-iconic allegory of the alchemical process, as one walked from leaden wall to golden room, from darkness to light, from speech to silence." Orr continued working on his wall objects, working with monochromatic color fields, working from both horizon, and void. In 1986 Orr exhibited at the Venice Biennale and with the Sydney Biennial.

== 1990s synopsis ==
In 1990, Orr produced an artist book Zero Mass in conjunction with a show at the Anders Tornberg Gallery, Sweden. This book included work of Orr's lifelong friend and collaborator James Lee Byars, and writing from Thomas McEvilley. Zero Mass is a comprehensive catalog of the artists' work. "The book itself has a blued steel spine connected by linen hinges to blued steel front and rear covers. This is accompanied by a James Lee Byars multiple: The Sphere of Generosity-a handmade fired ceramic sphere. These are each housed in a molded Styrofoam box, which is in turn inside a printed cardboard sleeve."

Electrum was another work that Orr produced in the '90s. Electrum is a large scale Tesla coil installed at Alan Gibbs' installation collection, Gibbs Farm in New Zealand.
