= Gibbs Farm =

Sculpture park in New Zealand

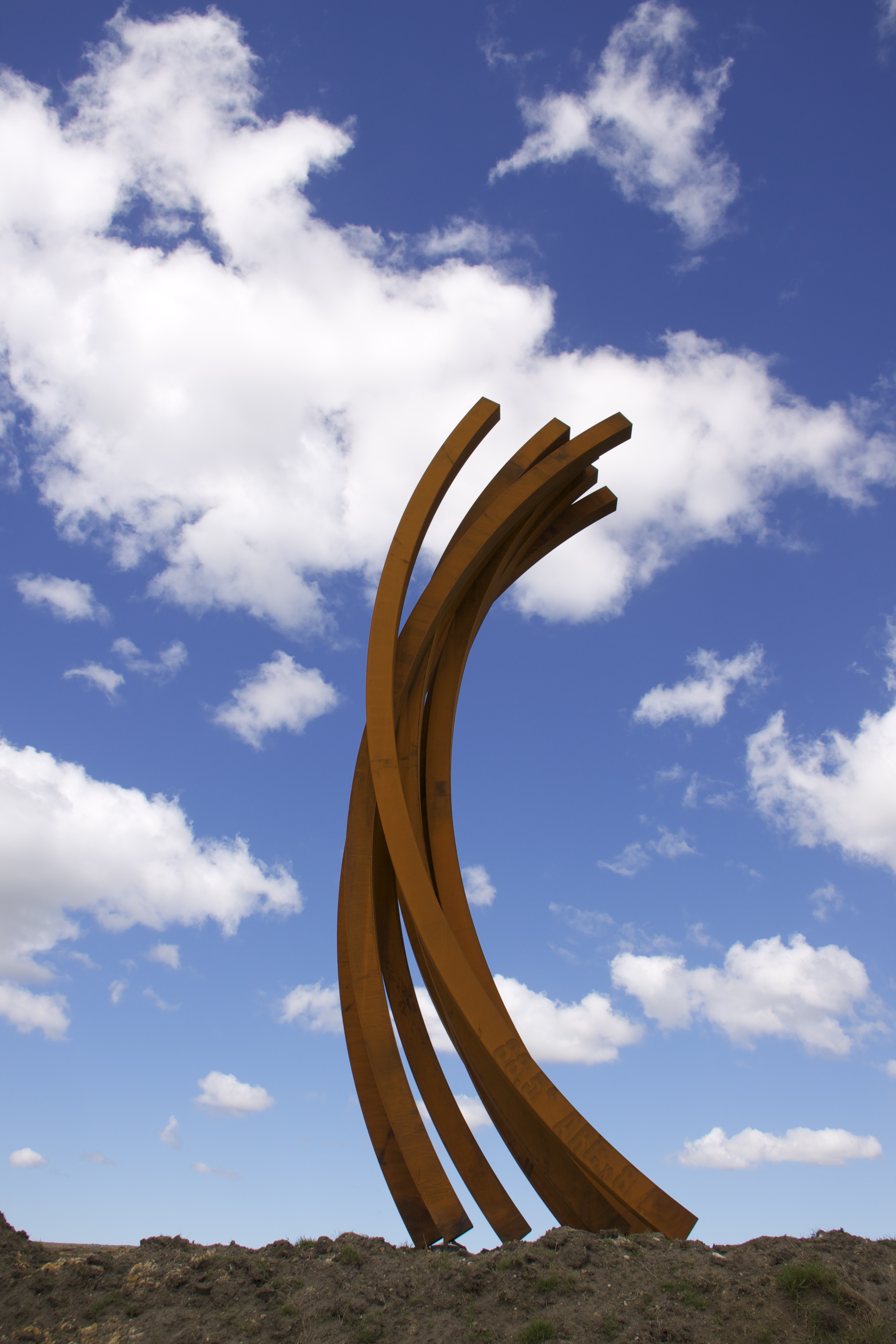
- 88.5° ARC x 8' by Bernar Venet
- Interactive map of Gibbs Farm
- Type: private open-air sculpture park
- Location: Kaipara Harbour, New Zealand
- Nearest city: Auckland
- Area: 990 acres (400 ha)
- Created: 1991
- Operator: Alan Gibbs

Gibbs Farm is an open-air sculpture park located in Kaipara Harbour, 47 kilometres (29 mi) north of Auckland, New Zealand. It contains the largest collection of large-scale outdoor sculptures in New Zealand. It is the private art collection of New Zealand businessman Alan Gibbs; however, it is open to the public on select days throughout the year, usually once per month, on a bookings-essential basis.

== Background ==
After purchasing the 400 hectares (990 acres) of land for "The Farm" in 1991, Gibbs has collected major artworks by many artists from New Zealand and overseas. Much of the artwork is commissioned and, as such, incorporates elements of the landscape into the artwork. The farm also includes several exotic animals such as emus and giraffes, a garage where visitors can glimpse the Gibbs Aquada through the window, and a full-scale wild west town complete with a saloon (in the installation called Grief). Grief was built through the inspiration of Gibbs' architect son-in-law, Noel Lane, who now cares for the property with Gibbs' daughter Amanda. The town is on a private area of the farm and is not open to the public.

The sculpture Electrum (for Len Lye), by Eric Orr, is the world's largest Tesla coil (11.6 metres or 38 feet tall) and numerous artworks are large enough to be seen from satellite imagery at high magnification.

Gibbs is a major sponsor of ACT New Zealand, and most years, the party holds its annual conference at the Gibbs Farm.

== Artworks ==
Year	Artwork	Artist	Coordinates (if visible in satellite imagery)
1987	Two Rectangles, Vertical Gyratory Up (V)	George Rickey	
1990/1995	Column of Four SquaresEccentric Gyratory (III)	George Rickey	
1992	Kaipara Strata	Chris Booth	
1994	Sea/Sky Kaipara	Graham Bennett	
1994	Untitled (Red Square/Black Square)	Richard Thompson	
1994	Horizons	Neil Dawson	36°31′33.6″S 174°26′08.4″E
1996	Red Cloud Confrontation in Landscape	Leon van den Eijkel	36°31′27.9″S 174°26′08.7″E
1996	Light Column/Cabbage Tree	Bill Culbert	
1996	Te Hemara	Ralph Hotere	
1996	Kaipara Waka	Russell Moses	
1996/1997	Rakaia	Peter Nicholls	
1997	Electrum (for Len Lye)	Eric Orr/Greg Leyh	
1997	Pyramid (Keystone NZ)	Sol LeWitt	
1999	The Mermaid	Marijke de Goey	36°31′15.91″S 174°26′26.92″E
1999/2001	Te Tuhirangi Contour	Richard Serra	36°31′23.3″S 174°26′43.22″E
1999/2001	Green and White Fence	Daniel Buren	
2003	Wind Wand	Len Lye	
???	Grief	???	36°31′38.1″S 174°25′48.3″E
2005	Arches	Andy Goldsworthy	36°31′16.16″S 174°25′40.65″E
2005	Easy K	Kenneth Snelson	
2006	Floating Island of Immortals	Zhan Wang	
2008	Mud Opera	Tony Oursler	
2008	Saddleblaze	Peter Roche	
2009	Dismemberment, Site 1	Anish Kapoor	36°31′22.93″S 174°25′55.17″E
2011/2012	Giraffe	Jeff Thomson	
2012	88.5° ARC x 8	Bernar Venet	36°31′07.5″S 174°26′15.0″E
2013	A Fold in the Field	Maya Lin	36°30′51.4″S 174°26′11.3″E
2014	Tango Dancers	Marijke de Goey	
2017	Jacob's Ladder	Gerry Judah	

=== Photos of artwork ===
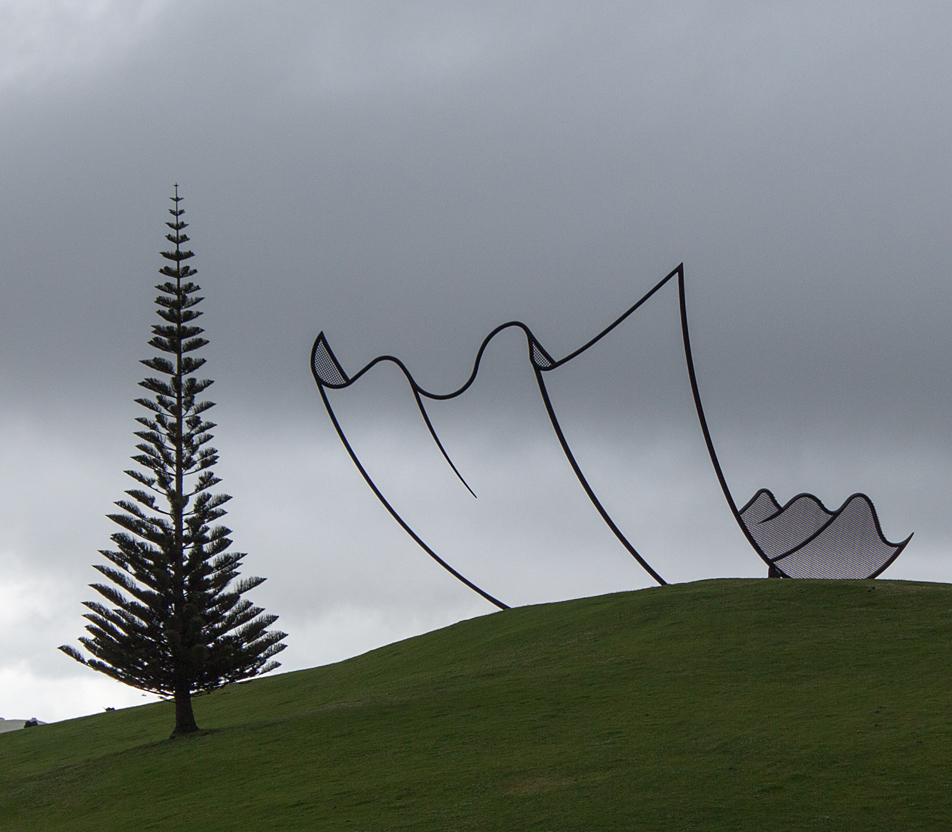
Horizons by Neil Dawson

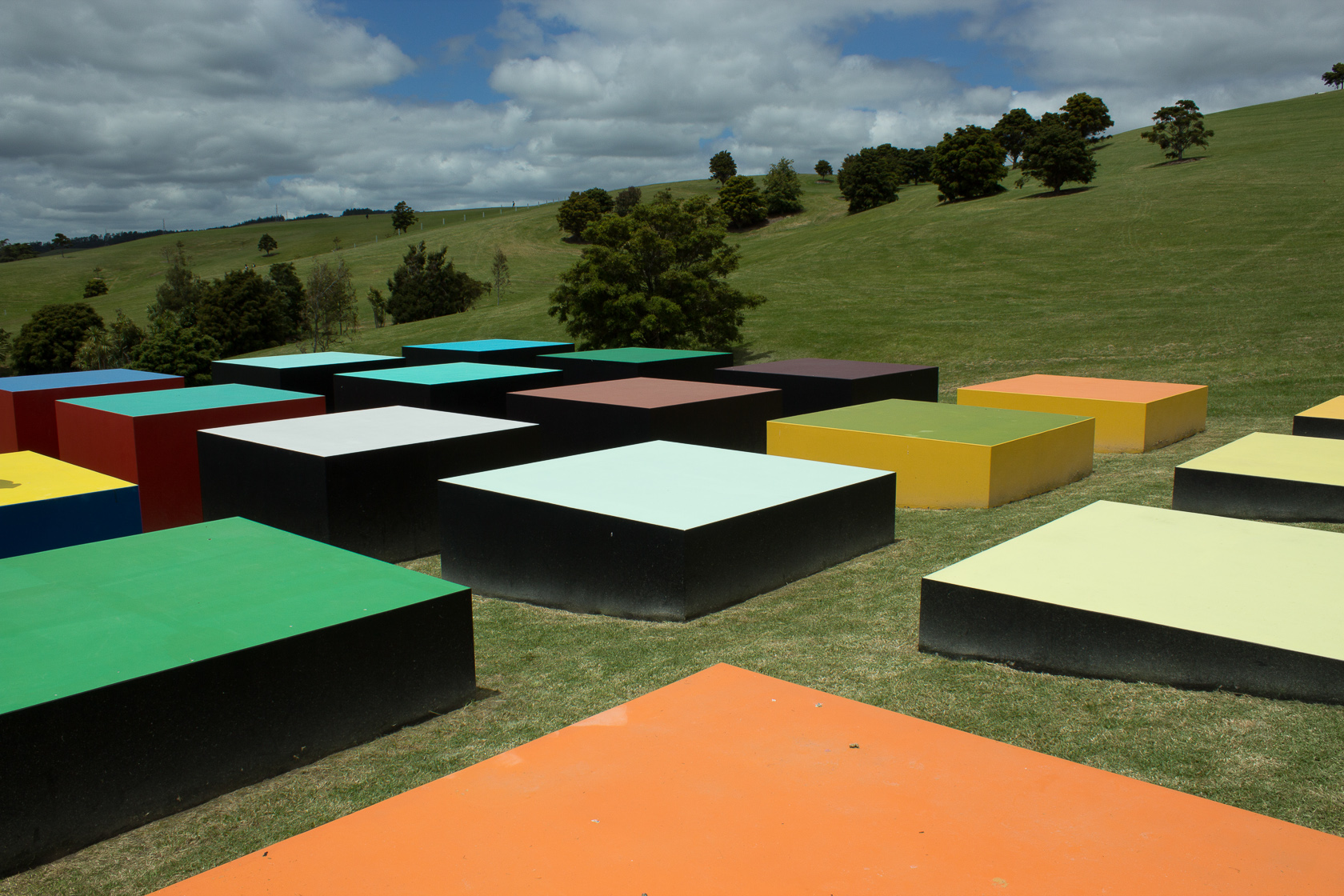
Red Cloud Confrontation in Landscape by Leon van den Eijkel

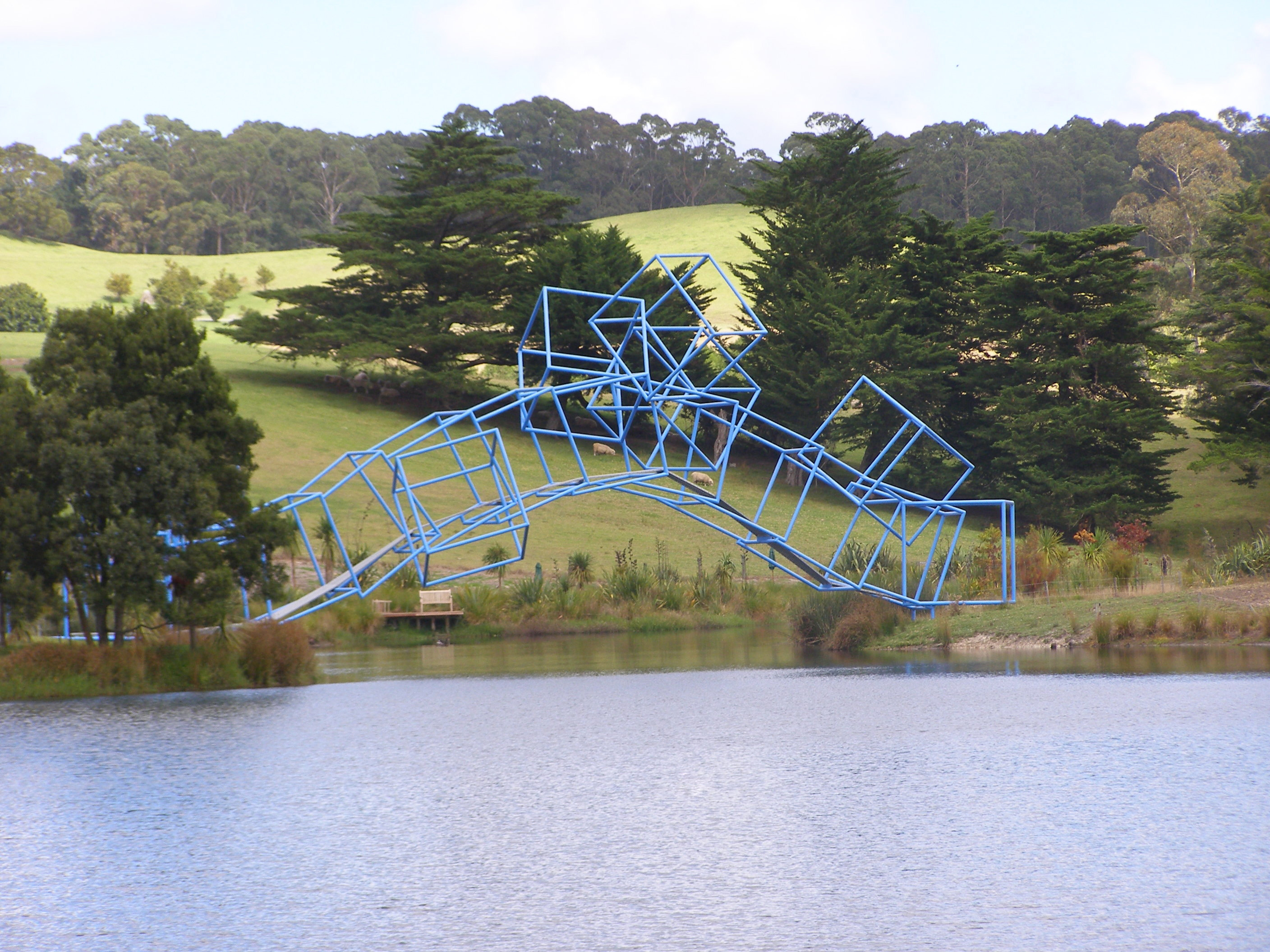
The Mermaid by Marijke de Goey

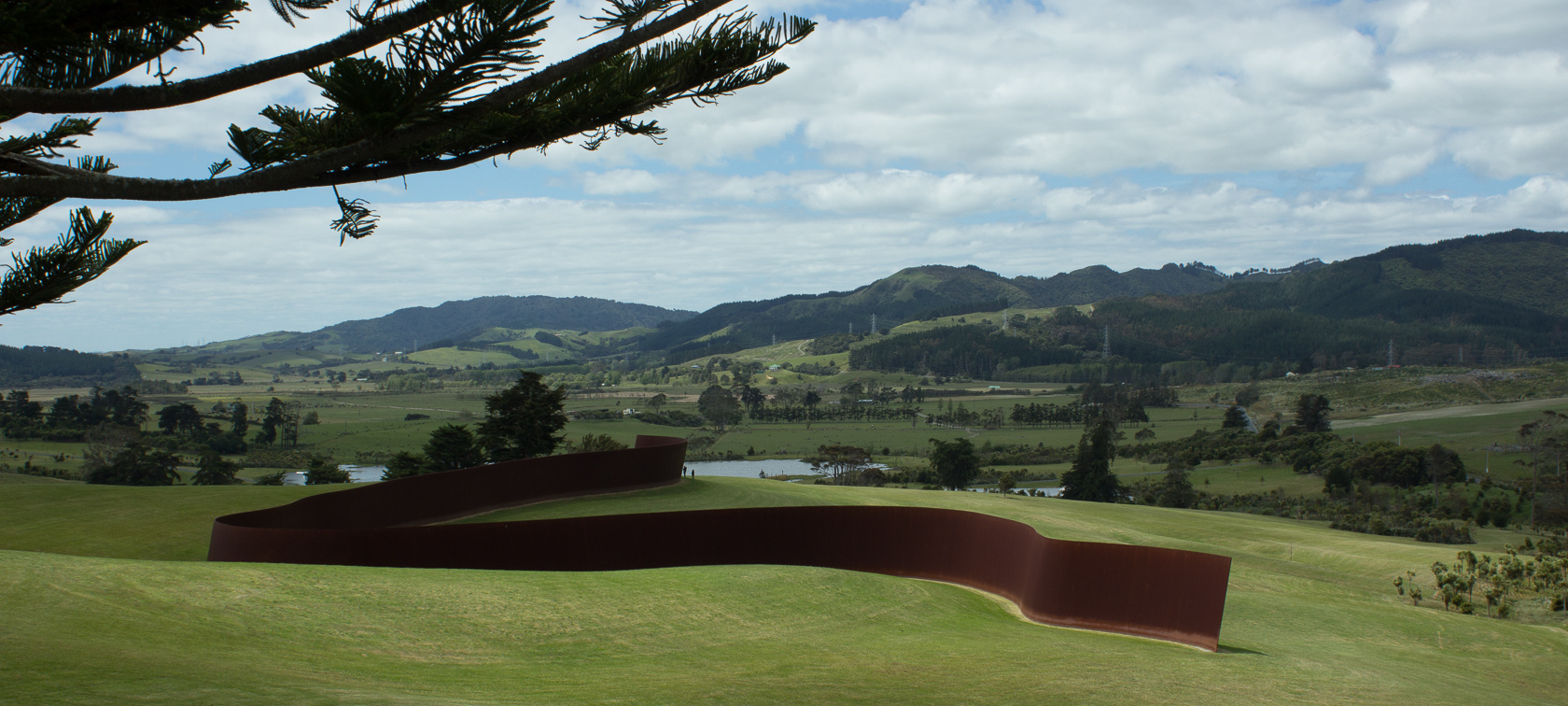
Te Tuhirangi Contour by Richard Serra

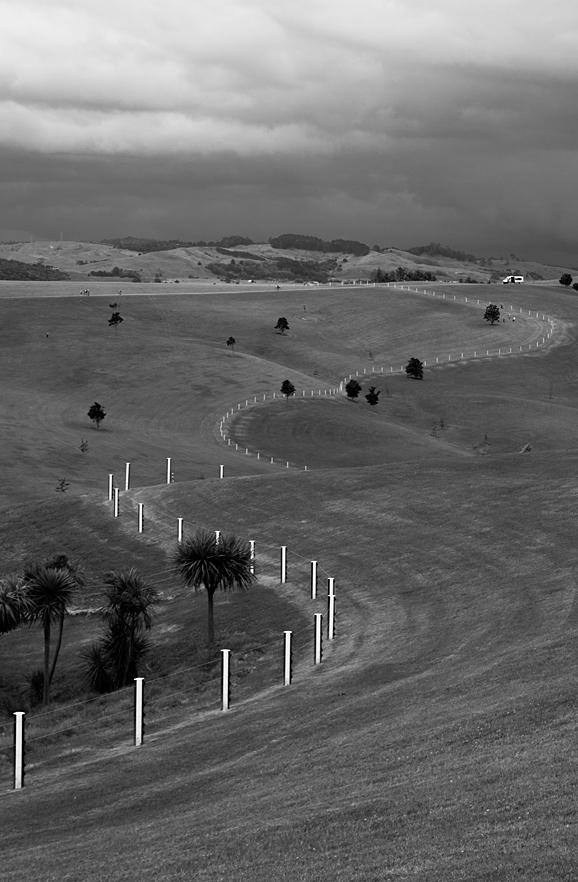
Green and White Fence by Daniel Buren

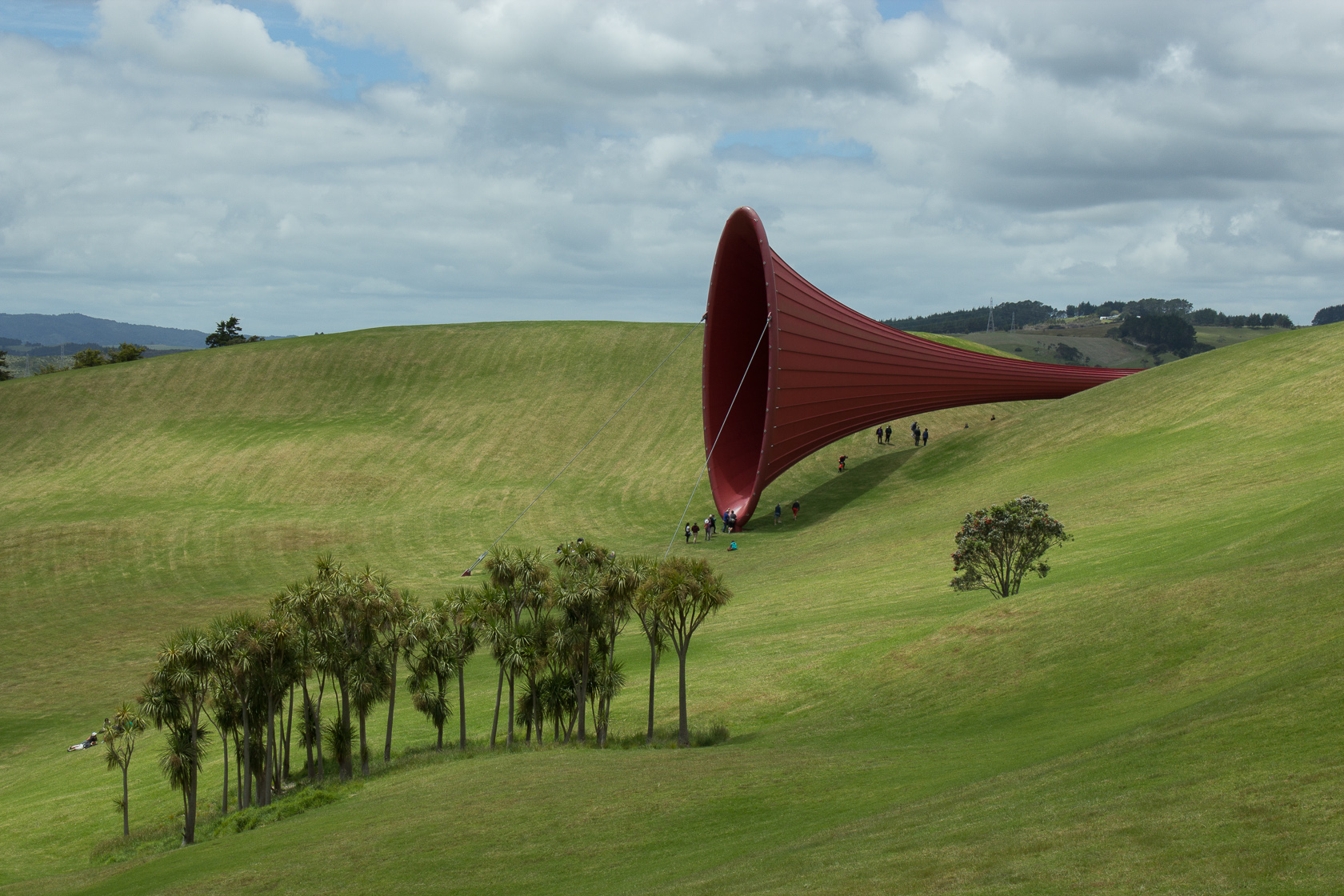
Dismemberment, Site 1 by Anish Kapoor

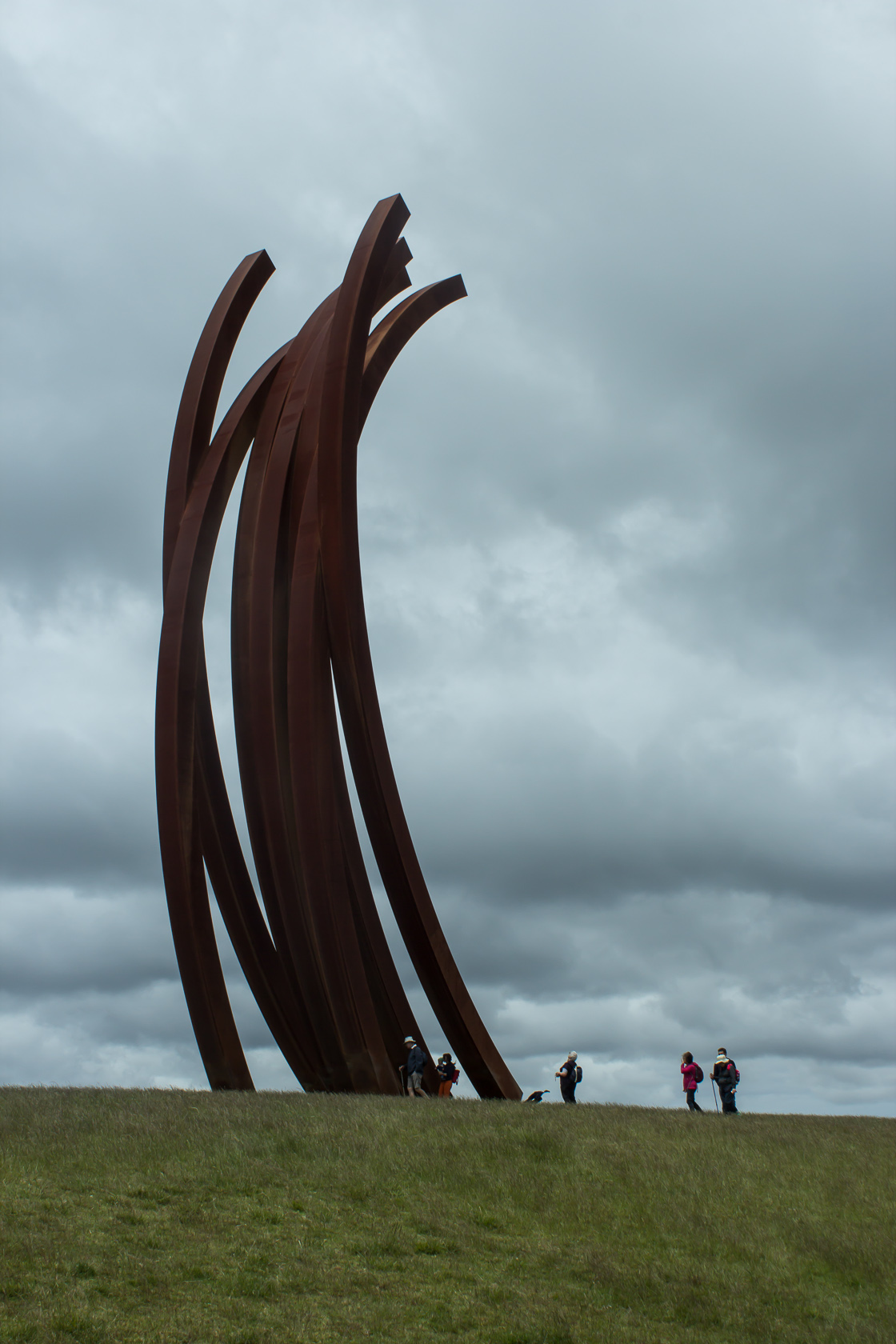
88.5° ARC x 8 by Bernar Venet

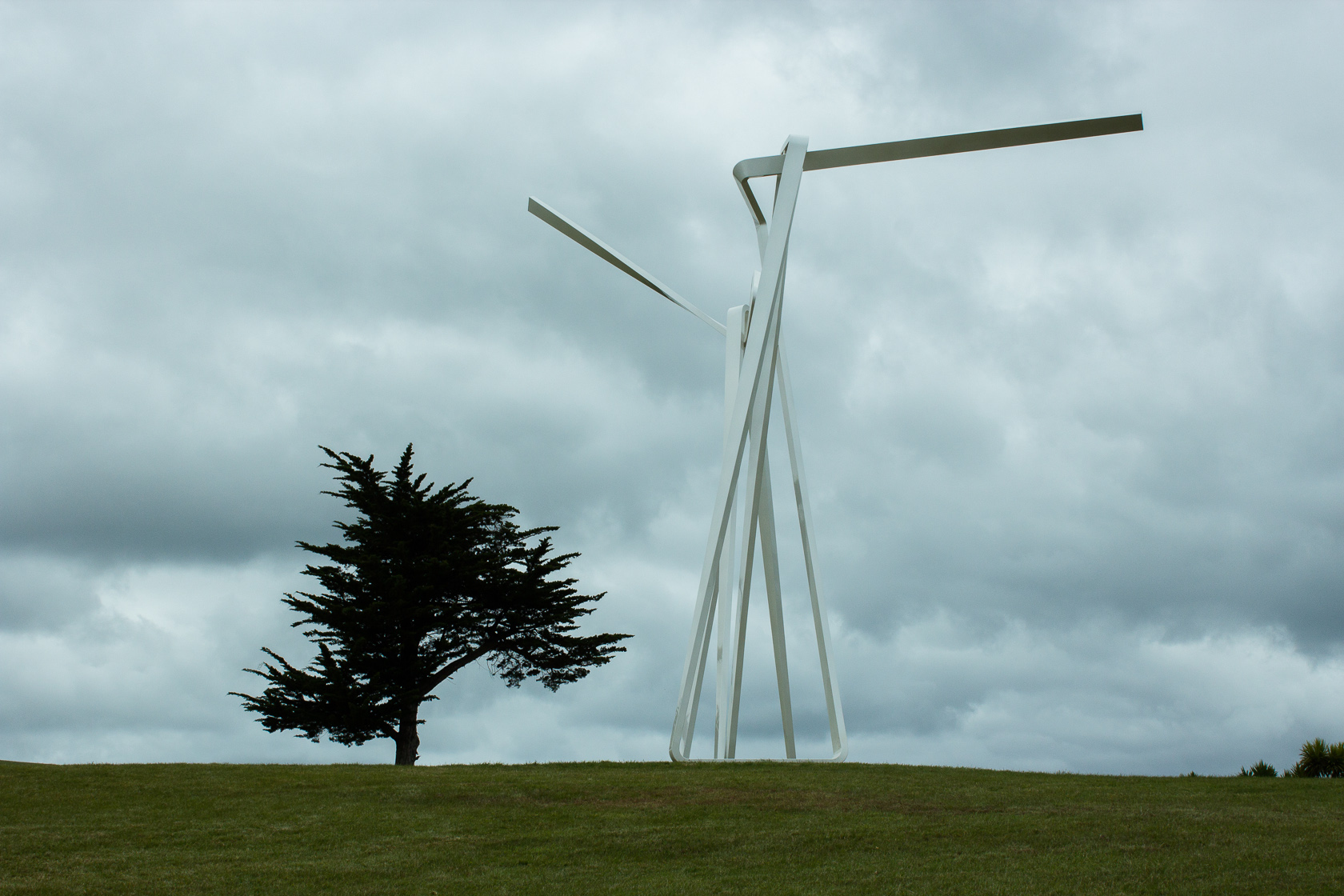
Tango Dancers by Marijke de Goey

== See also ==
- List of sculpture parks
