= Electrum (disambiguation) =

Electrum is an alloy.

Electrum may also refer to:

- Electrum (journal), published by the Department of Ancient History of Jagiellonian University
- Electrum (sculpture), an outdoor sculpture in Auckland, New Zealand
- Electrum (software), a free non-custodial cryptocurrency wallet
- Electrum, the original name given to positronium by the first physicist to predict its existence
- Electrum, a Latin name for amber
- The Electrum Group, an investment management company led by Thomas Kaplan
