= Tesla coil =

Electrical resonant transformer circuit invented by Nikola Tesla

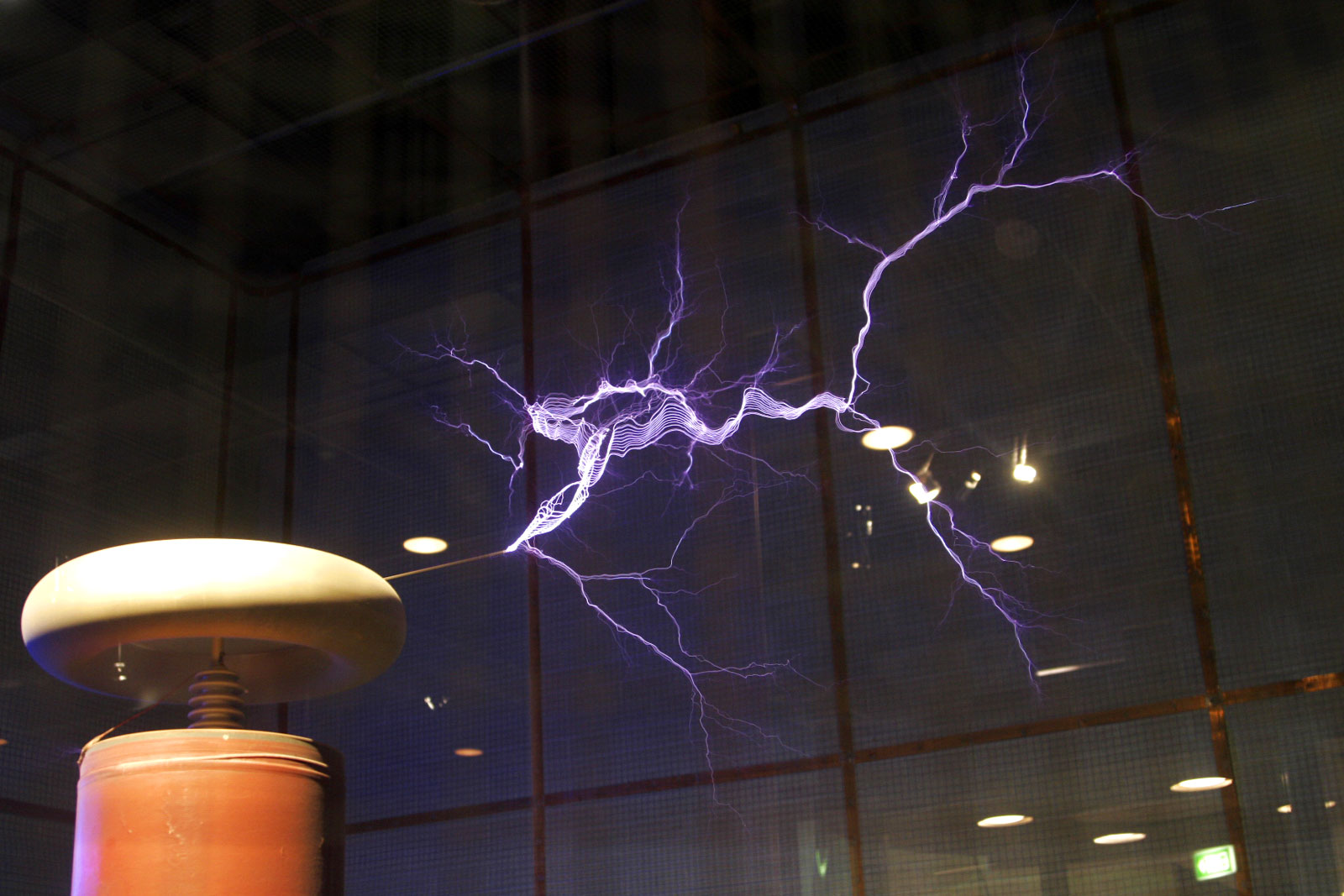
- Tesla coil at Questacon, the National Science and Technology center in Canberra, Australia
- Component type: Resonant transformer
- Working principle: Resonance; Electromagnetic induction
- Inventor: Nikola Tesla (1891)

A Tesla coil is an electrical resonant transformer device designed by inventor Nikola Tesla in 1891. It is used to produce high voltage, low current, high frequency alternating current. Tesla experimented with a number of different configurations consisting of two, or sometimes three, coupled resonant electric circuits.

Tesla used these devices to conduct innovative experiments in electrical lighting, phosphorescence, X-ray generation, high-frequency alternating current phenomena, electrotherapy, and the wireless transmission of electrical energy. Tesla coil circuits were used commercially in spark-gap transmitters for wireless telegraphy until the 1920s, and in medical equipment such as electrotherapy and violet ray devices. Today, their main usage is for entertainment and educational displays, although small coils are still used as leak detectors for high-vacuum systems.

Originally, Tesla coils used fixed spark gaps or rotary spark gaps to provide intermittent excitation of the resonant circuit; more recently, electronic devices are used to provide the switching action required.

== Operation ==
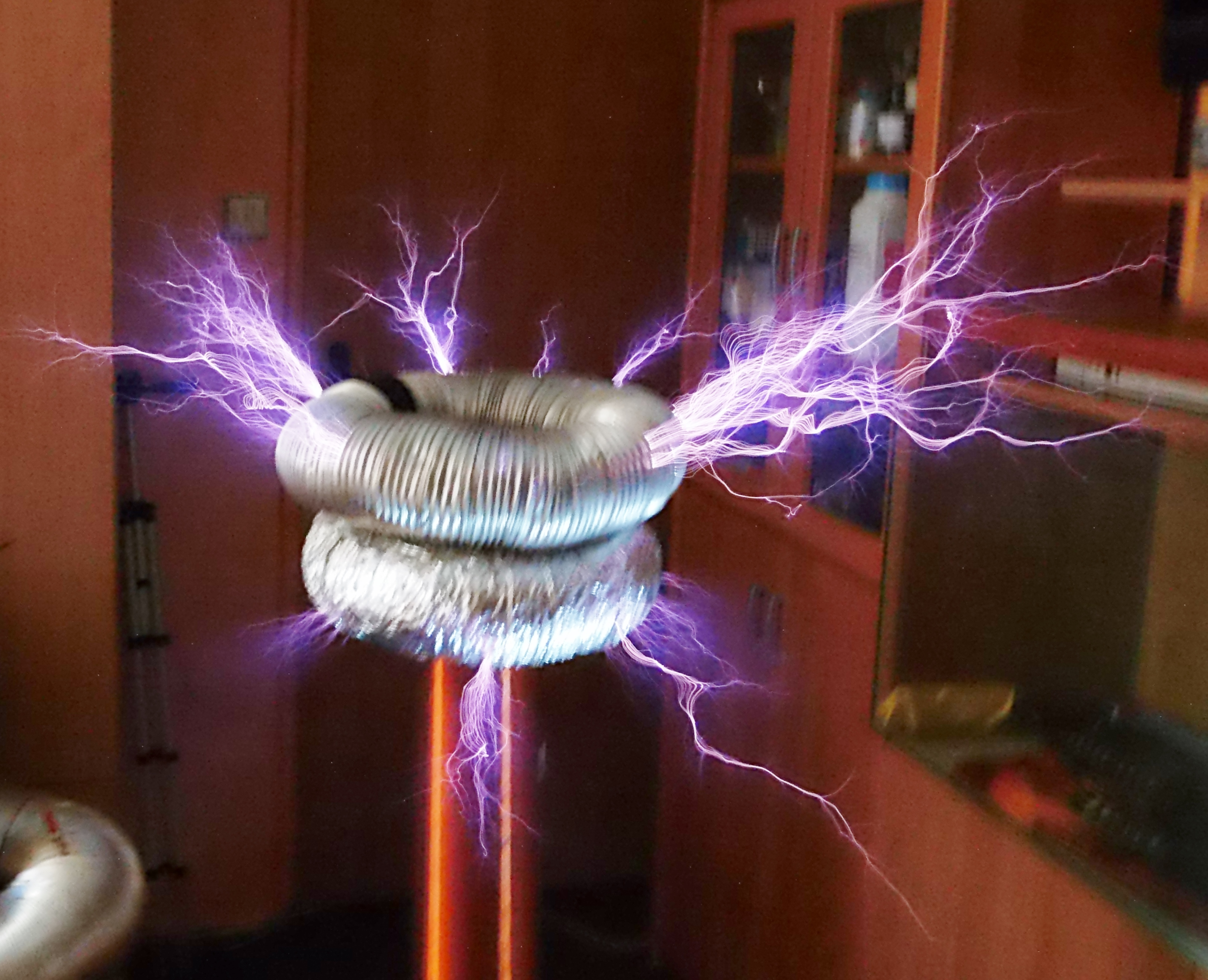
Homemade Tesla coil in operation, showing brush discharges from the toroid. The high electric field causes the air around the high-voltage terminal to ionize and conduct electricity, allowing electricity to leak into the air in colorful corona discharges, brush discharges and streamer arcs.

Unipolar Tesla coil circuit. C2 is not an actual capacitor but represents the capacitance of the secondary windings L2, plus the capacitance to ground of the toroid electrode E.

A Tesla coil is a high-frequency, air-cored resonant transformer, which can be used to produce very high voltages. In Tesla’s early designs, a simple spark gap was used to set up the oscillations in a tuned, radio-frequency transformer.

Tesla coils can produce output voltages from 50 kilovolts to several million volts for large coils. The alternating current output is in the low radio frequency range, usually between 50 kHz and 1 MHz.

The original, spark-excited Tesla coil circuit, shown below, consists of these components:

- A high-voltage supply transformer (T), to step the AC mains voltage up to a high enough voltage to jump the spark gap. Typical voltages are between 5 and 30 kilovolts (kV).
- A capacitor (C1) that forms a tuned circuit with the primary winding L1 of the Tesla transformer
- A spark gap (SG) that acts as a switch in the primary circuit
- The Tesla coil (L1, L2), an air-core double-tuned resonant transformer, that generates the high output voltage.
- Optionally, a capacitive electrode (top load) (E) in the form of a smooth metal sphere or torus attached to the secondary terminal of the coil. Its large surface area suppresses premature air breakdown and arc discharges, increasing the Q factor and output voltage.

=== Resonant transformer ===
The specialized transformer used in the Tesla coil circuit (L1,L2), called a resonant transformer or radio-frequency (RF) transformer, functions on different principles to transformers used in AC power circuits. While an iron-cored transformer is designed to transfer energy efficiently from primary to secondary winding, the resonant transformer is designed to temporarily store and transfer high frequency currents. A primary winding is in parallel with a capacitor, while the secondary winding has a "parasitic" capacitance with its inductor, as illustrated by the diagram. The inductors and capacitors together function as two LC circuits, "tuned" so they have the same resonant frequency, and each spark briefly completes a circuit on the primary side, producing oscillation back and forth between the primary and secondary. This is analogous to the way a tuning fork stores vibrational mechanical energy.

The primary coil (L1) consists of relatively few turns of heavy copper wire or tubing, and is wired in parallel to a capacitor (C1). Current flows through the spark gap (SG) with each spark, and repetitively energizes the primary side LC circuit. The secondary coil (L2) consists of hundreds to thousands of turns of wire on a hollow cylindrical form, and the primary is coupled to it by being wound on an insulating former outside it.

The inductance of (L2) resonates with stray capacitance (C2) and the capacitance of the toroid's metal electrode attached to the high-voltage terminal.

The peculiar design of the coil is dictated by the need to achieve low resistive energy losses (high Q factor) at high frequencies, which results in the largest secondary voltages:

- The coils in a Tesla transformer are loosely coupled. The primary winding is larger in diameter and spaced apart from the secondary, so the mutual inductance is low and the coupling coefficient is typically 0.05 to 0.2; this means only 5% to 20% of the magnetic field of the primary passes through the secondary when open-circuited. The loose coupling slows the exchange of energy between the primary and secondary coils, which allows the oscillating energy to stay in the secondary circuit longer before it returns to the primary and begins dissipating in the spark.
- Each winding is also usually limited to a single layer of wire, which reduces proximity effect losses. The primary carries very high currents. Since high-frequency current mostly flows on the surface of conductors due to skin effect, it is often made of thick wire with a large surface area to reduce resistance, and its turns are spaced apart, which reduces proximity effect losses and arcing between turns.

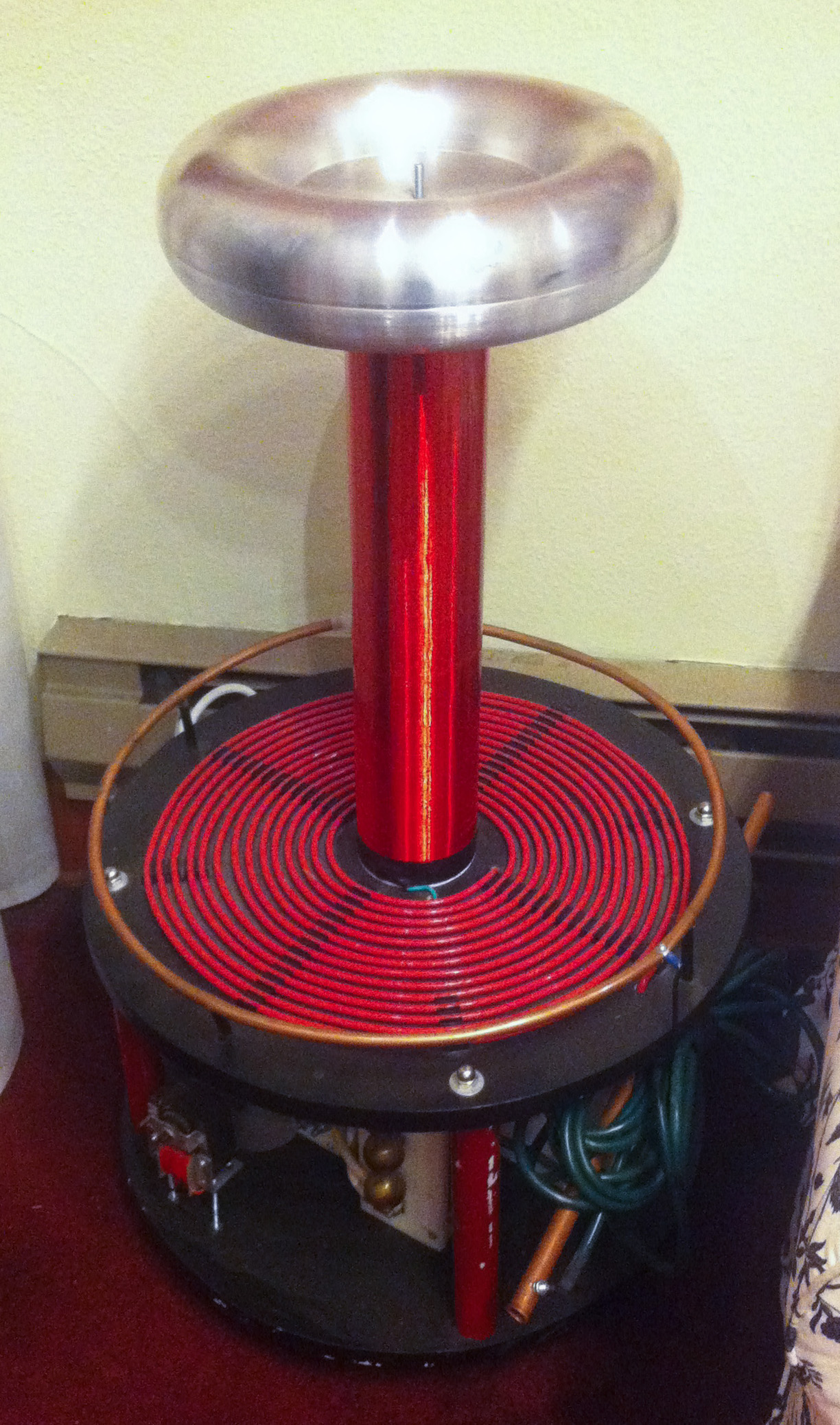
Unipolar coil design widely used in modern coils. The primary is the flat red spiral winding at bottom, the secondary is the vertical cylindrical coil wound with fine red wire. The high-voltage terminal is the aluminum torus at the top of the secondary coil.

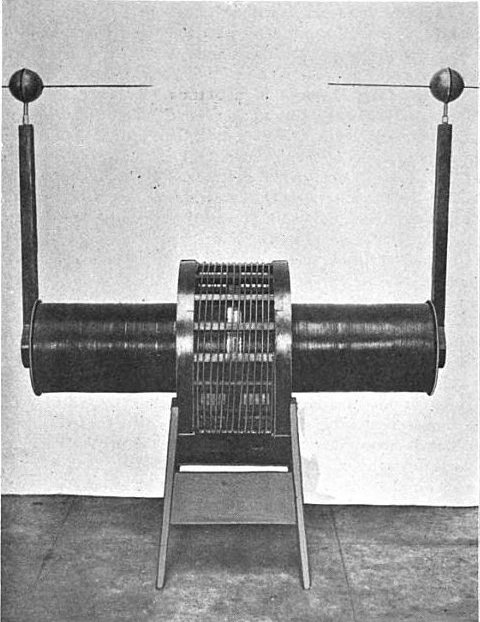
Bipolar coil, used in the early 20th century. There are two high-voltage output terminals, each connected to one end of the secondary, with a spark gap between them. The primary is 12 turns of heavy wire, which is located at the midpoint of the secondary to discourage arcs between the coils.

The output circuit can have two forms:

- Unipolar: One end of the secondary winding is connected to a single high-voltage terminal, the other end is grounded. This type is used in modern coils designed for entertainment. The primary winding is located near the bottom, low potential end of the secondary, to minimize arcs between the windings. Since the ground (Earth) serves as the return path for the high voltage, streamer arcs from the terminal tend to jump to any nearby grounded object.
- Bipolar: Neither end of the secondary winding is grounded, and both are brought out to high-voltage terminals. The primary winding is located at the center of the secondary coil, equidistant between the two high potential terminals, to discourage arcing.

=== Operation cycle ===
The circuit operates in a rapidly repeating cycle in which the supply transformer (T) charges the primary capacitor (C1) up, which then discharges in a spark through the spark gap, creating a brief pulse of oscillating current in the primary circuit which excites a high oscillating voltage across the secondary:

1. Current from the supply transformer (T) charges the capacitor (C1) to a high voltage.
2. When the voltage across the capacitor reaches the breakdown voltage of the spark gap (SG) a spark starts, reducing the spark gap resistance to a very low value. This completes the primary circuit and current from the capacitor flows through the primary coil (L1). The current flows rapidly back and forth between the plates of the capacitor through the coil, generating radio frequency oscillating current in the primary circuit at the circuit's resonant frequency.
3. The oscillating magnetic field of the primary winding induces an oscillating current in the secondary winding (L2), by Faraday's law of induction. Over a number of cycles, the energy in the primary circuit is transferred to the secondary. The total energy in the tuned circuits is limited to the energy originally stored in the capacitor C1, so as the oscillating voltage in the secondary increases in amplitude ("ring up") the oscillations in the primary decrease to zero. Although the ends of the secondary coil are open, it also acts as a tuned circuit due to the capacitance (C2), the sum of the parasitic capacitance between the turns of the coil plus the capacitance of the toroid electrode E. Current flows rapidly back and forth through the secondary coil between its ends. Because of the small capacitance, the oscillating voltage across the secondary coil which appears on the output terminal is much larger than the primary voltage.
4. The secondary current creates a magnetic field that induces voltage back in the primary coil, and over a number of additional cycles the energy is transferred back to the primary, causing the oscillating voltage in the secondary to decrease ("ring down"). This process repeats, the energy shifting rapidly back and forth between the primary and secondary tuned circuits. The oscillating currents in the primary and secondary gradually die out due to energy dissipated as heat in the spark gap and resistance of the coil.
5. When the current through the spark gap is no longer sufficient to keep the air in the gap ionized, the spark stops ("quenches"), terminating the current in the primary circuit. The oscillating current in the secondary may continue for some time.
6. The current from the supply transformer begins charging the capacitor C1 again and the cycle repeats.

This entire cycle takes place very rapidly, the oscillations dying out in a time of the order of a millisecond. Each spark across the spark gap produces a pulse of damped sinusoidal high voltage at the output terminal of the coil. Each pulse dies out before the next spark occurs, so the coil generates a string of damped waves, not a continuous sinusoidal voltage. The high voltage from the supply transformer that charges the capacitor is a 50 or 60 Hz sine wave. Depending on how the spark gap is set, usually one or two sparks occur at the peak of each half-cycle of the mains current, so there are more than a hundred sparks per second. Thus the spark at the spark gap appears continuous, as do the high-voltage streamers from the top of the coil.

The supply transformer (T) secondary winding is connected across the primary tuned circuit. It might seem that the transformer would be a leakage path for the RF current, damping the oscillations. However its large inductance gives it a very high impedance at the resonant frequency, so it acts as an open circuit to the oscillating current. If the supply transformer has inadequate short-circuit inductance, radio frequency chokes are placed in its secondary leads to block the RF current.

=== Oscillation frequency ===
To produce the largest output voltage, the primary and secondary tuned circuits are adjusted to resonance with each other. The resonant frequencies of the primary and secondary circuits, $\scriptstyle f_1$ and $\scriptstyle f_2$, are determined by the inductance and capacitance in each circuit:

$$f_1 = {1 \over {2\pi \sqrt {L_1 C_1}}} \qquad \qquad f_2 = {1 \over {2\pi \sqrt {L_2 C_2}}}\,$$

Generally the secondary is not adjustable, so the primary circuit is tuned, usually by a moveable tap on the primary coil L_{1}, until it resonates at the same frequency as the secondary:

$$f = {1 \over {2\pi \sqrt {L_1 C_1}}} = {1 \over {2\pi \sqrt {L_2 C_2}}}\,$$

Thus the condition for resonance between primary and secondary is:

$$L_1 C_1 = L_2 C_2\,$$

The resonant frequency of Tesla coils is in the low radio frequency (RF) range, usually between 50 kHz and 1 MHz. However, because of the impulsive nature of the spark they produce broadband radio noise, and without shielding can be a significant source of RFI, interfering with nearby radio and television reception.

=== Output voltage ===
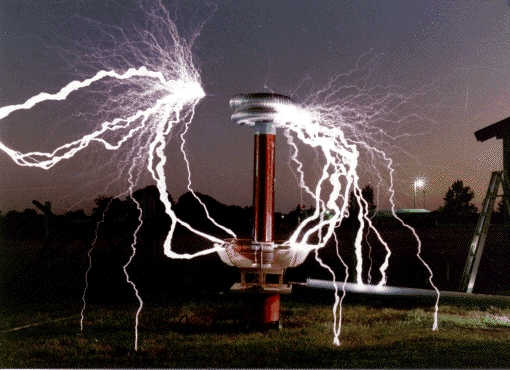
Large coil producing 3.5 meter (10 foot) streamer arcs, indicating a potential of millions of volts

In a resonant transformer the high voltage is produced by resonance; the output voltage is not proportional to the turns ratio, as in an ordinary transformer. It can be calculated approximately from conservation of energy. At the beginning of the cycle, when the spark starts, all of the energy in the primary circuit $W_1$ is stored in the primary capacitor $C_1$. If $V_1$ is the voltage at which the spark gap breaks down, which is usually close to the peak output voltage of the supply transformer T, this energy is

$$W_1 = {1 \over 2}C_1V_1^2\,$$

During the "ring up" this energy is transferred to the secondary circuit. Although some is lost as heat in the spark and other resistances, in modern coils, over 85% of the energy ends up in the secondary. At the peak ($V_2$) of the secondary sinusoidal voltage waveform, all the energy in the secondary $W_2$ is stored in the capacitance $C_2$ between the ends of the secondary coil

$$W_2 = {1 \over 2}C_2V_2^2\,$$

Assuming no energy losses, $W_2\;=\;W_1$. Substituting into this equation and simplifying, the peak secondary voltage is

$V_2 = V_1\sqrt{C_1 \over C_2} = V_1\sqrt{L_2 \over L_1}.$

The second formula above is derived from the first using the resonance condition $L_1 C_1\;=\;L_2 C_2$. Since the capacitance of the secondary coil is very small compared to the primary capacitor, the primary voltage is stepped up to a high value.

The above peak voltage is only achieved in coils in which air discharges do not occur; in coils which produce sparks, like entertainment coils, the peak voltage on the terminal is limited to the voltage at which the air breaks down and becomes conductive. As the output voltage increases during each voltage pulse, it reaches the point where the air next to the high-voltage terminal ionizes and corona, brush discharges, and streamer arcs break out from the terminal. This happens when the electric field strength exceeds the dielectric strength of the air, about 30 kV per centimeter. Since the electric field is greatest at sharp points and edges, air discharges start at these points on the high-voltage terminal. The voltage on the high-voltage terminal cannot increase above the air breakdown voltage, because additional electric charge pumped into the terminal from the secondary winding just escapes into the air. The output voltage of open-air Tesla coils is limited to a few million volts by air breakdown, but higher voltages can be achieved by coils immersed in pressurized tanks of insulating oil.

=== Top electrode ===
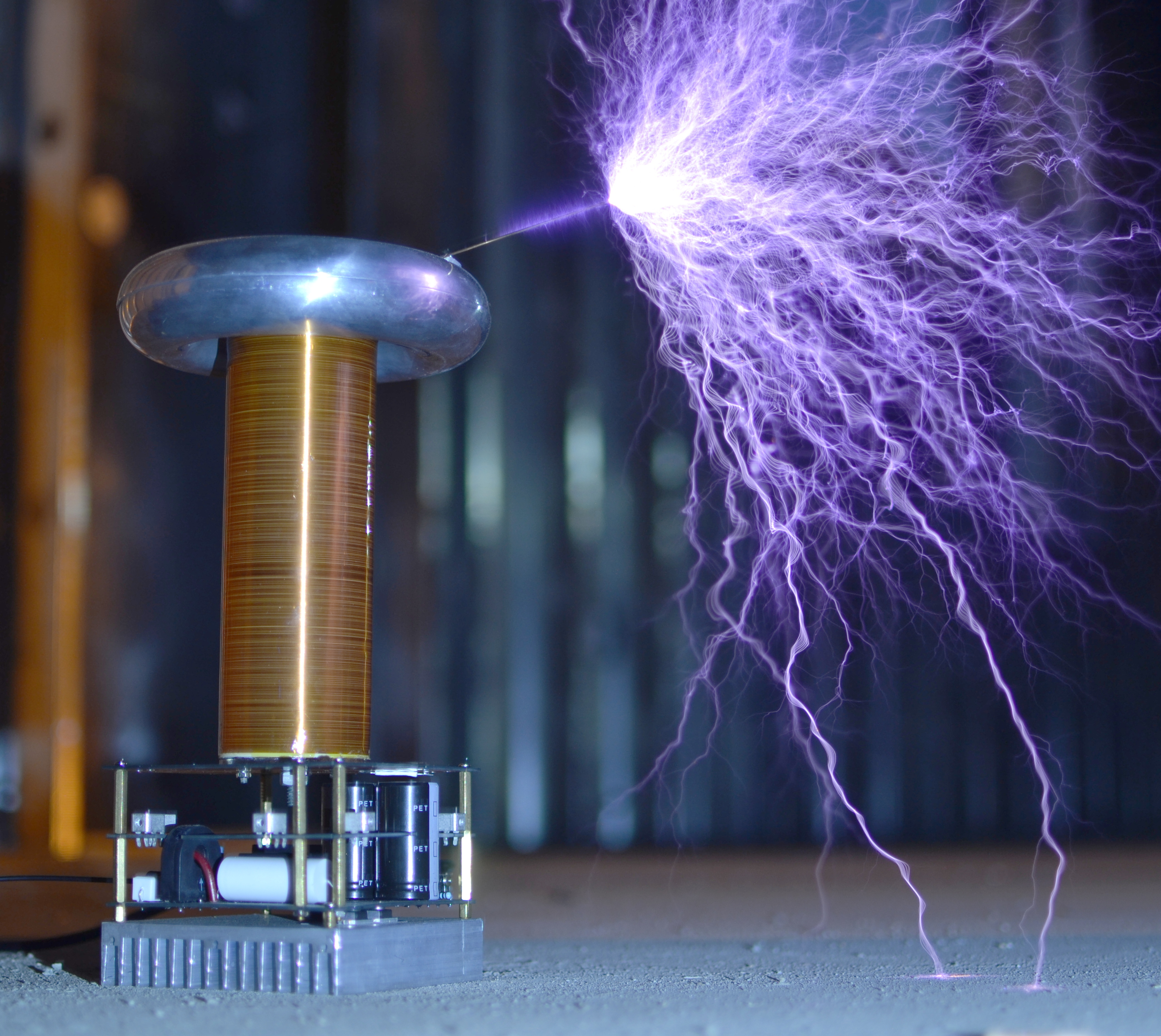
Solid state DRSSTC Tesla coil with pointed wire attached to toroid to produce brush discharge

Some Tesla coil designs have a smooth spherical or toroidal metal electrode on the high-voltage terminal. The electrode serves as one plate of a capacitor, with the Earth as the other plate, increasing the secondary capacitance. The large diameter curved surface reduces the electric field at the high-voltage terminal, increasing the voltage threshold at which air discharges. Suppressing premature air breakdown and energy loss allows the voltage to build to higher values, creating longer, more energetic discharges.

If the top electrode is too large and smooth, the electric field at its surface may not be high enough cause air breakdown. Some entertainment coils have a sharp "spark point" projecting from the electrode to start discharges.

== Types ==
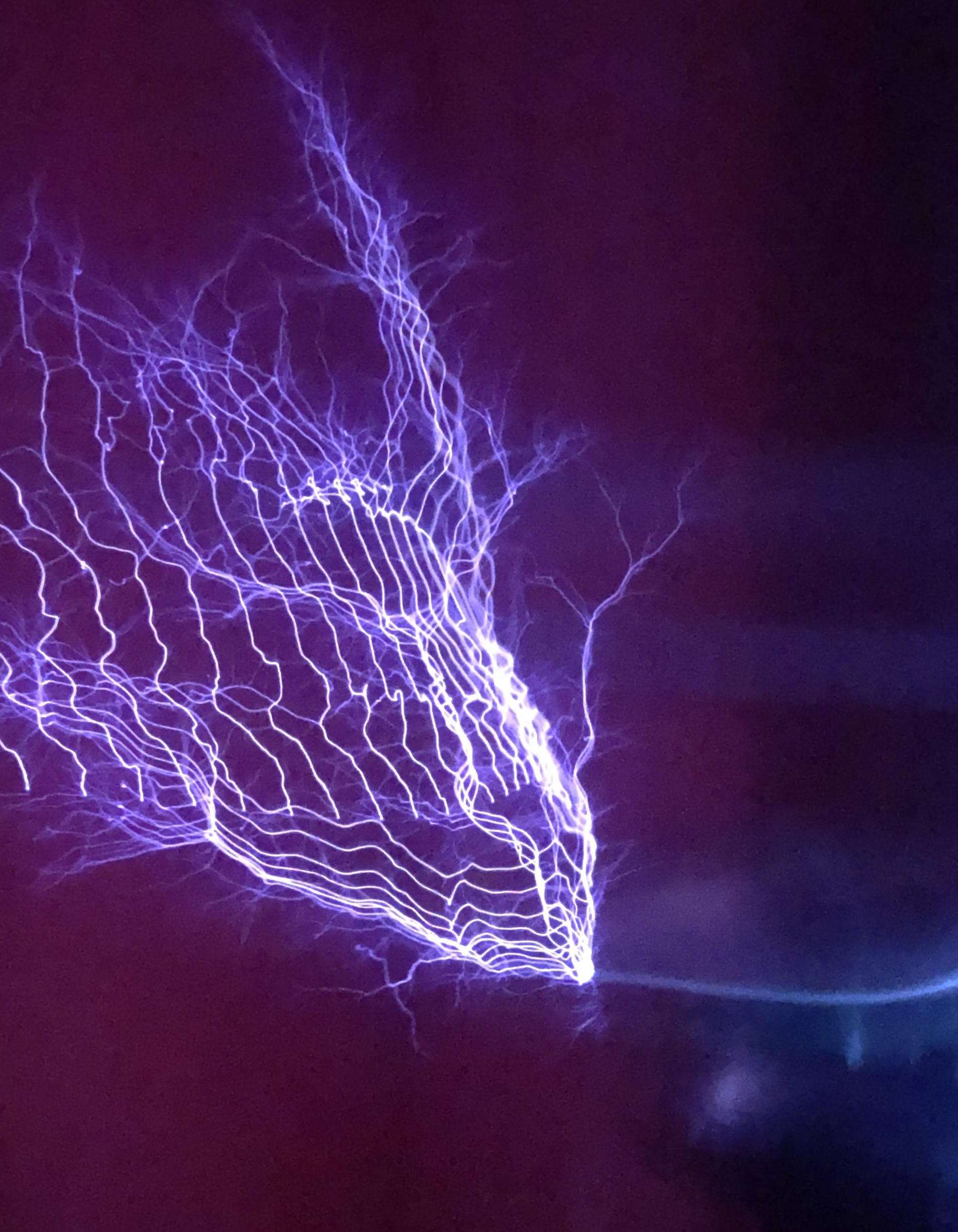
Plasma at the top of a Dual Resonant Solid State Tesla Coil.

The term Tesla coil is applied to a number of high-voltage resonant transformer circuits.

=== Excitation ===
Tesla coil circuits can be classified by the type of "excitation" they use, what type of circuit is used to apply current to the primary winding of the resonant transformer:

- Spark-excited or Spark Gap Tesla Coil (SGTC): This type uses a spark gap to close the primary circuit, discharging a capacitor through the resonant transformer, exciting oscillations. Spark gaps have disadvantages due to the high primary currents they must handle. They produce a very loud noise while operating, noxious ozone gas, and high temperatures which may require a cooling system. The energy dissipated in the spark also reduces the Q factor and the output voltage. Tesla's coils were all spark-excited.
  - Static spark gap: This is the most common type, which was described in detail in the previous section. It is used in most entertainment coils. An AC voltage from a high-voltage supply transformer charges a capacitor, which discharges through the spark gap. The spark rate is not adjustable but is determined by the 50 or 60 Hz line frequency. Multiple sparks may occur on each half-cycle, so the pulses of output voltage may not be equally-spaced.
  - Static triggered spark gap: Commercial and industrial circuits often apply a DC voltage from a power supply to charge the capacitor, and use high-voltage pulses generated by an oscillator applied to a triggering electrode to trigger the spark. This allows control of the spark rate and exciting voltage. Commercial spark gaps are often enclosed in an insulating gas atmosphere such as sulfur hexafluoride, reducing the length and thus the energy loss in the spark.
  - Rotary spark gap: These use a spark gap consisting of electrodes around the periphery of a wheel rotated at high speed by a motor, which create sparks when they pass by a stationary electrode. Tesla used this type on his big coils, and they are used today on large entertainment coils. The rapid separation speed of the electrodes quenches the spark quickly, allowing "first notch" quenching, making possible higher voltages. The wheel is usually driven by a synchronous motor, so the sparks are synchronized with the AC line frequency, the spark occurring at the same point on the AC waveform on each cycle, so the primary pulses are repeatable.
- Switched or Solid State Tesla Coil (SSTC): These use power semiconductor devices, usually thyristors or transistors such as MOSFETs or IGBTs, triggered by a solid state oscillator circuit to switch pulses of voltage from a DC power supply through the primary winding. They provide pulsed excitation without the disadvantages of a spark gap: the loud noise, high temperatures, and poor efficiency. The voltage, frequency, and excitation waveform can be finely controllable. SSTCs are used in most commercial, industrial, and research applications as well as higher quality entertainment coils.
  - Single resonant solid state Tesla coil (SRSSTC): In this circuit the primary does not have a resonant capacitor, only the secondary does; so it is a single tuned circuit, not a double-tuned circuit. The current to the primary from the switching transistors excites resonance in the secondary tuned circuit. Single tuned SSTCs are simpler, but the single resonant circuit usually has a lower Q factor and so stores less energy and produces lower voltages than double resonant circuits, other things being equal.
  - Dual Resonant Solid State Tesla Coil (DRSSTC): The circuit is similar to the double tuned spark excited circuit, except in place of the AC supply transformer (T) in the primary circuit a DC power supply charges the capacitor, and in place of the spark gap semiconductor switches complete the circuit between the capacitor and the primary coil.
    Star Wars theme performed on a Tesla coil, Niagara Parks Power Station, 2024
  - Singing Tesla coil or musical Tesla coil: This is not a separate type of excitation, but a modification to the solid state primary circuit to create a Tesla coil which can be played like a musical instrument, with its high-voltage discharges reproducing simple musical tones. The drive voltage pulses applied to the primary are modulated at an audio rate by a solid state "interrupter" circuit, causing the arc discharge from the high-voltage terminal to emit sounds. Only tones and simple chords have been produced so far; the coil cannot function as a loudspeaker, reproducing complex music or voice sounds. The sound output is controlled by a keyboard or MIDI file applied to the circuit through a MIDI interface. Two modulation techniques have been used: AM (amplitude modulation of the exciting voltage) and PFM (pulse-frequency modulation). These are mainly built as novelties for entertainment.
- Continuous wave: In these the transformer is driven by a feedback oscillator, which applies a pulse of current to the primary winding each cycle of the RF current, exciting a continuous oscillation. The primary tuned circuit serves as the tank circuit of the oscillator, and the circuit resembles a radio transmitter. Unlike the previous circuits which generate a pulsed output, they generate a continuous sine wave output. Power vacuum tubes are often used as active devices instead of transistors because they are more robust and tolerant of overloads. In general, continuous excitation produces lower output voltages from a given input power than pulsed excitation.

=== Number of coils ===
Tesla circuits can also be classified by how many resonant coils (inductors) they contain:

- Two coil or double-resonant circuits: Virtually all present Tesla coils use the two coil resonant transformer, consisting of a primary winding to which current pulses are applied, and a secondary winding that produces the high voltage, invented by Tesla in 1891. The term "Tesla coil" normally refers to these circuits.
- Three coil, triple-resonant, or magnifier circuits: These are circuits with three coils, based on Tesla's "magnifying transmitter" circuit which he began experimenting with sometime before 1898 and installed in his Colorado Springs lab 1899–1900, and patented in 1902. They consist of a two coil air-core step-up transformer similar to the Tesla transformer, with the secondary connected to a third coil not magnetically coupled to the others, called the "extra" or "resonator" coil, which is series-fed and resonates with its own capacitance. The output is taken from the free end of this coil. The presence of three energy-storing tank circuits gives this circuit more complicated resonant behavior. It is the subject of research, but has been used in few practical applications.

== History ==
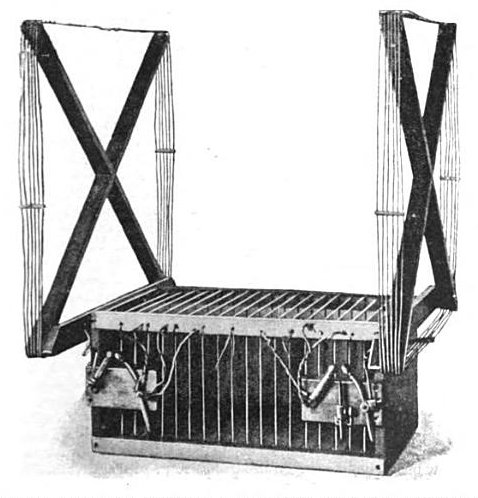
Henry Rowland's 1889 spark-excited resonant transformer, a predecessor to the Tesla coil

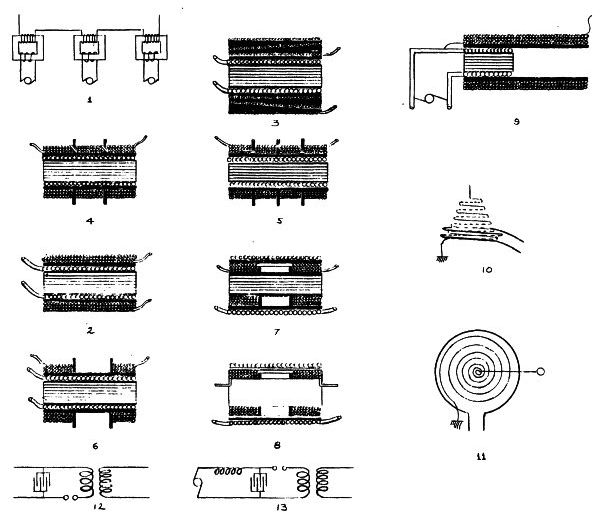
Steps in Tesla's development of the Tesla transformer around 1891: (1) Closed-core transformers used at low frequencies, (2–7) rearranging windings for lower losses, (8) removed iron core, (9) partial core, (10–11) final conical Tesla transformer, (12–13) Tesla coil circuits and Elihu Thomson

Electrical oscillation and resonant air-core transformer circuits had been explored before Tesla. Resonant circuits using Leyden jars were invented beginning in 1826 by Felix Savary, Joseph Henry, William Thomson, and Oliver Lodge. and Henry Rowland built a resonant transformer in 1889. Elihu Thomson invented the Tesla coil circuit independently at the same time Tesla did. Tesla patented his Tesla coil circuit April 25, 1891. and first publicly demonstrated it May 20, 1891, in his lecture "Experiments with Alternate Currents of Very High Frequency and Their Application to Methods of Artificial Illumination" before the American Institute of Electrical Engineers at Columbia College, New York. Although Tesla patented many similar circuits during this period, this was the first that contained all the elements of the Tesla coil: high-voltage primary transformer, capacitor, spark gap, and air core "oscillation transformer".

== Modern-day Tesla coils ==
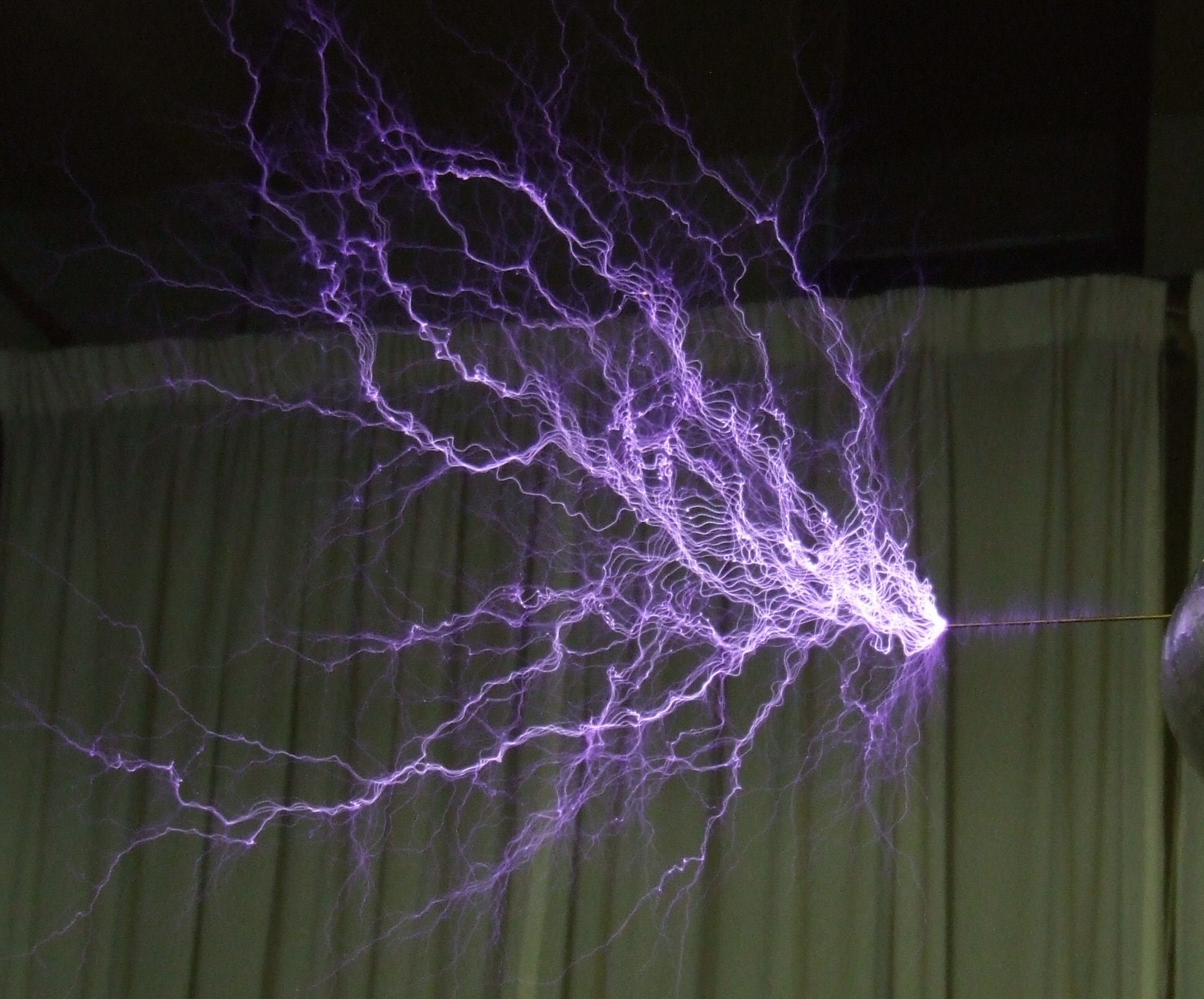
Electric discharge showing the lightning-like plasma filaments from a 'Tesla coil'

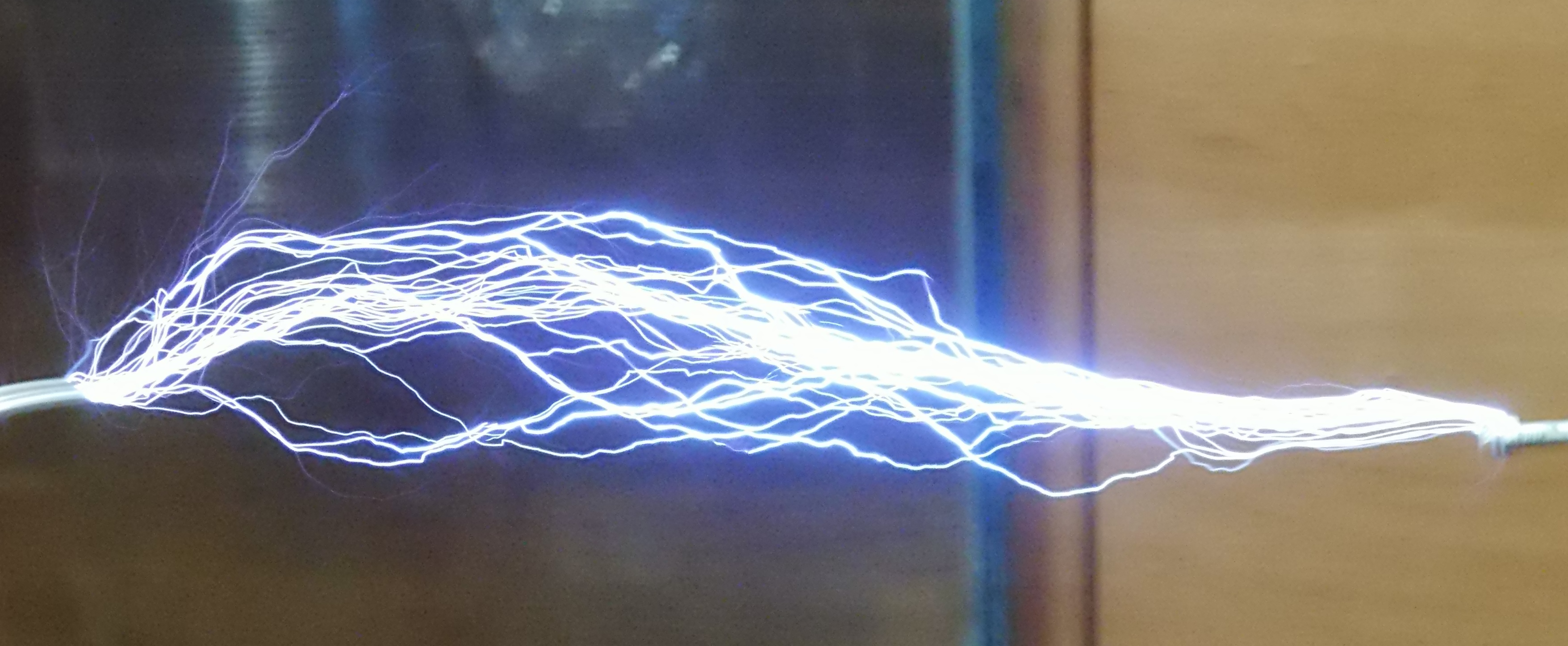
Tesla coil (discharge)

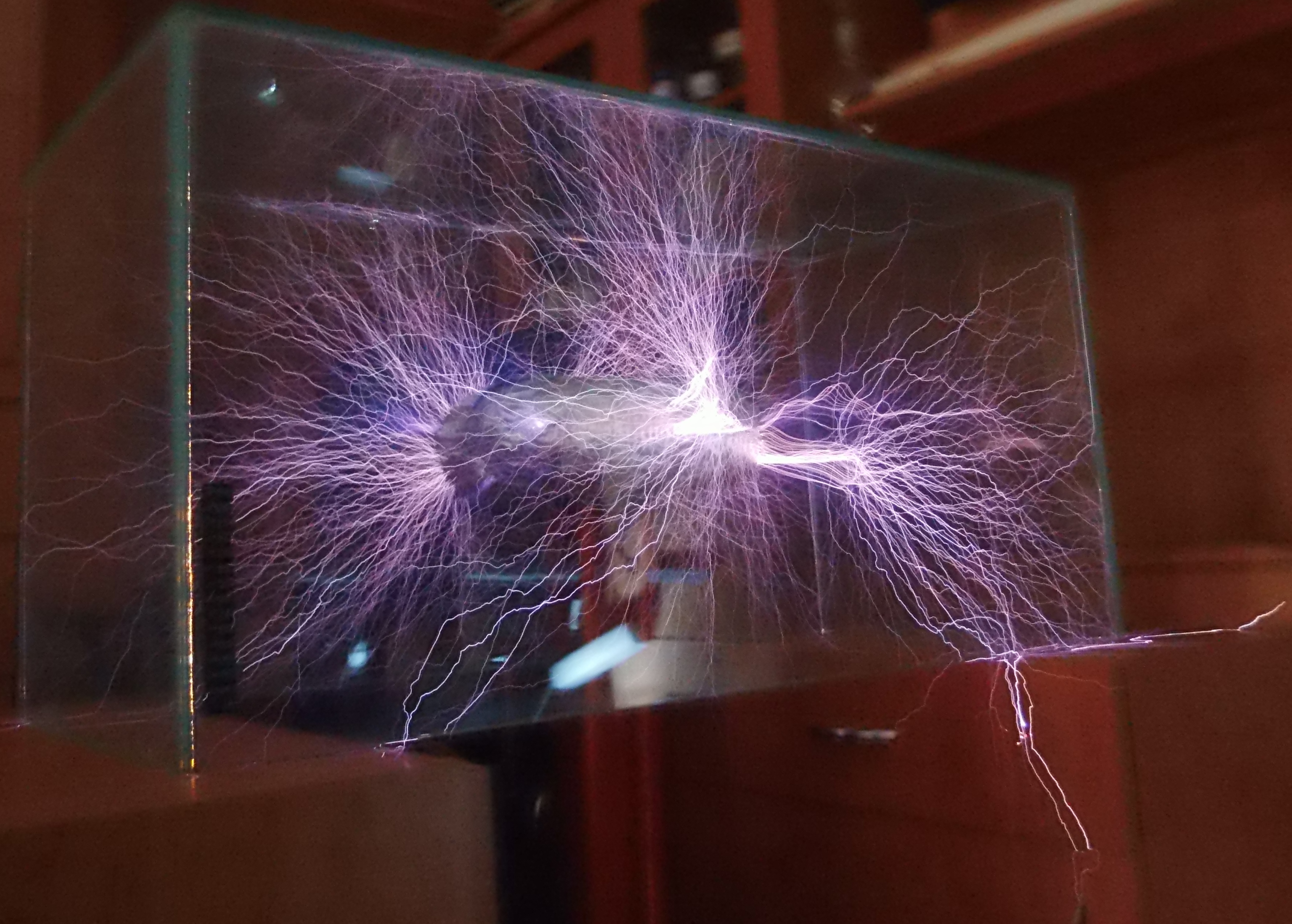
Tesla coil in terrarium (I)

Modern high-voltage enthusiasts usually build Tesla coils similar to some of Tesla's "later" 2-coil air-core designs. These typically consist of a primary tank circuit, a series LC (inductance-capacitance) circuit composed of a high-voltage capacitor, spark gap, and primary coil; and the secondary LC circuit, a series-resonant circuit consisting of the secondary coil plus a terminal capacitance or "top load". In Tesla's more advanced (magnifier) design, a third coil is added. The secondary LC circuit is composed of a tightly coupled air-core transformer secondary coil driving the bottom of a separate third coil helical resonator. Modern 2-coil systems use a single secondary coil. The top of the secondary is then connected to a topload terminal, which forms one 'plate' of a capacitor, the other 'plate' being the earth (or "ground"). The primary LC circuit is tuned so that it resonates at the same frequency as the secondary LC circuit. The primary and secondary coils are magnetically coupled, creating a dual-tuned resonant air-core transformer. Earlier oil-insulated Tesla coils needed large and long insulators at their high-voltage terminals to prevent discharge in air. Later Tesla coils spread their electric fields over larger distances to prevent high electrical stresses in the first place, thereby allowing operation in free air. Most modern Tesla coils also use toroid-shaped output terminals. These are often fabricated from spun metal or flexible aluminum ducting. The toroidal shape helps to control the high electric field near the top of the secondary by directing sparks outward and away from the primary and secondary windings.

A more complex version of a Tesla coil, termed a "magnifier" by Tesla, uses a more tightly coupled air-core resonance "driver" transformer (or "master oscillator") and a smaller, remotely located output coil (called the "extra coil" or simply the resonator) that has a large number of turns on a relatively small coil form. The bottom of the driver's secondary winding is connected to ground. The opposite end is connected to the bottom of the extra coil through an insulated conductor that is sometimes called the transmission line. Since the transmission line operates at relatively high RF voltages, it is typically made of 1" diameter metal tubing to reduce corona losses. Since the third coil is located some distance away from the driver, it is not magnetically coupled to it. RF energy is instead directly coupled from the output of the driver into the bottom of the third coil, causing it to "ring up" to very high voltages. The combination of the two-coil driver and third coil resonator adds another degree of freedom to the system, making tuning considerably more complex than that of a 2-coil system. The transient response for multiple resonance networks (of which the Tesla magnifier is a sub-set) has only recently been solved. It is now known that a variety of useful tuning "modes" are available, and in most operating modes the extra coil will ring at a different frequency than the master oscillator.

=== Primary switching ===
Demonstration of the Nevada Lightning Laboratory 1:12 scale prototype twin Tesla Coil at Maker Faire 2008

Modern transistor or vacuum tube Tesla coils do not use a primary spark gap. Instead, the transistor(s) or vacuum tube(s) provide the switching or amplifying function necessary to generate RF power for the primary circuit. Solid-state Tesla coils use the lowest primary operating voltage, typically between 155 and 800 volts, and drive the primary winding using either a single, half-bridge, or full-bridge arrangement of bipolar junction transistors, MOSFETs, or IGBTs to switch the primary current. Vacuum tube coils typically operate with plate voltages between 1500 and 6000 volts, while most spark gap coils operate with primary voltages of 6,000 to 25,000 volts. The primary winding of a traditional transistor Tesla coil is wound around only the bottom portion of the secondary coil. This configuration illustrates operation of the secondary as a pumped resonator. The primary 'induces' alternating voltage into the bottom-most portion of the secondary, providing regular 'pushes' (similar to providing properly timed pushes to a playground swing). Additional energy is transferred from the primary to the secondary inductance and top-load capacitance during each "push", and secondary output voltage builds (called 'ring-up'). An electronic feedback circuit is usually used to adaptively synchronize the primary oscillator to the growing resonance in the secondary, and this is the only tuning consideration beyond the initial choice of a reasonable top-load.

In a dual resonant solid-state Tesla coil (DRSSTC), the electronic switching of the solid-state Tesla coil is combined with the resonant primary circuit of a spark-gap Tesla coil. The resonant primary circuit is formed by connecting a capacitor in series with the primary winding of the coil, so that the combination forms a series tank circuit with a resonant frequency near that of the secondary circuit. Because of the additional resonant circuit, one manual and one adaptive tuning adjustment are necessary. Also, an interrupter is usually used to reduce the duty cycle of the switching bridge, to improve peak power capabilities; similarly, IGBTs are more popular in this application than bipolar junction transistors or MOSFETs, due to their superior power handling characteristics. A current-limiting circuit is usually used to limit maximum primary tank current (which must be switched by the IGBTs) to a safe level. Performance of a DRSSTC can be comparable to a medium-power spark-gap Tesla coil, and efficiency (as measured by spark length versus input power) can be significantly greater than a spark-gap Tesla coil operating at the same input power.

== Practical aspects of design ==
=== High voltage production ===
Tesla coil schematics

Typical circuit configuration. Here, the spark gap shorts the high frequency across the first transformer that is supplied by alternating current. An inductance, not shown, protects the transformer. This design is favoured when a relatively fragile neon sign transformer is used.

Alternative circuit configuration. With the capacitor in parallel to the first transformer and the spark gap in series to the Tesla-coil primary, the AC supply transformer must be capable of withstanding high voltages at high frequencies.

A large Tesla coil of more modern design often operates at very high peak power levels, up to many megawatts (millions of watts, equivalent to thousands of horsepower). It is therefore adjusted and operated carefully, not only for efficiency and economy, but also for safety. If, due to improper tuning, the maximum voltage point occurs below the terminal, along the secondary coil, a discharge (spark) may break out and damage or destroy the coil wire, supports, or nearby objects.

Tesla experimented with these, and many other, circuit configurations (see right). The Tesla coil primary winding, spark gap and tank capacitor are connected in series. In each circuit, the AC supply transformer charges the tank capacitor until its voltage is sufficient to break down the spark gap. The gap suddenly fires, allowing the charged tank capacitor to discharge into the primary winding. Once the gap fires, the electrical behavior of either circuit is identical. Experiments have shown that neither circuit offers any marked performance advantage over the other.

However, in the typical circuit, the spark gap's short circuiting action prevents high-frequency oscillations from 'backing up' into the supply transformer. In the alternate circuit, high amplitude high-frequency oscillations that appear across the capacitor also are applied to the supply transformer's winding. This can induce corona discharges between turns that weaken and eventually destroy the transformer's insulation. Experienced Tesla coil builders almost exclusively use the top circuit, often augmenting it with low pass filters (resistor and capacitor (RC) networks) between the supply transformer and spark gap to help protect the supply transformer. This is especially important when using transformers with fragile high-voltage windings, such as neon sign transformers (NSTs). Regardless of which configuration is used, the HV transformer must be of a type that self-limits its secondary current by means of internal short-circuit inductance. A normal (low Short-circuit inductance) high-voltage transformer must use an external limiter (sometimes called a ballast) to limit current. NSTs are designed to have high Short-circuit inductance to limit their short circuit current to a safe level.

==== Tuning ====
The primary coil's resonant frequency is tuned to that of the secondary, by using low-power oscillations, then increasing the power (and retuning if necessary) until the system operates properly at maximum power. While tuning, a small projection (called a "breakout bump") is often added to the top terminal in order to stimulate corona and spark discharges (sometimes called streamers) into the surrounding air. Tuning can then be adjusted so as to achieve the longest streamers at a given power level, corresponding to a frequency match between the primary and secondary coil. Capacitive "loading" by the streamers tends to lower the resonant frequency of a Tesla coil operating under full power. A toroidal topload is often preferred to other shapes, such as a sphere. A toroid with a major diameter that is much larger than the secondary diameter provides improved shaping of the electric field at the topload. This provides better protection of the secondary winding (from damaging streamer strikes) than a sphere of similar diameter. And, a toroid permits fairly independent control of topload capacitance versus spark breakout voltage. A toroid's capacitance is mainly a function of its major diameter, while the spark breakout voltage is mainly a function of its minor diameter. A grid dip oscillator (GDO) is sometimes used to help facilitate initial tuning and aid in design. The resonant frequency of the secondary can be difficult to determine except by using a GDO or other experimental method, whereas the physical properties of the primary more closely represent lumped approximations of RF tank design. In this schema the secondary is built somewhat arbitrarily in imitation of other successful designs, or entirely so with supplies on hand, its resonant frequency is measured and the primary designed to suit.

==== Air discharges ====
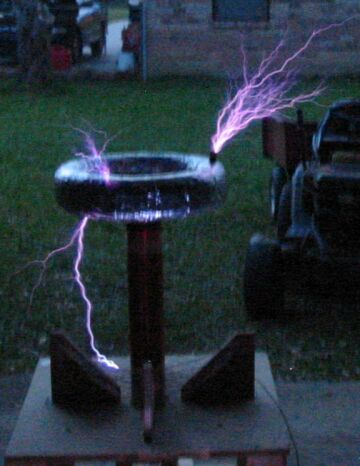
A small, later-type Tesla coil in operation: The output is giving 43-centimetre (17 in) sparks. The diameter of the secondary is 8 cm (3.1 in). The power source is a 10 000 V, 60 Hz current-limited supply.

In coils that produce air discharges, such as those built for entertainment, electrical energy from the secondary and toroid is transferred to the surrounding air as electrical charge, heat, light, and sound. The process is similar to charging or discharging a capacitor, except that a Tesla coil uses AC instead of DC. The current that arises from shifting charges within a capacitor is called a displacement current. Tesla coil discharges are formed as a result of displacement currents as pulses of electrical charge are rapidly transferred between the high-voltage toroid and nearby regions within the air (called space charge regions). Although the space charge regions around the toroid are invisible, they play a profound role in the appearance and location of Tesla coil discharges.

When the spark gap fires, the charged capacitor discharges into the primary winding, causing the primary circuit to oscillate. The oscillating primary current creates an oscillating magnetic field that couples to the secondary winding, transferring energy into the secondary side of the transformer and causing it to oscillate with the toroid capacitance to ground. Energy transfer occurs over a number of cycles, until most of the energy that was originally in the primary side is transferred to the secondary side. The greater the magnetic coupling between windings, the shorter the time required to complete the energy transfer. As energy builds within the oscillating secondary circuit, the amplitude of the toroid's RF voltage rapidly increases, and the air surrounding the toroid begins to undergo dielectric breakdown, forming a corona discharge.

As the secondary coil's energy (and output voltage) continue to increase, larger pulses of displacement current further ionize and heat the air at the point of initial breakdown. This forms a very electrically conductive "root" of hotter plasma, called a leader, that projects outward from the toroid. The plasma within the leader is considerably hotter than a corona discharge, and is considerably more conductive. In fact, its properties are similar to an electric arc. The leader tapers and branches into thousands of thinner, cooler, hair-like discharges (called streamers). The streamers look like a bluish 'haze' at the ends of the more luminous leaders. The streamers transfer charge between the leaders and toroid to nearby space charge regions. The displacement currents from countless streamers all feed into the leader, helping to keep it hot and electrically conductive.

The primary break rate of sparking Tesla coils is slow compared to the resonant frequency of the resonator-topload assembly. When the switch closes, energy is transferred from the primary LC circuit to the resonator where the voltage rings up over a short period of time up culminating in the electrical discharge. In a spark gap Tesla coil, the primary-to-secondary energy transfer process happens repetitively at typical pulsing rates of 50–500 times per second, depending on the frequency of the input line voltage. At these rates, previously-formed leader channels do not get a chance to fully cool down between pulses. So, on successive pulses, newer discharges can build upon the hot pathways left by their predecessors. This causes incremental growth of the leader from one pulse to the next, lengthening the entire discharge on each successive pulse. Repetitive pulsing causes the discharges to grow until the average energy available from the Tesla coil during each pulse balances the average energy being lost in the discharges (mostly as heat). At this point, dynamic equilibrium is reached, and the discharges have reached their maximum length for the Tesla coil's output power level. The unique combination of a rising high-voltage radio frequency envelope and repetitive pulsing seem to be ideally suited to creating long, branching discharges that are considerably longer than would be otherwise expected by output voltage considerations alone. High-voltage, low-energy discharges create filamentary multibranched discharges which are purplish-blue in colour. High-voltage, high-energy discharges create thicker discharges with fewer branches, are pale and luminous, almost white, and are much longer than low-energy discharges, because of increased ionisation. A strong smell of ozone and nitrogen oxides will occur in the area. The important factors for maximum discharge length appear to be voltage, energy, and still air of low to moderate humidity. There are comparatively few scientific studies about the initiation and growth of pulsed lower-frequency RF discharges, so some aspects of Tesla coil air discharges are not as well understood when compared to DC, power-frequency AC, HV impulse, and lightning discharges.

== Applications ==
Today, although small Tesla coils are used as leak detectors in scientific high-vacuum systems and igniters in arc welders, their main use is entertainment and educational displays.

=== Education and entertainment ===
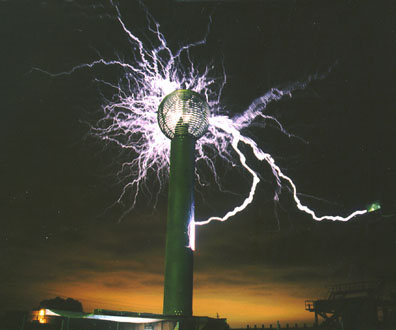
Electrum sculpture, the world's largest Tesla coil. Builder Eric Orr is visible sitting inside the hollow spherical high-voltage electrode.

Tesla coils are displayed as attractions at science museums and electronics fairs, and are used to demonstrate principles of high-frequency electricity in science classes in schools and colleges.

Since they are simple enough for an amateur to make, Tesla coils are a popular student science fair project, and are homemade by a large worldwide community of hobbyists. Builders of Tesla coils as a hobby are called "coilers". They attend "coiling" conventions where they display their home-made Tesla coils and other high-voltage devices. Low-power Tesla coils are also sometimes used as a high-voltage source for Kirlian photography.

The current world's largest Tesla coil is a 130,000-watt unit built by Greg Leyh and Eric Orr, part of a 38-foot-tall (12 m) sculpture titled Electrum owned by Alan Gibbs and currently residing in a private sculpture park at Kakanui Point near Auckland, New Zealand. Another very large Tesla coil, designed and built by Syd Klinge, is shown every year at the Coachella Valley Music and Arts Festival in Coachella, California.

Tesla coils can also be used to generate sounds, including music, by modulating the system's effective "break rate" (i.e., the rate and duration of high power RF bursts) via MIDI data and a control unit. The actual MIDI data is interpreted by a microcontroller which converts the MIDI data into a PWM output which can be sent to the Tesla coil via a fiber optic interface. An extensive outdoor musical concert has demonstrated using Tesla coils during the Engineering Open House (EOH) at the University of Illinois Urbana-Champaign. The Icelandic artist Björk used a Tesla coil in her song "Thunderbolt" as the main instrument in the song. The musical group ArcAttack uses modulated Tesla coils and a man in a chain-link suit to play music.

=== Vacuum system leak detectors ===
Scientists working with high-vacuum systems test for the presence of tiny pin holes in the apparatus (especially a newly blown piece of glassware) using high-voltage discharges produced by a small handheld Tesla coil. When the system is evacuated the high-voltage electrode of the coil is played over the outside of the apparatus. At low pressures, air is more easily ionized and thus conducts electricity better than atmospheric-pressure air. Therefore, the discharge travels through any pin hole immediately below it, producing a corona discharge inside the evacuated space which illuminates the hole, indicating points that need to be annealed or reblown before they can be used in an experiment.

=== Teslaphoresis ===
In 2016, Rice University scientists used the field of a Tesla coil to remotely align tiny carbon nanotubes into a circuit, a process they dubbed "teslaphoresis".

== Health issues ==
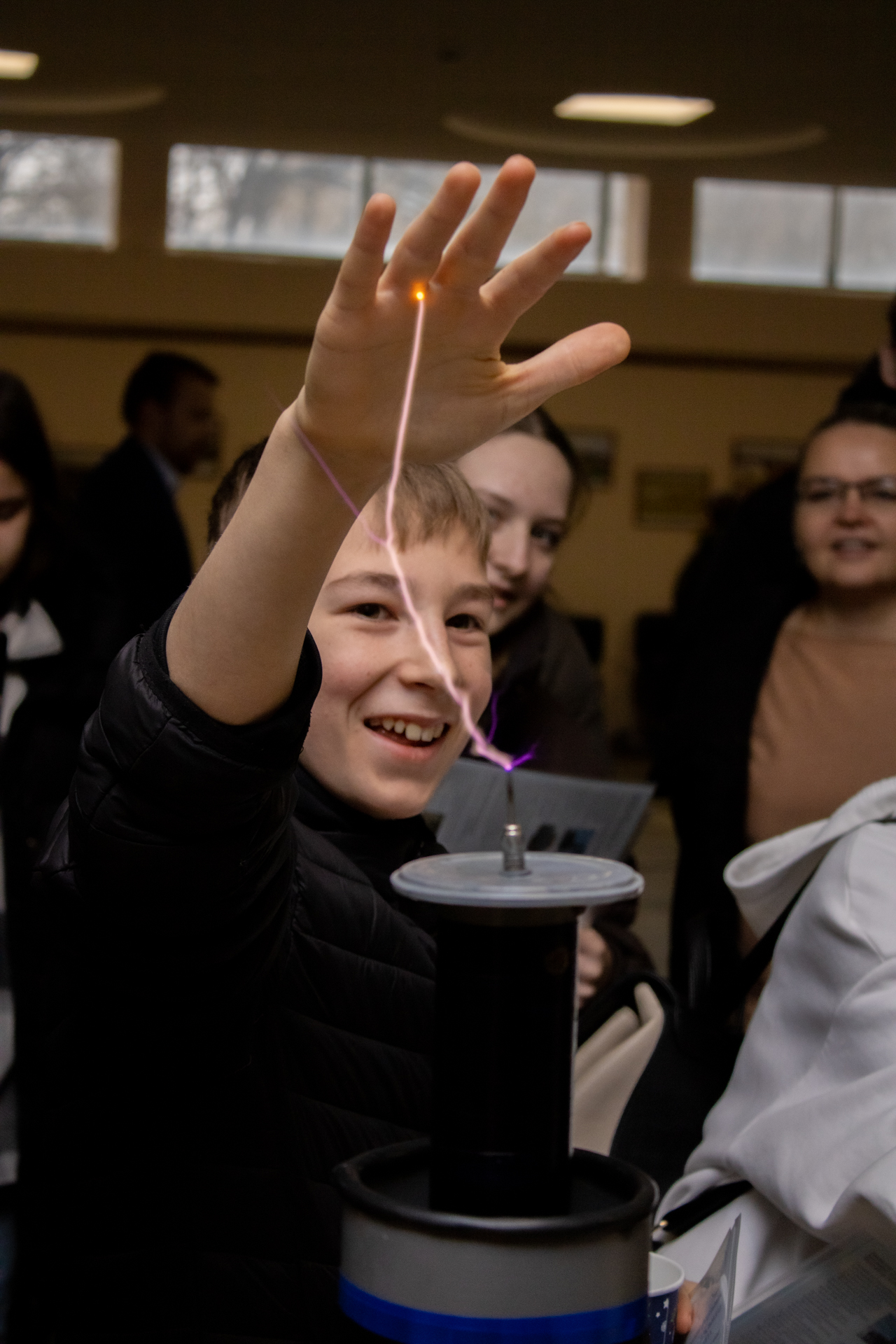
Boy allowing an arc from a Tesla coil to strike his hand.

The high-voltage radio frequency (RF) discharges from the output terminal of a Tesla coil pose a unique hazard not found in other high-voltage equipment: when passed through the body, they often do not cause the painful sensation and muscle contraction of electric shock, as lower frequency currents do. The nervous system is insensitive to currents with frequencies over 10–20 kHz. It is thought that the reason for this is that a certain minimum number of ions must be driven across a nerve cell's membrane by the imposed voltage to trigger the nerve cell to depolarize and transmit an impulse. At radio frequencies, there is insufficient time during a half-cycle for enough ions to cross the membrane before the alternating voltage reverses. The danger is that since no pain is felt, experimenters often assume the currents are harmless. Teachers and hobbyists demonstrating small Tesla coils often impress their audience by touching the high-voltage terminal or allowing the streamer arcs to pass through their body.

If the arcs from the high-voltage terminal strike the bare skin, they can cause deep-seated burns called RF burns. This is often avoided by allowing the arcs to strike a piece of metal held in the hand, or a thimble on a finger, instead. The current passes from the metal into the person's hand through a wide enough surface area to avoid causing burns. Often no sensation is felt, or just a warmth or tingling.

However, this does not mean the current is harmless. Even a small Tesla coil produces many times the electrical energy necessary to stop the heart, if the frequency happens to be low enough to cause ventricular fibrillation. A minor maladjustment of the coil could result in electrocution. In addition, the RF current heats the tissues it passes through. Carefully controlled Tesla coil currents, applied directly to the skin by electrodes, were used in the early 20th century for deep body tissue heating in the medical field of longwave diathermy. The amount of heating depends on the current density, which depends on the power output of the Tesla coil and the cross-sectional area of the path the current takes through the body to ground. Particularly if it passes through narrow structures such as blood vessels or joints it may raise the local tissue temperature to hyperthermic levels, "cooking" internal organs or causing other injuries. International ICNIRP safety standards for RF current in the body in the Tesla coil frequency range of 0.1–1 MHz specify a maximum current density of 0.2 mA per square centimeter and a maximum power absorption rate (SAR) in tissue of 4 W/kg in limbs and 0.8 W/kg average over the body. Even low power Tesla coils could exceed these limits, and it is generally impossible to determine the threshold current where bodily injury begins. Being struck by arcs from a high power (> 1000 Watt) Tesla coil is likely to be fatal.

Another reported hazard of this practice is that arcs from the high-voltage terminal often strike the primary winding of the coil. This momentarily creates a conductive path for the lethal 50 or 60 Hz primary current from the supply transformer to reach the output terminal. If a person is connected to the output terminal at the time, either by touching it or allowing arcs from the terminal to strike the person's body, then the high primary current could pass through the conductive ionized air path, through the body to ground, causing electrocution.

=== Skin-effect myth ===
An erroneous explanation for the absence of electric shock that has persisted among Tesla coil hobbyists is that the high-frequency currents travel through the body close to the surface, and thus do not penetrate to vital organs or nerves, due to an electromagnetic phenomenon called skin effect.

This theory is false. RF current does tend to flow on the surface of conductors due to skin effect, but the depth to which it penetrates, called skin depth, depends on the resistivity and permeability of the material as well as the frequency. Although skin effect limits currents of Tesla coil frequencies to the outer fraction of a millimeter in metal conductors, the skin depth of the current in body tissue is much deeper due to its higher resistivity. The depth of penetration of currents of Tesla frequency (0.1–1 MHz) in human tissues is roughly 24–72 centimeters (9–28 inches). Since even the deepest tissues are closer than this to the surface, skin effect has little influence on the path of the current through the body; it tends to take the path of minimum electrical impedance to ground, and can easily pass through the core of the body. In the medical therapy called longwave diathermy, carefully controlled RF current of Tesla frequencies was used for decades for deep tissue warming, including heating internal organs such as the lungs. Modern shortwave diathermy machines use a higher frequency of 27 MHz, which would have a correspondingly smaller skin depth, yet these frequencies are still able to penetrate deep body tissues.

== Related patents ==
Tesla's patents

- "Electrical Transformer Or Induction Device". U.S. Patent No. 433,702, August 5, 1890
- "Means for Generating Electric Currents", U.S. Patent No. 514,168, February 6, 1894
- "Electrical Transformer", Patent No. 593,138, November 2, 1897
- "Method Of Utilizing Radiant Energy", Patent No. 685,958 November 5, 1901
- "Method of Signaling", U.S. Patent No. 723,188, March 17, 1903
- "System of Signaling", U.S. Patent No. 725,605, April 14, 1903
- "Apparatus for Transmitting Electrical Energy", January 18, 1902, U.S. patent 1,119,732, December 1, 1914

Others' patents

- J. S. Stone, U.S. patent 714,832, "Apparatus for amplifying electromagnetic signal-waves". (Filed January 23, 1901; Issued December 2, 1902)
- A. Nickle, U.S. patent 2,125,804, "Antenna". (Filed May 25, 1934; Issued August 2, 1938)
- William W. Brown, U.S. patent 2,059,186, "Antenna structure". (Filed May 25, 1934; Issued October 27, 1936).
- Robert B. Dome, U.S. patent 2,101,674, "Antenna". (Filed May 25, 1934; Issued December 7, 1937)
- Armstrong, E. H., U.S. patent 1,113,149, "Wireless receiving system". 1914.
- Armstrong, E. H., U.S. patent 1,342,885, "Method of receiving high-frequency oscillation". 1922.
- Armstrong, E. H., U.S. patent 1,424,065, "Signalling system". 1922.
- Gerhard Freiherr Du Prel, U.S. patent 1,675,882, "High-frequency circuit". (Filed August 11, 1925; Issued July 3, 1928)
- Leydorf, G. F., U.S. patent 3,278,937, "Antenna near field coupling system". 1966.
- Van Voorhies, U.S. patent 6,218,998, "Toroidal helical antenna"
- Gene Koonce, U.S. patent 6,933,819, "Multifrequency electro-magnetic field generator". (Filed October 29, 2004; Issued August 23, 2005)

== See also ==
- Faraday cage
- Henry Leroy Transtrom, an inventor and showman who worked with high-voltage electricity
- List of Nikola Tesla patents
- Oudin coil – Resonant transformer circuit, invented in 1893 by Paul Marie Oudin
- Van de Graaff generator
