= Electrum (sculpture) =

Giant sculpture involving a tesla coil

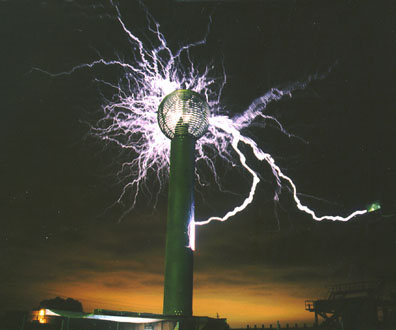
- Electrum during testing at Hunter's Point Naval Shipyard. Eric Orr sits within the electrode at top.
- Artists: Eric Orr and Greg Leyh
- Year: 1998
- Dimensions: 11.5 m (38 ft)
- Owner: Alan Gibbs

Electrum or Electrum (for Len Lye) (Len Lye being a New Zealand artist), is a 1998 sculpture by Eric Orr and Greg Leyh built around the world's largest Tesla coil. The coil stands 11.5 metres (37 feet) in height, operates at power levels up to 130,000 watts, and produces 3 million volts on its spherical top terminal. The sculpture is currently installed in a private area at Gibbs Farm in Kaukapakapa in New Zealand, a sculpture park art collection of businessman Alan Gibbs. The top, spherical electrode of the sculpture is large enough to hold a human. The piece was the subject of a 2000 documentary, "Electrum: Science as Art" and the 2011 documentary Lightning Dreams, by Alberta Chu.
