= Gemini G.E.L. =

Coordinates: 34.084478°N 118.37253°W

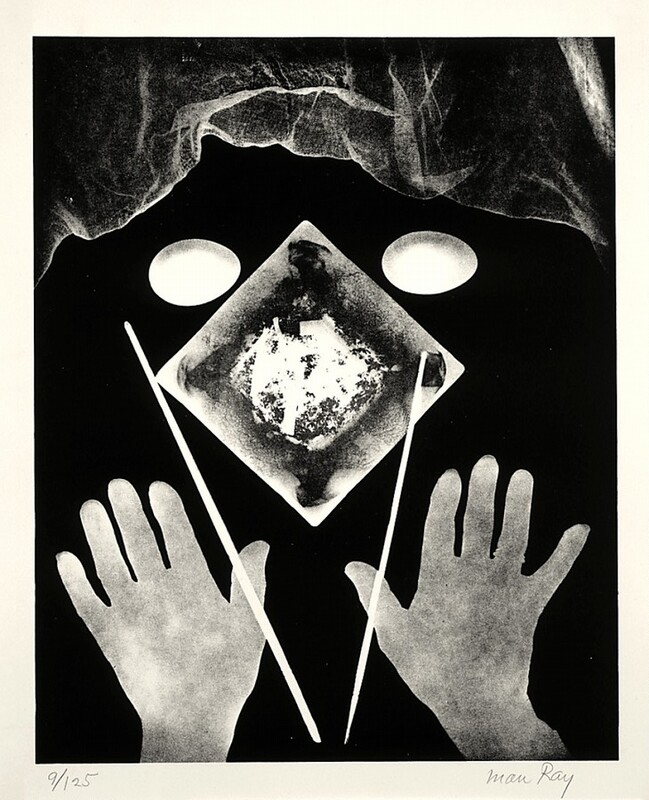
- Untitled 1966 Man Ray lithograph on Rives BFK wove paper. Printed by G.E.L. Gemini.
- Formerly: Gemini Ltd.
- Type: Privately held company
- Industry: art gallery, print workshop, arts organization
- Founded: 1966
- Founder: Rosamund Felsen; Sidney Felsen; Elyse Grinstein; Kenneth E. Tyler; Stanley Grinstein
- Headquarters: 8365 Melrose Avenue, Los Angeles, California 90069
- Number of locations: 1

Gemini G.E.L., formally Gemini Ltd., is an artists‘ workshop, exhibition space, and publisher of limited edition prints and sculptures, located at 8365 Melrose Avenue in Los Angeles, California.

== History ==
Gemini Ltd. was founded in 1965 by master printer Kenneth E. Tyler, who was an alumnus of the Tamarind Lithography Workshop (now Tamarind Institute) founded by June Wayne. Several months later, he was joined by two business partners, Sidney Felsen and Stanley Grinstein, and together they launched Gemini G.E.L. (Graphic Editions Ltd.) on January 1, 1966. The workshop has collaborated with artists such as Robert Rauschenberg, Isamu Noguchi, Robert Motherwell, Roy Lichtenstein, Julie Mehretu, Willem de Kooning, Claes Oldenburg, and Ed Ruscha, among many others, to create editioned multiples in media including lithography, etching, screenprinting, woodcut and a wide variety of sculptural materials.

In 1981, the National Gallery of Art in Washington, DC established the Gemini G.E.L. Archive, which functions as a study center for scholars and collectors, and contains a complete history of the workshop. Twenty-two artists were represented in the initial gift, including Jasper Johns, Rauschenberg, Oldenburg, David Hockney and Lichtenstein. Further gifts by donors are expected to provide a complete representation of prints published by Gemini since its founding.

== Artists who made prints at Gemini G.E.L. ==
- Josef Albers
- Richard Artschwager
- John Baldessari
- Larry Bell
- Ross Bleckner
- Jonathan Borofsky
- Cecily Brown
- Chris Burden
- Sophie Calle
- Vija Celmins
- Ron Davis
- Tacita Dean
- Richard Diebenkorn
- Frank Gehry
- Allen Ginsberg
- Robert Gober
- Joe Goode
- Philip Guston
- Ann Hamilton
- David Hammons
- Michael Heizer
- David Hockney
- Jasper Johns
- Ellsworth Kelly
- Edward Kienholz
- Roy Lichtenstein
- Man Ray
- Julie Mehretu
- Malcolm Morley
- Elizabeth Murray
- Bruce Nauman
- Isamu Noguchi
- Claes Oldenburg
- Ken Price
- Robert Rauschenberg
- James Rosenquist
- Susan Rothenberg
- Allen Ruppersberg
- Ed Ruscha
- Analia Saban
- Richard Serra
- Joel Shapiro
- Keith Sonnier
- Frank Stella
- Richard Tuttle
- Franz West
- Terry Winters
