= Henry Leroy Transtrom =

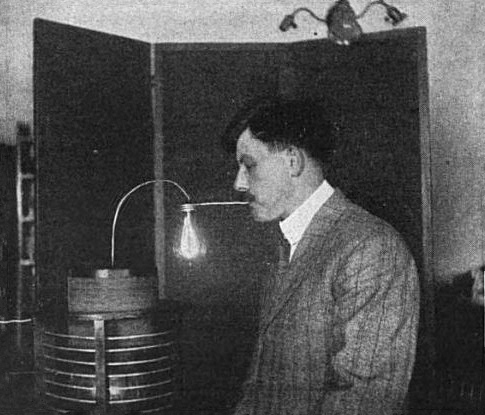
Lighting a lamp with one wire connected to a Tesla coil by holding the other in his mouth. The filament is lighted by current passing back and forth from the coil, charging and discharging his body like a capacitor plate. It is an 80 watt bulb so there is approximately 80 watts passing through his body.

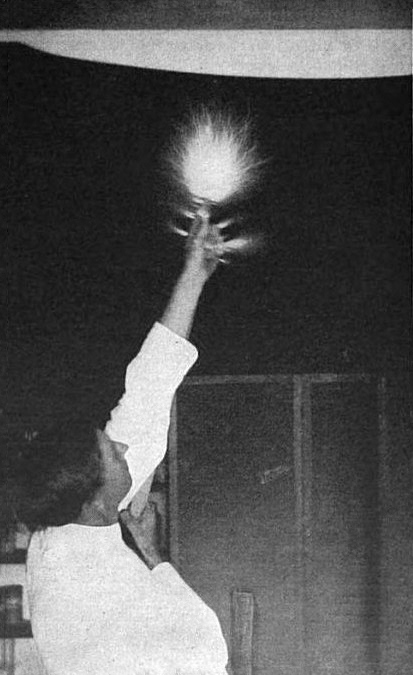
Demonstrating 10 inch (25 cm) brush discharge from hand, touching the Tesla coil with his other hand. This can cause burns on fingers, so sometimes performers wear thimbles.

Henry Leroy Transtrom (1885–1951) was an American inventor and showman who worked with high voltage electricity. His book, Electricity at High Pressures and Frequencies, (1913) is still used as a guide for constructing homemade Tesla coils.

Transtrom was best known for his dramatic stunts and performances with high frequency, high voltage electricity from a Tesla coil. For his "Lightning Man" demonstrations, he stood on a large Tesla coil which made sparks (electrical discharges) come out from his outstretched fingertips.

== Death ==
There is a long-standing rumour that Transtrom was electrocuted during one of his demonstrations when one of these long sparks reached the primary coil of the device, thus coupling and drawing enough current to kill him. No source has been found for where this rumour originated; it had been passed around among Tesla coil hobbyists for years. In 2010 a blogger received an email from Tamara Zizzo, Mr. Transtrom's great-granddaughter, stating that the story was false, and that he died from leukemia with his daughter, Edith Transtrom (Holm) at his bedside.
