= Stanley Grinstein =

American businessman and art collector (1927–2014)

Stanley Grinstein (November 26, 1927 – March 2, 2014) was an American businessman, master printer, arts collector and patron, philanthropist, and social activist.

== Early life and education ==
Stanley Grinstein was born in Seattle, Washington and attended the University of Washington. His family relocated to Los Angeles in his sophomore year and Grinstein transferred to the University of Southern California. He started a scrap metal business with his father and eventually grew a business in the selling and renting of forklifts.

== Los Angeles arts activities ==
In 1952, Grinstein married his wife, Elyse, and the two began collecting art in their home in the Brentwood section of Los Angeles.

Recognized as "the godparents of the L.A. art scene," the Grinsteins played a major role in the LA art world, from the 1960s through the early 2000s.

The Grinsteins and their company, Gemini G.E.L. (Graphic Editions Limited), helped to introduce L.A. artists to a diverse network of national and international artists and collectors, "both through their work in the studios of Gemini, and at the famed receptions and gatherings that the Grinsteins hosted at their home."

=== Gemini G.E.L. ===
Elyse and Stanley Grinstein co-founded Gemini G.E.L. with his college friend Sidney Felsen, Felsen's wife, Rosamond Felsen, and master printer, Kenneth Tyler. Gemini commissioned and produced prints, lithographs, monographs, and other art works by significant artists, including David Hockney, Ellsworth Kelly, Ed Kienholz, Roy Lichtenstein, Robert Rauschenberg, Ed Ruscha, Richard Serra, and Frank Stella.

=== Archives of American Art ===
In 2023, the family of Elyse and Stanley Grinstein donated their papers to the Smithsonian's Archives of American Art. The Grinsteins' donation includes postcards, notes, letters, photographs, and other objects from visual artists, choreographers, composers, and writers, such as Tadao Ando, Carl Andre, Michael Asher, Larry Bell, Billy Al Bengston, Wallace Berman, Daniel Buren, William S. Burroughs, James Lee Byars, Vija Celmins, Judy Chicago, Joseph Cornell, Merce Cunningham, Mark di Suvero, Frank Gehry, Allen Ginsberg, Philip Glass, Jasper Johns, Timothy Leary, Robert Rauschenberg, Richard Serra, Andy Warhol, H. C. Westermann, and Hannah Wilke.

== Personal life ==
Stanley and Elyse Grinstein (1929–2016) had three daughters: Ayn, Ellen and Nancy. In addition to being an art collector, Elyse was an architect.
