= Marijke de Goey =

Dutch visual artist

- Born: 14 April 1947 (age 79); Utrecht, Netherlands
- Education: Gerrit Rietveld Academie
- Known for: Sculpture
- Awards: Art Award Gouda, 1985; Francoise van den Bosch, 1986; Royal Degree Knight of the Order of the Dutch Lion, 2001

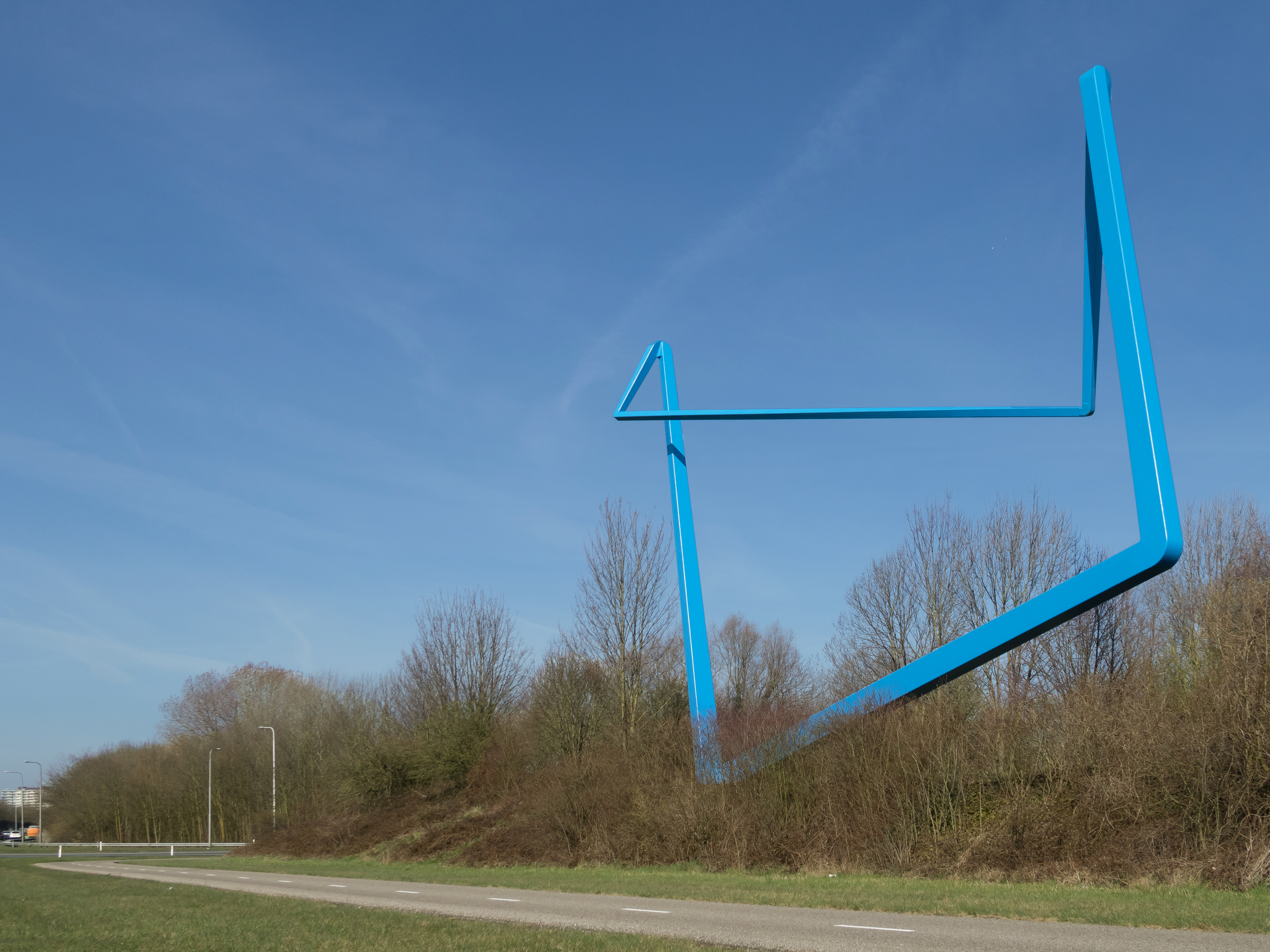
Dancing Square, Arnhem

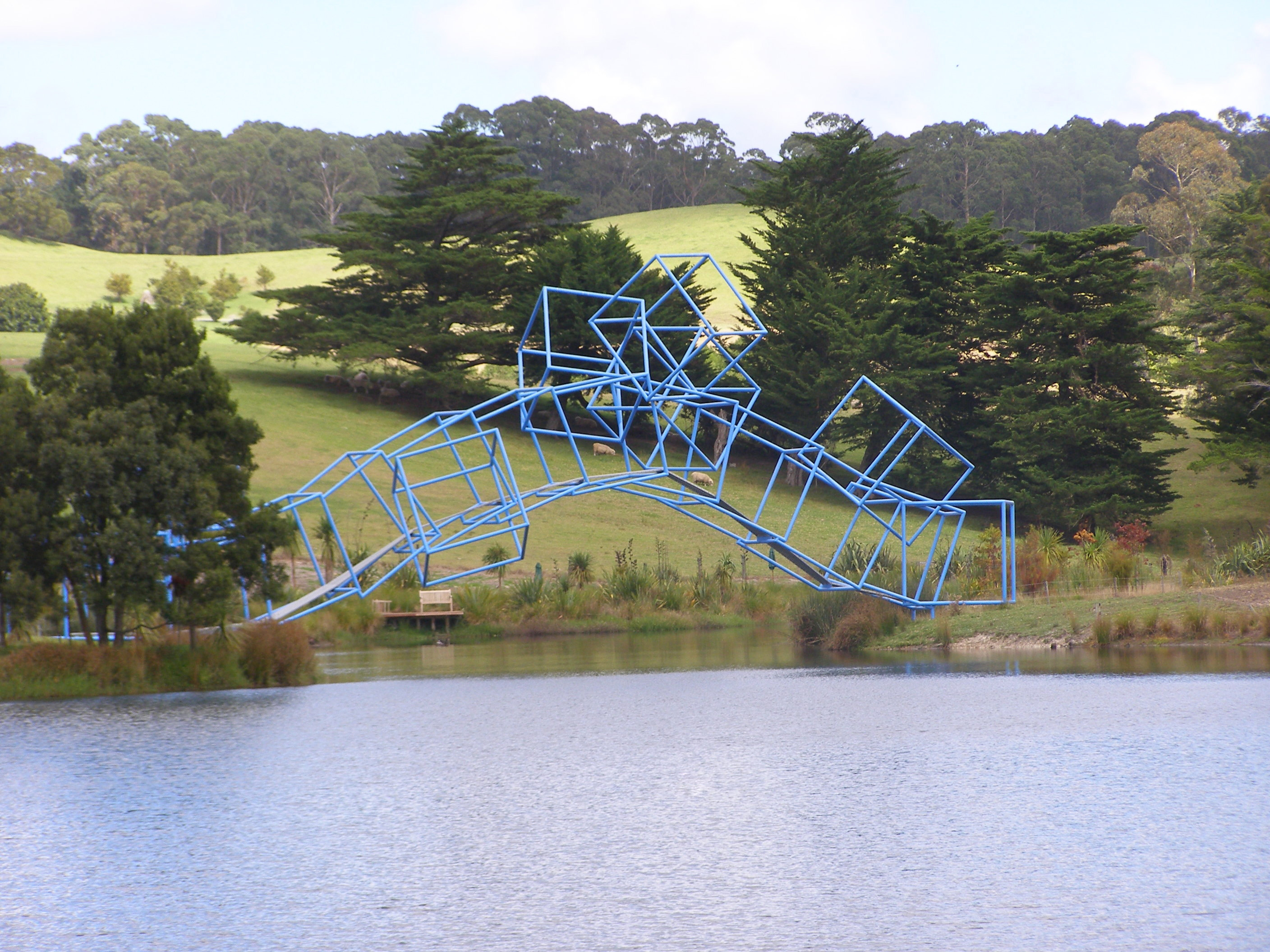
Marijke de Goey's Mermaid at Gibbs Farm, in New Zealand

Marijke de Goey (Utrecht, 14 April 1947) is a Dutch visual artist.

== Biography ==
De Goey was born in Utrecht, Netherlands and studied at the Gerrit Rietveld Academie in Amsterdam between 1974 and 1979. Her work ranges from large monumental sculptures to sculptural paintings and small table sculptures and jewellery. She has regular exhibitions all over the world.

In 1985 she received the Art Award of the City of Gouda and in 1986 she was the recipient of the Francoise van den Bosch Award, Boijmans-van Beuningen Museum, Rotterdam. In 2001 she was recognized with the Order of Orange-Nassau.

== Projects ==
Her notable projects amongst others include:

- 1987 Dancing Square, Arnhem, Netherlands
- 1992 49 Neon Secrets, Leerdam, Netherlands
- 1998 The Butterfly Orbit, Graz University of Technology, Austria
- 1999 The Mermaid sculpture for the Keystone Trust, Auckland, New Zealand, installed at Gibbs Farm
- 2000 Dragonfly Orbit, Graz University of Technology, Austria
- 2000 Cubic Gate l'Arche, Amsterdam; and Cubic Bridge, Balijbos, Pijnacker-Zoetermeer, Netherlands
- 2001 Marsupilamis sculpture, Heerlen, Netherlands
- 2002 Upbeat (in Dutch: De Opmaat) sculpture, Amsterdam, Netherlands
- 2003 Wall sculpture and two glass panels at the Royal Bank of Scotland, London, UK
- 2004 Mi casa es su casa for the City Hall of Smallingerland, Netherlands
- 2006 Acoustic sculptures, Red and Yellow, for the Faculty of Architecture, Delft University of Technology
- 2007 The Alchemist sculpture for the Faculty of Geosciences, Delft University of Technology
- 2008 Vertigo3, Technical Pavilions, Hellevoetsluis, Netherlands
- 2009 The Secret of the Nano, Van Leeuwenhoek Laboratory, Delft, Netherlands
- 2011 Reikhalzende Chandeliers, ROC Amstelveen, Netherlands

== Bibliography ==
- Schmidt, Maurits : Marijke de Goey (1997) V+K Publishing, Blaricum ISBN 9066119411
- de Goey, Marijke; Mertz, Paul; Schmidt, Maurits; Lewin, Pauline (ed.): Heartline (2001)
- de Goey, Marijke: Rake Lijnen (2011) Bergarde Galleries, Heerjansdam ISBN 9789075352931
