= Elyse Grinstein =

American architect and arts patron

Elyse Grinstein (1929 – July 2, 2016) was an American architect and art collector who lived and worked in Los Angeles. She co-founded Gemini G.E.L., an art publisher. Elyse was married to Stanley Grinstein.
