= Alan Gibbs =

New Zealand businessman

Alan Timothy Gibbs
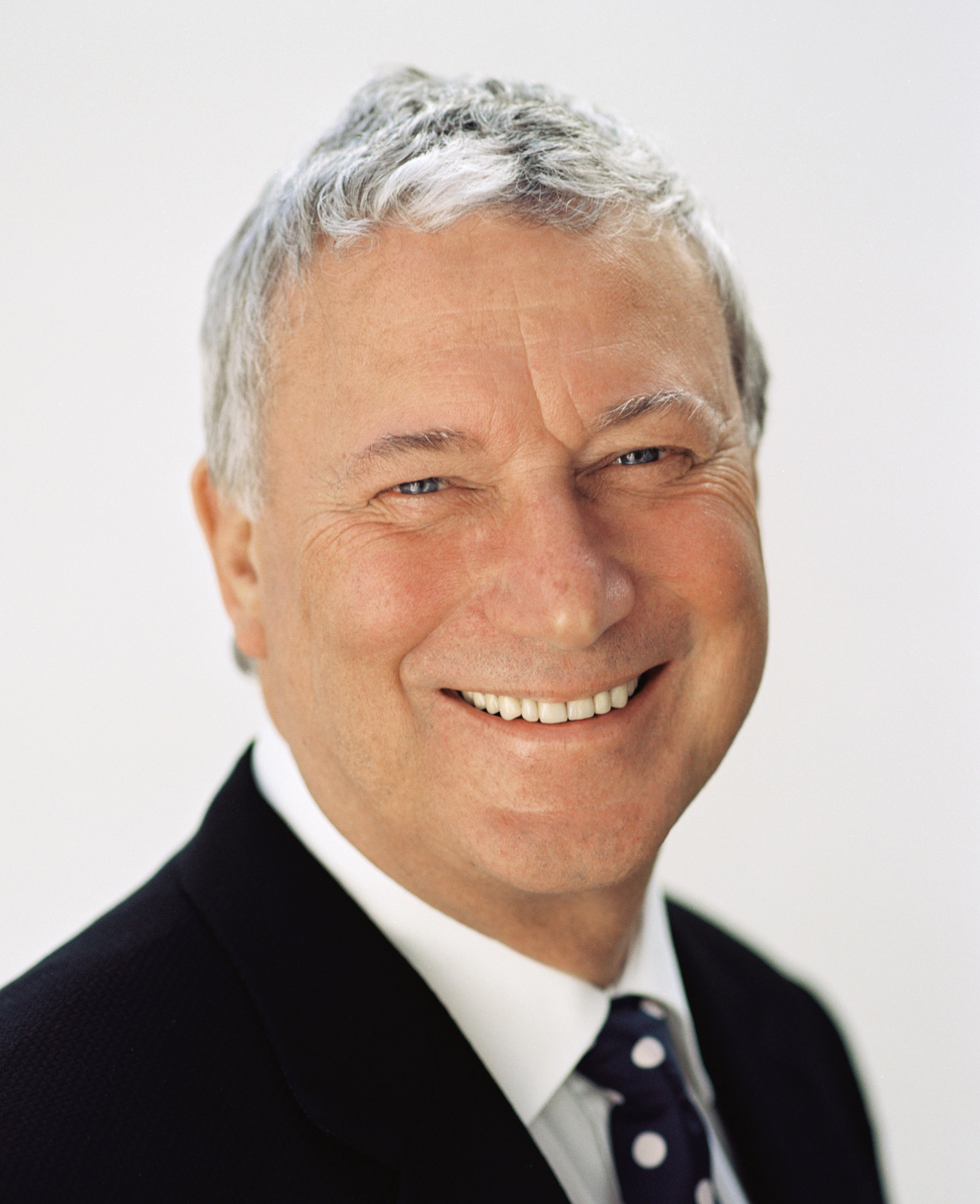
- Gibbs in 2013
- Born: 1939 (age 86–87); Christchurch, New Zealand
- Education: University of Canterbury (B.A., 1961); Victoria University of Wellington (M.A., Economics, 1962)
- Occupations: Businessman and former public servant
- Spouse: Jennifer Gore (Dame Jenny Gibbs)
- Children: 4
- Parent(s): Theodore Nisbet Gibbs; Elsie Gibbs

Alan Timothy Gibbs (born 1939) is a New Zealand-born businessman, entrepreneur and former public servant.

During the 1960s and 1970s, Gibbs was involved in manufacturing and investment banking, before overseeing the corporatisation of New Zealand's forestry sector as chair of the New Zealand Forestry Corporation during the Fourth Labour Government.

Gibbs is a founding member and major funder of the ACT Party and has been a prominent advocate of free-market reform since the 1980s.

He is the founder of Gibbs Amphibians, which produces amphibious vehicles.

== Early life ==
Alan Gibbs was born in Christchurch, the son of Theodore Nisbet Gibbs and Elsie Gibbs. His father was a businessman and active member of the National Party who chaired a Royal Commission on taxation for the First National Government.

In 1963, after graduating from university, Gibbs was employed as Third Secretary in the New Zealand High Commission in London through his father's connection to future Prime Minister Keith Holyoake. In 1965, Gibbs returned to New Zealand to work in the Prime Minister's department.

== New Zealand business career ==
From 1966 to 1970, with his brother Ian, Gibbs sought to produce New Zealand's first domestically produced car, the Anziel Nova. In the 1970s, Gibbs worked in investment banking, establishing his own firm Gibbs Securities to advise on corporate transactions. As a business person, Gibbs was involved in several high-profile investments and restructurings, including the acquisition of car dealership Tappenden Motors, the management buyout of Freightways, the privatisation of Telecom, and the founding of Sky TV.

Alan Gibbs as part of Tramco took part in a land grab in 1996, purchasing public land for $75m on Auckland's Viaduct, then overseeing its development maintaining land leasehold agreements. The leasehold agreements are a source of ongoing controversy, as rents continue to increase 90%-134% every few years, and some leasehold agreements are in perpetuity. Purchasing public land to privatise for ongoing rent extraction at unsustainable levels represents a challenge for its residents, while its land owners including Gibbs defend their "property rights". Concerns over the lack of transparency, and need for government oversight as leasehold land rents increase from 12% after 7 years in 2005, to now in excess of 100% as of 2019 and now 2026. Auckland Viaduct building owners of 10 units (8 apartments and 2 retail stores), have seen land lease/rent increase from $128,700 per year in 2005, to $337,500 per year in 2019, averaging an annual cost per unit from $12,800 to $33,750 per year. Such large rent increases continue to devalue the properties on them, where an investor sold 6 leasehold apartments for $1.8m in 2026, down from $4.2m paid in 2007. The Viaduct Harbour Holdings company owned by Gibbs, defend such increases as "30 years of sustained investment, vision, partnership and development".

== Public sector reform ==
In 1985, Gibbs was appointed to the Forestry Corporation Establishment Board, which established the New Zealand Forestry Corporation (NZFC), a state-owned enterprise, as part of the Rogernomics reforms. Gibbs oversaw the NZFC during the corporatisation of New Zealand's forestry assets, which resulted in over 3,000 public sector forestry employees being made redundant in 1987. In 1989, the Forestry Corporation's plantation forests were privatised.

Gibbs also advised the Fourth Labour Government on restructuring the public health and welfare systems.

== Political advocacy ==
As a university student, Gibbs was a self-described proponent of "market socialism", and started the New Left Club at Canterbury University. However, he later adopted a neo-liberal ideology after becoming more involved in business.

During the Fourth Labour Government, Gibbs was an active member of the Business Roundtable and a strong supporter of Roger Douglas. He established a New Zealand branch of libertarian think-tank the Centre for Independent Studies and was involved in the establishment of the ACT Party.

In 2014, the New Zealand Herald reported that Gibbs gave $100,000 to the ACT Party each election year. During a speech to the ACT Party conference that year, Gibbs advocated privatising all of New Zealand's schools, hospitals and roads.

His daughter, Debbi Gibbs, is chairperson of the Atlas Network, a libertarian think tank.

== Art and sculpture collection at Gibbs Farm ==
In 1991, Gibbs began building a sculpture park on the 1,000 acres (4.0 km^{2}) of land on Gibbs Farm. The property is on Kaipara Harbour on New Zealand's North Island.

Today. Gibbs Farm includes works of art by Daniel Buren, Neil Dawson, Marijke de Goey, Andy Goldsworthy, Anish Kapoor, George Rickey, Richard Serra and Bernar Venet.

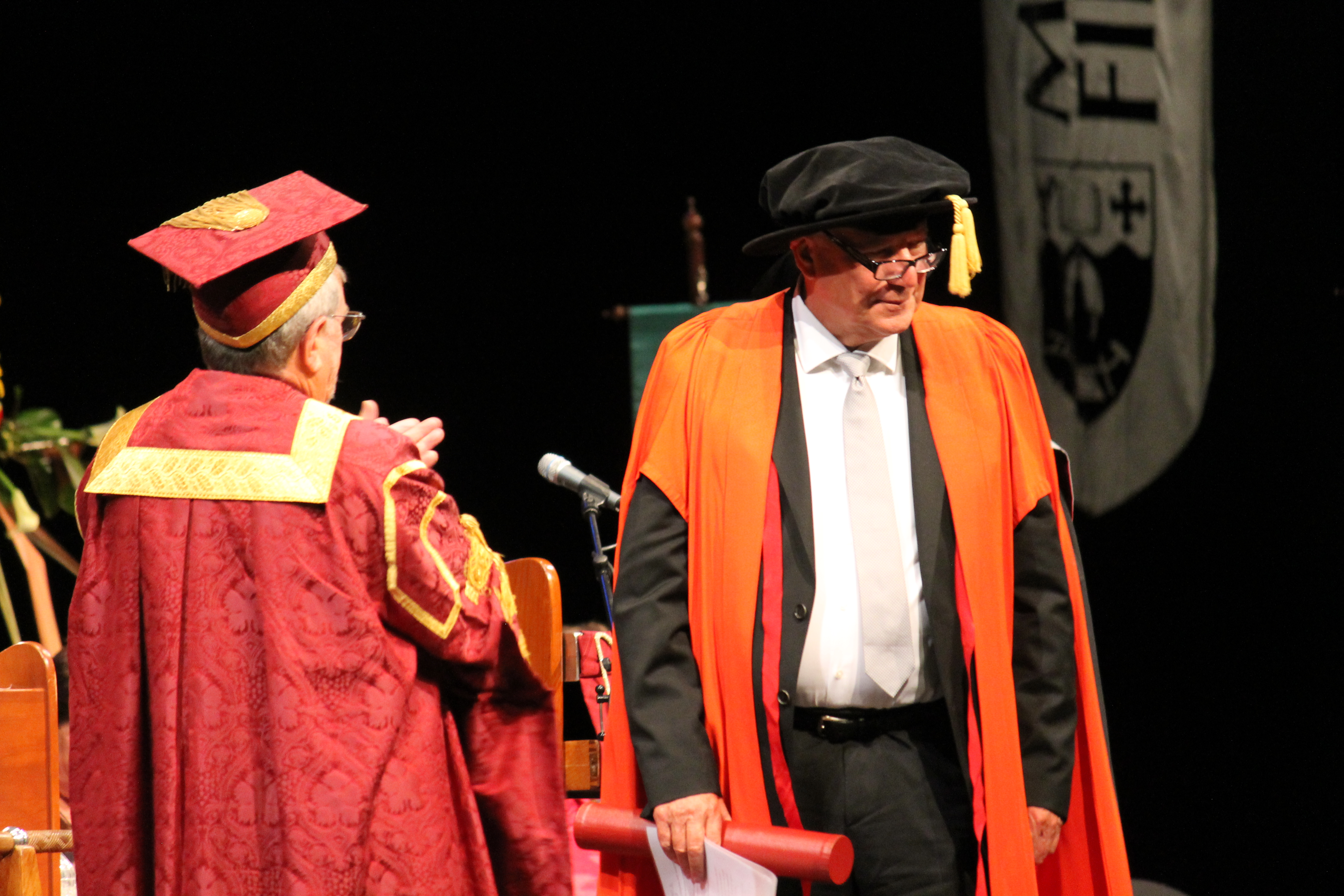
Gibbs receiving an honorary doctorate from University of Canterbury Chancellor John Wood in April 2014

== Honours and awards ==
In 2018, Gibbs was inducted into the New Zealand Business Hall of Fame. He was awarded an honorary doctorate from the University of Canterbury in 2014.

== Books and media ==
- "Seeing the Landscape: Richard Serra's Te Tuhirangi Contour", documentary film by Alberta Chu, 2003.
- "New Form at the Farm: Anish Kapoor's Dismemberment Site 1", documentary film by Alberta Chu, 2010.
- Serious Fun: The Life and Times of Alan Gibbs by Paul Goldsmith; ebook; Random House New Zealand; 3 August 2012; ASIN B008P61LU4, ISBN 9781869799304
