= List of painters in the Los Angeles County Museum of Art collections =

The List of painters in the Los Angeles County Museum of Art collections is a list of the artists indexed in the Los Angeles County Museum of Art website whose works in their collection were painted. The museum's collections are spread throughout several locations in Los Angeles, and not all works are on display. The entire collection houses over 120,000 objects, thousands of which are on view at any given time, and only 1,676 of these are paintings. In the following list, the painter's name is followed by the number of their paintings in the collection, with a link to all of their works available on the LACMA website. For artists with more than one type of work in the collection, or for works by artists not listed here, see the LACMA website or the corresponding Wikimedia Commons category. Of artists listed, less than 10% are women. For the complete list of artists and their artworks in the collection, see the website.

== A ==
- Pieter Coecke van Aelst (1502–1550), 1 painting : LACMA
- Juan Francisco de Aguilera (1671–?), 1 painting : LACMA
- Josef Albers (1888–1976), 4 paintings : LACMA
- Lita Albuquerque (b.1946), 8 paintings : LACMA
- Martha Joanne Alf (1930–2019), 2 paintings : LACMA
- Alessandro Allori (1535–1607), 1 painting : LACMA
- Carlos Almaraz (1941–1989), 2 paintings : LACMA
- John Altoon (1925–1969), 2 paintings : LACMA
- Mabel Alvarez (1891–1985), 1 painting : LACMA
- Fereydoun Ave (b.1945), 2 paintings: LACMA
- Francis Alÿs (b.1959), 2 paintings : LACMA
- Eleanor Antin (b.1935), 1 painting : LACMA
- Gioacchino Assereto (1600–1649), 1 painting : LACMA
- Hendrick Avercamp (1585–1634), 1 painting : LACMA
- Ayad Alkadhi (b.1971), 1 painting : LACMA

== B ==
- Joseph Badger (c.1707–1765), 1 painting : LACMA
- Derick Baegert (1476–1515), 1 painting : LACMA
- Jo Baer (b.1929), 2 paintings : LACMA
- Giovanni Baglione (1566–1643), 1 painting : LACMA
- Baisao (1675–1763), 1 painting (calligraphy) : LACMA
- Jules de Balincourt (b.1972), 1 painting : LACMA
- Banjin Dōtan (1698–1775), 1 painting : LACMA
- Fra Bartolomeo (1472–1517), 1 painting : LACMA
- Luis Arenal Bastar (1909–1985), 2 paintings : LACMA
- Max Beckmann (1884–1950), 1 painting : LACMA
- José Bedia (b.1959), 1 painting : LACMA
- Larry Bell (b.1939), 3 paintings : LACMA
- Jacopo Bellini (1400–1471), 1 painting : LACMA
- George Bellows (1882–1925), 3 paintings : LACMA
- Billy Al Bengston (b.1934), 3 paintings : LACMA
- Karl Benjamin (1925–2012), 2 paintings : LACMA
- Tony Berlant (b.1941), 1 painting : LACMA
- Sven Berlin (1911–1999), 2 paintings : LACMA
- Pedro Berruguete (1450–1504), 1 painting : LACMA
- Jean-Victor Bertin (1767–1842), 1 painting : LACMA
- Linda Besemer (b.1957), 1 painting : LACMA
- Edward Biberman (1904–1986), 3 paintings : LACMA
- Neri di Bicci (1418–1492), 1 painting : LACMA
- Francesco Bissolo (c.1470–1554), 1 painting : LACMA
- Joseph Blackburn (painter) (1700–c.1778), 2 paintings : LACMA
- Streeter Blair (1888–1966), 2 paintings : LACMA
- Ralph Albert Blakelock (1847–1919), 1 painting : LACMA
- Jan Frans van Bloemen (1662–1749), 2 paintings : LACMA
- Jan Boeckhorst (1604–1688), 1 painting : LACMA
- Louis-Léopold Boilly (1761–1845), 2 paintings : LACMA
- Guy Pène du Bois (1884–1958), 2 paintings : LACMA
- Hans Bol (1534–1593), 1 painting : LACMA
- Paris Bordone (1500–1571), 1 painting : LACMA
- Michaël Borremans (b.1963), 1 painting : LACMA
- Anthonie van Borssom (1631–1677), 1 painting : LACMA
- Ambrosius Bosschaert (1573–1621), 1 painting : LACMA
- François Boucher (1703–1770), 6 paintings : LACMA
- Aelbrecht Bouts (1451–1549), 1 painting : LACMA
- Georges Braque (1882–1963), 3 paintings : LACMA
- Victor Brauner (1903–1966), 2 paintings : LACMA
- Salomon de Bray (1597–1664), 1 painting : LACMA
- Dirck de Bray (1635–1694), 2 paintings : LACMA
- Nicolas-Guy Brenet (1728–1792), 2 paintings : LACMA
- Moretto da Brescia (ca. 1498–1554), 1 painting : LACMA
- Alfred Thompson Bricher (1837–1908), 2 paintings : LACMA
- Jan Brueghel the Elder (1568–1624), 1 painting : LACMA
- Barthel Bruyn the Elder (1493–1553), 1 painting : LACMA
- Linda Burnham (b.1950), 1 painting : LACMA
- Yosa Buson (1716–1783), 1 painting : LACMA
- Byeon Sangbyeok (18th Century), 1 painting : LACMA

== C ==
- Jan van de Cappelle (1626–1679), 1 painting : LACMA
- Gregory Card (b.1945), 2 paintings : LACMA
- Eugène Carrière (1849–1906), 2 paintings : LACMA
- John Carroll (1892–1959), 2 paintings : LACMA
- Mary Cassatt (1844–1926), 2 paintings : LACMA
- Giovanni Benedetto Castiglione (1609–1664), 1 painting : LACMA
- Elise Cavanna (1902–1963), 10 paintings : LACMA
- Enrique Martinez Celaya (b.1964), 1 painting : LACMA
- Paul Cézanne (1839–1906), 3 paintings : LACMA
- Enrique Chagoya (b.1953), 1 painting : LACMA
- Jean Charlot (1898–1979), 7 paintings : LACMA
- William Merritt Chase (1849–1916), 3 paintings : LACMA
- Chen Shaomei (1901–1954), 1 painting : LACMA
- Cheng Zhengkui (c.1604–1670), 1 painting : LACMA
- Chi-Chien Wang (1907–2003), 2 paintings : LACMA
- William Christenberry (1936–2016), 1 painting : LACMA
- Petrus Christus (1415–1476), 1 painting : LACMA
- James Goodwyn Clonney (1812–1867), 1 painting : LACMA
- Boyd Clopton (1935–1989), 5 paintings : LACMA
- Thomas Cole (1801–1848), 2 paintings : LACMA
- Robert Colescott (1925–2009), 3 paintings : LACMA
- Cima da Conegliano (ca. 1459–1517/18), 1 painting : LACMA
- Ron Cooper (b.1943), 2 paintings : LACMA
- Adriaen Coorte (1660–1707), 1 painting : LACMA
- John Singleton Copley (1738–1815), 2 paintings : LACMA
- Jean-Baptiste-Camille Corot (1796–1875), 2 paintings : LACMA
- Juan Correa (1646–1716), 1 painting : LACMA
- Antonio da Correggio (1489–1534), 1 painting : LACMA
- Mary Corse (b.1945), 2 paintings : LACMA
- Pietro da Cortona (1596–1669), 1 painting : LACMA
- Jasper Francis Cropsey (1823–1900), 2 paintings : LACMA
- Aelbert Cuyp (1620–1691), 2 paintings : LACMA

== D ==
- Daidō Bunka (1680–1752), 2 paintings : LACMA
- Daishin Gitō (1657–1730), 1 painting : LACMA
- Dario di Giovanni (1420–1495), 1 painting : LACMA
- Charles-François Daubigny (1817–1878), 3 paintings : LACMA
- Arthur Bowen Davies (1862–1928), 2 paintings : LACMA
- Ronald Davis (b.1937), 2 paintings : LACMA
- Deiryū Kutsu (1895–1954), 2 paintings : LACMA
- Eugène Delacroix (1798–1863), 2 paintings : LACMA
- Alexandre-François Desportes (1661–1743), 1 painting : LACMA
- Narcisse Virgilio Díaz (1807–1876), 2 paintings : LACMA
- Richard Diebenkorn (1922–1993), 2 paintings : LACMA
- Abraham van Diepenbeeck (1596–1675), 1 painting : LACMA
- Dietmar Lutz (b.1968), 1 painting : LACMA
- Kim Dingle (b.1951), 2 paintings : LACMA
- Gaspare Diziani (1689–1767), 1 painting : LACMA
- Tomory Dodge (b.1974), 1 painting : LACMA
- Kaye Donachie (b.1970), 1 painting : LACMA
- Roy Dowell (b.1951), 1 painting : LACMA
- Jean Dubuffet (1901–1985), 2 paintings : LACMA
- Marlene Dumas (b.1953), 1 painting : LACMA

== E ==
- Thomas Eakins (1844–1916), 2 paintings : LACMA
- Jack Earl (b.1934), 1 painting : LACMA
- Tim Ebner (b.1953), 3 paintings : LACMA
- Jacob Eichholtz (1776–1842), 2 paintings : LACMA
- Nicolás Enríquez (1704–1790), 2 paintings : LACMA
- Antonio de Espinosa (17th Century), 6 paintings : LACMA
- Eto Reigen (1721–1785), 1 painting : LACMA
- Edgar Ewing (1913–2006), 2 paintings : LACMA

== F ==
- Fei Danxu (1801–1850), 1 painting : LACMA
- Lorser Feitelson (1898–1978), 2 paintings : LACMA
- Chris Finley (b.1971), 1 painting : LACMA
- Rosso Fiorentino (1494–1541), 1 painting : LACMA
- Lavinia Fontana (1552–1614), 1 painting : LACMA
- Jean-Louis Forain (1852–1931), 2 paintings : LACMA
- Helen Forbes (1891–1945), 1 painting : LACMA
- Llyn Foulkes (b.1934), 3 paintings : LACMA
- Sam Francis (1923–1994), 3 paintings : LACMA
- Alexander Fraser (1827–1899), 1 painting : LACMA
- Bartolo di Fredi (ca. 1330–ca. 1410), 2 paintings : LACMA
- Pedro Friedeberg (b.1936), 3 paintings : LACMA
- Pia Fries (b.1955), 1 painting : LACMA
- Fūgai Ekun (1568–c.1654), 4 paintings : LACMA
- Fūgai Honkō (1779–1847), 1 painting : LACMA
- Fukyū (18th Century), 1 painting : LACMA
- Charlotte Eustace Sophie de Fuligny-Damas (1741–1828), 1 painting : LACMA

== G ==
- Gai Qi (1774–1829), 1 painting : LACMA
- Gajin Fujita (b.1972), 1 painting : LACMA
- Louis Galloche (1670–1761), 2 paintings : LACMA
- Ubaldo Gandolfi (1728–1781), 2 paintings : LACMA
- Gang Jinhui (1851–1919), 1 painting : LACMA
- Juan GarcÍa (b.1959), 2 paintings : LACMA
- Jedd Garet (b.1955), 1 painting : LACMA
- Paul Gauguin (1848–1903), 4 paintings : LACMA
- Geiai (fl.1550–1600), 1 painting : LACMA
- Don Silvestro dei Gherarducci (1339–1399), 1 painting : LACMA
- Giovanni di Paolo (1403–1482), 1 painting : LACMA
- Lawrence Gipe (b.1962), 1 painting : LACMA
- Joe Goode (b.1937), 2 paintings : LACMA
- Mary Ann Goodman (?), 2 paintings : LACMA
- Arshile Gorky (1904–1948), 5 paintings : LACMA
- Goshun (1752–1811), 1 painting : LACMA
- Adolph Gottlieb (1903–1974), 2 paintings : LACMA
- Jan van Goyen (1596–1656), 2 paintings : LACMA
- John R. Grabach (1886–1981), 2 paintings : LACMA
- Morris Graves (1910–2001), 2 paintings : LACMA
- El Greco (1541–1614), 1 painting : LACMA
- Mark Grotjahn (b.1968), 1 painting : LACMA
- Guo Dawei (1919–2003), 1 painting : LACMA
- Philip Guston (1913–1980), 2 paintings : LACMA
- Felipe Santiago Gutiérrez (1824–1904), 1 painting : LACMA

== H ==
- Hakuin Ekaku (1685–1768), 9 paintings : LACMA
- Noël Hallé (1711–1781), 1 painting : LACMA
- Frans Hals (1582–1666), 2 paintings : LACMA
- Hanabusa Itchō (1652–1724), 1 painting : LACMA 1 attributed : LACMA
- Marc Handelman (b.1975), 1 painting : LACMA
- Armin Carl Hansen (1886–1957), 1 painting : LACMA
- Sophie Harpe (1895–1981), 2 paintings : LACMA
- Marsden Hartley (1877–1943), 1 painting : LACMA
- Childe Hassam (1859–1935), 3 paintings : LACMA
- Tim Hawkinson (b.1960), 1 painting : LACMA
- Jan Davidsz. de Heem (1606–1683), 2 paintings : LACMA
- Sophie von Hellermann (b.1975), 1 painting : LACMA
- Robert Henri (1865–1929), 3 paintings : LACMA
- Boza Hessova (1889–1981), 2 paintings : LACMA
- Hirafuku Hyakusui (1877–1933), 1 painting : LACMA
- Meindert Hobbema (1638–1709), 2 paintings : LACMA
- David Hockney (b.1937), 2 paintings : LACMA
- Hans Hofmann (1880–1966), 2 paintings : LACMA
- Hans Holbein the Younger (1497–1543), 1 painting : LACMA
- Winslow Homer (1836–1910), 2 paintings : LACMA
- Hōsai (18th Century), 2 paintings : LACMA
- Hosoda Eishi (1756–1829), 1 painting : LACMA
- Huang Binhong (1865–1955), 3 paintings : LACMA
- Darcy Huebler (b.1957), 1 painting : LACMA
- William Morris Hunt (1824–1879), 2 paintings : LACMA

== I ==
- Inka Essenhigh (b.1969), 1 painting : LACMA
- Henry Inman (1801–1846), 2 paintings : LACMA
- George Inness (1825–1894), 2 paintings : LACMA
- Adriaen Isenbrandt (1485–1551), 1 painting : LACMA
- Iten Sōsei (1472–1554), 2 paintings : LACMA
- Itō Jakuchū (1716–1800), 2 paintings : LACMA

== J ==
- James Jarvaise (1924–2015), 2 paintings : LACMA
- John Wesley Jarvis (1780–1840), 2 paintings : LACMA
- Alexej von Jawlensky (1864–1941), 2 paintings : LACMA
- Jayateja (15th Century), 1 painting : LACMA
- Neil Jenney (b.1945), 2 paintings : LACMA
- Judy Bally Jensen (b.1953), 1 painting : LACMA
- Ynez Johnston (1920–2019), 2 paintings : LACMA
- Ludolf Leendertsz de Jongh (1616–1679), 1 painting : LACMA
- Raymond Jonson (1891–1982), 2 paintings : LACMA
- Juan Rodríguez Juárez (1675–1728), 1 painting : LACMA

== K ==
- Willem Kalf (1619–1693), 1 painting : LACMA
- Kameda Bōsai (1752–1826), 2 paintings : LACMA
- Kamisaka Sekka (1866–1942), 3 paintings : LACMA
- Wassily Kandinsky (1866–1944), 2 paintings : LACMA
- Kano Eishin (1613–1685), 1 painting : LACMA
- Kano Masunobu (1625–1694), 2 paintings : LACMA
- Kano Naonobu (1607–1650), 1 painting : LACMA
- Kanō Tan'yū (1602–1674), 1 painting : LACMA 1 attributed: LACMA
- Kawanabe Kyōsai (1831–1889), 27 paintings : LACMA
- Kawanabe Kyōsai (attributed), 9 paintings : LACMA
- Keishū Itaya (1729–1797), 1 painting : LACMA
- William Keith (1838–1911), 2 paintings : LACMA
- Ellsworth Kelly (1923–2015), 2 paintings : LACMA
- Habib Kheradyar (b.1958), 1 painting : LACMA
- Kim Chin'u (19th Century), 1 painting : LACMA
- Kim Giyeop (late 19th–early 20th Centuries), 1 painting : LACMA
- Kim Hongdo (1745–c.1806/14), 1 painting : LACMA
- Ernst Ludwig Kirchner (1880–1938), 4 paintings : LACMA
- R. B. Kitaj (1932–2007), 1 painting : LACMA
- Kitamuki Unchiku (1623–1703), 1 painting : LACMA
- Paul Klee (1879–1940), 2 paintings : LACMA
- Kō Sūkoku (1730–1804), 3 paintings : LACMA
- Kobayashi Kiyochika (1847–1915), 1 painting : LACMA
- Kobayashi Kokei (1883–1957), 1 painting : LACMA
- Koen van den (b.1973), 1 painting : LACMA
- Komai Ki (1747–1797), 1 painting : LACMA
- Philips Koninck (1619–1688), 2 paintings : LACMA
- Emil Jean Kosa (1903–1968), 2 paintings : LACMA
- Guillermo Kuitca (b.1961), 1 painting : LACMA
- František Kupka (1871–1957), 2 paintings : LACMA
- Kusumi Morikage (c.1620–1690), 1 painting : LACMA
- Kuwabara Kōnan (1906–1988), 1 painting : LACMA

== L ==
- Louis Lafitte (1770–1828), 1 painting : LACMA
- Wifredo Lam (1902–1982), 1 painting : LACMA
- Fitz Henry Lane (1804–1865), 2 paintings : LACMA
- Jérôme-Martin Langlois (1779–1838), 1 painting : LACMA
- Jonathan Lasker (b.1948), 1 painting : LACMA
- Paul Lauritz (1889–1975), 2 paintings : LACMA
- Fernand Léger (1881–1955), 3 paintings : LACMA
- François Lemoyne (1688–1737), 1 painting : LACMA
- John Lessore (b.1939), 1 painting : LACMA
- Roy Lichtenstein (1923–1997), 2 paintings : LACMA
- Charles-André van Loo (1705–1765), 2 paintings : LACMA
- Vicente López y Portaña (1772–1850), 1 painting : LACMA
- Anthonie de Lorme (1610–1673), 1 painting : LACMA
- Morris Louis (1912–1962), 3 paintings : LACMA
- Jorg Lozek (b.1971), 1 painting : LACMA
- Luca di Tommè (1356–1389), 2 paintings : LACMA
- Gilbert Lujan (1940–2011), 1 painting : LACMA
- George Luks (1867–1933), 2 paintings : LACMA
- Helen Lundeberg (1908–1999), 4 paintings : LACMA

== M ==
- Master of the Bargello Tondo (1400–1450), 1 painting : LACMA
- Master of the Legend of St. Ursula (Bruges) (1436–1505), 1 painting : LACMA
- Master of the Female Half-Lengths (fl.1530–1540), 1 painting : LACMA
- Master of the Fiesole Epiphany (fl.1475–1496), 1 painting : LACMA
- Master of the Legend of Saint Lucy (fl.1480–1510), 1 painting : LACMA
- Master of Osma (16th Century), 1 painting : LACMA
- Stanton Macdonald-Wright (1890–1973), 2 paintings : LACMA
- Marcin Maciejowski (b.1974), 1 painting : LACMA
- Alessandro Magnasco (1667–1749), 2 paintings : LACMA
- René Magritte (1898–1967), 2 paintings : LACMA
- Man Ray (1890–1976), 2 paintings : LACMA
- Jan Mandijn (1500–1560), 1 painting : LACMA
- Rutilio di Lorenzo Manetti (1571–1639), 1 painting : LACMA
- Edward Middleton Manigault (1877–1922), 1 painting : LACMA
- Rocco Marconi (?–1529), 1 painting : LACMA
- Kerry James Marshall (b.1955), 1 painting : LACMA
- Maruyama Ōkyo (1733–1795), 5 paintings : LACMA 1 attributed : LACMA
- Maruyama Ōshin (1790–1838), 1 painting : LACMA
- Maruyama Ōzui (1766–1829), 1 painting : LACMA
- Andrés Marzal de Sas (fl.1393–1410), 1 painting : LACMA
- Quentin Matsys (1466–1530), 1 painting : LACMA
- Roberto Matta (1911–2002), 2 paintings : LACMA
- Jan Matulka (1890–1972), 2 paintings : LACMA
- Keith Mayerson (b.1966), 1 painting : LACMA
- Pier Francesco Mazzucchelli (1573–1625), 1 painting : LACMA
- Evelyn McCormick (1869–1948), 1 painting : LACMA
- Henry Lee McFee (1886–1953), 2 paintings : LACMA
- Barry McGee (b.1966), 1 painting : LACMA
- Kelly McLane (b.1968), 1 painting : LACMA
- John McLaughlin (1898–1976), 3 paintings : LACMA
- Sirak Melkonian (b. 1930), 2 works: LACMA
- Sandra Mendelsohn Rubin (b.1947), 2 paintings : LACMA
- Carlos Mérida (1891–1985), 4 paintings : LACMA
- Knud Merrild (1894–1954), 3 paintings : LACMA
- Gerhard Merz (b.1947), 1 painting : LACMA
- Frans van Mieris the Younger (1689–1763), 1 painting : LACMA
- John Millei (b.1958), 1 painting : LACMA
- Jean-François Millet (1814–1875), 2 paintings : LACMA
- Joan Miró (1893–1983), 2 paintings : LACMA
- Amedeo Modigliani (1884–1920), 2 paintings : LACMA
- Louise Moillon (1609–1696), 1 painting : LACMA
- Isaac Moillon (1614–1673), 1 painting : LACMA
- Claude Monet (1840–1926), 3 paintings : LACMA
- Juan Patricio Morlete Ruiz (1713–1772), 6 paintings : LACMA
- Ed Moses (1926–2018), 2 paintings : LACMA
- Robert Motherwell (1915–1991), 2 paintings : LACMA
- Lee Mullican (1919–1998), 2 paintings : LACMA
- Matt Mullican (b.1951), 3 paintings : LACMA
- Munakata Shikō (1903–1975), 2 paintings : LACMA

== N ==
- Nagasawa Rosetsu (1754–1799), 2 paintings : LACMA
- Nakabayashi Chikkei (1816–1867), 2 paintings : LACMA
- Nakabayashi Chikutō (1776–1853), 2 paintings : LACMA
- Nakahara Nantenbō (1839–1925), 7 paintings : LACMA
- Nakamura Hōchū (?–1819), 2 paintings : LACMA
- Nanzan Kōryō (1756–1839), 3 paintings : LACMA
- Nasser Al Salem (b.1984), 1 painting : LACMA
- Robert Natkin (1930–2010), 2 paintings : LACMA
- David Neal (1838–1915), 1 painting : LACMA
- Aert van der Neer (1603–1677), 1 painting : LACMA

== O ==
- Obaku Taihō (1691–1774), 2 paintings : LACMA
- Ogata Kōrin (1658–1716), 1 painting : LACMA
- Pablo O'Higgins (1904–1983), 2 paintings : LACMA
- Okada Beisanjin (1744–1820), 1 painting : LACMA
- Okada Hankō (1782–1846), 2 paintings : LACMA
- Okamoto Jōen (1628–1673), 1 painting : LACMA
- Okamoto Shūki (1807–1862), 5 paintings : LACMA
- Okamoto Toyohiko (1773–1845), 1 painting : LACMA
- Margit Omar (b.1941), 2 paintings : LACMA
- Gordon Onslow Ford (1912–2003), 2 paintings : LACMA
- José Clemente Orozco (1883–1949), 1 painting : LACMA
- Ōtagaki Rengetsu (1791–1875), 2 paintings : LACMA
- Ōtsuki Bankei (1801–1878), 1 painting : LACMA
- Sabina Ott (1955–2018), 1 painting : LACMA
- Laura Owens (b.1970), 1 painting : LACMA

== P ==
- José de Páez (1720–1790), 2 paintings : LACMA
- Pan Simu (1756–1839), 4 paintings : LACMA
- Joseph Parrocel (1646–1704), 2 paintings : LACMA
- Jean-Baptiste Pater (1695–1736), 1 painting : LACMA
- Edgar Alwin Payne (1882–1947), 1 painting : LACMA
- Rembrandt Peale (1778–1860), 2 paintings : LACMA
- Max Pechstein (1881–1955), 3 paintings : LACMA
- Antonio Francesco Peruzzini (1643–1724), 1 painting : LACMA
- Paolo Piazza (1557–1621), 1 painting : LACMA
- Giovanni Battista Piazzetta (1682–1754), 1 painting : LACMA
- Pablo Picasso (1881–1973), 4 paintings : LACMA
- Camille Pissarro (1830–1903), 4 paintings : LACMA
- Giambattista Pittoni (1687–1767), 1 paintings : LACMA
- Giacomo del Po (1652–1726), 2 paintings : LACMA
- Jan Polack (ca. 1450–1519), 1 painting : LACMA
- Jan Porcellis (1584–1632), 1 painting : LACMA
- Frans Post (1612–1680), 1 painting : LACMA
- Richard Pousette-Dart (1916–1992), 2 paintings : LACMA
- Melville Price (1920–1970), 1 painting : LACMA
- Monique Prieto (b.1962), 1 painting : LACMA
- Mitsuko Aoyama (1874–1941), 1 painting : LACMA
- Adam Pynacker (1622–1673), 1 painting : LACMA

== Q ==
- Qi Feng (19th Century), 1 painting : LACMA

== R ==
- Tarlan Rafiee (b.1980), 11 paintings :LACMA
- David Ratcliff (b.1970), 1 painting : LACMA
- Michael Reafsnyder (b.1969), 1 painting : LACMA
- Granville Redmond (1871–1935), 2 paintings : LACMA
- Rembrandt (1606–1669), 3 paintings : LACMA
- Pierre-Auguste Renoir (1841–1919), 2 paintings : LACMA
- Jean-Bernard Restout (1732–1797), 3 paintings : LACMA
- Jean Restout the Younger (1692–1768), 1 painting : LACMA
- Joshua Reynolds (1723–1792), 1 painting : LACMA
- Guido Reni (1575–1642), 2 paintings : LACMA
- Sebastiano Ricci (1659–1734), 2 paintings : LACMA
- John Hubbard Rich (1876–1954), 2 paintings : LACMA
- Louis Ritman (1889–1963), 1 painting : LACMA
- Diego Rivera (1886–1957), 2 paintings : LACMA
- Johann Martin von Rohden (1778–1868), 1 painting : LACMA
- Ruth Root (b.1967), 1 painting : LACMA
- Martinus Rørbye (1803–1878), 2 paintings : LACMA
- Salvator Rosa (1615–1673), 2 paintings : LACMA
- Salvator Rosa (1615–1673), 2 paintings : LACMA
- Bernardo Rossellino (1409–1464), 1 painting : LACMA
- Georges Rouault (1871–1958), 2 paintings : LACMA
- Théodore Rousseau (1812–1867), 2 paintings : LACMA
- Peter Paul Rubens (1577–1640), 2 paintings : LACMA
- Jacob Isaacksz van Ruisdael (1628–1682), 3 paintings : LACMA
- Salomon van Ruysdael (1602–1670), 3 paintings : LACMA
- Ruocheng Zhang (1722–1770), 1 painting : LACMA
- Edward Ruscha (b.1937), 2 paintings : LACMA
- Anne Ryan (1889–1954), 2 paintings : LACMA

== S ==
- Jacques Sablet (1749–1803), 3 paintings : LACMA
- Pieter Jansz. Saenredam (1597–1665), 1 painting : LACMA
- Jean-Pierre Saint-Ours (1752–1809), 2 paintings : LACMA
- Sakai Hōitsu (1761–1828), 37 paintings : LACMA
- Sakaki Hyakusen (1697–1753), 2 paintings : LACMA
- Sakamoto Kojo (1875–1969), 1 painting : LACMA
- Yashar Samimi Mofakham (b.1979), 11 paintings :LACMA
- Sandeep Mukherjee (b.1964), 2 paintings : LACMA
- John Singer Sargent (1856–1925), 3 paintings : LACMA
- Rolph Scarlett (1889–1984), 1 painting : LACMA
- Ary Scheffer (1795–1858), 2 paintings : LACMA
- Christoph Schmidberger (b.1974), 1 painting : LACMA
- Dana Schutz (b.1976), 1 painting : LACMA
- Sekkan (fl.1555–1558), 1 painting : LACMA
- Sen Sōshitsu XV (1923–2025), 1 painting : LACMA
- Sengai Gibon (1750–1837), 2 paintings : LACMA
- Sesshū Tōyō (1420–1506), 1 painting : LACMA
- Sesson Shūkei (c.1504–c.1590), 2 paintings : LACMA
- Millard Sheets (1907–1989), 2 paintings : LACMA
- Kate Shepherd (b.1961), 1 painting : LACMA
- Shibata Zeshin (1807–1891), 2 paintings : LACMA
- Shikibu Terutada (16th Century), 1 painting : LACMA
- Henrietta Shore (1880–1963), 2 paintings : LACMA
- Shōrin (late 15th–early 16th Century), 1 painting : LACMA
- Shunsō Shōjū (1751–1839), 2 paintings : LACMA
- Jangarh Singh Shyam (1962–2001), 1 painting : LACMA
- Venkat Shyam (b.1970), 1 painting : LACMA
- Sim Sajong (1707–1769), 1 painting : LACMA
- David Alfaro Siqueiros (1896–1974), 4 paintings : LACMA
- Allen Smith Jr. (1810–1890), 2 paintings : LACMA
- Josh Smith (b.1976), 1 painting : LACMA
- Soga Shōhaku (1730–1781), 4 paintings : LACMA
- Soga Shōhaku (attributed), 2 paintings : LACMA
- Sōhō Takuan (1573–1645), 1 painting : LACMA
- Sōkan (16th Century), 1 painting : LACMA
- Sokhwan Ch'oe (1808–?), 1 painting : LACMA
- Mori Sosen (1747–1821), 2 paintings : LACMA
- Chaïm Soutine (1893–1943), 2 paintings : LACMA
- Moses Soyer (1899–1974), 2 paintings : LACMA
- Eugene Speicher (1883–1962), 2 paintings : LACMA
- Frederick Randolph Spencer (1806–1875), 2 paintings : LACMA
- Theodoros Stamos (1922–1997), 2 paintings : LACMA
- Gherardo Starnina (1354–1409), 2 paintings : LACMA
- Frank Stella (b.1936), 5 paintings : LACMA
- Will Henry Stevens (1881–1949), 1 painting : LACMA
- Pierre Subleyras (1699–1749), 2 paintings : LACMA
- Thomas Sully (1783–1872), 2 paintings : LACMA
- Elza Sunderland (1903–1991), 18 paintings : LACMA
- Suzuki Kiitsu (1796–1858), 2 paintings : LACMA

== T ==
- Tai Hsi (1801–1860), 11 paintings : LACMA
- Taikan Monju (1766–1842), 2 paintings : LACMA
- Takada Keiho (1674–1755), 1 painting : LACMA
- Mori Takamasa (1791–1864), 1 painting : LACMA
- Rufino Tamayo (1899–1991), 9 paintings : LACMA
- Tang Guanyu (20th Century), 1 painting : LACMA
- Henry Ossawa Tanner (1859–1937), 2 paintings : LACMA
- Tanomura Chikuden (1777–1835), 1 painting : LACMA
- Tanzio da Varallo (ca. 1580–ca. 1632), 1 painting : LACMA
- Nicolas Antoine Taunay (1755–1830), 1 painting : LACMA
- Henry Taylor (b.1958), 2 paintings : LACMA
- David Teniers the Younger (1610–1690), 3 paintings : LACMA
- Tenryūdōjin (1718–1810), 1 painting : LACMA
- Mori Tessan (1775–1841), 1 painting : LACMA
- Abbott Handerson Thayer (1849–1921), 1 painting : LACMA
- Giovanni Battista Tiepolo (1696–1770), 1 painting : LACMA
- Tintoretto (1518–1594), 1 painting : LACMA
- Titian (1485–1576), 1 painting : LACMA
- Mark Tobey (1890–1976), 2 paintings : LACMA
- Bartolomeo di Tommaso (active 1425–1454), 1 painting : LACMA
- Tōrei Enji (1721–1792), 3 paintings : LACMA
- Tosa Mitsunori (1583–1638), 1 painting : LACMA
- Jean François de Troy (1679–1752), 2 paintings : LACMA
- Tsubaki Chinzan (1801–1854), 1 painting : LACMA
- Tsukioka Sessai (1770–1839), 1 painting : LACMA 1 attributed : LACMA
- Tsukioka Yoshitoshi (1839–1892), 1 painting : LACMA
- Luc Tuymans (b.1958), 1 painting : LACMA

== U ==
- Ugolino di Nerio (1295–1347), 1 painting : LACMA

== V ==
- Pierre-Henri de Valenciennes (1750–1819), 1 painting : LACMA
- Valentin de Boulogne (1591–1632), 1 painting : LACMA
- Jeffrey Vallance (b.1955), 2 paintings : LACMA
- Alison Van Pelt (b.1963), 1 painting : LACMA
- Victor Vasarely (1908–1997), 2 paintings : LACMA
- Giorgio Vasari (1511–1574), 1 painting : LACMA
- Chris Vasell (b.1974), 1 painting : LACMA
- Elihu Vedder (1836–1923), 2 paintings : LACMA
- Otto van Veen (1556–1629), 1 painting : LACMA
- Adriaen van de Velde (1636–1672), 2 paintings : LACMA
- Willem van de Velde the Younger (1633–1707), 2 paintings : LACMA
- Paolo Veneziano (before 1300–ca. 1360), 1 painting : LACMA
- Paolo Veronese (1528–1588), 2 paintings : LACMA
- Maurice de Vlaminck (1876–1958), 2 paintings : LACMA
- Simon de Vlieger (1600–1653), 1 painting : LACMA
- Simon Vouet (1590–1649), 3 paintings : LACMA
- Simon Vouet (1590–1649), 3 paintings : LACMA
- Édouard Vuillard (1868–1940), 4 paintings : LACMA

== W ==
- Andy Warhol (1928–1987), 4 paintings : LACMA
- Shōtei Watanabe (1851–1918), 7 paintings : LACMA
- Watanabe Shikō (1683–1755), 6 paintings : LACMA
- Darren Waterston (b.1965), 1 painting : LACMA
- Frederick Judd Waugh (1861–1940), 2 paintings : LACMA
- J. Alden Weir (1852–1919), 2 paintings : LACMA
- Julie Weiss, 1 painting : LACMA
- Wen Ding (1766–1852), 4 paintings : LACMA
- Wen Zhengming (1470–1559), 1 painting : LACMA
- William Wendt (1865–1946), 3 paintings : LACMA
- Francis Wheatley (1747–1801), 2 paintings : LACMA
- Orrin Augustine White (1883–1969), 1 painting : LACMA
- Kehinde Wiley (b.1977), 1 painting : LACMA
- Emanuel de Witte (1617–1692), 2 paintings : LACMA
- Emerson Woelffer (1914–2003), 2 paintings : LACMA
- Joachim Wtewael (1566–1638), 1 painting : LACMA
- Alexander Helwig Wyant (1836–1892), 2 paintings : LACMA

== X ==
- Xiao Yuncong (1596–1673), 1 painting : LACMA
- Xie Jin (1747–1819), 1 painting : LACMA

== Y ==
- Yamaguchi Sekkei (1644/48–1732), 1 painting : LACMA
- Yamaguchi Soken (1759–1818), 2 paintings : LACMA
- Yamaoka Beika (1868–1914), 1 painting : LACMA
- Yanagisawa Kien (1706–1758), 1 painting : LACMA
- Yayoi Kusama (1929–2026), 1 painting : LACMA
- Yek (b.1968), 1 painting : LACMA
- Yi Jaegwan (1783–1837), 1 painting : LACMA
- Yōgetsu (15th Century), 1 painting : LACMA
- Yokoi Kinkoku (1761–1832), 3 paintings : LACMA
- Yong Sin, 1 painting : LACMA
- Yonggwan Ch'oe (17th Century), 1 painting : LACMA
- Yu Youren (1879–1964), 1 painting : LACMA
- Yuan Jiang (c.1671–c.1746), 2 paintings : LACMA
- Yuan Yao (18th Century), 1 painting : LACMA

== Z ==
- Norman Zammitt (1931–2007), 2 paintings : LACMA
- Zhang Haiying (b.1972), 1 painting : LACMA
- Zhang Huan (b.1965), 1 painting : LACMA
- Zhou Zhimian (16th Century), 1 painting : LACMA
- Marco Zoppo (1433–1478), 1 painting : LACMA
