= San Polo (church) =

Church in Venice, Italy

Coordinates: 45°26′13.4″N 12°19′47.0″E

Church of San Polo
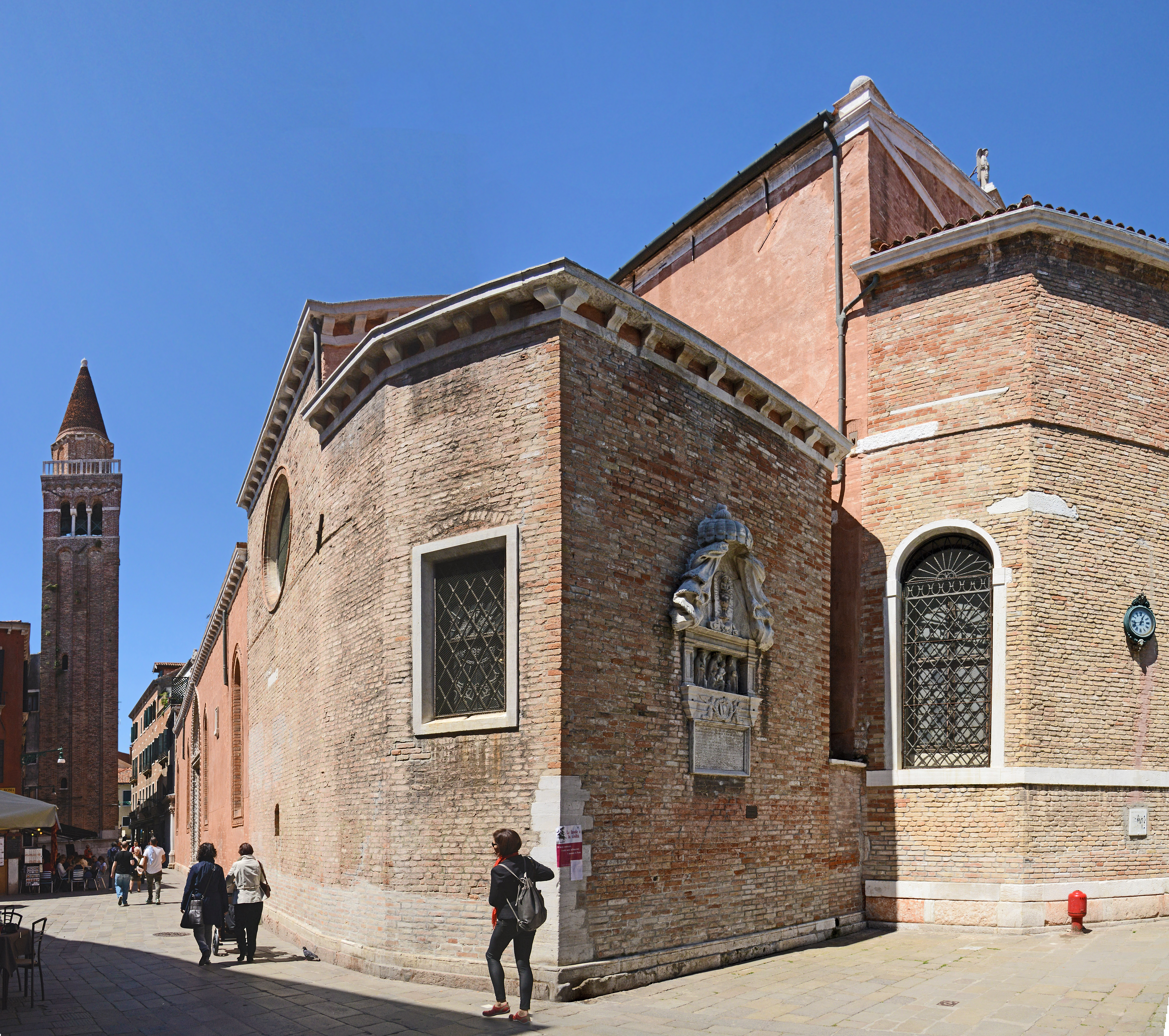
- Southern side with bell tower

- Location within Venice Location within Italy

Religion
- Affiliation: Roman Catholic
- Province: Venice

Location
- Location: Venice, Italy

Architecture
- Type: Church
- Style: Gothic
- Completed: 15th century

The Chiesa di San Polo is a Catholic church in Venice, dedicated to the Apostle Paul. It gives its name to the San Polo sestiere of the city.

== Exterior ==
The current Gothic church dates from the 15th century, but a church has stood on the site since the 9th century and the south doorway, possibly by Bartolomeo Bon, survives from this church. The campanile, standing detached from the church, was built in 1362.

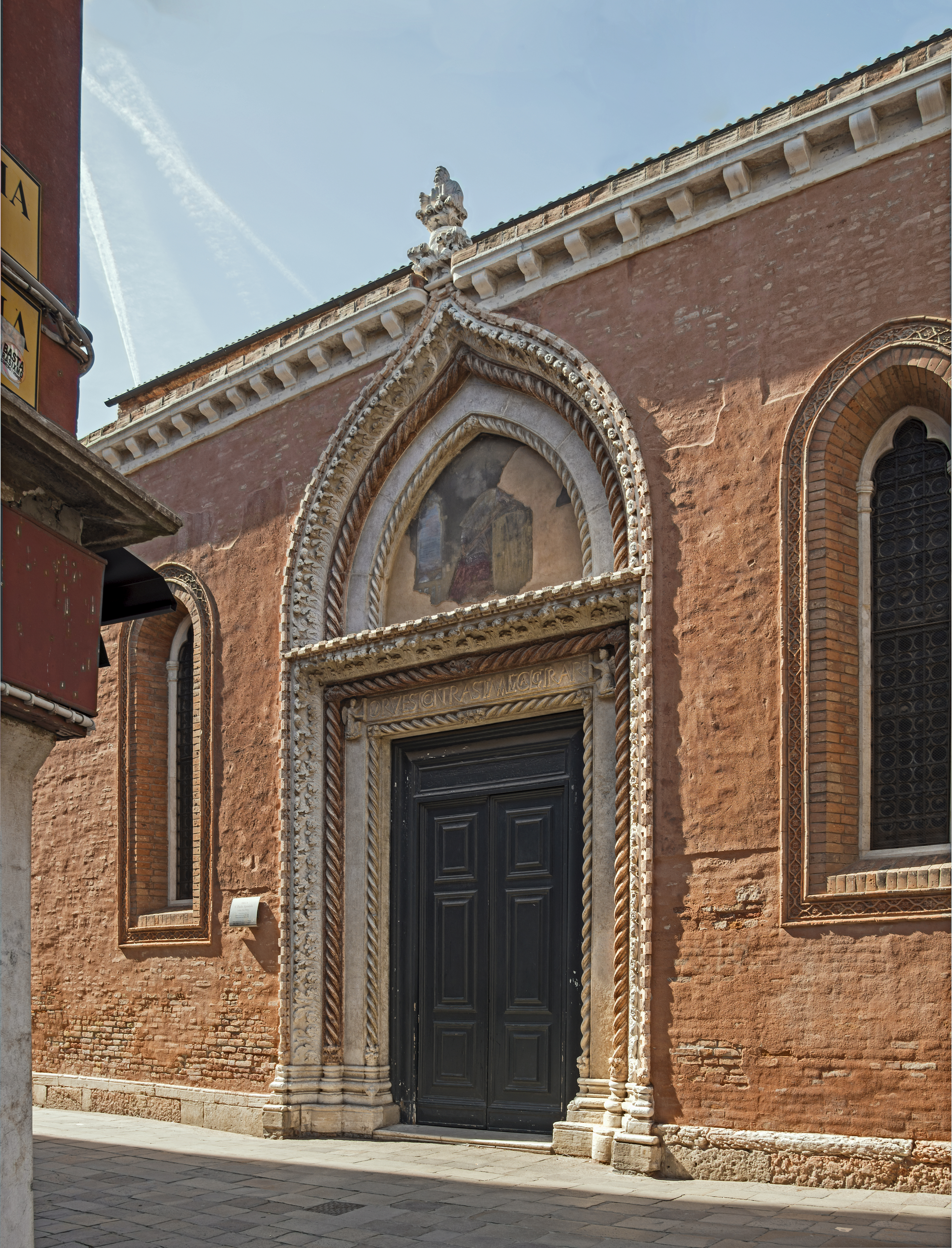
The Gothic gate on the Salita San Polo.

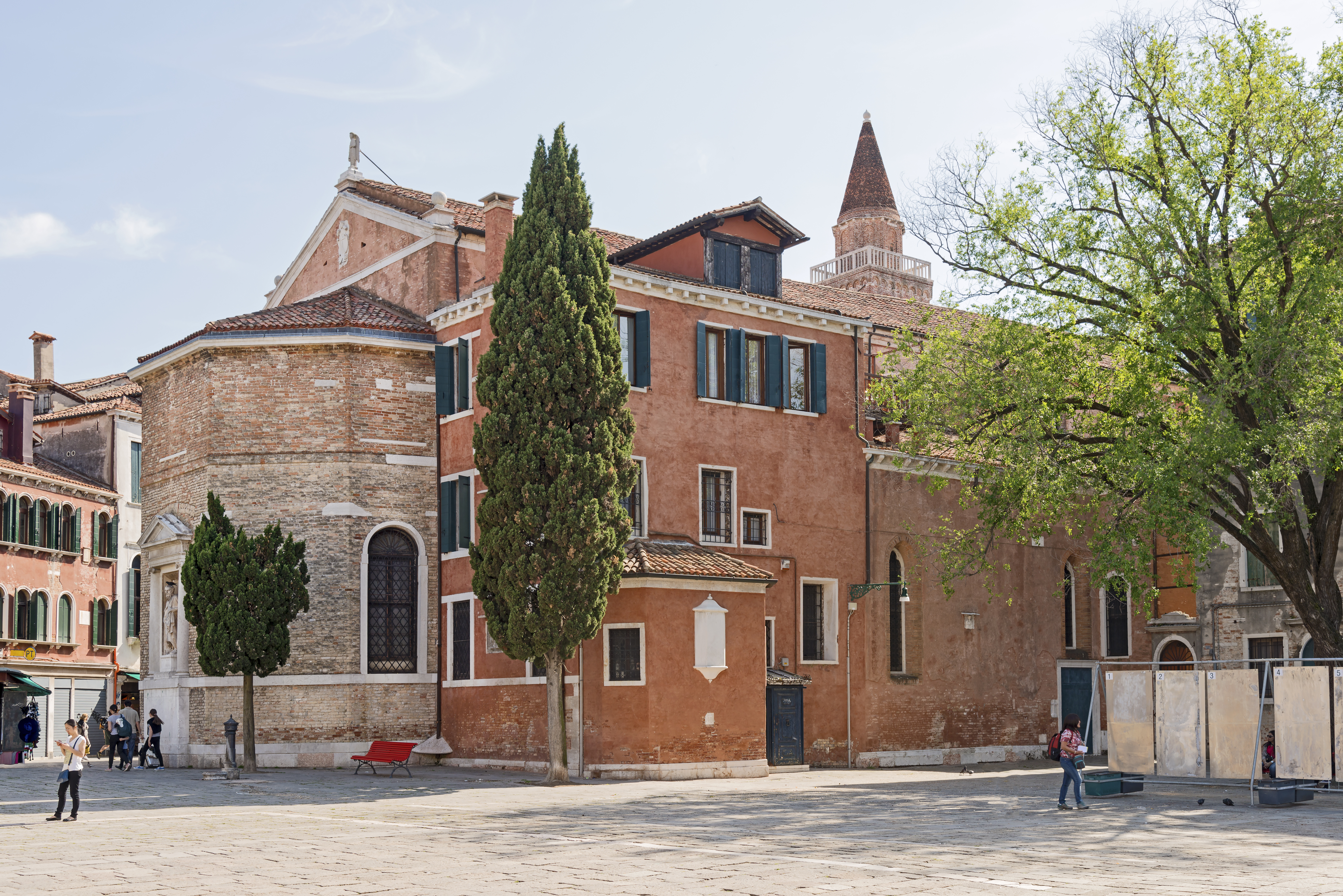
the apse

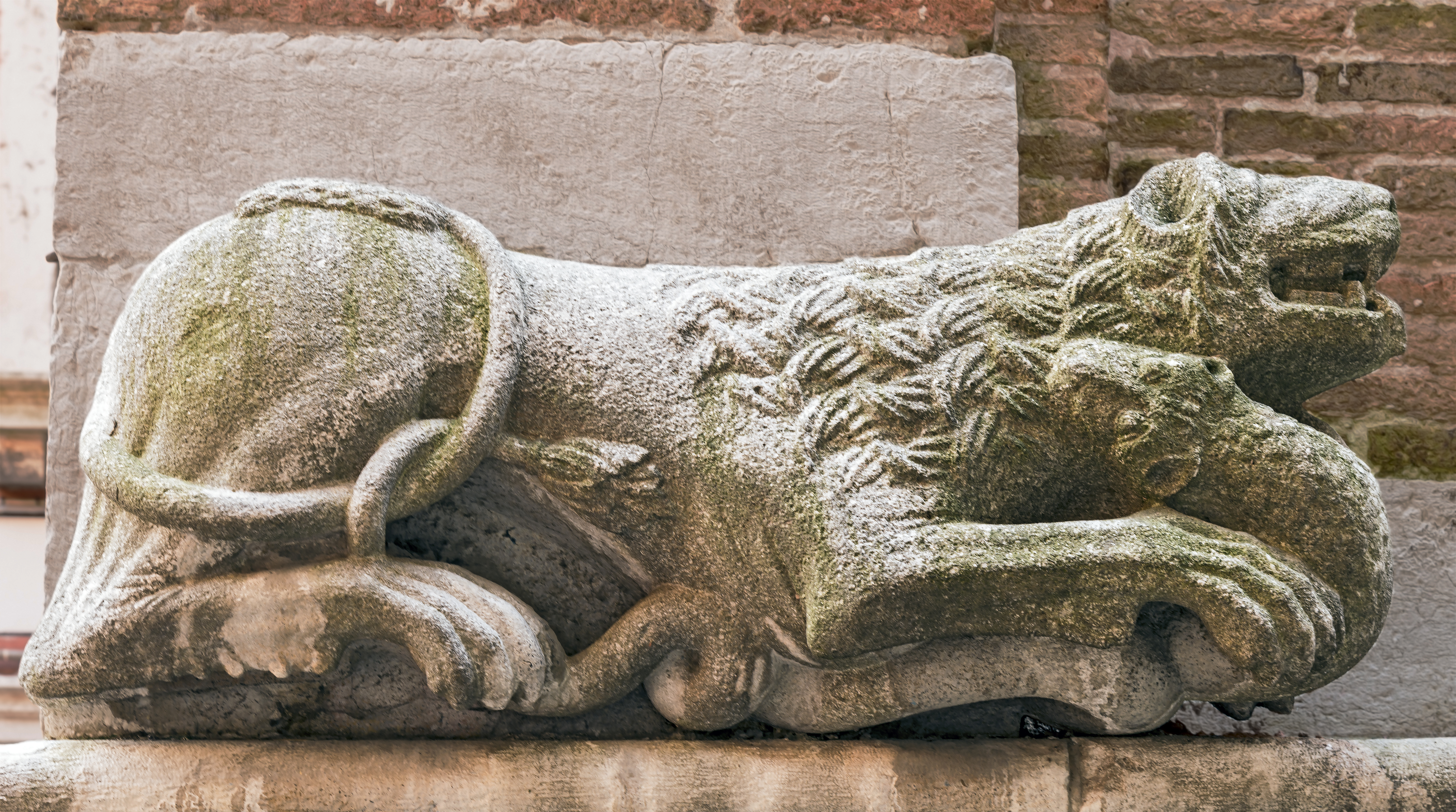
Lion (left), twelfth century, base of campanile

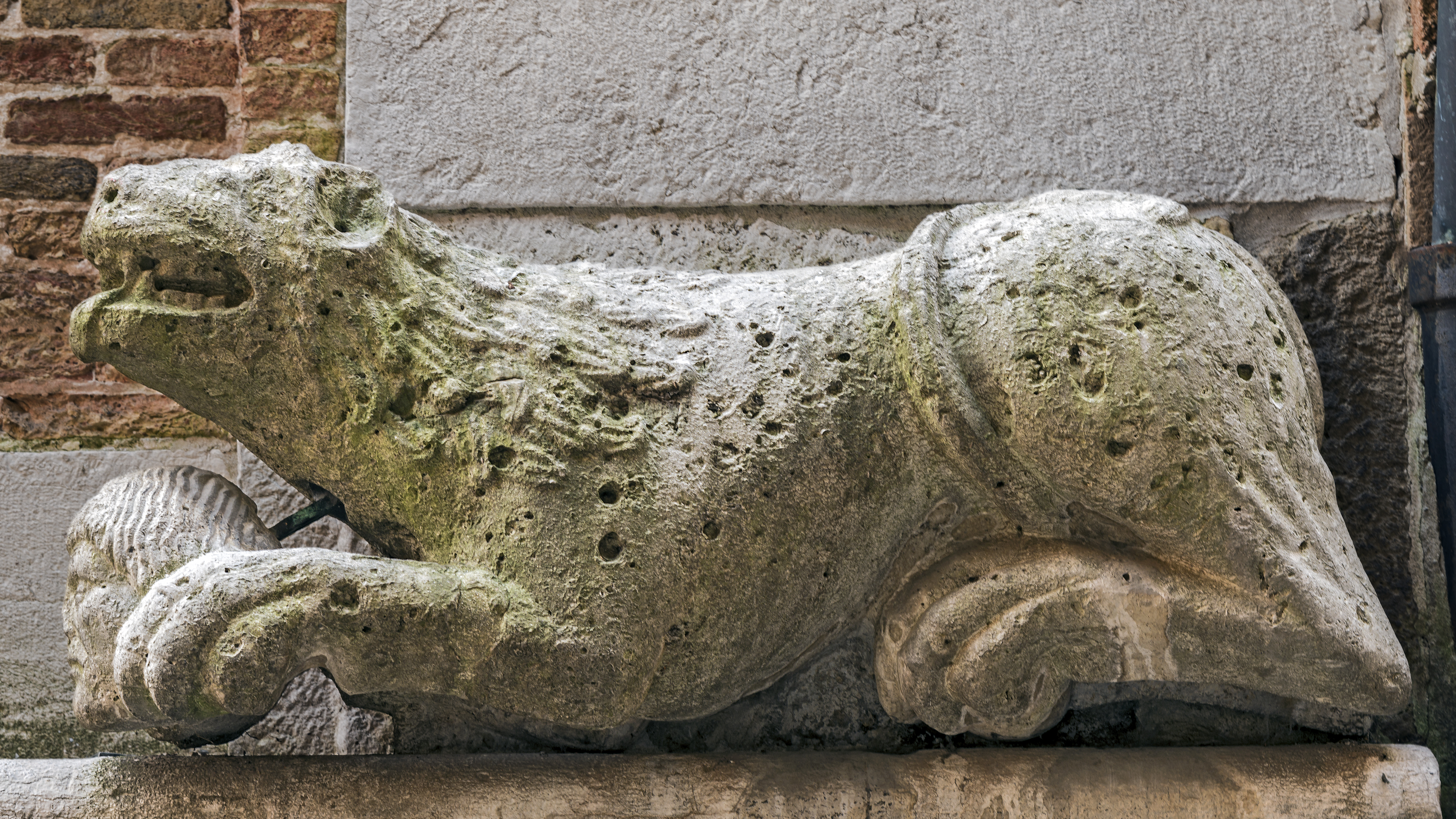
Lion (right), twelfth century, base of campanile

== Interior ==
The interior has a ship's keel roof and was restored in 1804 by Davide Rossi. On the left wall near the entrance is a Last Supper by Jacopo Tintoretto, while the first altarpiece on the left, is attributed to his studio. Other walls have canvases by Paolo Piazza (St Silvester baptizes Emperor Constantine and St Paul Preaching; by Jacopo Guarana (Sacred Heart).

The altar of the absidal chapel on the left has a Marriage of the Virgin by Paolo Veronese. The presbytery has canvases by Palma il Giovane including St Peter and the Keys, the St Paul at Tarsus, and a Temptation of St Anthony Abbot). Next to the altar are two bronze statues by Alessandro Vittoria:St Paul and St Anthony Abbot.

Among the ceiling paintings are a Glory of Angels and Resurrection by Giandomenico Tiepolo. His father, Giambattista is thought to be the author of Virgin appears to St John Nepomuk, commissioned by the King of Poland, August III.

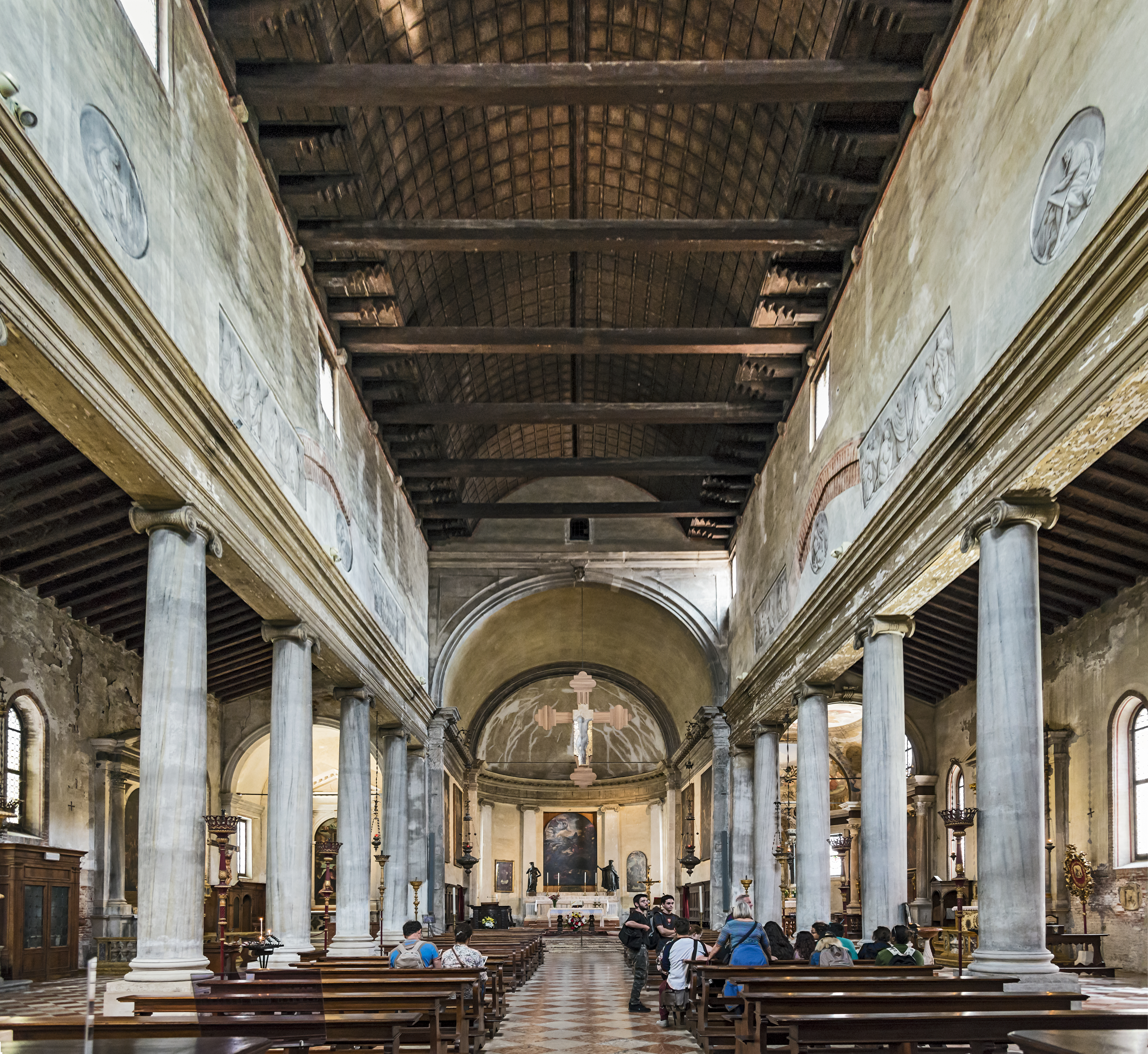
View of nave

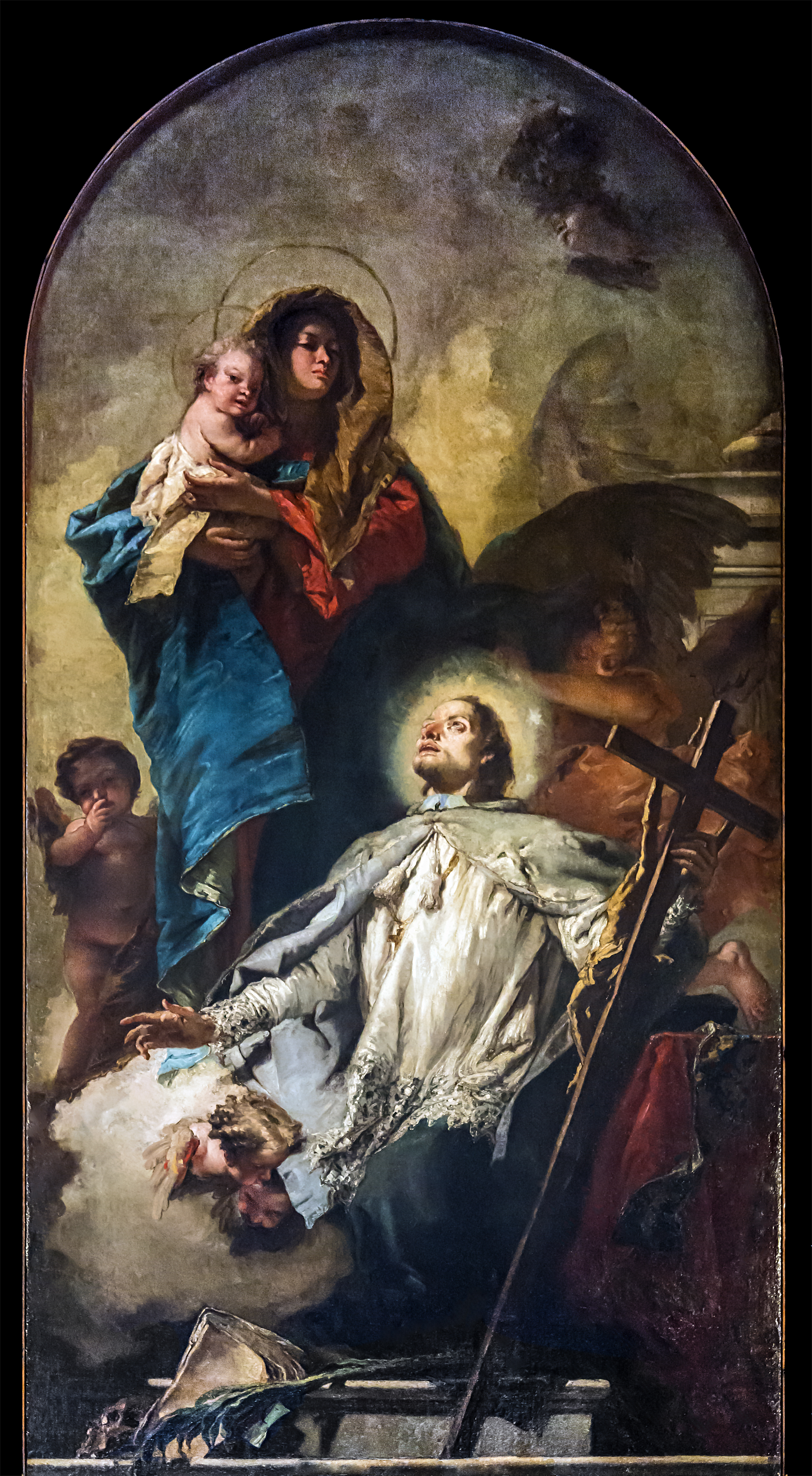
The Virgin appears to St John of Nepomuk by Giambattista Tiepolo

== Oratory of the Crucifix ==
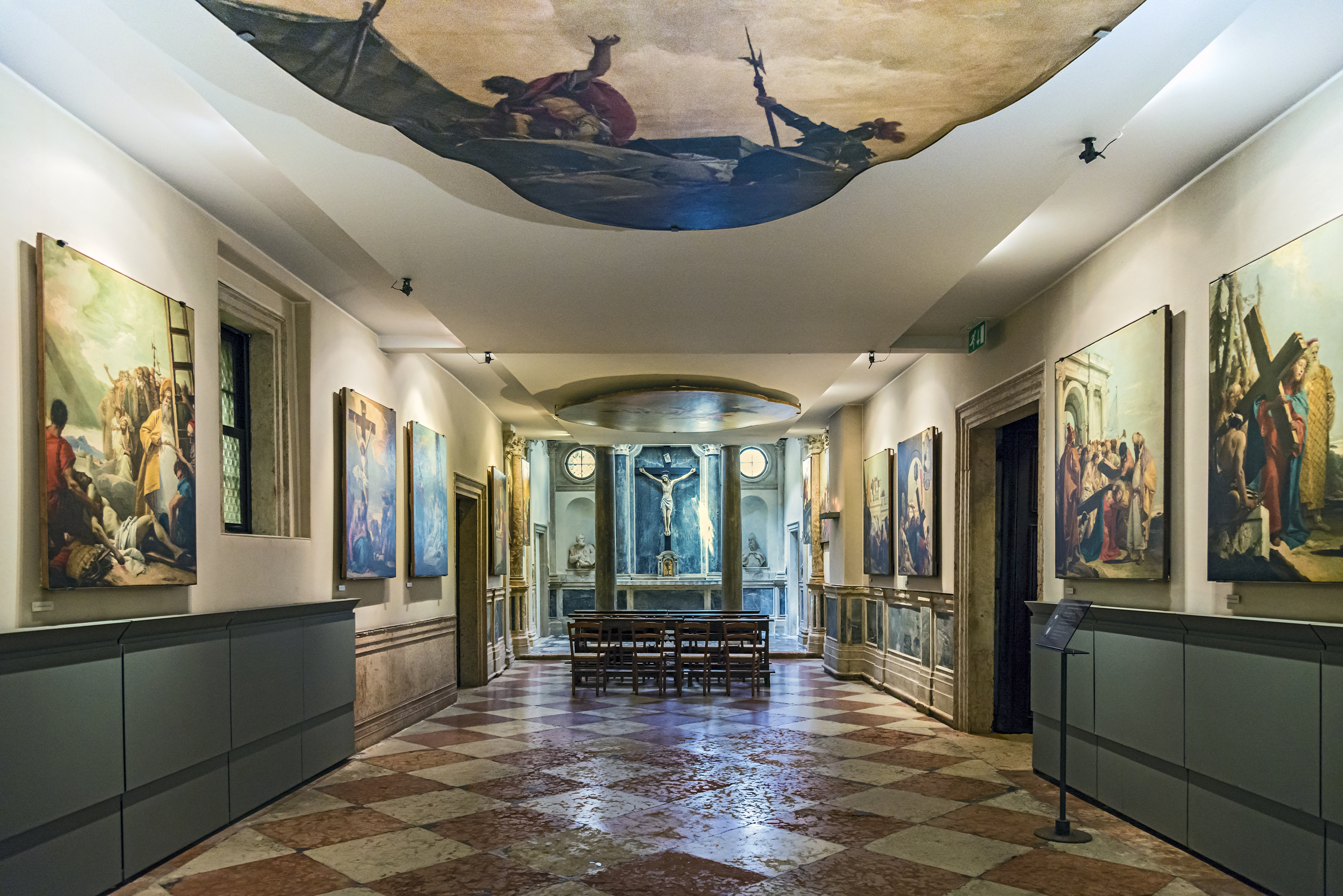
Oratory of the Crucifix - general view

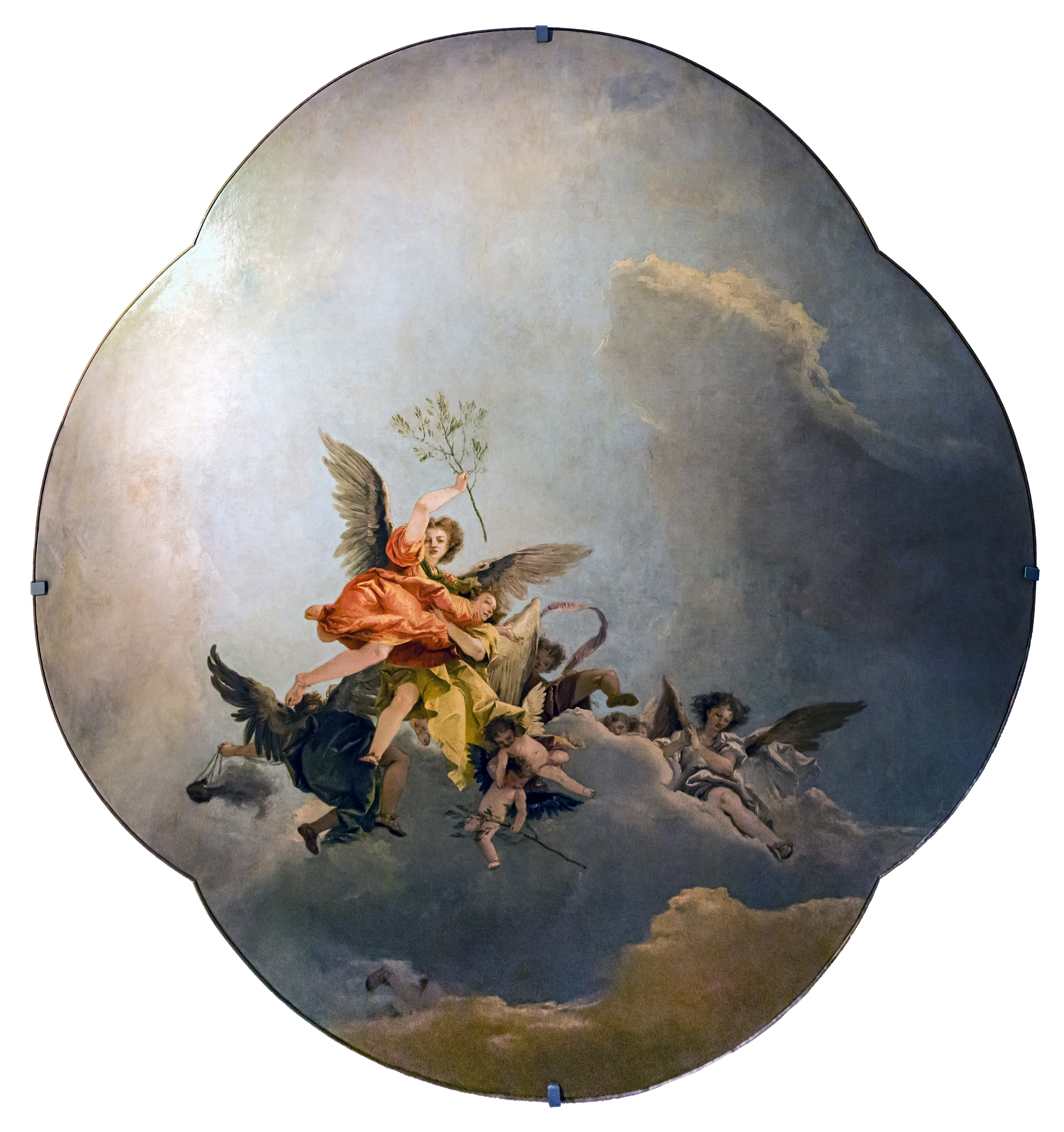
Glory of the Angels by Giandomenico Tiepol

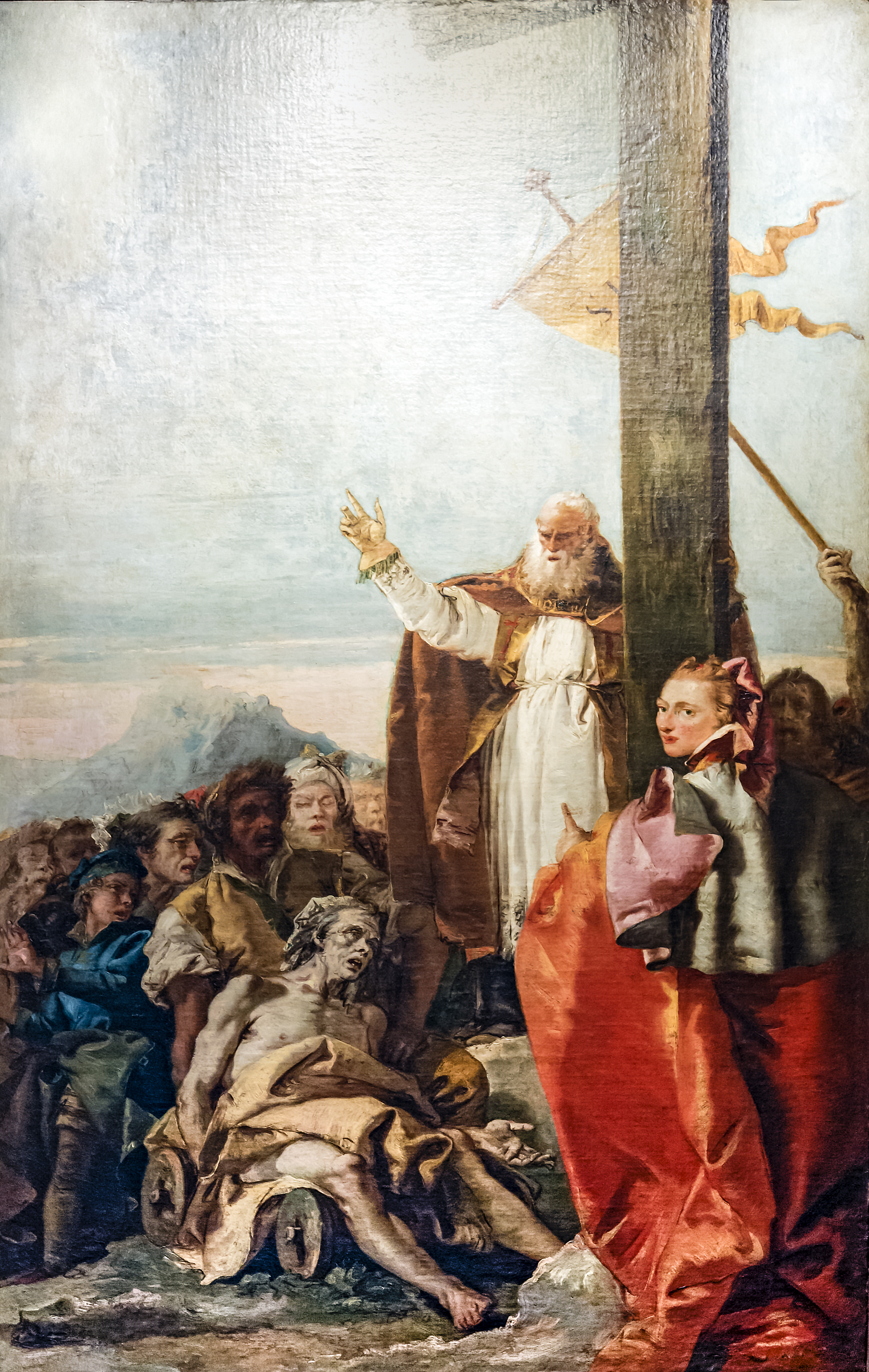
Saints Helena and Macarius by Giandomenico Tiepolo

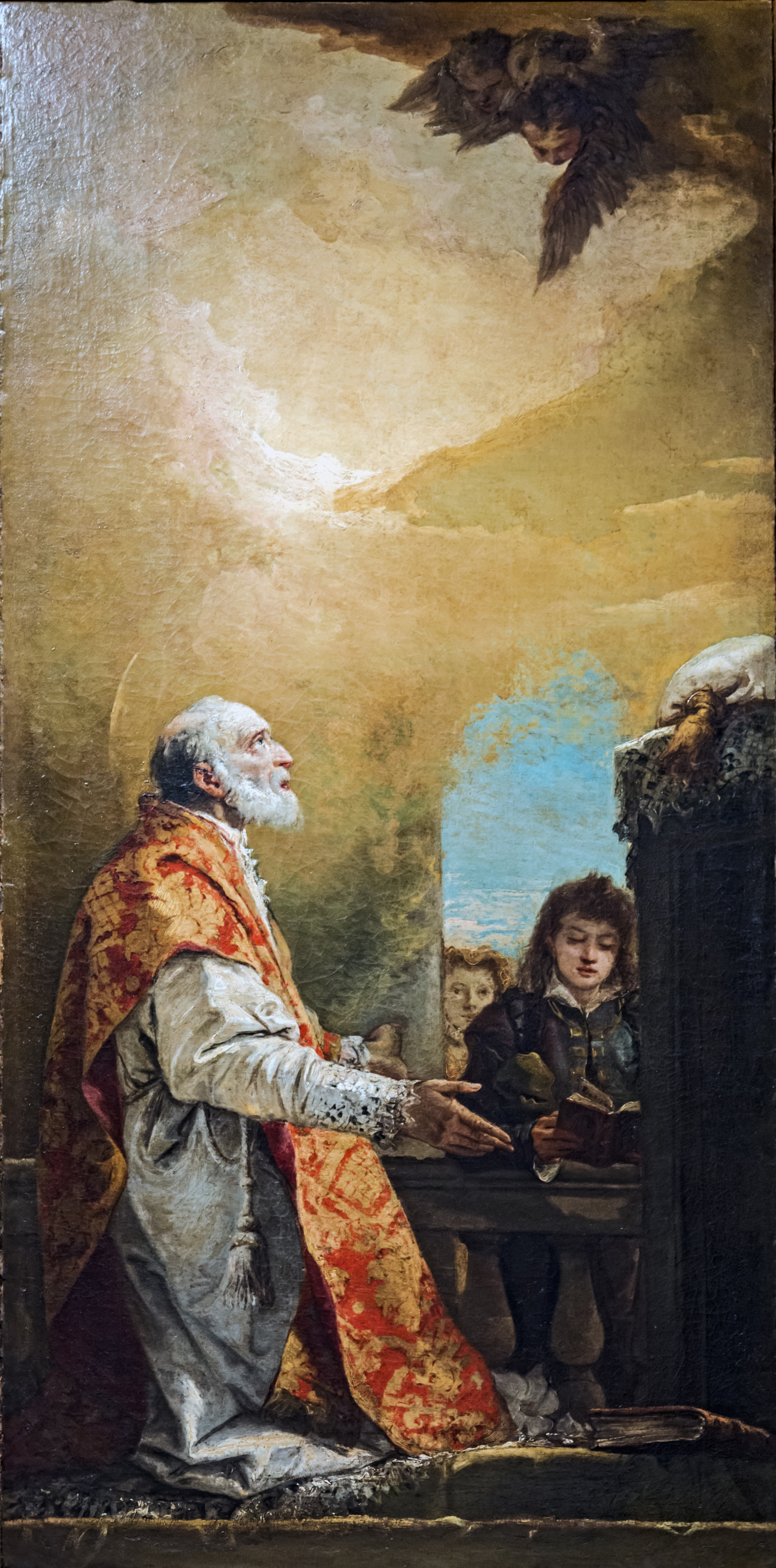
St. Philip Neri by Giandomenico Tiepolo

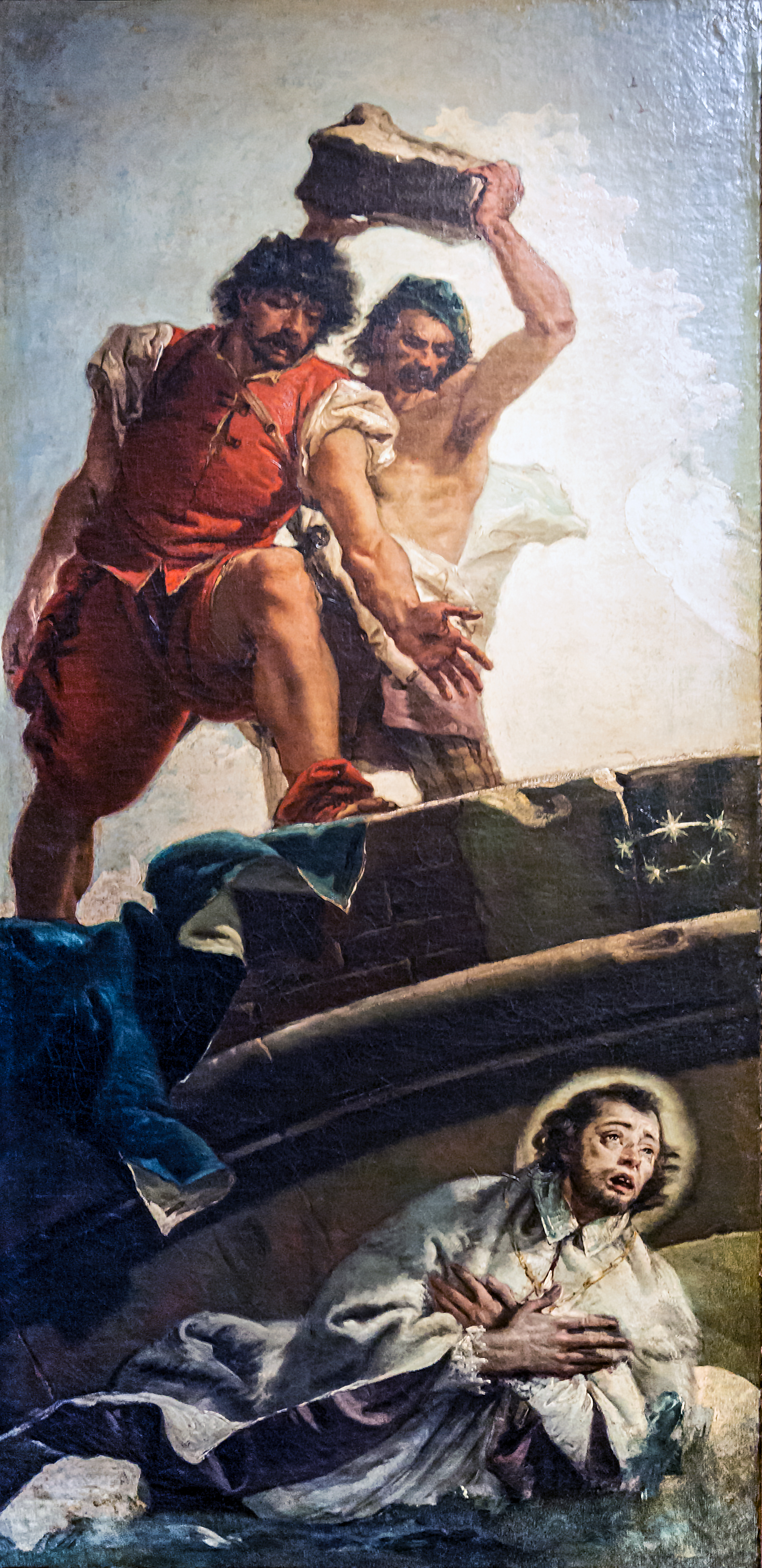
Martyrdom of St John of Nepomuk by Giandomenico Tiepolo

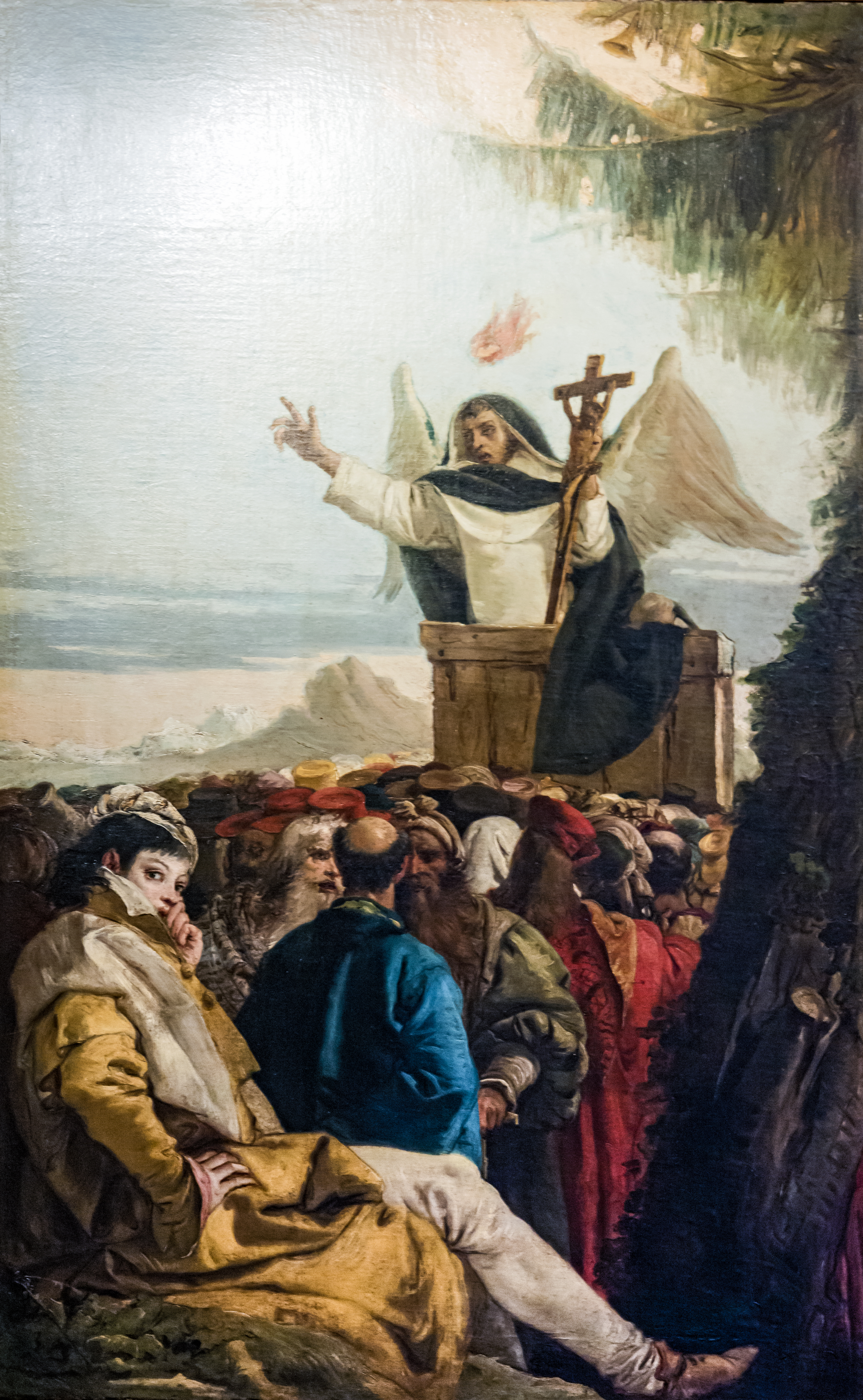
St Vincent Ferreri preaches to the crowd

VIA CRUCIS by Giandomenico Tiepolo

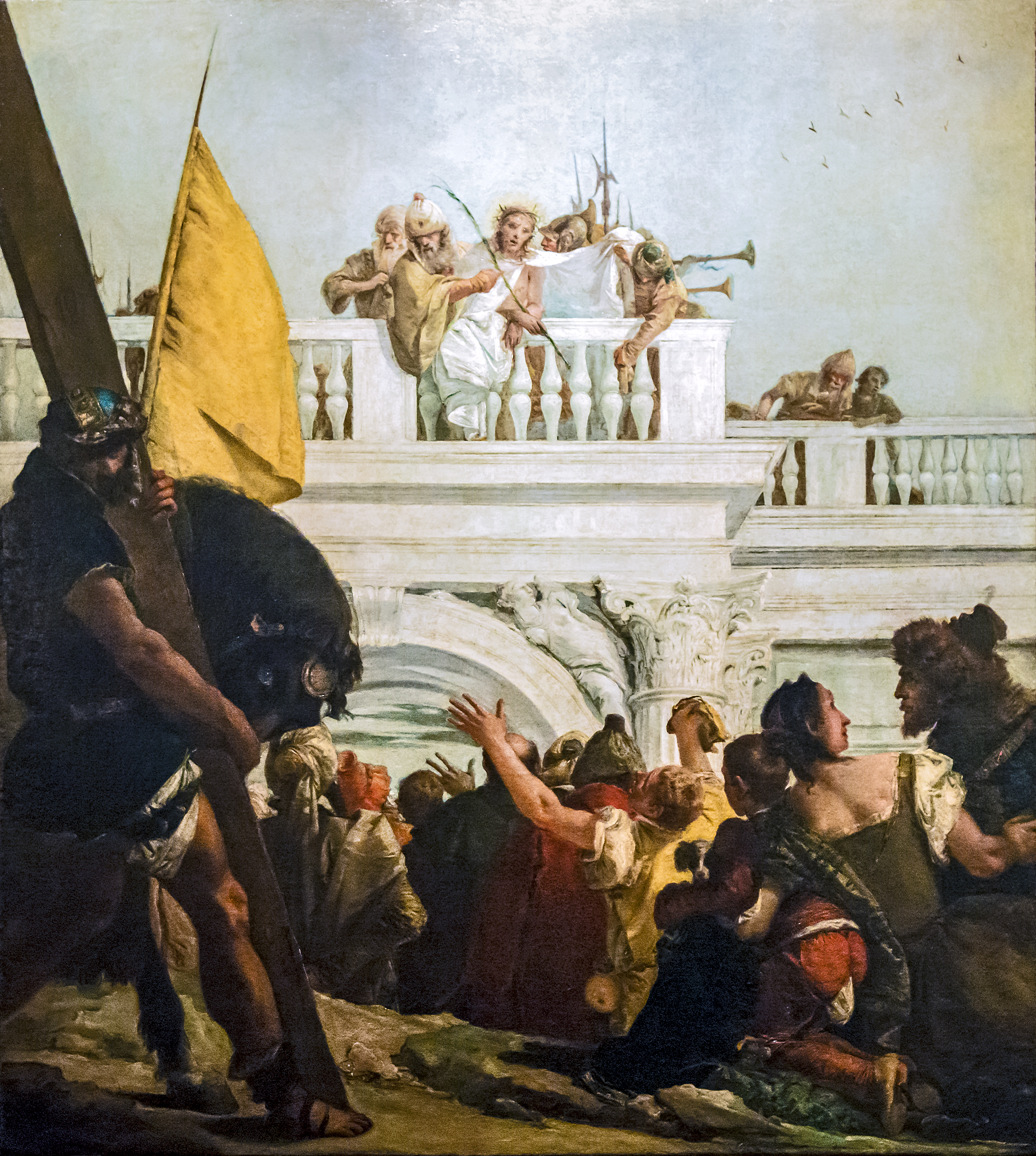
Jesus is sentenced to death

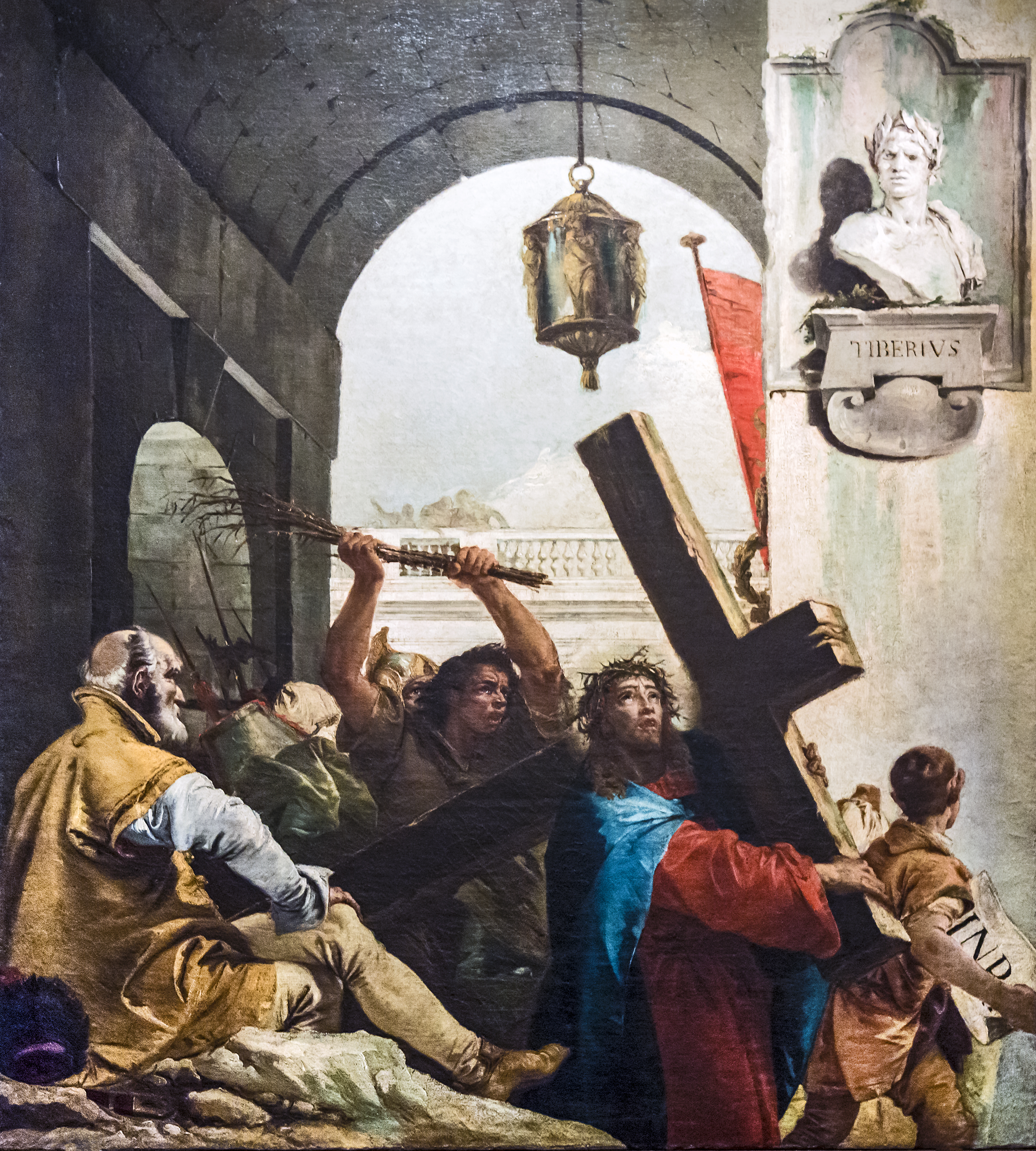
Jesus carries his cross

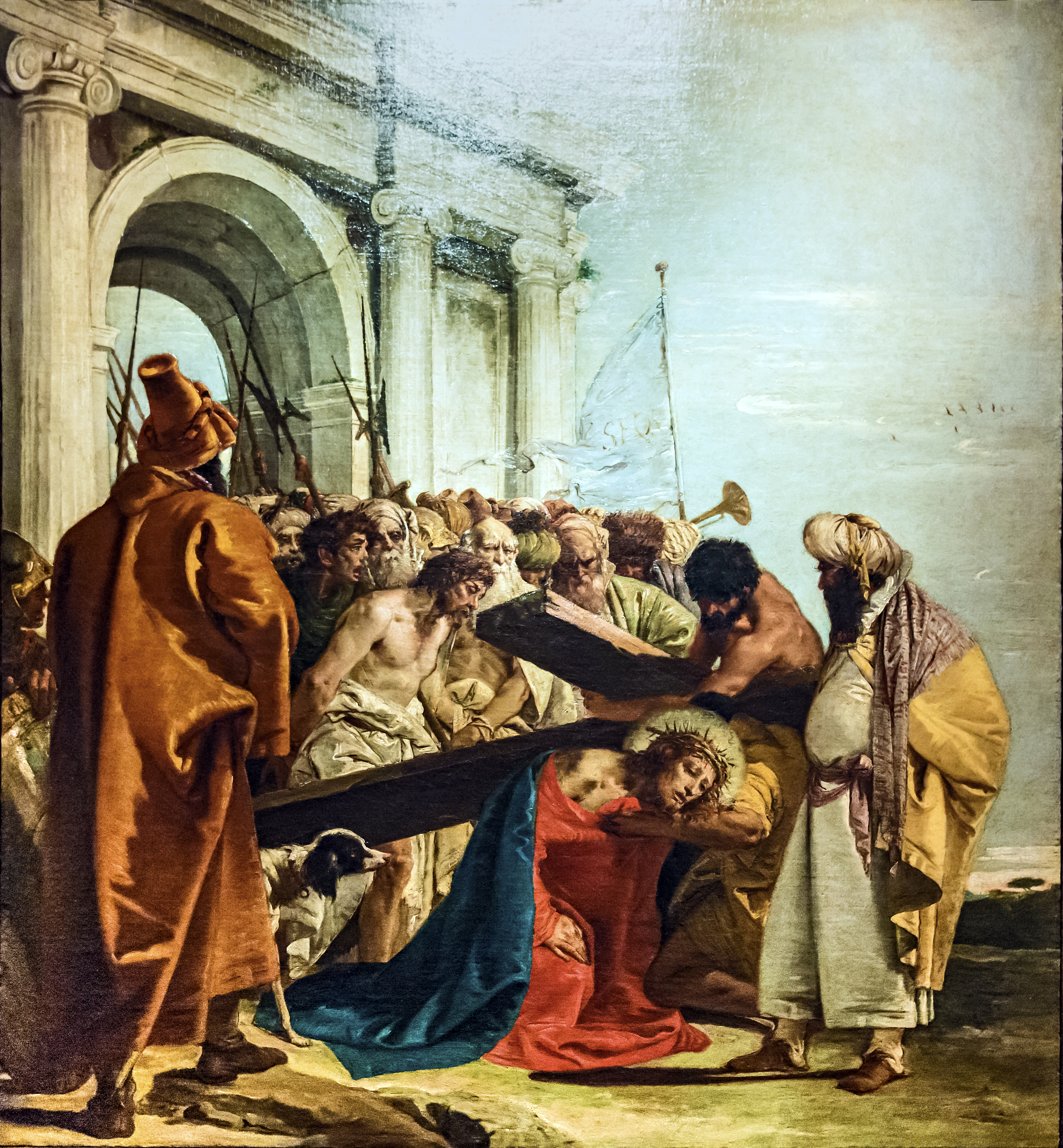
Jesus falls the first time

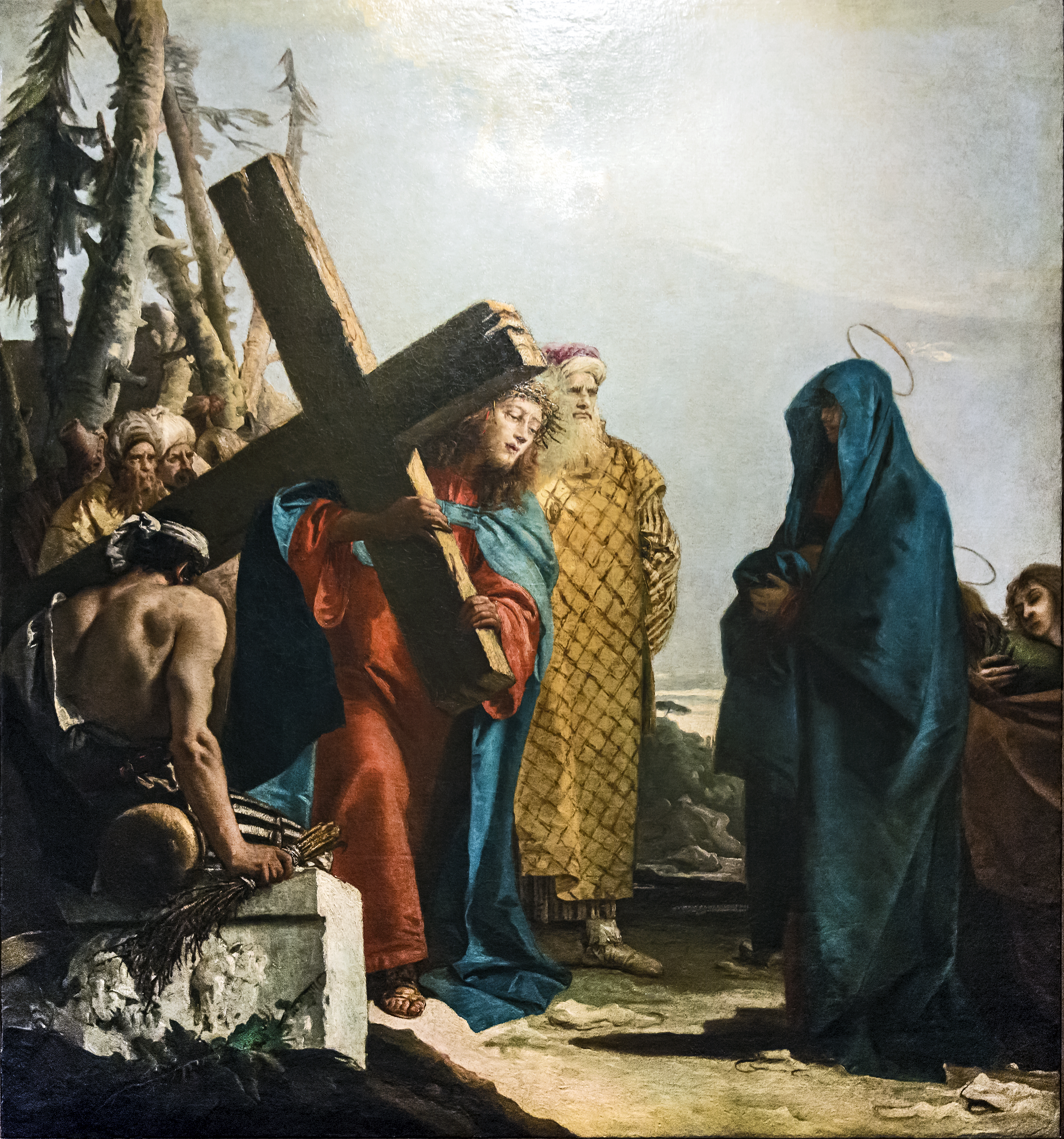
Jesus meets his mother

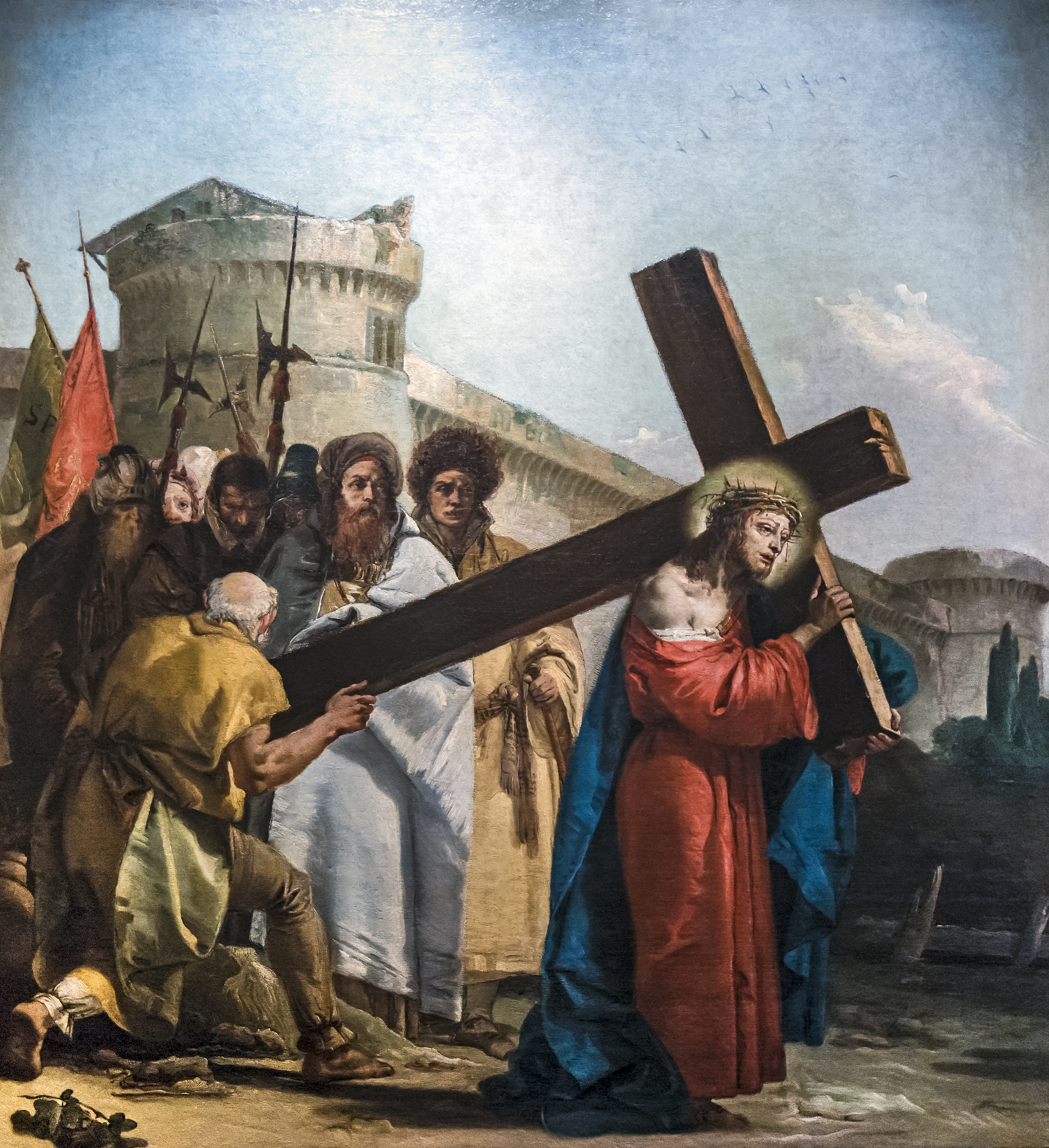
Simon of Cyrene helps Jesus carry the cross

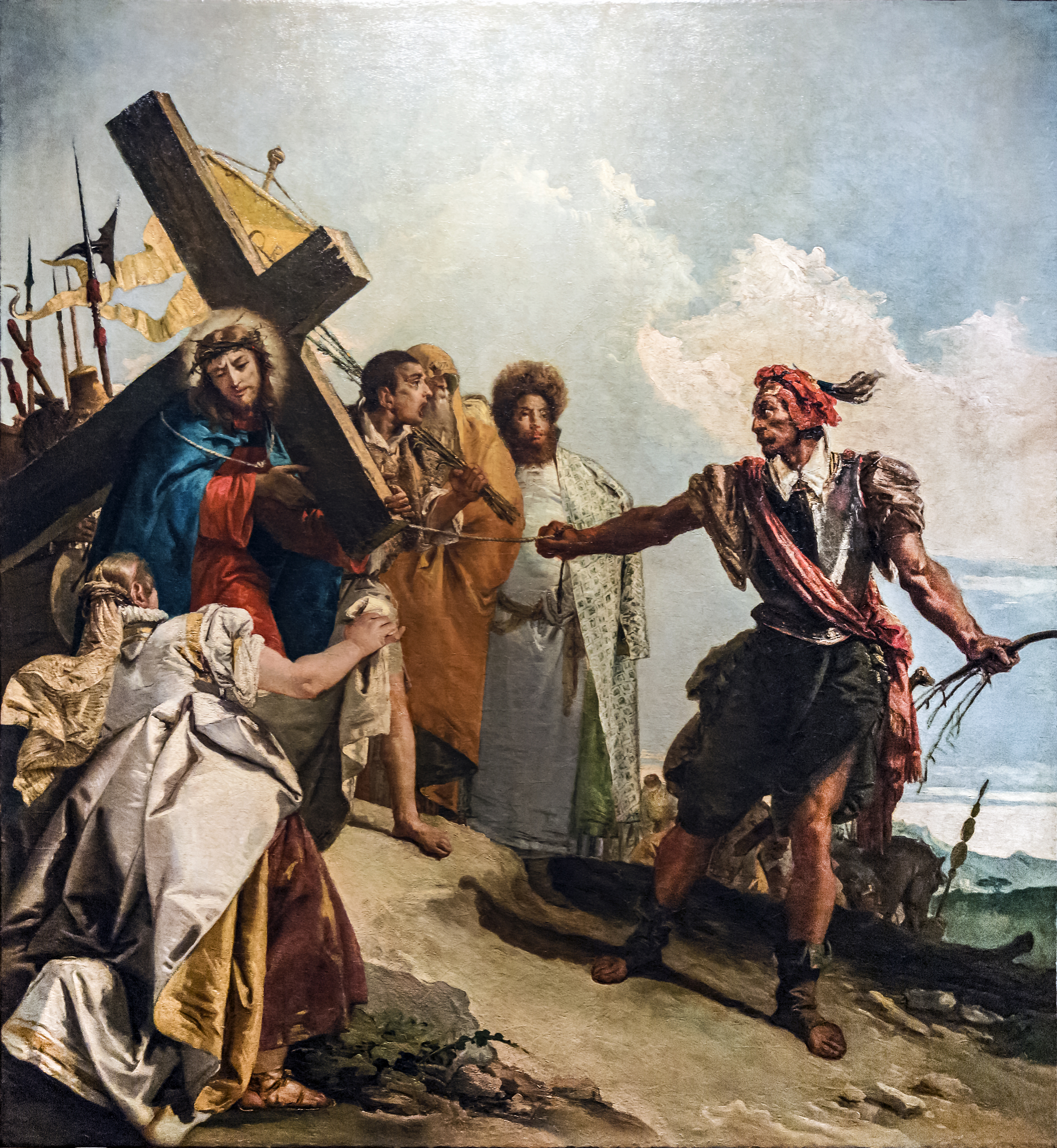
Veronica wipes the face of Jesus

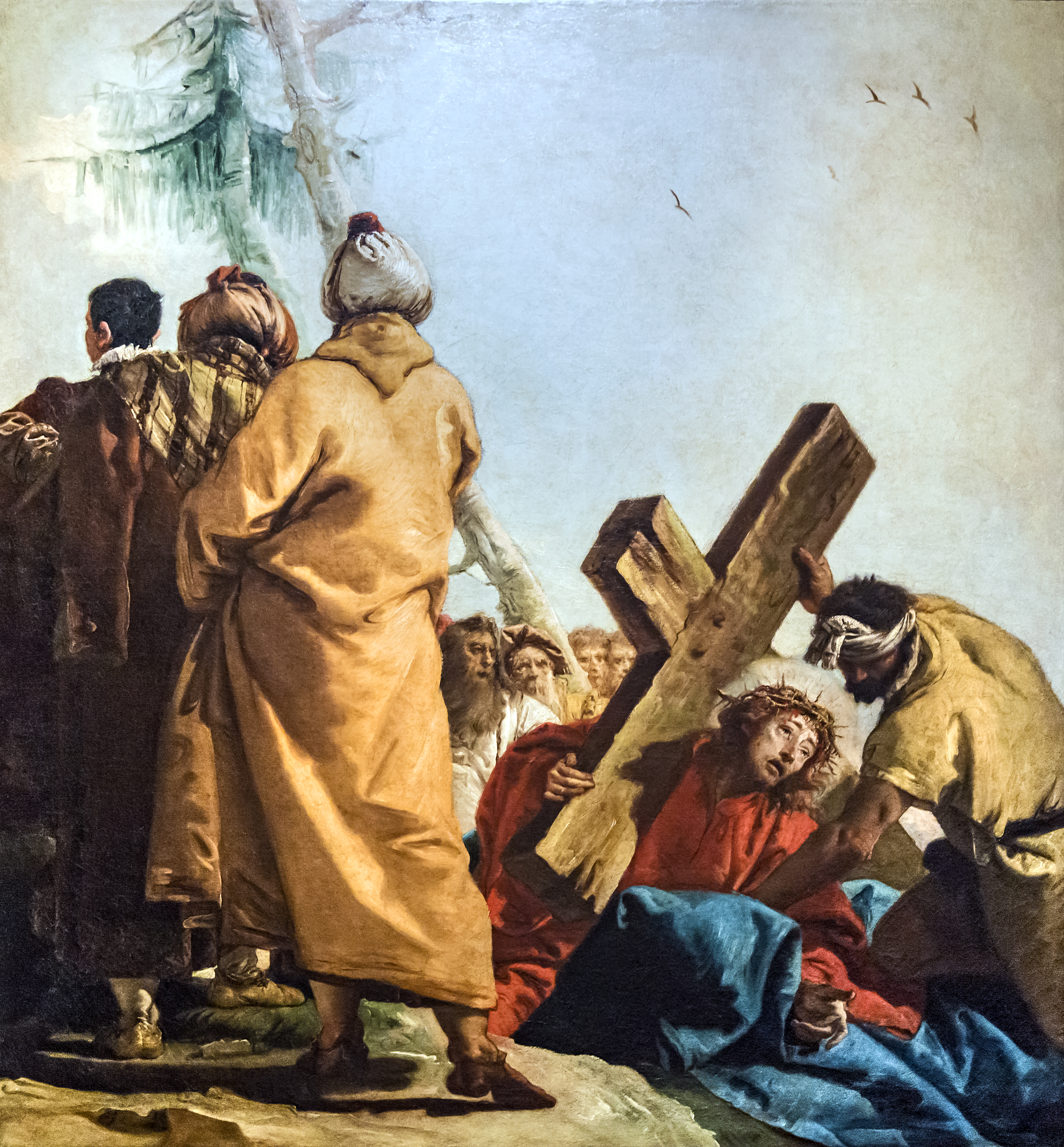
Jesus falls the second time

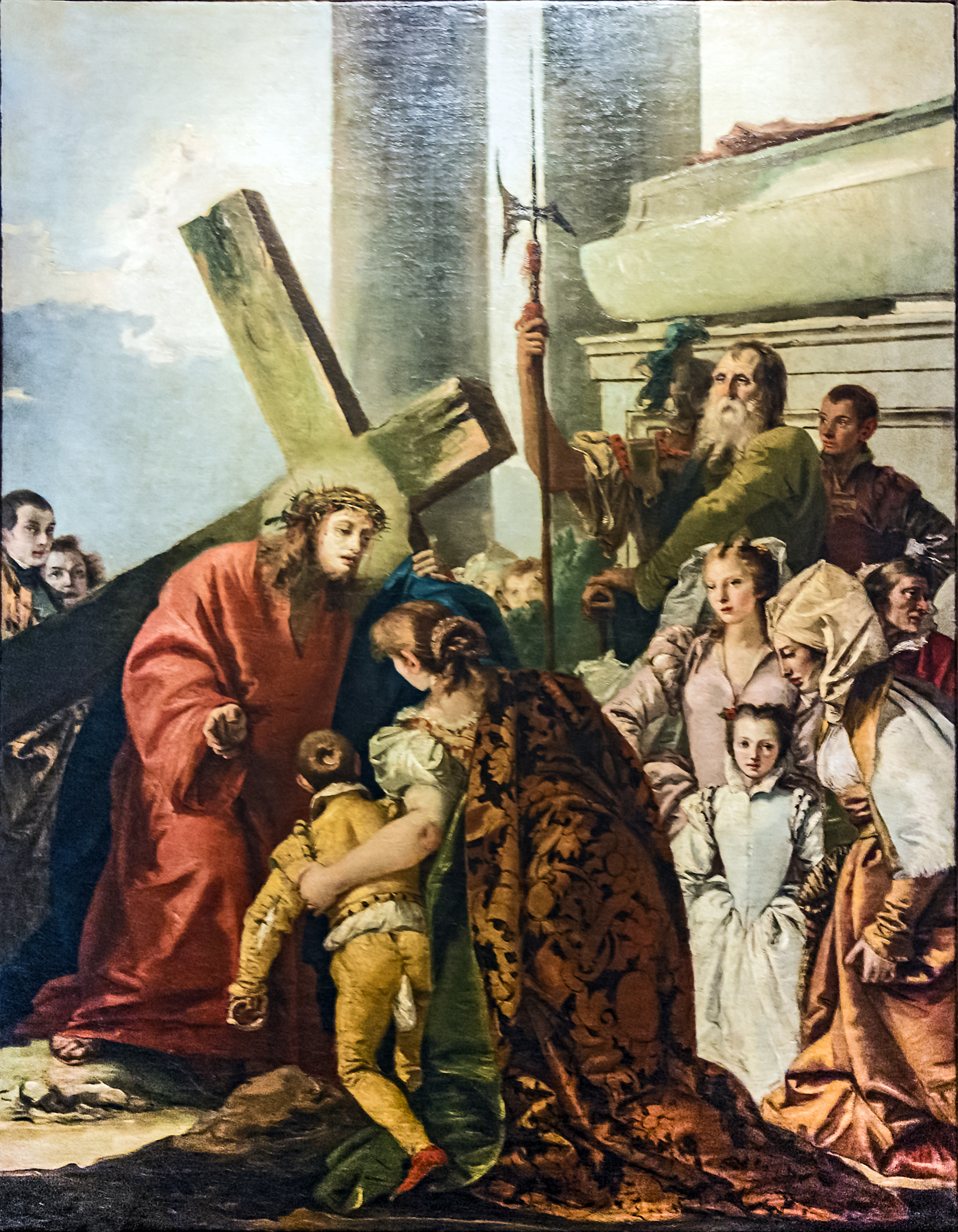
Jesus meets the women of Jerusalem who weep

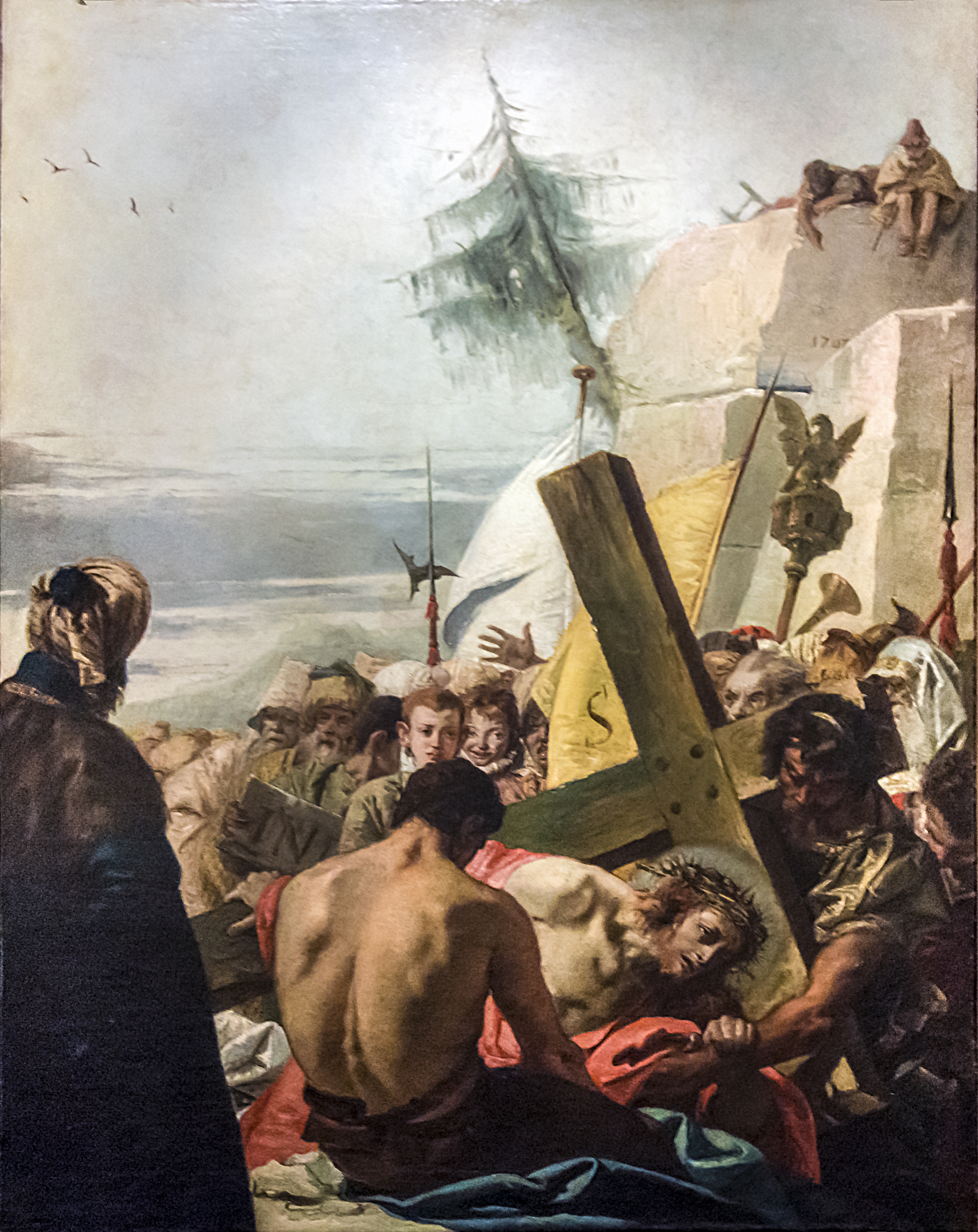
Jesus falls the third time

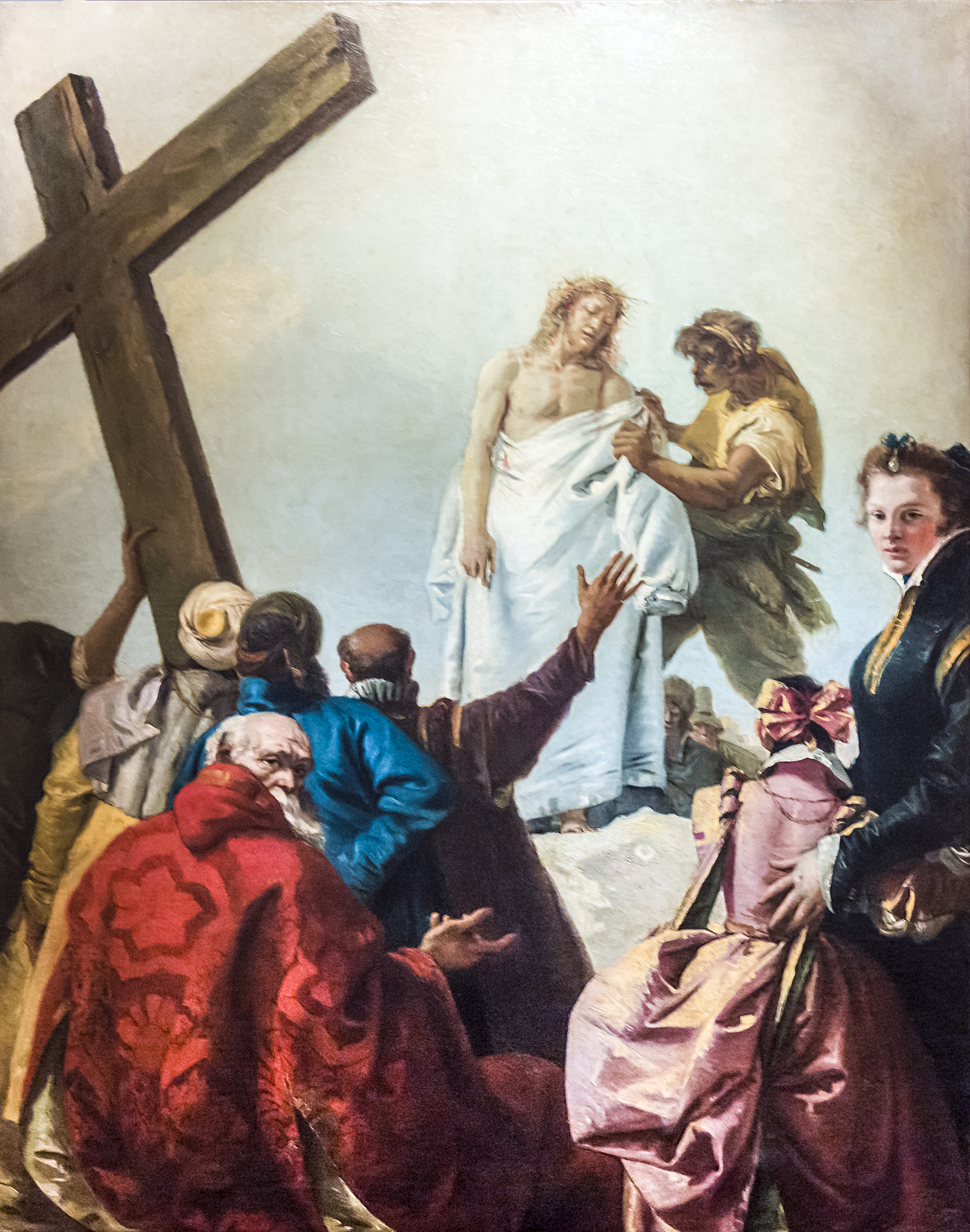
Jesus is stripped of his garments

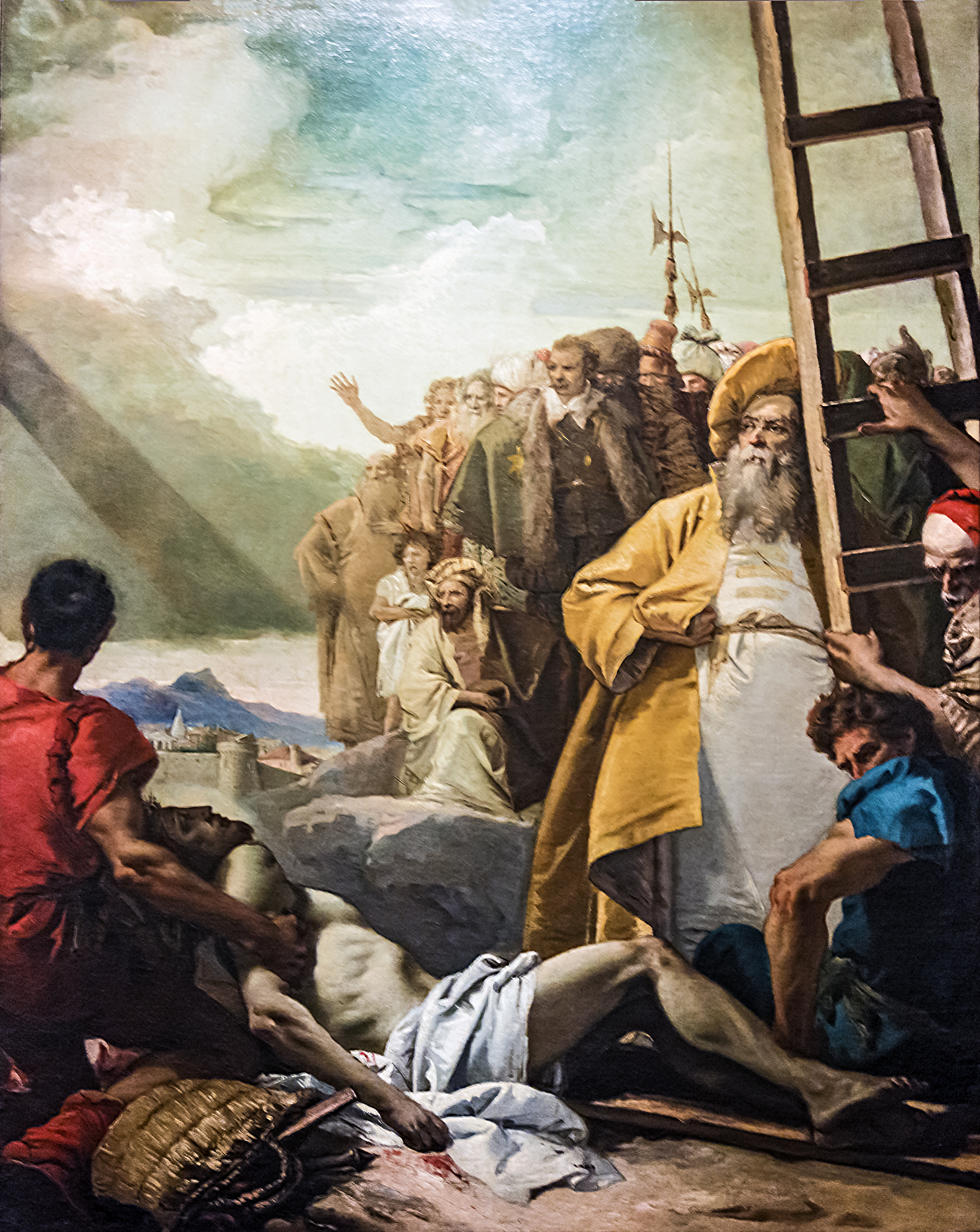
Jesus is nailed to the cross

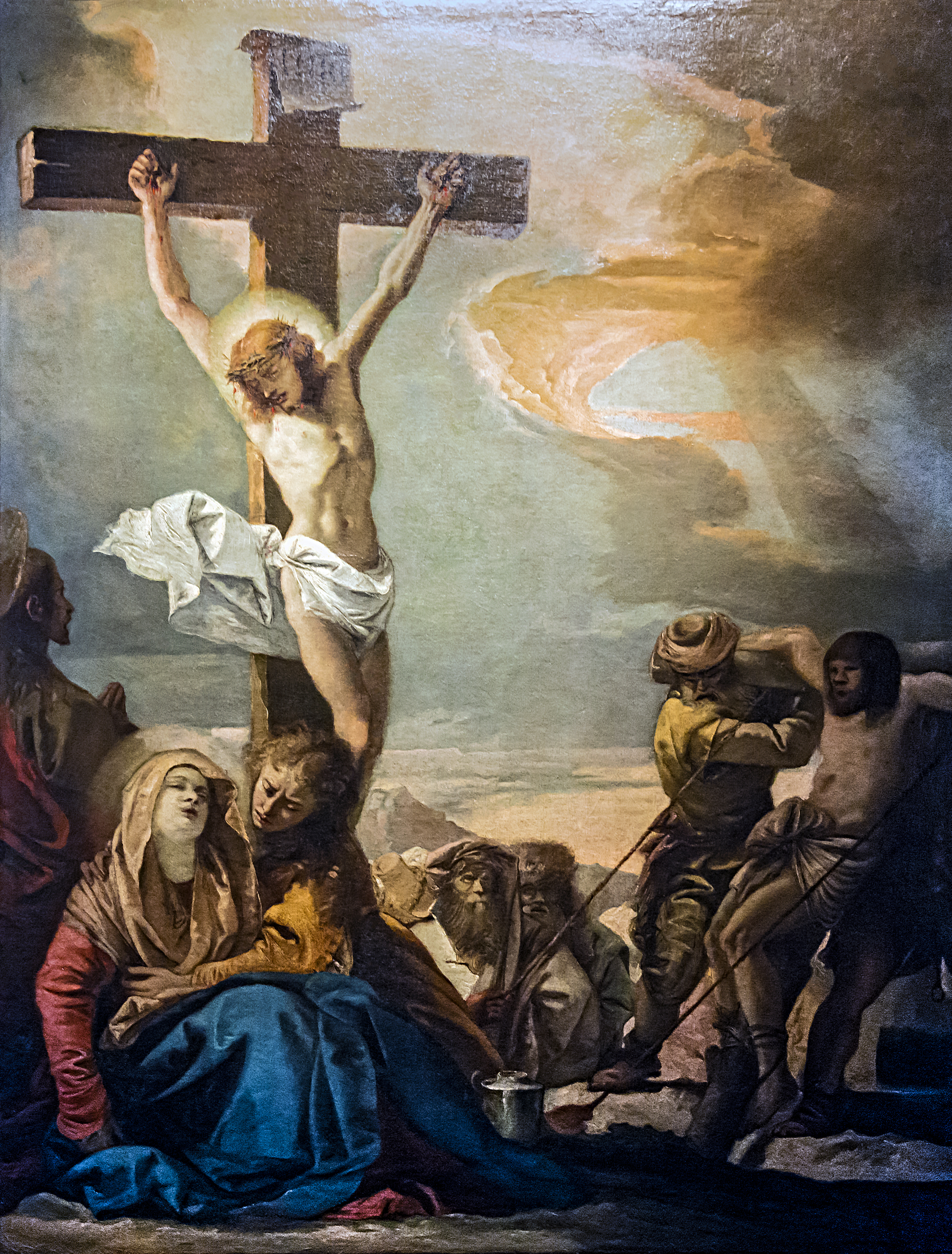
Jesus dies on the cross

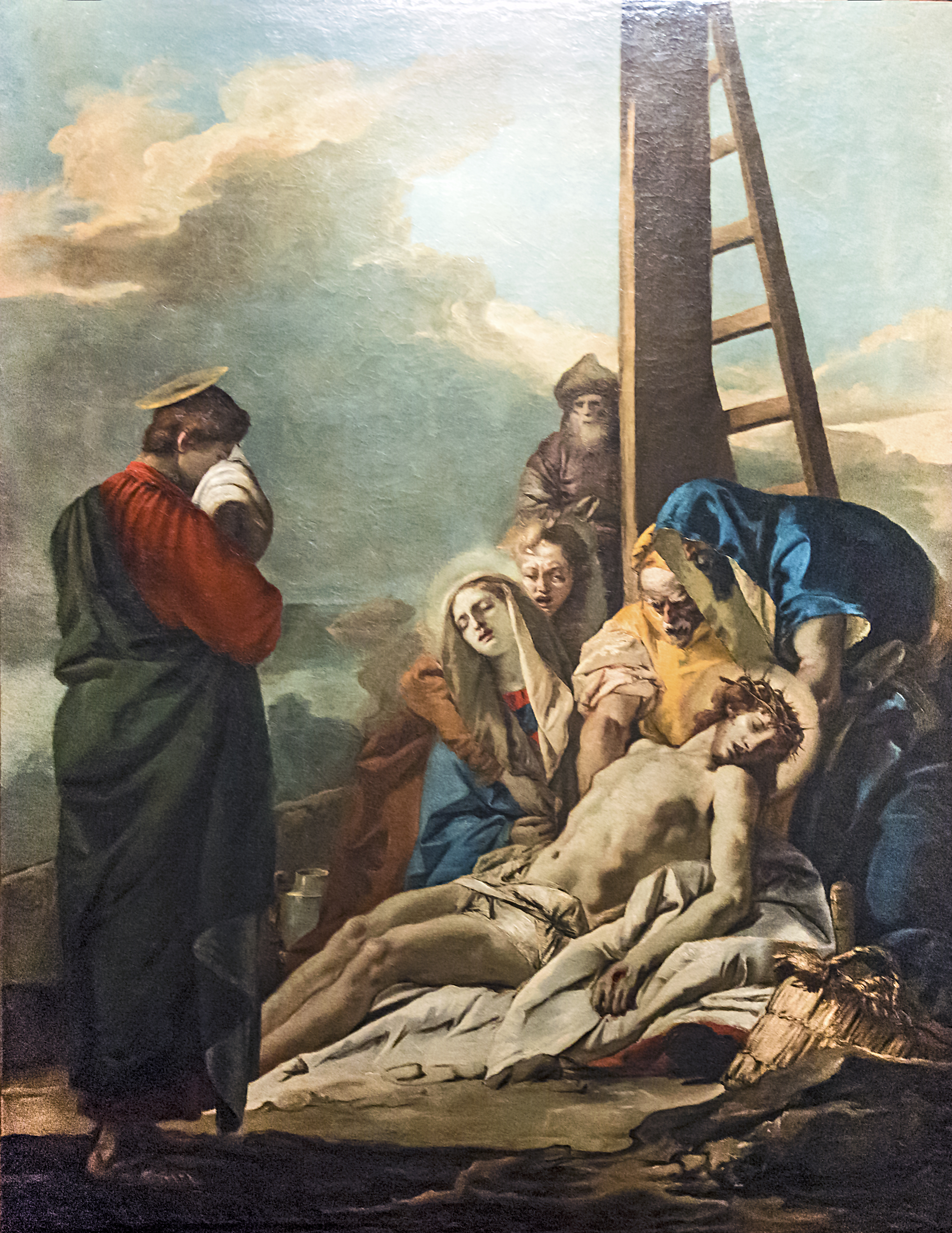
Jesus down from the cross and his body is returned to his mother

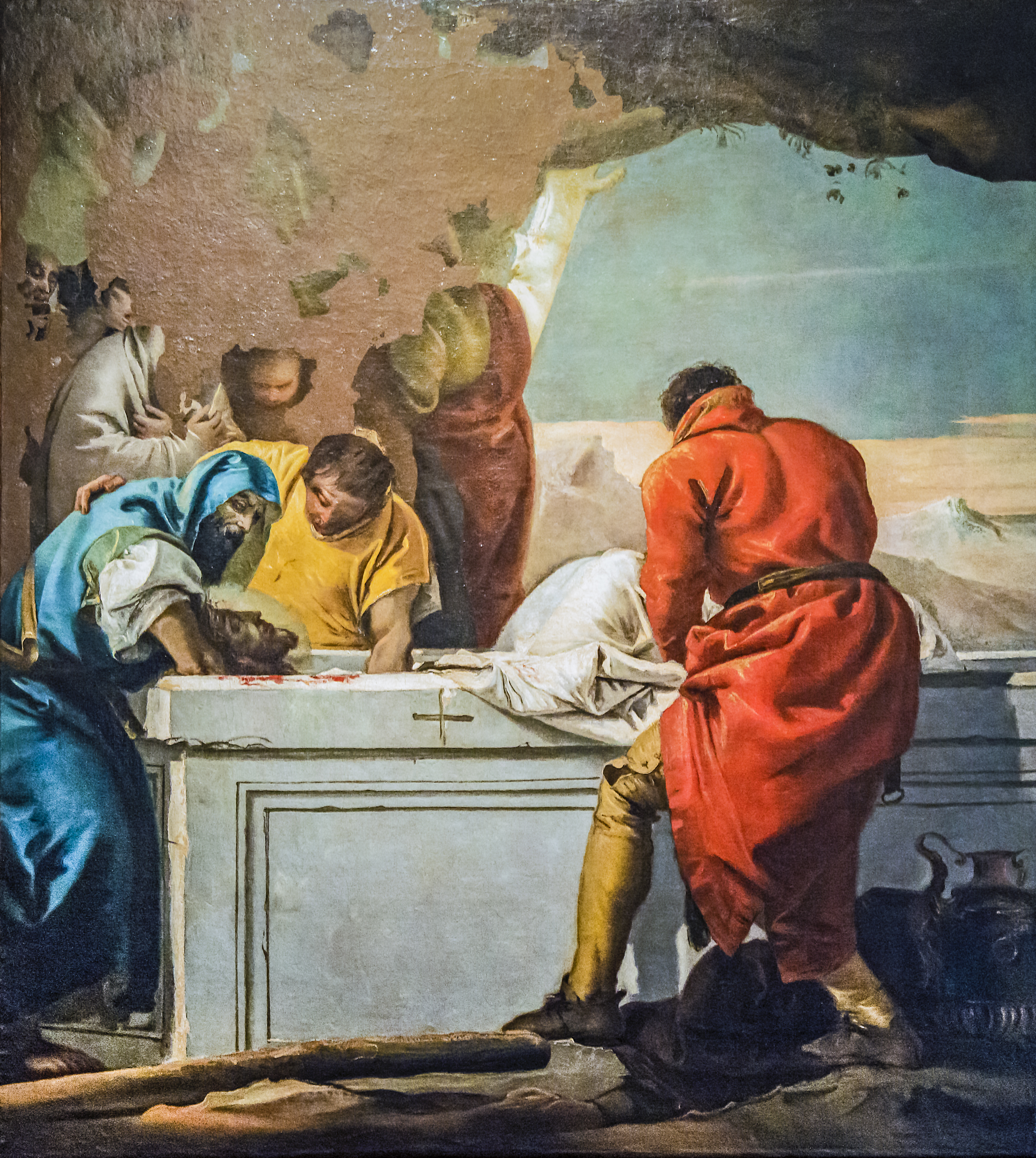
Entombment of Christ

== Other Works of Art in Church ==
- Giambattista Tiepolo (Virgin appearing to a Saint on the north wall of the nave)
- Gian Domenico Tiepolo (Stations of the Cross, Glory of Angels and Resurrection in the Oratory of the Crucifix)
- Veronese (Marriage of the Virgin in the north apse chapel)
