= Elza Sunderland =

American textile artist (1903–1991)

Elza Sunderland (1903 – 1991), also known as Elza of Hollywood, was an American textile artist. She was a leader of Los Angeles textile and apparel industry in the 1940s and 1950s. She produced over two hundreds textiles during her nearly forty-year career. Many of her designs are in permanent collection of Los Angeles County Museum of Art.

== Early life and education ==
Elza Sunderland was born in Hungary and moved with her family to New York in 1910. She took art courses at the Metropolitan Museum and studied textile design at Washington Irving High School. After getting married she moved to Los Angeles and opened her design studio at 403 West 8th Street.

== Art ==
Sunderland was among the first to revolutionize print fabrics used in fashion and home decorating. Her designs incorporated her experience from world travels, books and observations. She was also influenced by her mother whose embroidered doily inspired Sunderland’s strawberry’s motif, designed in 1943. It was her most famous print used mainly for tablecloths. Her synthetic and natural printed fabrics were also used for sportswear and furnishings by designers and retailers across the United States. Elza’s works had California-style imagery and use of color. She defined her pattern design for textiles as ‘Color-fornia’.

Sunderland’s works are represented in the book Made in California: Art, Image, and Identity, 1900-2000.
