= Tsubaki Chinzan =

Japanese painter

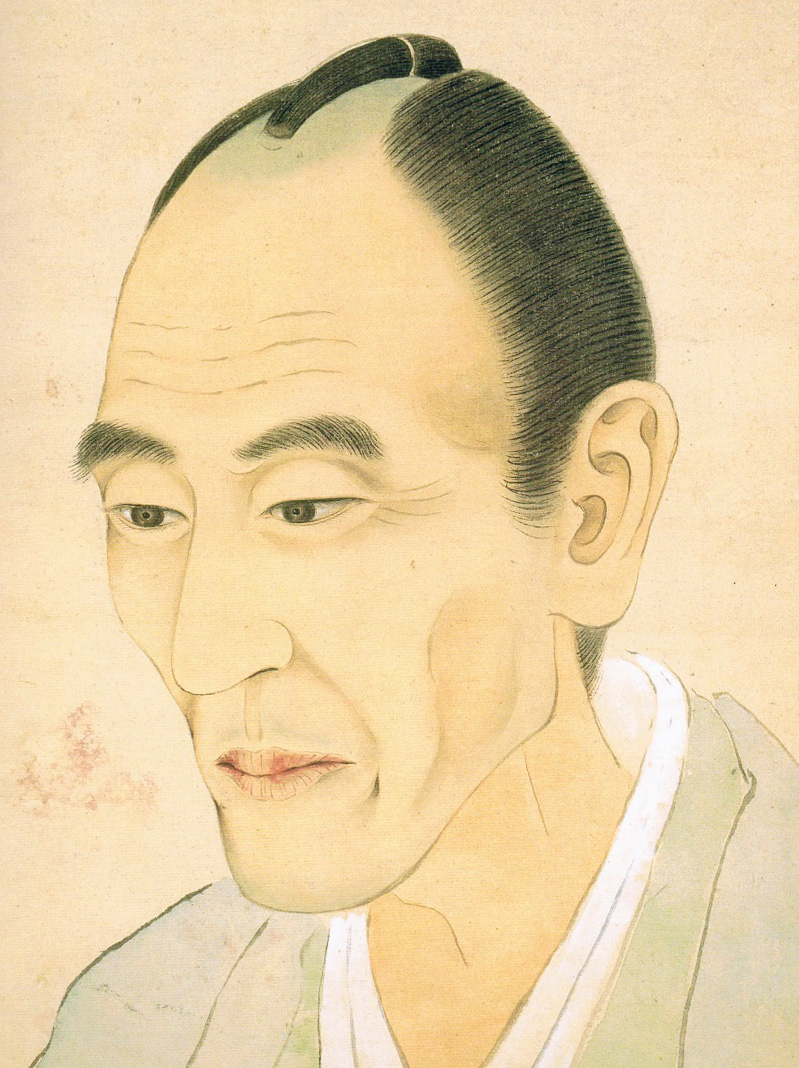
Self-portrait

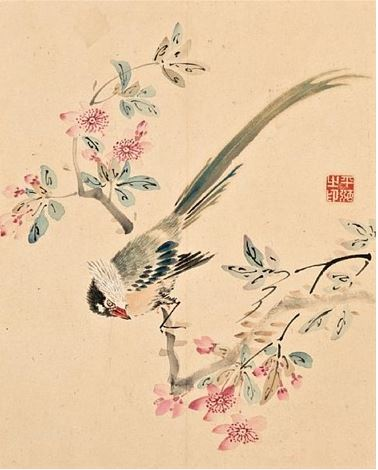
Bird and Flowers

Tsubaki Chinzan, originally Tasuku (Japanese:椿 椿山; 14 July 1801, Edo - 6 August 1854, Edo) was a Japanese painter in the nanga style. His other art names include Hekiin Sambō (壁陰 山房), Kyūan (休庵), Shikyūan (四休庵) and Takukadō (琢華堂).

== Life and work ==
He was born in the Koishikawa district of Edo. He was the son of a Samurai who was a retainer of the Shogunate and served as head of the Spear Corps. His father died when he was seven and, following the hereditary system, he was trained in martial arts and horsemanship. He was personally more inclined to an artistic career. However, to help supplement his meager income, he began to study painting. His first lessons came from Kaneko Kinryō, followed by Tani Bunchō and, lastly, at the age of seventeen, with Watanabe Kazan; becoming his favorite student.

In 1839, when Kazan was caught up in the "Bansha no goku" and imprisoned, Tsubaki was part of the team that rescued him. After Kazan committed seppuku in 1841, he helped raise his son, Shōka, and gave him painting lessons. As a result of this affair, he resigned from the Samurai service.

He painted portraits of many of his associates in the Japanese art world, which show some European influence. His other works, mostly flowers and birds, are firmly grounded in traditional styles. At the age of fifty, he designed two six piece screens (Byōbu). The second, featuring orchids and bamboo (蘭竹図屏風), is one of his most familiar works and is known as the "Ranchiku Screen" in English.

It was said that he was very austere; refraining from alcohol, smoking and, until he was married, female companionship. He also slept little. In addition to painting, he wrote haiku, practiced the tea ceremony and played the shō. His son, Kakoku, was also a talented painter, but died at the age of twenty-six, before his father.

Tsubaki's work is held in the permanent collections of many institutions, including the Metropolitan Museum of Art, the Tochigi Prefectural Museum of Fine Arts, the Seattle Art Museum, the Birmingham Museum of Art, the University of Michigan Museum of Art, the Los Angeles County Museum of Art, the Herbert F. Johnson Museum of Art, the Philadelphia Museum of Art, and the Detroit Institute of Arts.

== Sources ==
- Takeda, Kōichi: Tsubaki Chinzan. In: Nihon no Nanga. Tōshindō, 2000. ISBN 4-88713-347-2.
- Laurance P. Roberts: Chinzan. In: A Dictionary of Japanese Artists. Weatherhill, 1976. ISBN 0-8348-0113-2.
