= Streeter Blair =

American painter

- Born: Streeter E Blair; July 16, 1888; Cadmus, Kansas, U.S.
- Died: November 3, 1966 (aged 78); Beverly Hills, California, U.S.
- Education: Self-taught
- Known for: Painting
- Notable work: Meadow Lark Ranch, Fall Pasture, Winter Scene With A Red Barn, Dinner Time:Orange Picnic
- Movement: Primitivism
- Patrons: Vincent Price

Streeter Blair (July 16, 1888 – November 3, 1966) was an American painter who practiced Primitivism.

== Background ==
Streeter Blair was born in Cadmus, Kansas to Edward Blair and Lulu Hiatt. His father was a poet and his mother a homemaker. In 1913, Blair married Camille Hook in Jackson, Missouri. His oldest daughter, Betsy Lynette Blair was described by him as being "way off to one side compared to the rest of us" as well as a painter, sculptor, poet and dancer Their second child was Saz Blair to which he referred as being a good horsewoman. He was proud that she had graduated with high honors in fine arts from the University of Arizona

Streeter Blair was chosen by TIME Magazine for an article in the March 1969 issue. The headline emphasized Blair's late start to painting at the age of 60. A customer at his antiques store brought an unrecorded artifact and when Streeter couldn't describe the old Pennsylvania farmhouse it came from, he painted it. Previous to painting, Blair had successful careers as a teacher, clothier, editor, in advertising and as an antique dealer.

== Exhibitions ==
He was given his first exhibition in New York, at the Carlebach Gallery. Six of his paintings were chosen for a Smithsonian Institution Traveling Exhibition. His work was shown at the Ferus Gallery in 1964, where Vincent Price bought the entire exhibition. An Exhibition of his work, "Streeter Blair's America, 1886-1966: A Retrospective Exhibition" was shown at the Sari Heller Gallery in Beverly Hills, California 1970, with essay by Frank R. Heller, list of museum collections, bibliography.

== Notable works by Streeter Blair ==
- "Two winter village scenes (2 works) (1965), Oil on Canvas, Bonhams San Francisco
- "Calabasas Inn 1859" (1950), Clark's Fine Art Gallery
- "Kansas Sod-House Homesteaders, 1870" (1965), Bonhams San Francisco
- "Oranges versus housing", The Phillips Collection, Washington DC
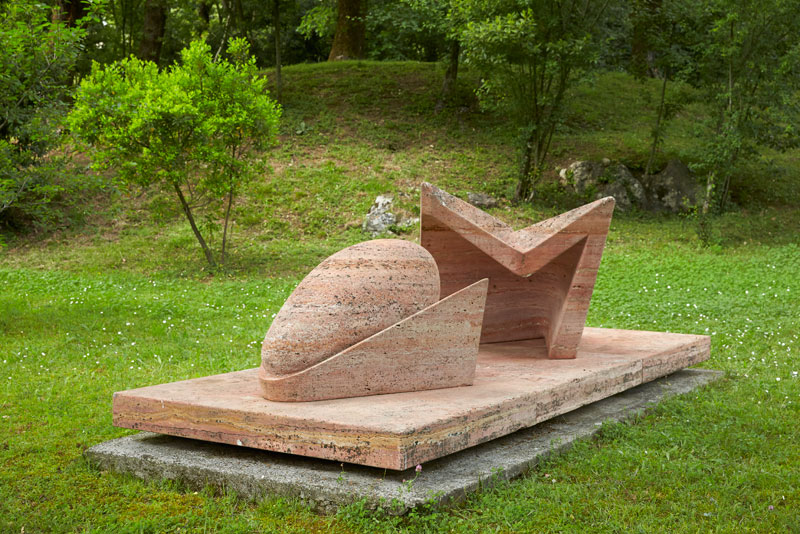
  Ginko Biloba - Philips Collection, Washington, D.C. - 1974
- "Dinner Time: Orange Picnic, Cadmus, Kansas, 1900" (1951), Sunset Estate Auction Bonhams
- "Ice Cream Strawberry Social, Kansas 1903"
