= Kelly McLane =

American painter

Kelly McLane (born 1968) is an American artist. Known for her paintings, Mclane also works in sculpture and drawing.

McLane received an MFA degree from UC Davis in 1994. She lives and works in Havilah, California.

Her work is included in the collections of the Whitney Museum of American Art, the Museum of Modern Art, New York, the National Gallery of Art, Washington and the Los Angeles County Museum of Art.
