= Paolo Piazza =

Italian painter

Paolo Piazza, the secular name of the Franciscan priest Padre Cosmo da Castelfranco or Fra Cosimo Piazza, (1557-1621) was an Italian painter active in North-Central Italy.

He was born in Castelfranco in the Veneto. He joined the order of Capuchin monks. He painted for the Casino Eucherio Sanvitale of Parma, until requisitioned by Scipione Borghese to go to Rome in 1611. He painted for the Palazzo Borghese in Rome. He painted for the church of Sant'Antonio (1608) in Narni and the church of San Martino (1610) in Terni.

He is said to have studied under Palma the Younger, traveled to Germany to work under Rudolf II. After working for Pope Paul V, he returned to Venice to work for the Doge Antonio Priuli, he died in Venice and was buried at the Church of il Redentore.
