= Elizabeth McCord =

American painter

- Born: January 30, 1914
- Died: April 18, 2008 (aged 94)

Elizabeth McCord (January 30, 1914 – April 18, 2008) was an American modernist painter whose colorful biomorphic and architectural abstractions influenced the hard-edge movement of the 1950s and were uniquely poised at the intersection of Southern California’s thriving mid-century art, design, and architecture scenes. Her work frequently appeared in shows at the Los Angeles County Museum of Art, the Long Beach Museum of Art, the Los Angeles Art Association, and the Art Center College of Design alongside works by Lorser Feitelson, Helen Lundeberg, Josef Albers, June Wayne, and Knud Merrild, among others.

== Early life and education ==
McCord was born in Dayton, Ohio, on January 30, 1914, but she spent the first year of her life in San Francisco; her father had temporarily relocated there for work. McCord studied at the Art Institute of Chicago from 1932-1934.

== Hull House ==
After graduating in 1934, McCord lived for a short time in Boston, but by 1938 she had returned to Chicago, lured by the city’s progressive politics and more cosmopolitan art scene. One of the few sites where these forces overlapped was Hull House, the legendary settlement house founded by Nobel Peace Prize laureate Jane Addams in 1889 as a place where immigrants of diverse communities could gather to learn, eat, debate, and acquire the tools necessary to put down roots in their adopted country. McCord accepted a job in the Hull House Art Department, where she taught immigrants how to paint and draw, and moved into a garret on the top floor of Addams’ old Victorian mansion.

McCord produced her first mature works during her time at Hull House, which lasted until 1945. In the summer of 1938, she created several covers for the Hull House Block News, and also designed a poster, “Halsted Street,” for the organization. Soon after, she was accepted as an “easel artist” for the Federal Art Project (FAP), which was the visual arts division of Franklin Roosevelt’s ambitious, Depression-Era Works Progress Administration (WPA).

== Career ==
The WPA stipend enabled McCord to move out of the Hull House and into her own apartment on the north side of Chicago. In 1939, her “City Scene” was one of 60 WPA paintings selected for inclusion in the permanent collection of the National Gallery in Washington, D.C. During this period she also exhibited at the Illinois State Museum, and at the Art Institute of Chicago in 1940.

At the same time, McCord was making connections through Hull-House that would deepen her engagement with modernism. As a supervisor with the Donald Vestal Puppet Project, a WPA project in which participants made puppets, wrote plays, and performed at Chicago’s Natural History Museum, McCord came into contact with Donald Vestal, a modern-art gallerist and eventual Gertrude Stein collaborator, and Burr Tillstrom, the celebrated modern puppeteer who went on to create Kulka, Fran and Ollie.

McCord also met Frank Lloyd Wright in Chicago, likely through Hull-House, where the renowned modernist architect had delivered his groundbreaking lecture “The Art and Craft of the Machine ” in 1901 and with which he had a lasting relationship. (Wright’s mother and uncle were both Hull-House volunteers ). McCord’s association with Wright sparked a lifelong fascination with architecture. When she was later asked to name her favorite artists, McCord said there were only three to whom she “responded with feeling”: “Cezanne, Claude Lorrain, and Frank Lloyd Wright.”

== California ==
By 1945, McCord’s parents and three younger brothers had all moved to California, and when the war ended, she followed them west, settling in Venice Beach, where she quickly integrated herself into the local bohemian community.

McCord’s paintings were greeted with widespread acclaim, frequently appearing in shows at the Los Angeles County Museum of Art, the Long Beach Museum of Art, the Los Angeles Art Association, and the Art Center School of Design alongside works by Lorser Feitelson, Helen Lundeberg, Josef Albers, June Wayne, and Knud Merrild, among others.

In 1951, McCord married Lou Newman. Her work was featured in LACMA’s cutting-edge exhibition Painting in the USA; the same year she participated in Six Portable Murals, a group show organized by the Los Angeles Art Association that advertised itself as a collection of paintings “designed especially for mid-century architecture.” “Painting,” a large McCord abstraction acquired by June Wayne and prominently displayed in Wayne’s Alvin Lustig-designed home, appeared on the cover of the Nov. 11, 1951 issue of The Los Angeles Times Home magazine in a color photograph by Julius Shulman. Leading architectural critic Esther McCoy wrote the accompanying article.

Although McCord continued to exhibit locally and paint at her Venice Beach studio—and although her works were acquired by significant collectors (Alice Parker Henderson, Maurice Weiss, Lorser Feitelson) and major museums, including the Long Beach Museum of Art—she was largely overlooked after the 1950s. But in 2011 the seeds of a McCord revival were planted when her Big Pink (1951) was the only painting chosen to appear in "Living in a Modern Way," LACMA’s sweeping survey of mid-century California design.

McCord died at her home in Venice Beach on April 18, 2008.

== Critical reception ==
Writing in East of Borneo about McCord's contribution to the 1951 exhibition "Six Portable Murals" at the Los Angeles Art Association, critic Jonathan Griffin described McCord as "an accomplished colourist" who was "an innovator long before the term 'Hard Edge' was coined in 1959, and before the expressionist Richard Diebenkorn became associated with the Ocean Park area of Santa Monica when he moved there in 1966." Griffin went on to suggest that the reason McCord "has not enjoyed the exposure, until now, of her male peers" likely reflects "the prejudice that female artists faced in mid-century California, relegated to making décor rather than progressive artistic experiments."

In an Artillery magazine review of McCord's 2013-2014 retrospective Elizabeth McCord Paintings at See Line Gallery in Los Angeles, Peter Frank wrote that "the palette McCord maintained throughout her career, brimming with dark tones but bright chromas, seems deliberately designed to convey a sense of light and atmosphere, most specifically that of Southern California’s Mediterranean climate," adding that "her exercises in sensuous or subdued palette all have a compositional soundness to them." Frank concluded that "McCord’s particular take on such 'concrete expressionism' ... was sprightly and distinctive ... fusing the brio of gestural abstraction with the luminous qualities and almost heraldic designs of hard-edge painting."

In 2014, Kyle Fitzpatrick of Los Angeles, I'm Yours characterized Soft Color, a McCord exhibition at LA's The Landing gallery, as "an incredible collection of work."
