= Gerrie Gutmann =

American post-surrealist painter (1921–1969)

- Born: Gerrie Current; 1921; California, U.S.
- Died: 1969 (aged 47–48); San Francisco, California
- Other names: Gerrie von Pribosic Gutmann, Gerrie von Pribosic, Gerrie Bollas
- Education: Stickney Memorial Art School
- Known for: Painting
- Movement: Post-surrealist

Gerrie J. Gutmann, also known as Gerrie Current, Gerrie von Pribosic, Gerrie Bollas (1921–1969) was an American post-surrealist painter from California. The imagery in her paintings was fantasy and often overlapped with autobiographical themes, expressing her struggles for an identity as a woman, an artist, and a mother.

== Early life and education ==
She was born as Gerrie Current in 1921. She studied at the Stickney Memorial Art School in Pasadena in 1939 with painter Lorser Feitelson, a post-surrealist who painted in a more abstract hard-edged style. She was primarily a self taught artist. “[H]er subscription to View and trips to Mexico and Europe...[helped to] familiarized herself with surrealist works.” Feitelson introduced her to artist Viktor von Pribosic (1909–1959), they were married and moved to Oregon however the marriage ended in divorce by 1945. The divorce caused a custody battle over their son, and in much of her work the imagery of childhood and loss are persistent.

== Career ==
Surrealism is visible in Self Portrait (1946) where Gutmann adorns herself with biomorphic forms that suggest female genitalia symbolizing a birth, or rebirth process.

By 1948, she had her first solo exhibition which traveled to multiple locations, including the Gallery Vivienne and Bonestall Gallery (both in New York), and the Harvey Weltch Gallery in Portland Oregon Gutmann was accorded solo shows at the de Young Museum in San Francisco in 1949, 1952, and 1964.

In 1949 she moved to Northern California and married photographer, John Gutmann.

During the 1950s, she rejected the trend among West Coast artists for abstraction over fantastic imagery and so became isolated from other artists. This is due to her having found a style that was best suited to express her inner turmoil and search for an identity as a woman, artist and mother.

“The work of Gutmann along with that of Dorr Bothwell, Eugene Berman and the Post-Surrealists are considered to belong to a broad sphere of illusionistic fantasy loosely termed magic realism. Those who look into her work find that she is more explicitly autobiographical and provided a release from the difficulties of her life- her abandonment by her father, the loss of her son, failed marriages, and alcoholism.

Gerrie Gutmann and John Gutmann divorced in May 1964.

== Death and legacy ==
Gutmann committed suicide in 1969, in her home on Sacramento Street in San Francisco. During her life she had thirteen art exhibitions in museums and galleries in San Francisco, Los Angeles, Santa Barbara, New York and Portland, Oregon.

The San Francisco Museum of Modern Art retains in the permanent collection her painting, Death of the Bullfighter (1952) acquired in 2000 bequest by her second husband John Gutmann. The Los Angeles County Museum of Art (LACMA) has her painting, The Theft (1952) in their collection as gift from David and Jeanne Carlson of the Carlson Gallery.
