= Harold Lehman =

American artist

- Self Portrait, 1933
- Born: 1913; New York, New York
- Died: April 2, 2006 (aged 92–93); Leonia, New Jersey
- Known for: Painter, muralist
- Website: haroldlehman.com

Harold Lehman (1913–2006) was an American artist known for his murals for the Works Progress Administration (WPA).

Lehman was born in 1913 in New York City. He moved to California as a teenager and attended Manual Arts High School in Los Angeles. There he met and became close friends with Jackson Pollock, Philip Guston (formerly Phillip Goldstein), and Reuben Kadish.

In 1931, upon graduating from Manual Arts High School, Lehman won a citywide competition for a sculpture scholarship to Otis Art Institute. He also became interested in the Post-Surrealist movement in Los Angeles and studied under Lorser Feitelson and Helen Lundeberg

In 1932, Lehman became an apprentice to David Alfaro Siqueiros, the Mexican muralist who was in Los Angeles working on a number of projects, including the first large-scale our door mural in the United States, Tropical America," ("La América Tropical".) Lehman joined his group, Block of Painters, working on fresco murals portraying the discrimination and mistreatment of African Americans. All of the mural panels were destroyed the night before the exhibition to the public by the Los Angeles Red Squad.

In 1935, Lehman returned to New York. When Siqueiros came to New York to attend first American Artist's Congress he and Lehman got together and formed the Siqueiros Workshop. As Lehman said, "The basic thing about mural painting is that it’s a message that the artist is giving to the public and, in turn, the message must be received by the public. This kind of give-and-take is an extremely important and valuable one, to both the social and artistic life of this country."

In 1937, Lehman began working for the Federal Art Project. He created the mural Man's Daily Bread for the Riker's Island Prison.

In 1941, he was chosen by the Section of Fine Arts under the US Treasury Department to design a mural for a post office in Renovo, Pennsylvania, "Locomotive Repair Operation"

Moving to Woodstock, NY, in 1941, Lehman became part of the local Woodstock art scene and became good friends with Hervey White, a neighbor that lived down the road. He also began creating posters in 1943 for the US Treasury Department to support War Bond Drives. Artists were commissioned through the Associated American Artists Gallery in New York. It was through the AAA Gallery that Lehman was hired to do several paintings relating to the War. One poster The Paratrooper. became an iconic poster of the day. Two others were used as advertisements to support the War Bond Drive.

In 1946, Lehman returned to New York and taught art at his studio and in 1950 married one of his students, Leona Koutras, with whom he had two children.

Throughout the 1960s - 80's he worked as a Scenic Designer & Scenic Artist in television, movies, and commercials. He also was chief designer of the Coca-Cola Pavilion at the New York World's Fair and later the World of Man at Expo '67 in Montreal Canada.

In 1997 he was interviewed for the Archives of American Art where he discussed his work and close association with fellow artists.

Lehman died on April 2, 2006, in Leonia, New Jersey. His work is in the collection of the National Gallery of Art, where he contributed to the Index of American Design, and in the Smithsonian American Art Museum. His photographic collection is in the United States Holocaust Memorial Museum.

In 1995 his work was included in the exhibition Pacific Dreams: Currents of Surrealism and Fantasy in California Art, 1934-1957 at the Hammer Museum. In 2022 the Pollock-Krasner House and Study Center held an exhibition of Lehman's work entitled Harold Lehman: The Nineteen Thirties.

== Gallery ==
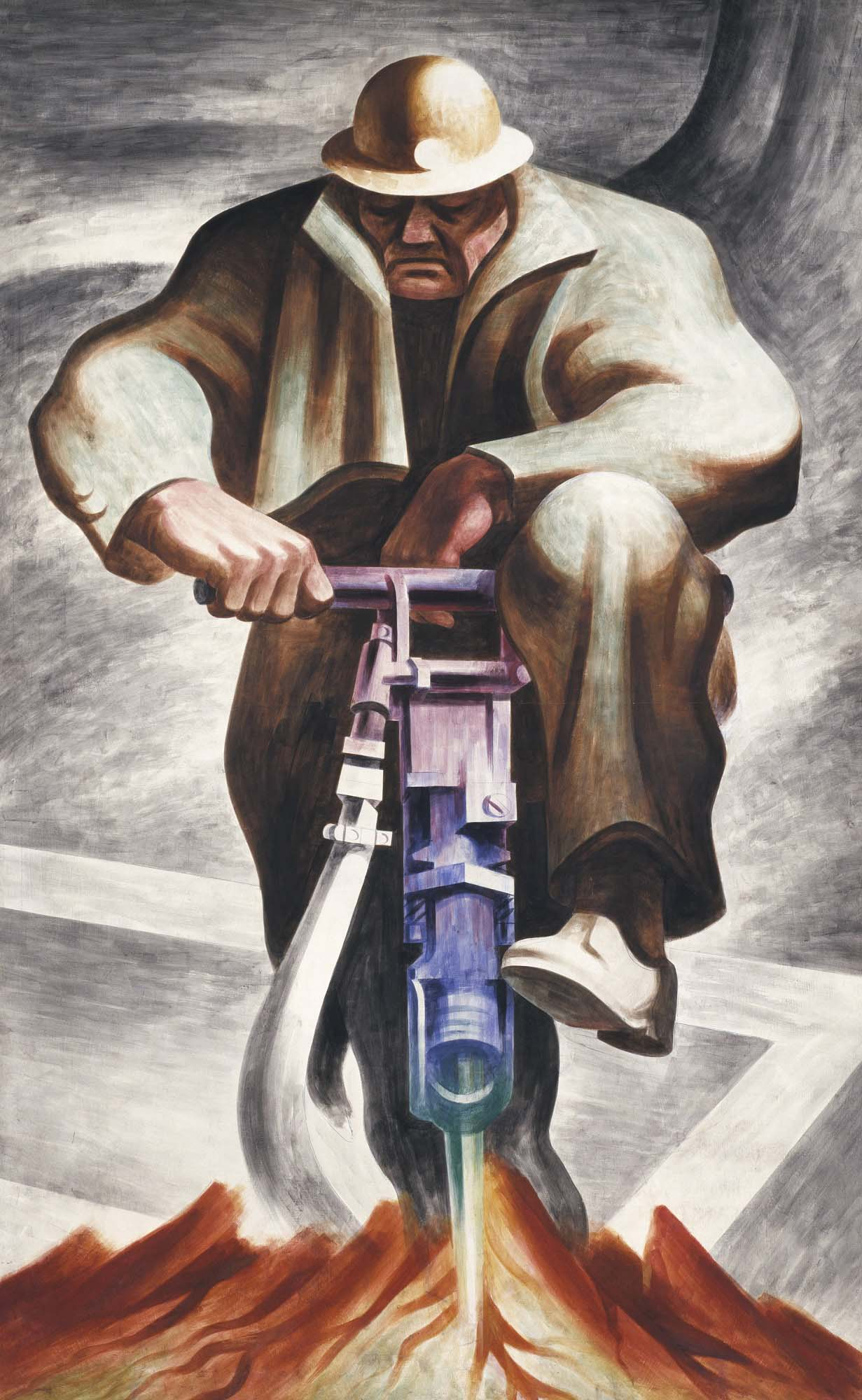
The Driller (mural, Rikers Island, New York), 1937

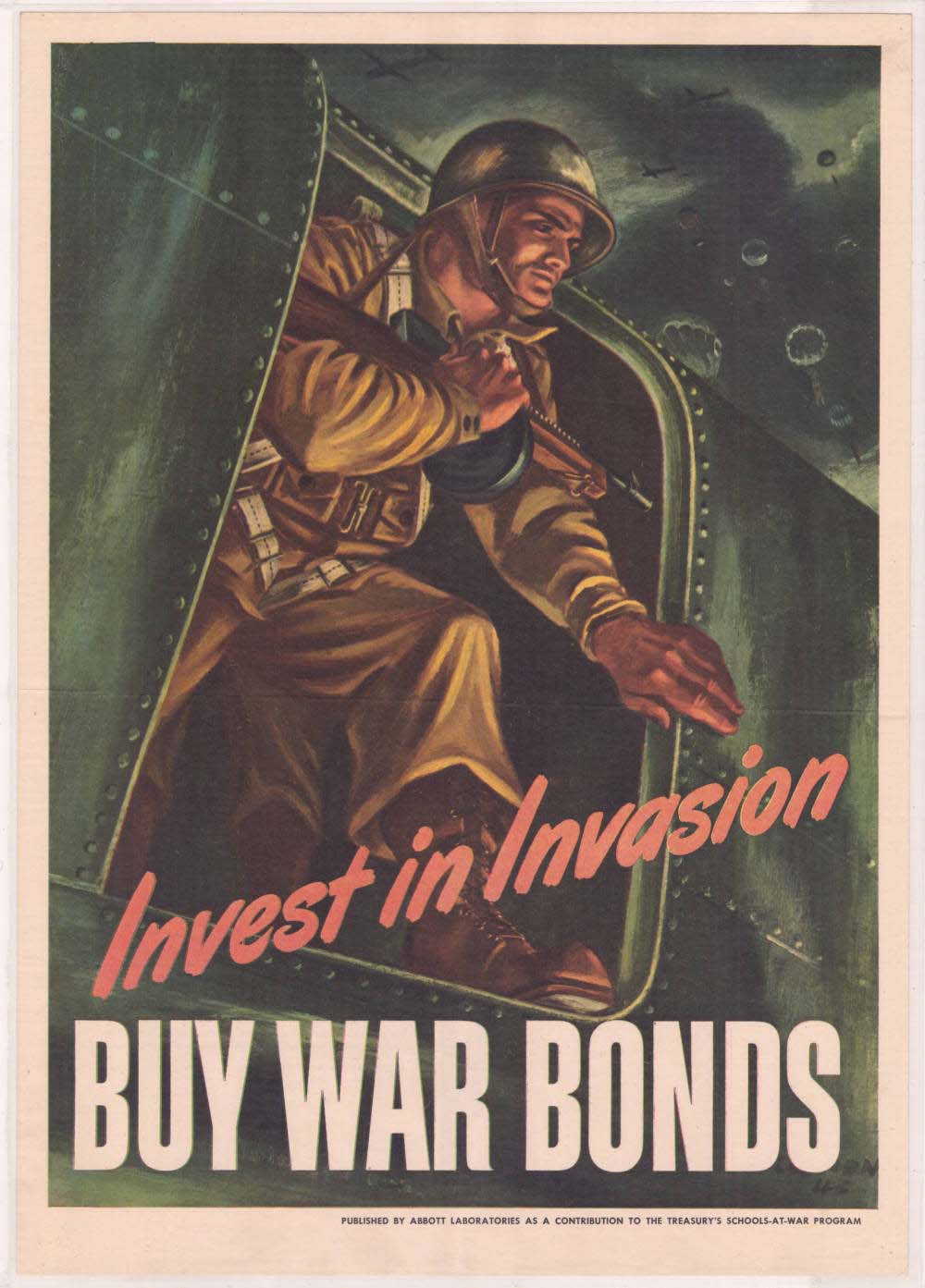
Invest in Invasion, Buy War Bonds, c. 1939-1945
