= Helen Lundeberg =

American painter

- Photo by Frank J. Thomas. Courtesy of the Frank J. Thomas Archives
- Born: June 24, 1908; Chicago, Illinois, U.S.
- Died: April 19, 1999; Los Angeles, California, U.S.
- Education: Stickney Memorial School of Art
- Known for: Painting
- Movement: Post Surrealism, Subjective Classicism, Hard-edge painting
- Spouse: Lorser Feitelson

Helen Lundeberg (1908–1999) was an American painter. Along with her husband Lorser Feitelson, she is credited with establishing the Post-Surrealist movement. Her artistic style changed over the course of her career, and has been described variously as Post-Surrealism, Hard-edge painting and Subjective Classicism.

== Early life and education ==
Lundeberg was born in Chicago in on June 24, 1908, the eldest child of second-generation Swedish parents. In 1912 her family moved to Pasadena, California. As a child, she was an exceptional student and an avid reader. Her intellectual aptitude earned her inclusion in a Stanford University "Study of Gifted Children", which looked at the characteristics and development of children who ranked in the top 1% in California schools. During her early adulthood, Lundeberg's inclination was to become a writer.

In her early life as a painter she would paint portraits of herself, mother, and sister.

== Career ==
In 1930, Lundeberg graduated from Pasadena Junior College. She enrolled in art classes at the Stickney Memorial Art School in Pasadena, where she met professor and fellow painter Lorser Feitelson. Feitelson's dynamic approach to composition and broad ranging interests in the international art scene inspired Lundeberg. In conversation with Fidel Danieli, as part of the UCLA Oral History Project in 1974, Lundeberg explained, "When Lorser came and began to explain things, to make diagrams and to give us principles of different kinds of construction – light dawned! It was really very exciting."

Helen Lundeberg, Portrait of Inez, 1933. Oil on celotex.

In the 1930s, Lundeberg was working in both the social realist and post-surrealist styles. She first exhibited at the Fine Arts Gallery in San Diego in 1931, when she showed her painting Apple Harvesters. In 1933 had her first solo show at the Stanley Rose Gallery in Los Angeles. She and Feitelson married that same year.

Together in 1934, Feitelson and Lundeberg founded Subjective Classicism (or New Classicism), which later became known as Post Surrealism. Using her painting Plant and Animal Analogies as a case study and an ideal, Lundeberg wrote the New Classicism manifesto. Post Surrealism represented the first concentrated response in the US to European Surrealism. Unlike their European counterparts, American Post-Surrealist artists did not rely on random dream imagery. Instead, carefully planned subjects were used to guide the viewer through the painting, gradually revealing a deeper meaning. This method of working appealed to Lundeberg's highly intellectual sensibilities and her engagement with surrealism is present, to varying degrees, in her work throughout the rest of her career.

From 1936 to 1942, Lundeberg was employed by the Works Progress Administration's Federal Art Project, for which she produced lithographs, easel paintings, and murals in the Los Angeles area. Working in oil paint and with a team of four assistants, Lundeberg completed a series of three murals, Preamble to the Constitution, Free Assembly, and Free Ballot for the Bob Hope Patriotic Hall. These murals were removed from the building in the 1970s and are now considered lost. Los Angeles mural painter Kent Twitchell created a new series of murals after the lost Lundeberg murals for the Bob Hope Patriotic Hall during the restoration of the building.

In 1941, the WPA commissioned Lundeberg to paint a mural at the Fullerton City Hall (now the Fullerton Police Department). Lundeberg's mural, History of California, covered three walls of the city council chambers with scenes ranging from the arrival of Spanish explorers to the rise of Hollywood. When the building was converted into police headquarters, the mural was painted over and remained covered until it was restored in 1993.

Also under the auspices of the WPA, Lundeberg completed the mural History of Transportation near the southern border of Edward Vincent, Jr. Park in Inglewood, California. This 8 ft (2.4 m)-high, 241 ft (73 m)-long, mural is made of petrachrome and depicts the history of the Centinela Valley. It includes images of people from all walks of life employing various means of transportation from carriages and steam trains to automobiles and airplanes. After decades of damage, the mural was restored in 2007 and relocated to its present location across from Inglewood High School. The preliminary drawings for this mural are part of the permanent collection of the Nevada Museum of Art.

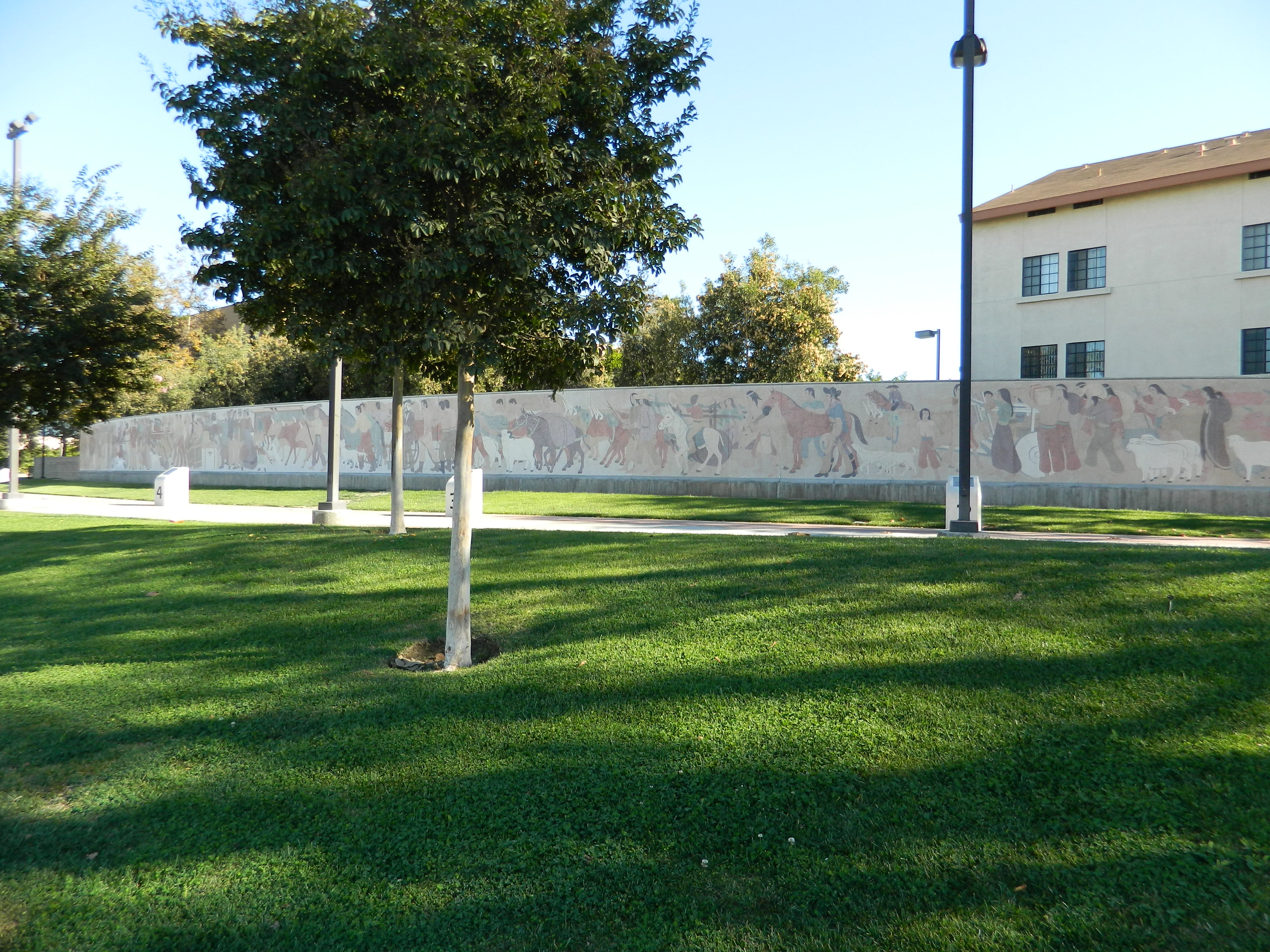
”History of Transportation” now at Grevillea Park

Lundeberg's work with the WPA in Southern California is noteworthy both because her works were well-received and because she was one of only three women artists in Southern California making public artwork for the WPA.

== Move to abstraction ==
Helen Lundeberg, Untitled, 1963. Oil on canvas.

During the 1950s, Lundeberg moved towards geometric abstraction and Hard Edge painting and away from the representational sensibility that had informed her early work. Though always based in reality, Lundeberg created mysterious images that exist somewhere between abstraction and figuration. Repeatedly described as formal and lyrical, Lundeberg's paintings rely on precise compositions that utilize various restricted palettes. Paintings from this period employ the idea of "mood entity", a concept in Post Surrealism that was concerned with evoking states of mind, moods and emotional content unique to each work. Lundeberg and Feitelson were part of a loose group of Post-Surrealists that also included the artists Grace Clements, Philip Guston, Reuben Kadish, Harold Lehman, Lucien Labaudt, Knud Merrild, and Etienne Ret. During this period, Lundeberg was one of the most prolific painters working in Southern California.

In the 1960s and 1970s, Lundeberg continued her journey through abstraction, exploring imagery associated with landscapes, interiors, still life, planetary forms and intuitive compositions. She often revisited compositions or themes in various palettes. In the 1980s, Lundeberg created a series of paintings that deal with landscapes and architectural elements. Her love of the 15th Century Italian Classicists is reflected in many of these works. Throughout her 60-year career, Lundeberg imbued her work with a strong personal vision and a nuanced palette. She created her last known work, the painting Two Mountains, in 1990. In 1999, at the age of 91, Lundeberg died from complications from pneumonia.

== Achievements and legacy ==
In 1949, Lundeberg was awarded the first purchase prize for The Clouds in the "Ninth Invitational Purchase Prize Art Exhibition", sponsored by the Chaffey Community Art Association, California. In 1950, she received the $1,000 First Purchase Award for Spring in the "1950 Annual Exhibition/Artists of Los Angeles and Vicinity." Los Angeles County Museum.

Helen Lundeberg's paintings have been exhibited widely in prominent museums, including the J. Paul Getty Museum in Los Angeles, Whitney Museum of American Art in New York, the San Francisco Museum of Modern Art, the Brooklyn Museum, Los Angeles County Museum of Art, Nora Eccles Harrison Museum of Art at Utah State University and the National Museum of American Art in Washington, D.C. Her work was most recently included in the J. Paul Getty Museum's Pacific Standard Time: Crosscurrents in L.A. Painting and Sculpture, 1950–1970, and in the Los Angeles County Museum of Art exhibition titled In Wonderland: The Surrealist Adventures of Women Artists in Mexico and the United States.

Helen Lundeberg’s estate has been represented exclusively by Louis Stern Fine Arts since 2003. The gallery mounted scholarly monographic exhibitions of Lundeberg’s work in 2004, 2007, and 2019, and mounted joint exhibitions of Feitelson and Lundeberg’s oeuvres in 2011 and 2013.

The American band Sonic Youth have a song called "Helen Lundeberg" on their 2006 album Rather Ripped, whose lyrics list the titles of Lundeberg's paintings included in her exhibition Illusory Landscape at Louis Stern Fine Arts.
