= California Impressionism =

American art movement based in California

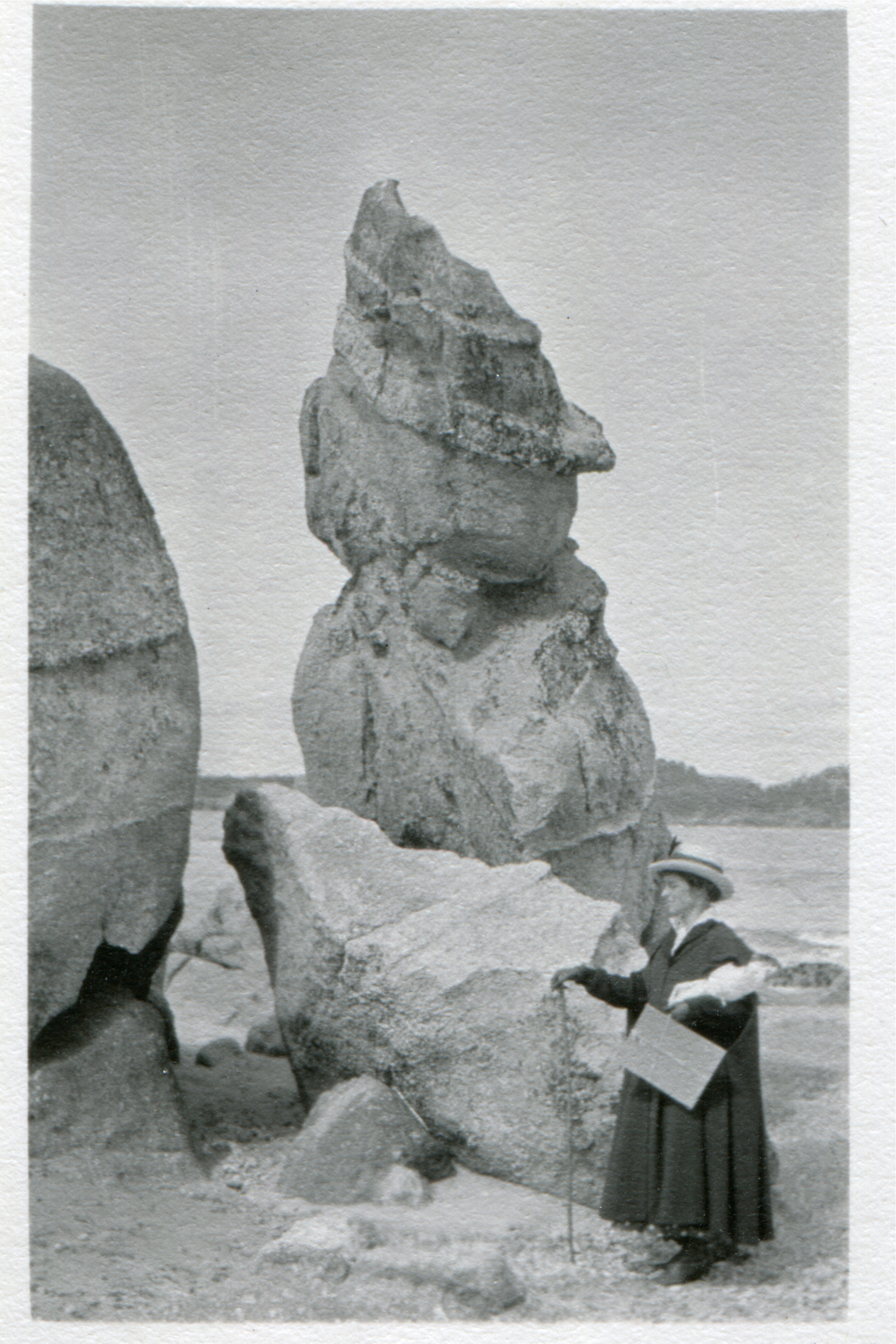
Mary Agnes Yerkes, California Impressionist painter, (1886–1989). "Plein-Air painting at Carmel’’, Carmel Beach, CA, circa 1920s.

The terms California Impressionism and California Plein-Air Painting describe the large art movement of 20th century artists who worked out of doors (en plein air), directly from nature in California, United States. Their work became popular in the San Francisco Bay Area and Southern California in the first three decades after the turn of the 20th century. Considered to be a regional variation on American Impressionism, the California Impressionists are a subset of the California Plein-Air School.

== History ==
The California Impressionist artists depicted the California landscape from the south to the north—the foothills, mountains, seashores, and deserts of the interior and coastal regions. California Impressionism reached its peak of popularity in the years before the Great Depression. The California Impressionists generally painted in a bright, chromatic palette with loose, painterly brushwork that showed influence from French Impressionism and Post-Impressionism. These artists gathered in art colonies in places like Carmel-by-the-Sea and Laguna Beach as well as in cities like San Francisco, Los Angeles, Pasadena, and even Giverny. The artists associated with California Impressionism were influenced by European Impressionism, and members such as Guy Rose and Alson Clark were educated and closely associated with European Impressionists.

Organizations like the California Art Club, the Painters and Sculptors Club, San Francisco's Sketch Club, The Carmel Art Association, The Laguna Beach Art Association and the Los Angeles Museum of History, Art and Science played a key role in popularizing the work of the California Impressionists. While impressionist-influenced painting remained popular in California well after it did in Europe or the Eastern United States, in the late 1920s, impressionism was seen as old-fashioned and conservative. In the 1930s, more modern styles became accepted, and the movement fell into decline.

== Artists ==
In the 1890s, European ideas and painting techniques finally made their way to the west coast of the United States. We call the group of artists who responded to these ideas the California Impressionists, but that is not a name that they self-applied. Charles Desmarais, director of the Laguna Art Museum, noted that this phrase "is a misnomer if it implies any but the most tenuous connections to the theory-based art born in France decades before".

Patricia Trenton argued that the "common thread that binds these artists is the recognition and depiction of light through color, an interest fostered in part by the dissemination of the color theories of Michel-Eugene Chevreul and Albert Henry Munsell. But... these artists were inspired by the clarity and force of the distinctive light of Southern California and by the region's endlessly intriguing motives of hill and meadow, desert and mountain, river and ocean".

Most of the Plein Air painters came from the East, the Midwest and Europe, and only a few of the early artists such as Guy Rose were actually born and raised in California. Most of these artists were already trained in art when they moved to California, arriving between 1900 and the early 1920s, although many continued their education in California. These artists worked together and showed together frequently.

- Franz Bischoff,
- Arthur Cane (1865–1949),
- Alson S. Clark,
- Leland Curtis,
- John Marshall Gamble,
- Armin Hansen,
- Sam Hyde Harris,
- Anna Althea Hills,
- Carl Jonnevold,
- Charles Chapel Judson,
- Jean Mannheim,
- Edgar Payne,
- Hanson Puthuff,
- Granville Redmond,
- William Ritschel,
- Donna N. Schuster
- Channel Pickering Townsley,
- Grace Vollmer,
- Marion Wachtel,
- John Edward Walker,
- William Wendt,
- Julia Bracken Wendt,
- Shirley Williamson,
- Jack Wilkinson Smith.

== Northern California Tonalism and Impressionism ==
Many of the Northern California painters were influenced by the works of the French painters of the Barbizon School, who worked in the forest south of Paris in the mid-19th century, as well as the American landscape master George Inness (1825–1894) and the American expatriate James Abbott McNeill Whistler (1834–1903). Northern California Tonalist landscapes can be recognized by their simplified compositions and a limited palette that gave the paintings close color harmonies. Some of the other major Northern California Tonalists were Arthur and Lucia Mathews, who led the Bay Area Arts and Crafts Movement, the moonlight painter Charles Rollo Peters (1862–1928), the flamboyant Xavier Martinez (1869–1943), and the painter and muralist Giuseppe Cadenasso (1858–1918). While many of the Northern California tonalist painters did paint extensively out of doors, most of the works were done in their studio, stylized and poetic visions, a step away from the plein air or impressionist painting favored by the French school.

After 1915 and the Panama–Pacific International Exposition, which brought many French and American Impressionist masterworks to San Francisco, more Northern California painters adopted a more chromatic palette and dappled brushwork that was closer to French Impressionism and they adopted high-key midday subjects. Some of the best known Northern California painters who worked in a more impressionistic manner were the marine painter Armin Hansen, the coastal landscape painter Bruce Nelson and E. Charlton Fortune (1885–1969), a talented Monterey woman who gave up easel painting for ecclesiastical decoration. Joseph Raphael, a student of Arthur Mathews who lived for many years in Europe while maintaining ties to San Francisco, assayed methods of Impressionism and Post-Impressionism, and may have been "the finest and most original of the state's Impressionists."

E. Charlton Fortune helped to develop the Carmel area art colony, bringing William Merritt Chase there to teach. Two of the most prominent California Impressionists who lived in Carmel were William Ritschel and Paul Dougherty. Both were known for their marine subjects, and had developed national reputations long before they moved west.

== Southern California Impressionism ==
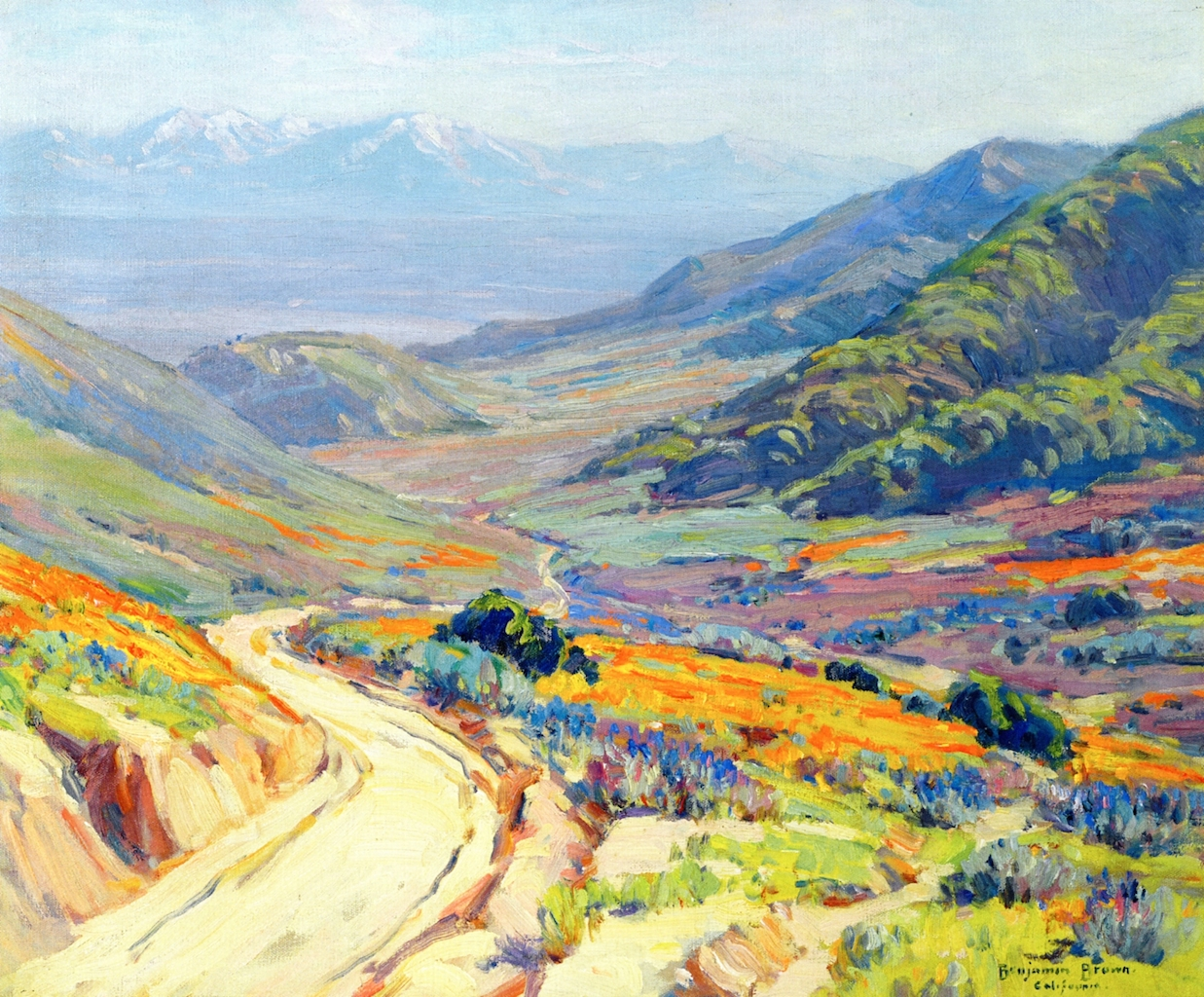
Poppies, Antelope Valley by Benjamin Chambers Brown

Los Angeles developed more slowly than San Francisco, where the California Gold Rush caused the rapid expansion of its wealth and art scene, so there were few artists and even fewer collectors in the years before the turn of the 20th century. As first the Painters Club (1906) and then the California Art Club (1909) were founded and the first commercial galleries opened, Southern California began to draw artists and patrons and a bright, airy Impressionist aesthetic became dominant. This coincided with a tremendous population boom in Southern California. From early in the 20th century, Southern California painters generally worked in a much higher key then their Northern California contemporaries. This seems almost natural, for the Southland was a land of almost perpetual sunshine. The painters didn't need the earth tones that were favored by the Northern California painters and instead adopted a broad, chromatic palette that helped them to capture the brilliant light that bathed the hills and valleys of Southern California. William Wendt was a bold stylist known for his paintings of California in the springtime. The Austrian Franz Bischoff and the German-born Jean Mannheim were both converts to California Impressionism. Guy Rose, whose father was a leading rancher was a Los Angeles native who was trained in San Francisco and Paris and while in France he became an enthusiastic proponent of Impressionism. He only came home in 1914, after years of living in the Giverny art colony. Also Paris-trained, Benjamin Brown, whose work suggested an Impressionism reminiscent of Childe Hassam, settled in California in the 1890s.

Mid-Western born and educated Fernand Lungren (1859-1932), after stays in Philadelphia, New York, Cincinnati and Europe, moved West to Santa Fe, New Mexico, finally settling in Santa Barbara, California, in 1906. He is especially famous for his impressionist paintings of the California desert in various seasons and time of the day; he also played a leading role in founding the Santa Barbara School of the Arts in 1920.

Perhaps the most well-known Impressionist painter to settle in Southern California was Richard E. Miller. Miller came to Pasadena to teach alongside Rose, with whom he had worked in Giverny. His color and draftsmanship had a profound influence on other California artists.

After studying with Chase in New York and then going to Europe, Maurice Braun moved to San Diego in 1909. His patterned landscapes are notable for their sparkling sunlight and subtle mysticism. For William H. Gerdts, Braun was "not only the finest Impressionist of the San Diego area, but arguably the most brilliant landscape artist of his generation working in California."

== Decline of California Impressionism ==
The decline of the California Plein-Air Movement was gradual. While art historians have described California Impressionism's long popularity as "the Indian summer of American Impressionism," the movement eventually began to give way to more modern movements, both in the press and among collectors. The Great Depression hurt the art market. The economy hastened the decline of plein-air painting, and modernism began to supplant the artists of the Southland art organizations.

== Revival of interest in early California Impressionism ==
Interest in the California Impressionists began to wane in the late 1920s. When the Southland painters of the 1920s were discussed, they were sometimes derisively called The Eucalyptus School. Led by a number of pioneering art historians like Nancy Moure, then with the Los Angeles County Museum of Art in Southern California and Harvey Jones of the Oakland Museum of California in Northern California, writers began to recognize that a major movement of Impressionist-influenced painters had been active in California between 1900 and 1930. Interest in California's impressionist painters was aided by the historic preservation movement and interest in the Arts and Crafts Movement in California.

As interest in the American Arts and Crafts Movement increased and historic preservation became popular, young curators, art historians and art dealers began to mount exhibitions and write about the California Impressionists. By the 1980s, there was a broad interest in California Impressionism. Under the direction of Jean Stern, expert on California Impressionism, The Peterson Galleries in Beverly Hills hosted retrospective exhibitions for Franz Bischoff and other artists of the Plein-Air school with small color catalogs, signaling that the early painters of Los Angeles were worthy of both scholarly and commercial attention. In 1977 the Laguna Art Museum hosted a retrospective for William Wendt, the most important figure in early Los Angeles painting, which was curated by Nancy Moure. The following year Moure released her Dictionary of Art and Artists in Southern California Before 1930. Moure also curated a retrospective exhibition for the Laguna Beach Museum with illustrations of works by dozens of painters who had been active there.

In 1981 in conjunction with the Los Angeles Bicentennial, an exhibition of early California painting was held at the Los Angeles County Museum of Art. In 1982 Plein-Air Painters of California: The Southland was published by Ruth Lilly Westphal. Westphal followed the first book with Plein-Air Painters of California: The North, in 1986. These books are still in print and played an instrumental role in the revival of interest in these painters.

=== Continued influence ===
The California Impressionists continue to show their influence in museum exhibits, high auction prices, and in events that continue their working methods. A posthumous 2021 exhibit at Casa Romantica highlighted Sam Hyde Harris' career as a commercial artist. In a 2022 auction, a piece by Guy Rose sold for $441,375.

A key component of the continued interest in the California Impressionists are the frequent en plein air exhibitions held in California that continue their artistic practice. In most of these exhibitions, the painters bring their materials and blank canvasses or panels on which to paint. Then, they have a specified number of hours or days to complete their works before an exhibition is held. This type of exhibition is largely credited to Denise Burns and the Plein-Air Painters of America and the early exhibitions that it promoted on Catalina Island. The concept was conceived of as a way to emphasize the spontaneous nature of en plein air painting, the way that paintings are executed in a number of hours, while conditions stay consistent. In addition to the popular shows on Catalina Island, the philanthropist and art collector Joan Irvine Smith sponsored en plein air shows that were organized by the California Art Club at Mission San Juan Capistrano. Capistrano had been a popular location for the California Impressionists of the 1920s and these exhibitions were very successful for both the artists and collectors. Other en plein air festivals were held in Carmel-by-the-Sea and Santa Ana, California.

== See also ==
- American Barbizon school
- California Plein-Air School
- California Scene Painting

== Sources ==
- Moure, Nancy, Morseburg, Jeffrey, Read, Nat B., The Art of the Jonathan Club, Jonathan Art Foundation, 2010
- California's Landscapes and Legacy Burlington Center for the Arts, 2009 (CAC Exhibition Catalog)
- California Art Club: 99th Annual Gold Medal Juried Exhibition, 2010 (CAC Exhibition Catalog)
- On Location in Malibu 2009: Paintings by the California Art Club Exhibition Catalogue
- California Art Club: 98th Annual Gold Medal Juried Exhibition, 2009 (CAC Exhibition Catalog)
- California Art Club: 97th Annual Gold Medal Juried Exhibition, 2008 (CAC Exhibition Catalog)
- California Art Club: 96th Annual Gold Medal Juried Exhibition, 2007 (CAC Exhibition Catalog)
- California Art Club: 95th Annual Gold Medal Juried Exhibition, 2006 (CAC Exhibition Catalog)
- Davenport, Ray, Davenport's Art Reference: The Gold Edition, 2005 (Dictionary)
- California Art Club: 94th Annual Gold Medal Juried Exhibition, 2004 (CAC Exhibition Catalog)
- California Art Club: 93rd Annual Gold Medal Juried Exhibition, 2003 (CAC Exhibition Catalog)
- California Art Club: 92nd Annual Gold Medal Juried Exhibition, 2002 (CAC Exhibition Catalog)
- California Art Club: 91st Annual Gold Medal Juried Exhibition, 1999 (CAC Exhibition Catalog)
- Stern, Jean,Treasures of the Sierra Nevada, Natural History Museum of Los Angeles County, California Art Club, 1998 (Exhibition Catalog)
- Adams, Peter & Adams Elaine, East Coast Ideals, West Coast Concepts, Carnegie Museum, Oxnard, California Introduction by Suzanne Bellah, CAC, 1997 (Exhibition Catalog)
- Easton, Ellen, Ranchos: Santa Barbara Land Grant Ranchos, The Easton Gallery, Santa Barbara, 1996 (Exhibition Catalog)
- Landauer, Susan. “The California Art Club: A History (1909–1995).” American Art Review 8 (February–March 1996): 144–51.
- Moure, Nancy Dustin Wall. "Loners, Mavericks and Dreamers; Art in Los Angeles before 1900". Laguna Beach, Calif.: Laguna Art Museum, 1993
- Trenton, Patricia & Gerdts, William, California Light: 1900–1930, Laguna Beach Museum of Art, Exhibition Catalog, Chronicle Books, San Francisco, 1992 (Exhibition Catalog)
- Westphal, Ruth Lilly, Editor, Plein-Air Painters of California: The North, Westphal Publishing, Irvine, California 1986
- Westphal, Ruth Lilly, Editor, Plein-Air Painters of California: The South, Westphal Publishing, Irvine, California 1984
- Morseburg, Jeffrey, California Painting During the Arts and Crafts Period, Style 1900 Magazine, Volume 10, Number 2, 1991
- Moure, Nancy Dustin Wall. Publications in Southern California Art, 1, 2, and 3. Los Angeles: Dustin Publications, 1984.
- Stern, Jean. “California Impressionism Chosen for Corporate Offices in Arizona,” Western Art Digest 12 (November–December 1985): 72–80.
- Moure, Nancy Dustin Wall. Painting and Sculpture in Los Angeles, 1900–1945. Los Angeles: Los Angeles County Museum, 1980
- Moure, Nancy Dustin Wall. William Wendt, 1865–1946. Laguna Beach, Calif.: Laguna Art Museum, 1977.
- Burlingame, Margaret R. “The Laguna Beach Group.” American Magazine of Art 24 (April 1932): 259–66.
- Vreeland, Francis William. “A New Art Centre for the Pacific Coast,” Arts and Decoration 28 (November 1927): 64–65.
- Berry, Rose, "A Patriarch of Pasadena [Benjamin Brown]". International Studio 81 (May 1925): 123–26.
- Berry, Rose, “A Painter of California [Guy Rose].” International Studio 80 (January 1925): 332–34, 336–37.
- Robinson, W. W. “The Laguna Art Colony.” California Southland 6 (July 1924): 10.
- Berry, Rose V. S. “California and Some California Painters.” American Magazine of Art 15 (June 1924): 279–91.
- “California as Presented by Her Artists,” California Southland 6 (June 1924): 7–13.
- Brown, Benjamin Chambers. “The Beginnings of Art in Los Angeles.” California Southland 6 (January 1924): 7–8.
- “A California School of Painters.” California Southland 3 (February 1921): 10–11.
- Downes, William Howe. “California for the Landscape Painter.” American Magazine of Art 11 (December 1920): 491–502.
- Usher, B. D. “California Art Exhibit.” Holly Leaves, April 26, 1919.
- Neuhaus, Eugen. The Galleries of the Exposition: A Critical Review of the Paintings, Statuary, and the Graphic Arts in the Palace of Fine Arts at the Panama–Pacific International Exposition. San Francisco. Paul Elder and Company, 1915.
- “California as a Sketching Ground.” International Studio 43 (April 1911): 121–32.
- Seares, Mabel Urmy. “The Spirit of California Art.” Sunset 23 (September 1909): 264–266.
- Donovan, Elleen Dwyer. “California Artists and Their Work.” Overland Monthly 51 (January 1908): 25–33.
