= Grace Clements =

Grace Clements may refer to:

- Grace Clements (athlete) (born 1984), English athlete
- Grace Clements (artist) (1905–1969), American painter, mosaicist, and art writer
