= Jean Mannheim =

German-American painter

- Born: November 18, 1863; Bad Kreuznach, Kingdom of Prussia
- Died: September 6, 1945 (aged 81); Pasadena, California, U.S.
- Years active: 1880s–1940s
- Known for: painting
- Spouse(s): Pauline McNett (divorced), Eunice Drennan (1902–1910, her death)

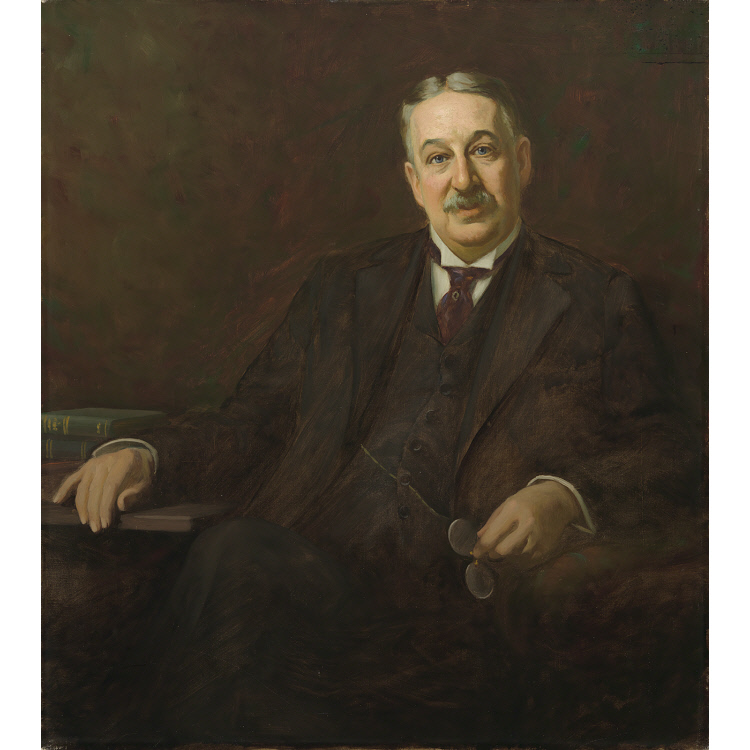
King Camp Gillette (1911), oil painting by Jean Mannheim in the National Portrait Gallery

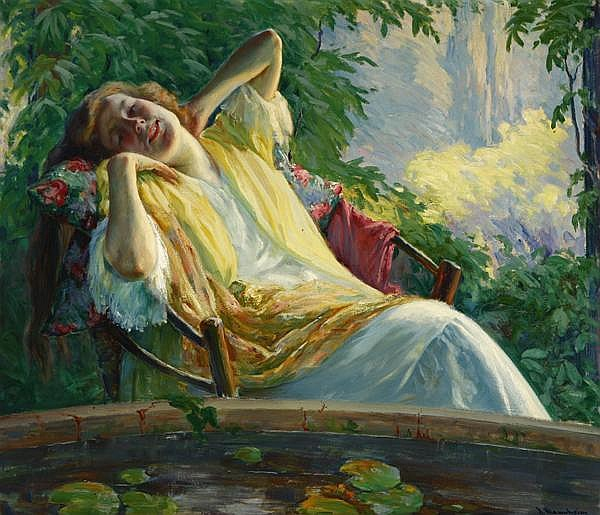
Happiness (date unknown, c. 1930s), oil painting by Jean Mannheim

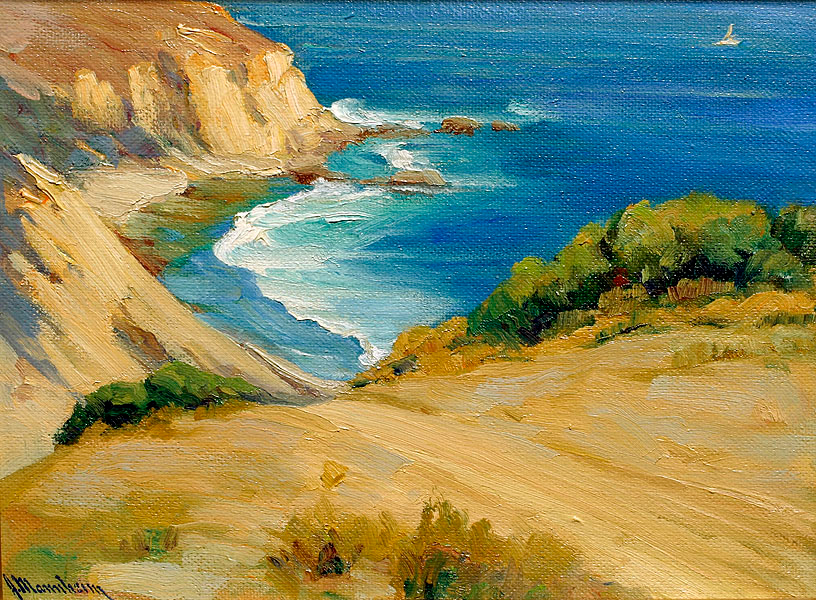
Irvine Cove – Laguna Beach, California (c. 1930), oil painting by Jean Mannheim

Jean Mannheim (November 18, 1863 – September 6, 1945) was a German-born American artist and educator, known for his California Impressionist paintings. He was active in Decatur, Illinois, and Pasadena, California.

== About ==
Jean Mannheim was born November 18, 1863, in Bad Kreuznach in the Kingdom of Prussia. He was drafted into the German Army, and eventually he fled to France. In Paris, he studied art at Académie Delécluse and Académie Colarossi, and under artists Paul-Louis Delance and William-Adolphe Bouguereau.

In 1884, he immigrated to Illinois where he taught at the Decatur Art School. His students in Decatur included artists Roy Brown and Charles Crocker. In the 1880s, he married Pauline McNett from the small city Mendota, but the marriage ended in divorce. In 1902, he married Eunice Drennan of Decatur, the sister of John Drennan, longtime publisher of the Decatur Daily Review. This was followed by a two-year position at Frank Brangwyn's school in London and a stint teaching at the Denver Art School in 1903.

In 1908, Mannheim and his wife settled in Pasadena, California. In 1909, Mannheim built his house and art studio at 500 South Arroyo Boulevard, and the area was a popular location for many of his landscape paintings. He lived nearby Ernest A. Batchelder. He was a member of the California Art Club.

In 1912, the opening of the Stickney Memorial Art School was led by Mannheim and Channel Pickering “C.P.” Townsley. The school was in operation until 1934. Students of Mannheim's in Los Angeles included Marie Boening Kendall and Effie Anderson Smith, amongst others.

He died September 6, 1945, in Pasadena, California. Mannheim's great-grandson wrote a biography, From a Versatile Brush: The Life and Art of Jean Mannheim (2011).

== See also ==
- Artists of the Arroyo Seco (Los Angeles)
