= Stickney Memorial Art School =

Former art school in Pasadena, California

- Pasadena, California, U.S.

Information
- Other names: Stickney Art Institute, Stickney Memorial School of Art; Stickney Memorial School of Fine Arts
- School type: Art school
- Established: 1912
- Closed: 1934

Stickney Memorial Art School, also known as Stickney Art Institute and Stickney Memorial School of Fine Arts, was an art school in operation between 1912 and 1934 in Pasadena, California. The school was an early precursor to the Norton Simon Museum, which was founded in 1969.

== History ==
Upon opening in 1912, the school was led by Jean Mannheim and Channel Pickering Townsley. In the early years of the school, Townsley served as director and Mannheim served as the sole instructor; the school offered summer classes with a costumed model posed in the open air and offered outdoor landscape painting in winter. It also offered charcoal drawing, pen-and-ink drawing, and still life drawing.

It was originally located at Stickney Hall, on the corner of Fair Oaks Avenue and Lincoln Avenue in Pasadena (now the 134 and 210 freeways), built and donated by Susan Homer Stickney in memory of her sister. In 1934, the original location was razed and a new location was established at Carmelita Gardens. The school changed its name to the Pasadena Art Institute.

In the 1930s, artist Lorser Feitelson joined the faculty, and it was at the school where he met pupil Helen Lundeberg; they would later marry and work as artistic collaborators. Together in 1934, Feitelson and Lundeberg founded Subjective Classicism (or New Classicism), which later became known as Post-Surrealism. Another one of Feitelson's students was painter Gerrie Gutmann. Modernist painter Grace Clements, a member of Feitelson and Lundeberg's Post Surrealism group, also taught at the school.

The Pasadena Art Institute changed its name to the Pasadena Art Museum in 1954, and eventually became the Norton Simon Museum.

== Notable alumni ==
- Gerrie Gutmann
- Sam Hyde Harris (1889– 1977)
- Kathryn Leighton (1875–1952)
- Helen Lundeberg
- Ruth Miller
- F. Carl Smith (1868–1955),
- Harry Tillcock (1882–1973)
- Grace Vollmer

== Notable faculty ==
- Mildred Bryant Brooks (1901–1995)
- Alson S. Clark
- Grace Clements
- Roland Coate
- Lorser Feitelson
- Gordon Kaufmann
- Lucile Lloyd, also served as director.
- Jean Mannheim (1861–1945)
- Richard Edward Miller
- Guy Rose, also served as director.
- Channel Pickering Townsley

== See also ==
- California Art Club, many of the alumni and faculty were members
