= Jean Stern =

Jean Stern may refer to:

- Jean Stern (fencer) (1875–1962), French épée fencer
- Jean Stern (art historian) (born 1946), art historian and museum director
