= Mildred Bryant Brooks =

American printmaker, muralist (1901–1995)

- Born: Mildred Bryant; July 21, 1901; Maryville, Missouri, U.S.
- Died: July 3, 1995 (aged 93); Santa Barbara, California, U.S.
- Education: University of Southern California (BA), Otis Art Institute, Chouinard Art Institute
- Occupations: Printmaker, teacher
- Known for: Etcher, aquatinter, muralist
- Spouse: Don J. Brooks

Mildred Bryant Brooks (1901–1995) was an American printmaker, and teacher. She taught at Stickney Memorial Art School for many years, and was a co-founder of The Six Print Club. She was known for her etchings the California landscape and trees.

== Early life and education ==
Mildred Bryant Brooks was born on July 21, 1901, in Maryville, Missouri. She was the daughter of Millie (née Davis), and J. Jay Bryant. The Bryant family moved in 1907 to Long Beach, California. She attended Long Beach High School (now Long Beach Polytechnic High School).

Brooks graduated with a bachelor's degree in art from the University of Southern California (USC); and continued studies after her graduation at the Otis Art Institute (now Otis College of Art and Design), and Chouinard Art Institute. She studied under Arthur Millier, Frank Tolles Chamberlin, and Earl Stetson Crawford.

She was married to Don J. Brooks.

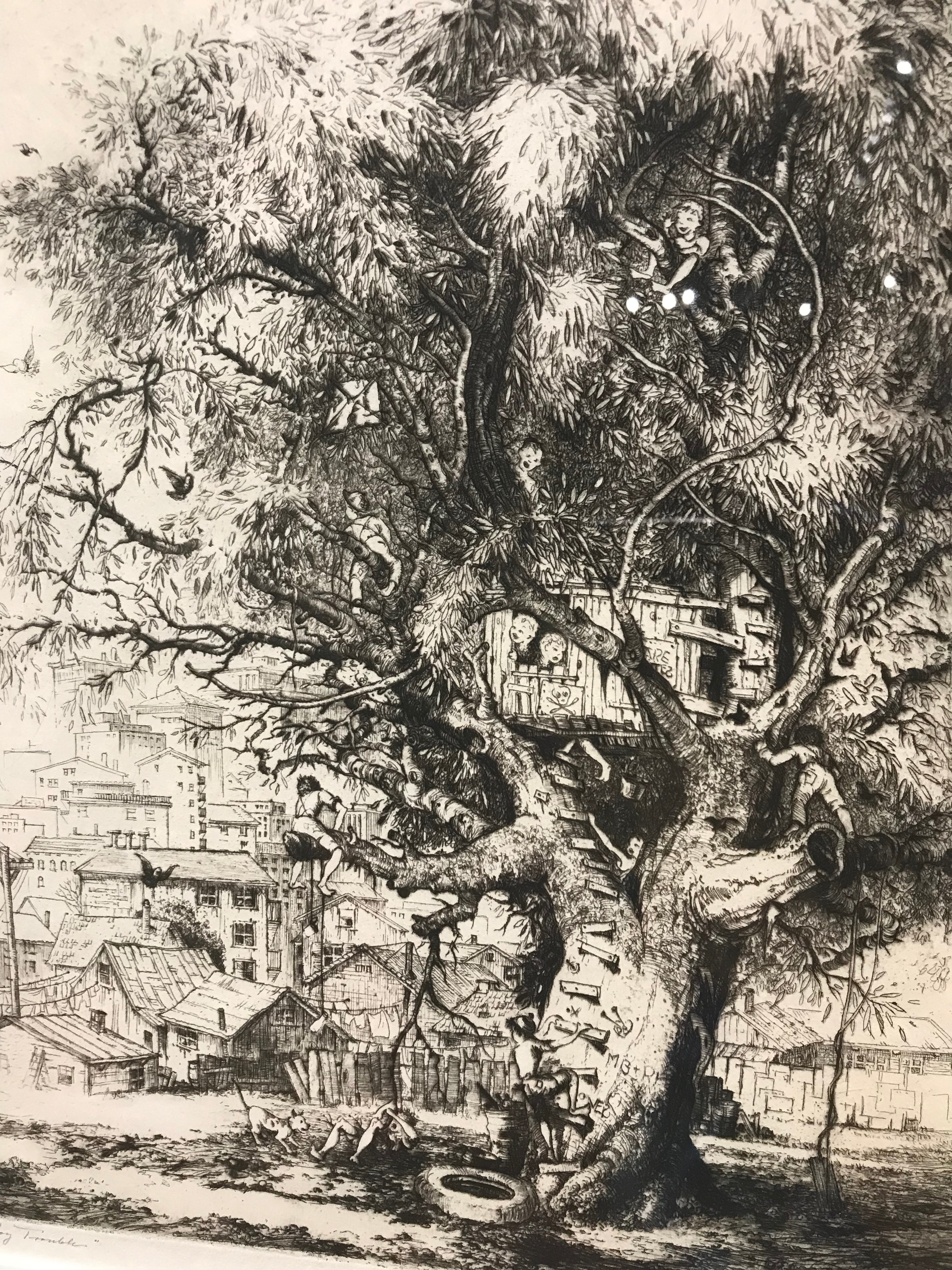
Boy Trouble by Mildred Bryant Brooks, undated

== Career ==
Starting in 1929, Brooks learned etching, and began teaching at Stickney Memorial Art School in Pasadena, California.

The Six Print Club was a fine art prints subscription service, founded in 1932 by Brooks, Arthur Millier, Margaret Kidder, A. Simon, Jane McDuffle Thurston, and Martha Simmons. In the 1930s, she became known as the "best etchers of trees" nationally, after it was stated a 1936 article in the Los Angeles Times. In 1936, Brooks had a solo exhibition at the Smithsonian Institution in Washington, D.C.. During World War II, she left printmaking and started focusing her work in mural painting.

She died on July 3, 1995, in Santa Barbara, California. Her work can be found in museum collections, including the Smithsonian American Art Museum, the National Gallery of Art in Washington, D.C., the San Luis Obispo Museum of Art, the New York Public Library Print Collection, the Los Angeles County Museum of Art, the Dayton Art Institute, the Cleveland Museum of Art, the Jordan Schnitzer Museum of Art, and the Laguna Art Museum.
