= Alson S. Clark =

American painter (1876–1949)

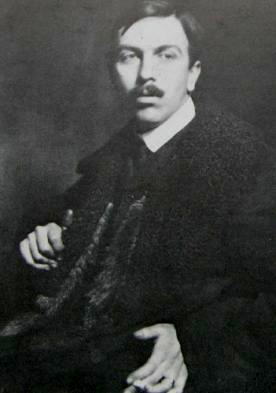
- Alson S. Clark (date unknown)
- Born: Alson Skinner Clark; March 25, 1876; Chicago, Illinois, U.S.
- Died: March 23, 1949 (aged 72); Pasadena, California, U.S.
- Known for: Landscape painting, Photography
- Movement: American Impressionism, impressionism
- Spouse: Atta Medora McMullin

Alson Skinner Clark (March 25, 1876 – March 23, 1949) was an American Impressionist painter best remembered for his landscapes. He was also a photographer, plein aire painter, art educator and muralist.

== Early life and education ==
On March 25, 1876, he was born in Chicago, Illinois to a wealthy family. He showed early artistic talent and by age 11 he was taking art classes at Art Institute of Chicago. His art education included training at the Académie Julian (1899). In addition he studied in the atelier of William Merritt Chase and Chase School of Art and Académie Carmen with James McNeill Whistler.

== Career ==
He spent much of his early career working in Paris, France and served in the United States Army as an aerial photographer during World War I. In the 1920s, he taught fine art at Occidental College, and by 1919 he was director of the Stickney Memorial Art School in Pasadena.

His memberships in arts organizations included the Pasadena Society of Artists and the California Art Club. His work was included in the Tonal Impressionism exhibition curated by Harry Muir Kurtzworth in 1937, along with the works of Frank Tenney Johnson, Frank Tolles Chamberlain, and Theodore Lukits which was held in the Los Angeles Art Association Gallery at the Los Angeles Public Library.

=== Murals ===
In addition to landscape paintings, he painted murals for the Carthay Circle Theatre in Los Angeles, and the fire curtain of the Pasadena Playhouse, depicting a Spanish galleon in full sail.

A group of murals completed in 1929 can still be seen at the former 1st Trust & Savings Bank at 587 East Colorado Boulevard in Pasadena, California. The murals consist of four panels standing approximately ten feet in height, each depicting a major southern California industry: oil drilling, citrus farming, the movies, and shipping.

== Personal life ==
In 1898, he traveled to France and, in 1902, returned to the United States. In 1920, he married Atta Medora McMullin (1881–1962). Immediately after, he and his wife moved to the Arroyo Seco area in Pasadena, California.

On March 23, 1949, he died while painting in his studio in Pasadena, California. He was 72 years old.

== Publications ==
- Stern, Jean (1983). Alson S. Clark. Petersen. ISBN 978-0-8227-8042-7.
- Epstein Solon, Deborah (2005). An American Impressionist: The Art and Life of Alson Skinner Clark. Pasadena Museum of California Art, Hudson Hills Press. ISBN 978-1555952440.

== Selected paintings ==
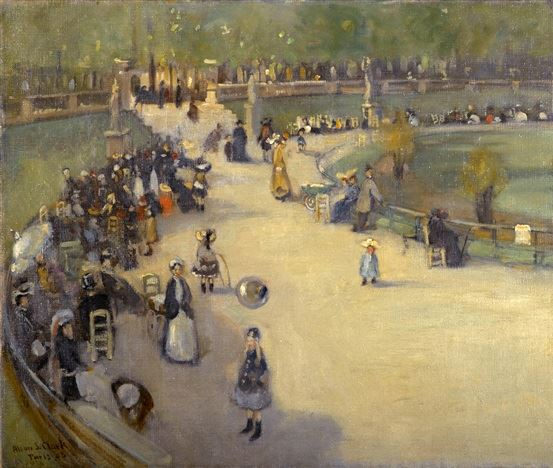
Luxembourg Gardens

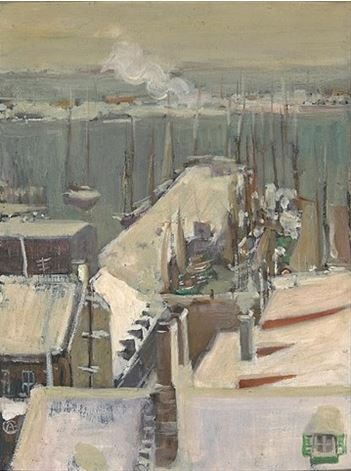
Frozen Basin, Quebec

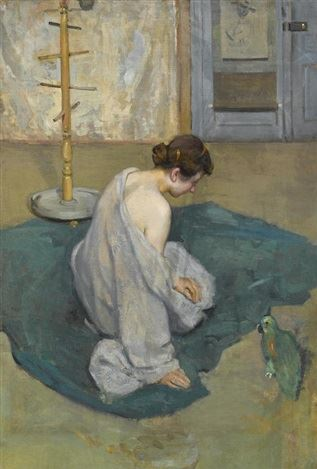
In the Studio

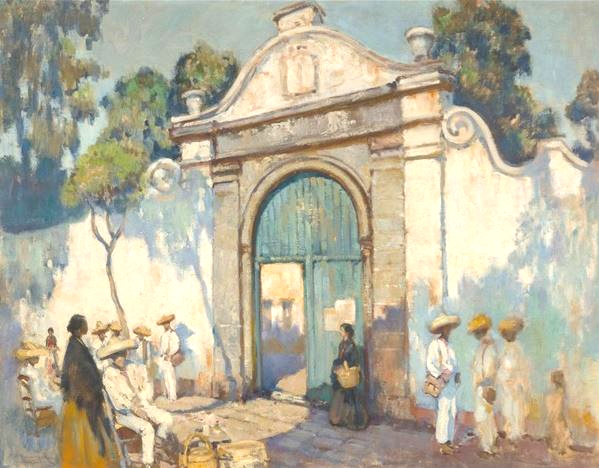
Figures Outside the Mission Wall

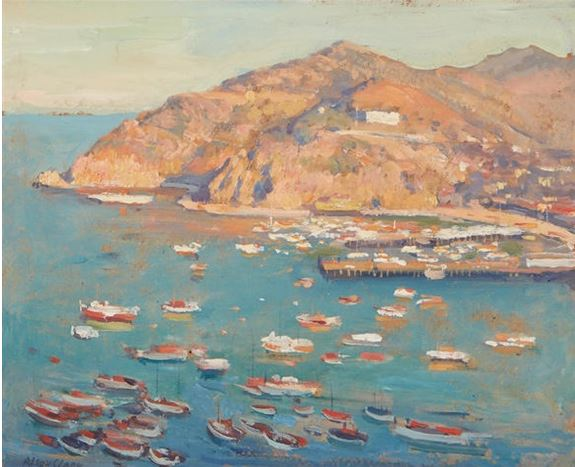
Catalina Bay

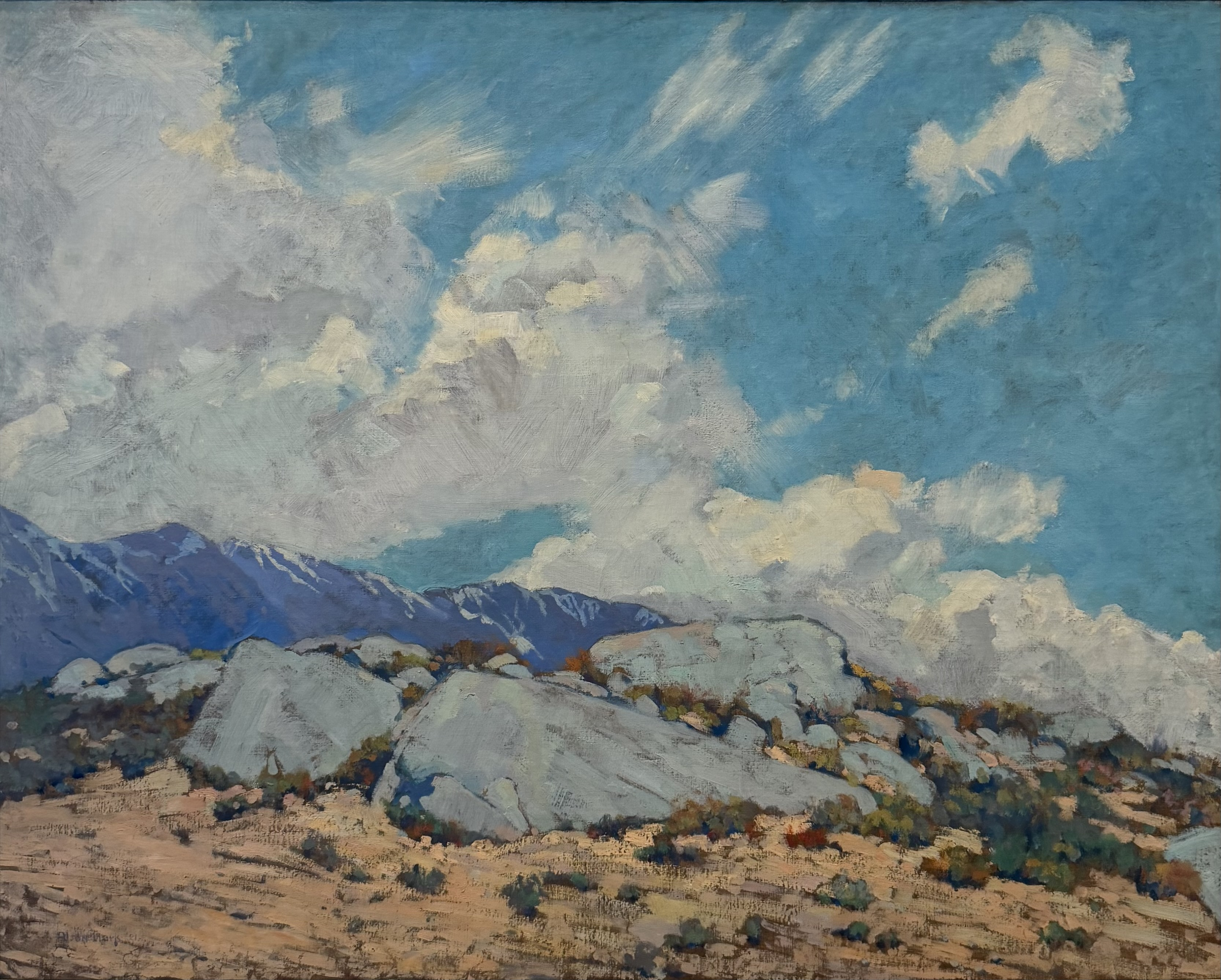
California Mountains

== See also ==
- Stickney Memorial Art School
