= Marie Boening Kendall =

American painter

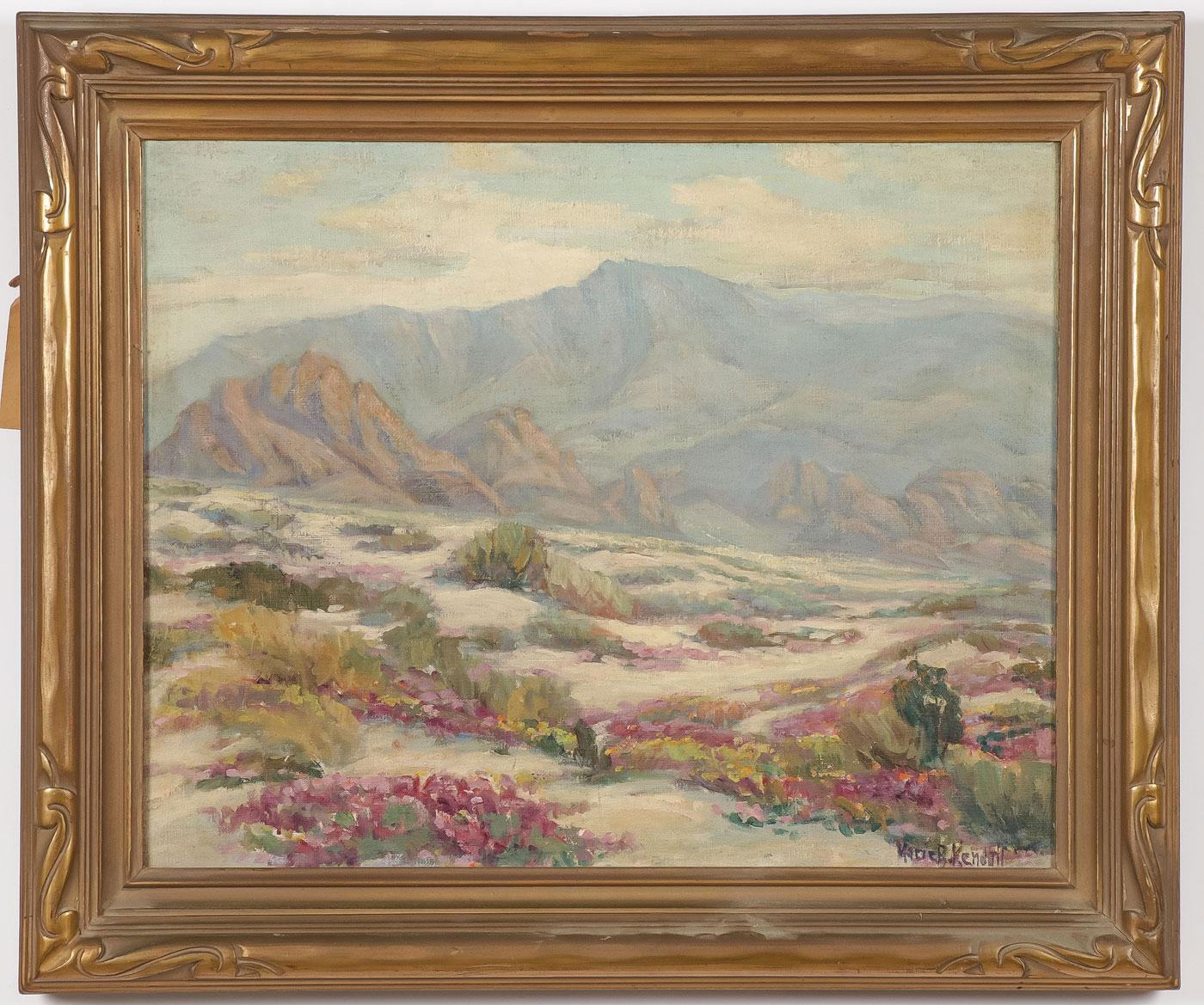

Marie Boening Kendall (1885–1953) was an American painter.

== Life ==
Born in Mount Morris, New York, Kendall studied in New York City under William Merritt Chase. In California she attended the Los Angeles College of Fine Arts, studying with Jean Mannheim. Her paintings are in numerous California collections. A 1903 graduate of Central Michigan University, Kendall and her sister soon thereafter moved to California, settling in the town of Redlands. Around 1912 Marie married journalism teacher Dudley Kendall, with whom she moved to Laguna Beach in 1921. She traveled widely throughout North America in search of subject matter.
