= Grace Vollmer =

American painter (1884–1977)

- Born: Grace Libby; September 12, 1884; Hopkinton, Massachusetts, U.S.
- Died: November 24, 1977 (aged 93); Santa Barbara, California, U.S.
- Education: Otis College of Art and Design, Stickney Memorial Art School
- Movement: California Impressionism
- Spouse: Ralston Vollmer (m.1906–1946, death)
- Children: 2

Grace Libby Vollmer (née Libby; September 12, 1884 – November 24, 1977) was an American painter active in California and Idaho. She was a California Impressionist and painted still lifes, figures, portraits, and landscapes.

== Biography ==
Grace Libby was born on September 12, 1884, in Hopkinton, Massachusetts, and she grew up in Chelsea, Massachusetts. She was the daughter of Anne Lorraine (née Young) and Edgar Howard Libby, both parents had roots in New England going back to the 17th century. She attended Howard Seminary and later attended the Quincy Mansion School for Girls in Wollaston Park, Massachusetts.

Her family moved to Clarkston, Washington (near Lewiston, Idaho), where she later joined them. In 1906, she married Ralston Vollmer from Idaho. Both the Libby family and Vollmer family were active in the early development of the city of Lewiston, Idaho.

In the 1920s, the Vollmers moved to southern California where Grace studied at Otis College of Art and Design (formally Otis Art Institute) under E. Roscoe Shrader and Edouard Vysekal. She travelled to Munich where she was a pupil of Hans Hofmann, and continued studies with him in Berkeley in 1930. Vollmer moved to Laguna Beach where she became active in the art colony and studied with Edgar Payne and Anna Althea Hills. Additionally she took classes at Stickney Memorial Art School.

In 1939, the Vollmers moved to Santa Barbara, where she remained until her death on November 24, 1977. Her husband Ralston Vollmer died in 1946, and her two children died young in the 1940s.

She was a member of the Laguna Beach Art Association and the California Art Club.
