= Carl Jonnevold =

Norwegian-born American painter (1856–1955)

Carl Henrik Jonnevold
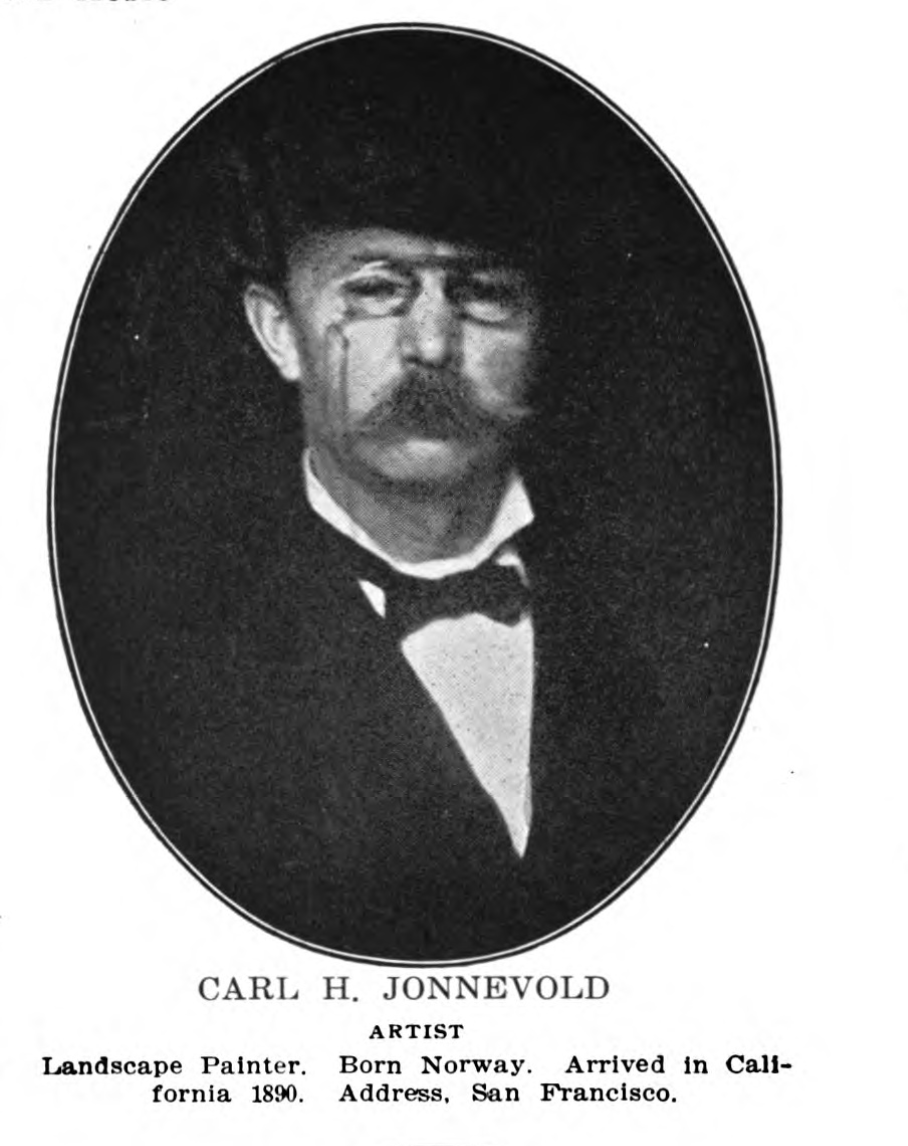
- Born: June 1, 1856; Norway
- Died: June 9, 1955 (aged 99)

Carl Henrik Jonnevold (June 1, 1856 – June 9, 1955) was a Norwegian-born American landscape artist. He is known primarily as a California impressionist and tonalist.

== Biography ==
Carl Henrik Jonnevold is thought to have briefly studied art in Paris, before emigrated to the United States in the 1880s. By 1887, he settled in California and opened a studio San Francisco, first at 1617 California Street, and later on Kearny Street. He was a self taught artist who exhibited principally in local galleries.
