= Elaine Badgley Arnoux =

American visual artist (1926–2023)

- Born: Helen Elaine Harper; April 20, 1926; Omaha, Nebraska, U.S.
- Died: July 15, 2023 (aged 97); San Francisco, California, U.S.
- Other names: Elaine Stranahan, Elaine Badgley, Elaine Kozloff
- Education: Chouinard Art Institute
- Occupation: Visual artist
- Known for: Portraiture, drawings, sculpture
- Spouse(s): Robert Stranahan (m. 1946–c. 1951; divorced), John Badgley (m. c. 1952–c. 1974; divorced), Gilles Arnoux (m. 1975–1989; divorced), Harold Kozloff (m. 2001–2014; his death)
- Children: 3
- Website: ebaart.com

Elaine Badgley Arnoux (née Helen Elaine Harper; April 20, 1926 – July 15, 2023), was an American visual artist. She was known for her portraits, drawings, sculptures, and a series of portraits of the mayors of San Francisco. Badgley Arnoux operated the Elaine Badgley Arnoux School of Art (EBA School of Art) in San Francisco, She also went by the names Elaine Stranahan, Elaine Badgley, Elaine Arnoux, and Elaine Kozloff.

== Biography ==
Helen Elaine Harper was born on April 20, 1926, in Omaha, Nebraska. Her parents were Harriet and Charles Harper, and her family life was unstable due to abuse by her father. When she was a child, her father was arrested for impregnating a minor, and as a result she was sent to live with her grandparents. After her father was released from prison the family moved to Whittier, California. When she was a teenager she became a portrait painter, and received a two year scholarship to Chouinard Art Institute.

In 1957, her first solo show was held at the Robert Day Gallery in Richmond, California. In 1965 she and her family moved from San Luis Obispo and settled in San Francisco, California. In 1975, she married Gilles Arnoux and they moved to his hometown of Biot, Alpes-Maritimes, France for three years. When she returned to San Francisco, she opened the Elaine Badgley Arnoux School of Art for a few years.

Her work can be found in public collections, including the San Luis Obispo Museum of Art, and the Smith College Museum of Art. She was the subject of the documentary film, Shadow and Light: The life and Art of Elaine Badgley Arnoux (2011) by director William Farley.

Badgley Arnoux died on July 15, 2023, in her home in San Francisco.
