= Grace Clements (artist) =

American painter, mosaicist, and art critic

- Born: June 8, 1905; Oakland, California, U.S.
- Died: January 10, 1969; Los Angeles, California, U.S.
- Spouse(s): Thayer Waldo (married 1938); Robert DeLuce (spouse at time of death)

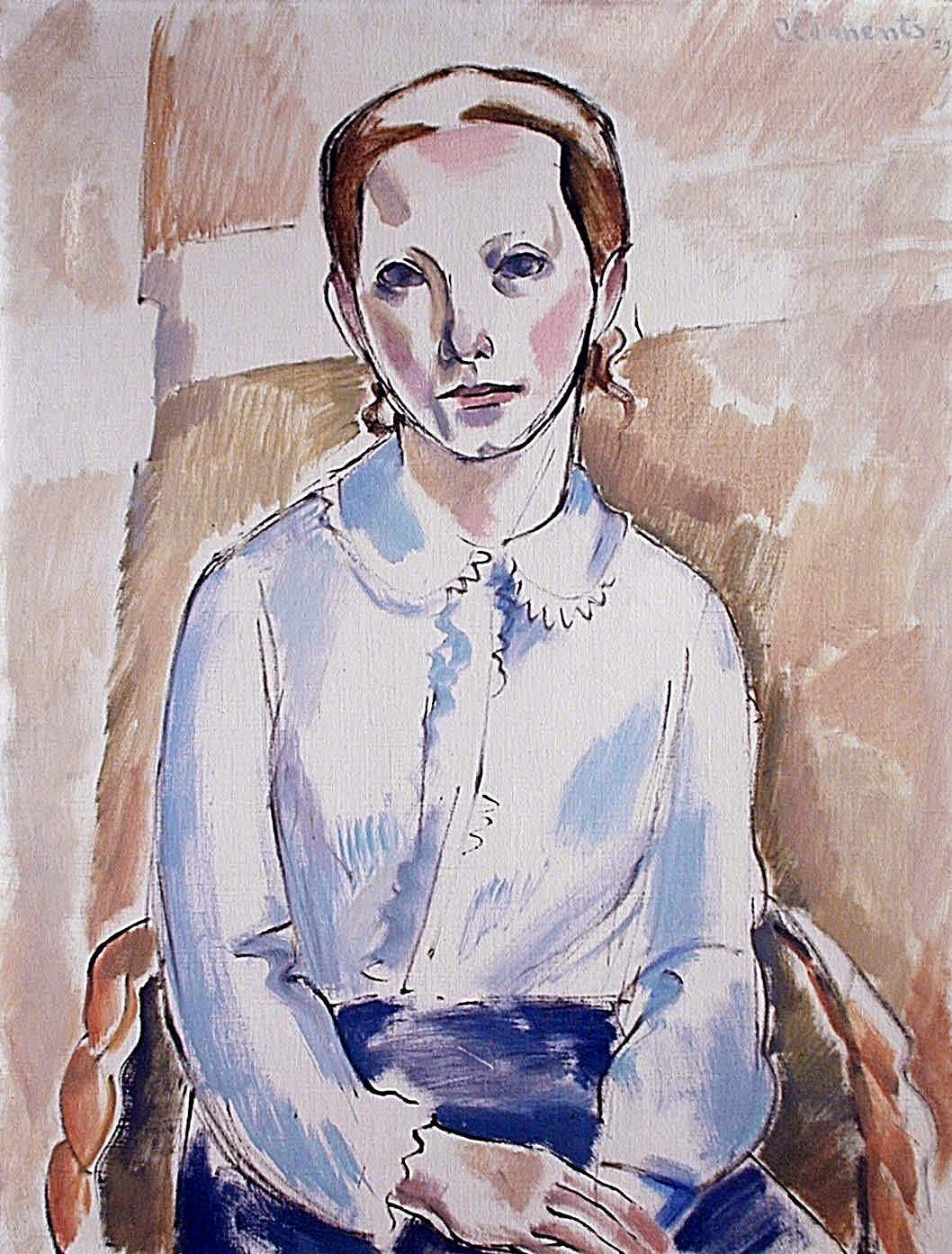
Portrait of a Young Girl, 1929, by Grace Clements

Grace Richardson Clements (1905–1969) was an American painter, mosaicist, and art critic. She was active as an artist in the 1920s, 1930s and early 1940s.

== Early life and education ==
Clements was born in Oakland, California on June 8, 1905. She married Traverse Clements in 1923. They divorced in 1928. She studied art under Kenneth Hayes Miller and Boardman Robinson in New York City from 1925 to 1930. She moved to Los Angeles in 1930, settling in the neighborhood of Edendale.She taught art at the Chouinard Art Institute and Pasadena's Stickney Memorial Art School.

== Career ==
She had a 1931 solo show at the Los Angeles County Museum of Art in which 21 of her paintings were presented. In 1935, she became involved with a group of artists in Los Angeles known as the Post-Surrealists; other artists in the group included Lorser Feitelson and Helen Lundeberg. With this group, she presented her artwork in a "landmark" exhibition at the San Francisco Museum of Art in December 1935, and then at the Brooklyn Museum the next summer. In addition, she was the first of the group to lay out its theoretical underpinnings, which she did in the March 1936 article "New Content—New Form" in the journal Art Front, published by the American Artists' Congress. She was passionate about social justice and "adopted the theme of social engagement within an essentially Modernist vocabulary". She worked for the Works Progress Administration. Her works include the 1942 murals and ceramic tiles in the Long Beach Airport, collectively titled Communication (Aviation and Navigation); The History of Aviation, a Federal Art Project fresco painted with Jean Goodwin Ames at Charles A. Lindbergh Middle School in Long Beach; a mosaic at the Long Beach Municipal Auditorium (then the largest cut-tile mosaic in the United States); and Reconsideration of Time and Space.

Clements married journalist Thayer Waldo in 1938, and the couple moved to the Bay Area in the late 1940s. In the 1940s, Clements stopped working as a painter and worked instead as an art critic. She contributed to Arts and Architecture and Art Front magazines, and also did radio commentary including a weekly program on the Bay Area radio station KPFA. Later in her life, Clements married astrologer Robert DeLuce and became involved in astrology herself.

Clements died on January 10, 1969, in Los Angeles, California. Her works are held in public collections by Mills College, the Oakland Museum, and the Wolfsonian-FIU museum.

== Exhibitions ==
- Jake Zeitlin's Book Shop, Los Angeles, California (solo, 1930)
- An Exhibition of Modern Paintings by Grace Clements, Los Angeles Museum of History, Science, and Art (predecessor to Los Angeles County Museum of Art) (solo, 1931)
- Oakland Art Gallery (group, 1932)
- Post-Surrealists, San Francisco Museum of Art (later the San Francisco Museum of Modern Art) and Brooklyn Museum (group, 1935/1936)
- New York World's Fair (group, 1939)
- Southern California Art Project, Los Angeles Museum of History, Science, and Art (group, 1939)
- Between Two Wars, Whitney Museum of American Art (group, 1942)
- Southern California Art Project, Los Angeles Museum of History, Science, and Art (group, 1944)
