= San Luis Obispo Museum of Art =

Art museum in San Luis Obispo, California

The San Luis Obispo Museum of Art
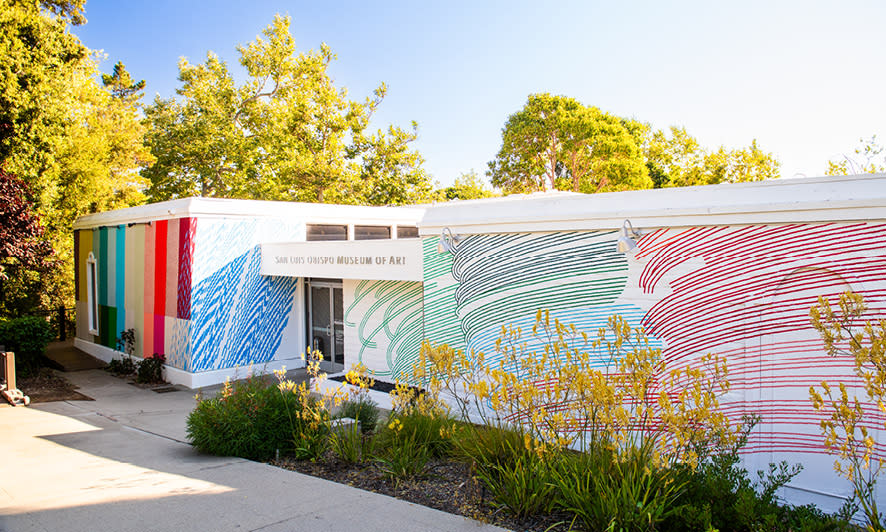
- The San Luis Obispo Museum of Art exterior showing the mural Meter & Time by MOMO

- Location in California
- Established: 1952
- Location: 1010 Broad Street, San Luis Obispo, CA 93401
- Coordinates: 35.2806°N 120.6641°W
- Website: sloma.org

The San Luis Obispo Museum of Art (SLOMA) is an art museum in San Luis Obispo, California. The building is west of the Mission San Luis Obispo de Tolosa.

== History ==
The San Luis Obispo Museum of Art was established in 1952 as the San Luis Obispo Art Association. This was co-founded by Elaine Badgley Arnoux, who was also its first president.

In 1967, the association moved to its current site within the Mission Plaza block. The following year, it added the Gray Wing gallery. A second expansion in 1984 introduced the Nybak Wing. The institution underwent two name changes: in 1997, to the San Luis Obispo Arts Center, and in 2011, to its current name, the San Luis Obispo Museum of Art.

In November 2025, the museum announced that it was expanding, and that the new museum would be on Higuera Street in Downtown San Luis Obispo. The project is estimated to cost $20 million, and will tentatively open in 2027. The current location on Broad Street is intended to be repurposed into an educational space.

== Programs and events ==
The San Luis Obispo Museum of Art offers tours, educational programs, and community events, including artist talks and hands-on activities. It also participates in countywide arts initiatives.

== Permanent collection ==
Established in 1998, the museum's permanent collection includes works by Elaine Badgley Arnoux, Phil Dike, Emil Kosa Jr., George Papashvily, Henry Fukuhara, Beth Van Hoesen, Doron Gazit, Mildred Bryant Brooks, and Ralph Bacerra.

== Exhibitions ==
Two rotating galleries exhibit regional, national, and international artists. Notable past exhibitions have shown artists including Anila Quayyum Agha, Neil Mendoza, Alyssa Monks, Camille Hoffman, Faig Ahmed, and Mark di Suvero.

== Public art ==
The San Luis Obispo Museum of Art organizes public art projects, including rotating murals, large-scale installations, and collaborations with local organizations.

=== Rotating mural program ===
The museum commissions artists to paint the museum’s exterior walls with temporary murals annually. Notable projects include Meter & Time by MOMO, SLO(W) Rainbow by Leah Rosenberg, Calafia was Here by Erin LeAnne Mitchell, and Pacificaribbean by Juan Alberto Negroni.

=== Lawn installations ===
The museum's outdoor lawn hosts annually rotating installations, displaying large-scale sculptural works. These have included Tidewalker by April Banks, David by Adam Parker Smith, and Mamma Mobius by Mark di Suvero.

=== City collaborations ===
Through an ongoing partnership with the City of San Luis Obispo, the San Luis Obispo Museum of Art has facilitated several public art projects. These have included Along the Way by Rachel B. Hayes, The Greys in Between by Anila Quayyum Agha, and Seven Sisters (Celestial Subduction) by Maria Molteni which was painted on the back of the Fremont Theatre in San Luis Obispo.
