= Post-surrealism =

Post-surrealism is a movement that arose in Southern California in 1934 when Helen Lundeberg and Lorser Feitelson wrote a manifesto explaining their desire to use art to convey the relationship between the perceptual and the conceptual.

The term "Post-surrealism" is sometimes used to refer to art movements related to or influenced by Surrealism, which occurred after the period of "historical surrealism" of the 1920s and 30s.

== History ==
Both Lundeberg and Feitelson participated in a showing of art for the Los Angeles Art Association on Wilshire Boulevard in 1954. Along with Stephen Longstreet and Elise Cavanna, the artists whose paintings were presented were known collectively as Functionists West. Feitelson and Cavanna showed only non-objective works. Both artists employed flat-colored and near geometrical shapes.

Post-Surrealism was an American spin on the European-born art movement of the 20th Century. Beginning in the 1930s, artists searched for a style that would differentiate themselves from the dreamlike surrealism of Europe and more sub-conscious, earlier movements of Romanticism and Modernism. This new form of "Americana Dream" art began in Los Angeles, California. The cities' fanciful, other-worldly architecture and extravagant city-scape provided ample inspiration for burgeoning artists. Other cities such as San Francisco, New York, and Dallas became hotbeds for these creators.

While exhibiting in California in 1934, Lorser Feitelson and Helen Lundberg displayed their work under the name post-surrealism. For the first time, artists were able to separate themselves through their own name, and even formed a Surrealism group which boasted such great artists as Philip Guston, Reuben Kadish, Knud Merrild, and Grace Clements.

As a social movement as well as art, the works being created at this time reflected the prevalent issues throughout the country. Undoubtedly, the war was a major factor in the surrealism movement. Although the works which focused on these events were surrealist, they are now classified as Social-surrealism. Dalí influenced many social surrealists, including O. Louis Guglielmi, James Guy, Walter Quirt and David Smith, whose techniques can be seen in all of the aforementioned artists' works.
