= Joseph Raphael =

American painter

- Born: June 2, 1869; Jackson, California, U.S.
- Died: December 11, 1950 (aged 81); San Francisco, California, U.S.
- Known for: Painting

Joseph Raphael (1869–1950) was an American Impressionist painter who spent most of his career as an expatriate but maintained close ties with the artistic community of San Francisco, California.

== Biography ==
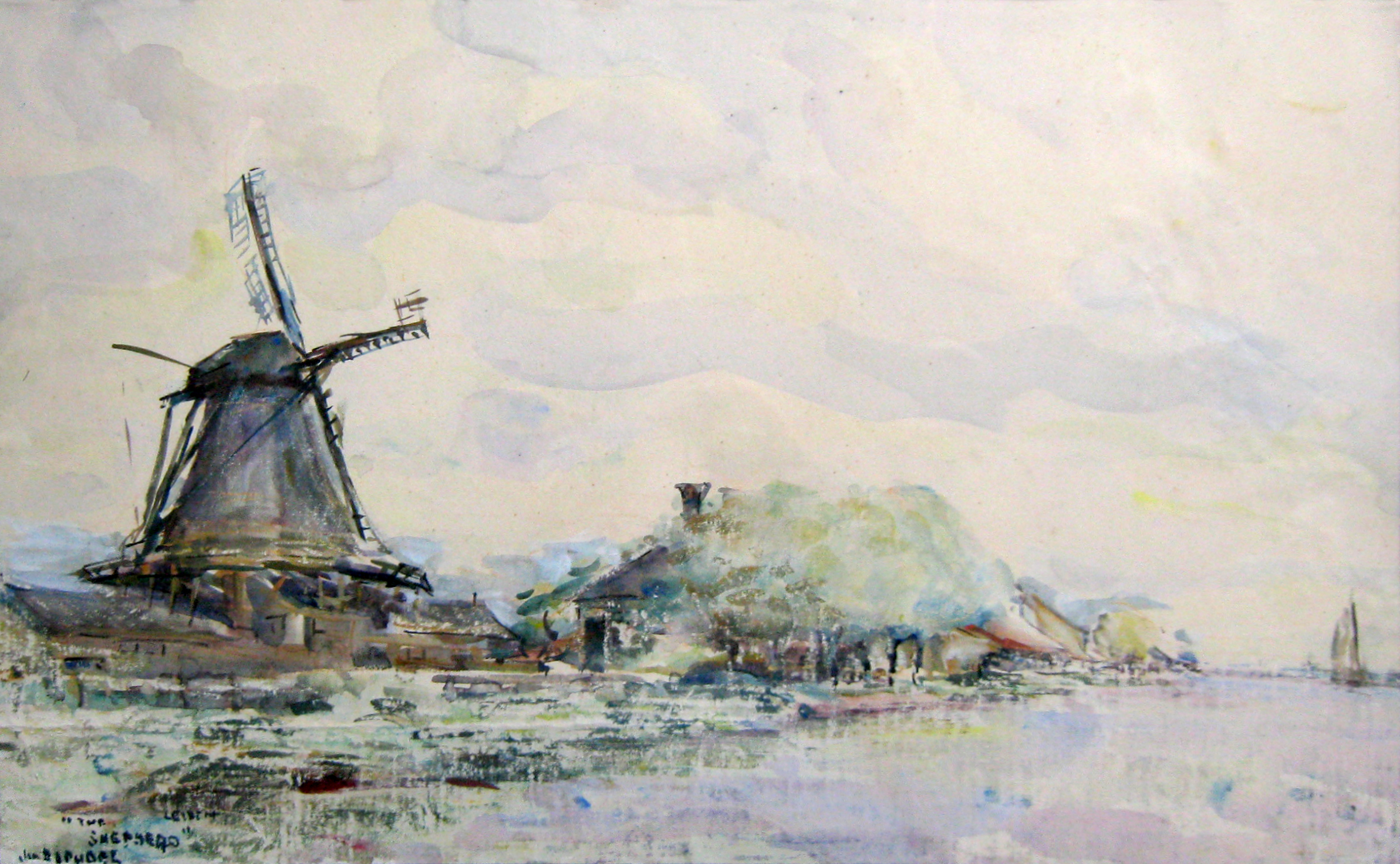
Joseph Raphaël, "The Shepherd", 1934

Born in the town of Jackson, California on June 2, 1869, Raphael studied with Arthur F. Mathews at the California School of Design. In 1902 he entered the École nationale supérieure des Beaux-Arts in Paris, but then moved to the Académie Julian and studied under Jean-Paul Laurens. He spent parts of the next several years in the Netherlands, producing paintings in a dark style derived from the Dutch Masters. In 1906 his large oil La Fete du Bourgmestre received an honorable mention at the Paris Salon; it was subsequently purchased by a group of friends in San Francisco and given to the San Francisco Art Association. In 1910 he had a solo exhibition at the San Francisco Institute of Art; beginning in 1913 he had annual exhibitions at Helgesen Galleries, San Francisco. He would ship artworks to his San Francisco friend and patron Albert M. Bender, who bought some and encouraged friends to buy others. Raphael also participated in the annual group shows of the San Francisco Art Association.

Before long he adopted a style borrowed from French Impressionism, eventually using broader, freer, more Post-Impressionist brushstrokes. By 1912 he was married and living in Uccle, Belgium, a suburb of Brussels. He produced many paintings of the countryside near his home. As Raphael's international reputation grew, his family grew as well, to include four daughters and a son. His family frequently appeared in his figurative works. By the early 1930s Raphael and his family were living in a suburb of Leiden, Holland, and he painted often in nearby Bruges. In 1939, with World War II approaching, he returned to San Francisco, where he lived and maintained a studio on Sutter Street until his death on December 11, 1950.

Known primarily as a painter, Raphael was also a skilled printmaker, creating numerous etchings and color woodcuts of European and San Francisco Bay Area scenes.

== Museum collections ==
- Fine Arts Museums of San Francisco
- Oakland Museum of California
- San Francisco Museum of Modern Art
- Monterey Museum of Art
- Krannert Art Museum, University of Illinois
- Crocker Art Museum

== Awards ==
- Honorable Mention, Paris Salon, 1906
- Silver Medal, Panama-Pacific International Exposition, San Francisco, 1915
- Gold Medal, Panama–California Exposition, San Diego, 1915

== Sources ==
- Plein Air Painters of the North, by Ruth Lily Westphal, 1996
- Artists in California, 1786-1940, by Edan Milton Hughes, 2002
- Montgomery Gallery, San Francisco

== Additional references ==
- Joseph Raphael (1869-1950): An Artistic Journey (Spanierman Gallery, 2003) ISBN 0945936613
- California Art Research (1937), vol. 5, pp. 32–42
