= Jean Stern (art historian) =

Moroccan-born American art historian

- Born: March 28, 1946 (age 80); Casablanca, Morocco
- Occupations: Executive Director, The Irvine Museum (1992 - Present)

Jean Stern (born March 28, 1946), Director Emeritus of The Irvine Museum is an art historian and retired museum director who specializes in paintings of the California Impressionist period (1890-1930).

== Early life ==
Jean Stern was born in Casablanca, Morocco in 1946, and came to the United States in 1955. He began working in the art business from a young age, growing up as the second son of Frederic Stern, an art dealer who specialized in 19th century French painting. Stern's older brother, Louis Stern, is President of Louis Stern Fine Arts in West Hollywood, specializing in Impressionist, Post-Impressionist and Modern Art. In 2007, Louis Stern was presented with France's highest decoration, the Chevalier de la Légion d'Honneur in 2007. His younger brother, George Stern, is President of George Stern Fine Arts located in Palm Desert, CA and specializes in historic and contemporary California Impressionist paintings.

== Career and professional development ==
Stern earned a master's degree in Art History from San Diego State University in 1972 and pursued post-graduate studies in American paintings at the University of California, Los Angeles, under E. Maurice Bloch. He briefly taught art history at San Diego Mesa College before being hired by Petersen Galleries in Beverly Hills. Stern worked at Petersen Galleries on Rodeo Drive in Beverly Hills from 1978 to 1991. As newly appointed executive director, he took the gallery into the nascent field of late 19th-early 20th century California paintings, becoming the first art gallery in the U.S. to develop a national clientele for this style. He is credited with coining the term "California Impressionism" first used in his introductory essay to Plein Air Painters of California: The Southland, published in 1982 by Ruth Lilly Westphal. This was the first book on Southern California painting to gain national distribution.

While at Petersen Galleries, Stern mounted retrospective exhibitions for at-the-time relatively unknown or forgotten masters such as Franz A. Bischoff (1980), Sam Hyde Harris (1980), Alson S. Clark (1983), Christian von Schneidau (1986) and Elsie Palmer Payne (1990), wife of Edgar A. Payne. The exhibitions were accompanied by fully illustrated catalogues with essays by pioneers in the field such as Ruth Westphal, Janet Blake, and Evelyn Payne Hatcher, daughter of Edgar and Elsie Payne. In 1981, Stern curated an exhibition entitled Western Masters, displaying works by Frederic Remington, Charles M. Russell, William R. Leigh, and Henry Farny.

In the 1980s, Stern served as advisor to the Morton H. Fleisher-F.F.C.A. collection in Scottsdale and was consultant on the founding of the Fleischer Museum which opened in 1990. It was the first museum in the U.S. dedicated to California Impressionist art.

Petersen Galleries was owned by publisher and Petersen Automotive Museum founders Robert E. Petersen and Margie Petersen. Stern served as Curator from 1978 to late 1979 and as Executive Director until Robert Petersen sold his company and closed the gallery in 1991.

== Irvine Museum ==
When Petersen Galleries closed in 1991, Stern opened his own gallery, Jean Stern Fine Paintings, in Encino, California. There, he met Joan Irvine Smith, heiress to the Irvine Ranch fortune. Smith had recently started collecting California Impressionist paintings and a few months later she hired him to establish, develop and direct The Irvine Museum, in Irvine, California, in 1992.

The Irvine Museum opened in January, 1993 and was first located on the twelfth floor of a seventeen-story office building. Drawing from Smith's extensive collection of California Impressionist paintings, as well as from a number of specialist collectors, Stern mounted three on-site exhibitions per year. Additionally, he initiated an ongoing series of traveling exhibitions, visiting over seventy venues throughout the U.S., including New York, Chicago, Charleston, Memphis, Tulsa, Scottsdale, Oakland, Sacramento, and many others. Each traveling exhibition was accompanied by a fully illustrated book.

In 2002, the Irvine Museum organized "Masters of Light," the first and to date only exhibition of California Impressionism to tour Europe, with venues in Paris, Krakow and Madrid.

In December 2016, The Irvine Museum Collection was gifted to University of California, Irvine (UCI). It is now known as The Irvine Museum Collection at the University of California, Irvine. The museum is the initial component of a planned university museum that will specialize in all periods of California art.

== Involvement and awards ==
Jean Stern serves on the Board of Directors of the California Art Club, the Laguna Plein Air Painters Association and is on the advisory board of the California Heritage Museum.

In 2017, Jean Stern received the designation of Chevalier de l'Ordre des Arts et des Lettres, awarded by the French Ministry of Culture. He received the award in recognition of his lifelong work in the visual arts. He has also received Lifetime Achievement Awards from the Laguna Plein Air Painters Association, the Plein Air Painters of America, and from Plein-Air Magazine at the Third Annual Plein Air Convention in 2014. In 2011, he and his wife Linda Weingarten Stern were honored with the Samuel Gendel Community Service Award, presented by the American Jewish Committee of Orange County.
