= Channel Pickering Townsley =

American painter, art administrator, and educator

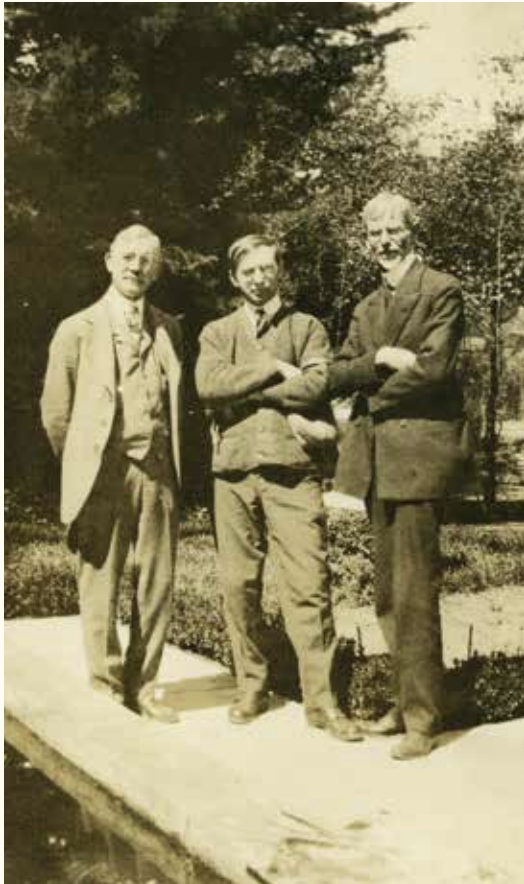
Left to Right: Channel Pickering Townsley, Richard E. Miller, and Benjamin C. Brown in 1917 at Fenyes Estate

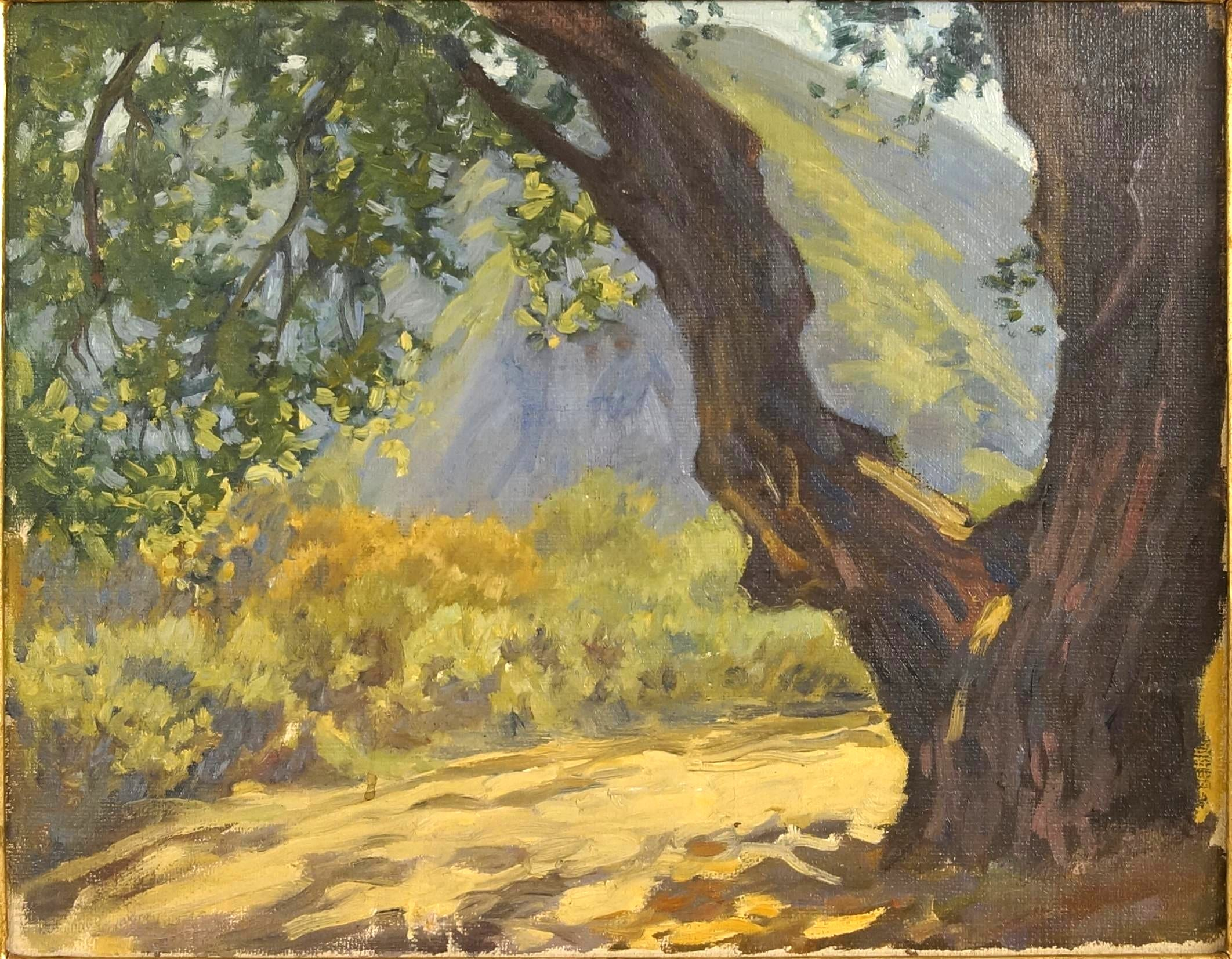
California Landscape

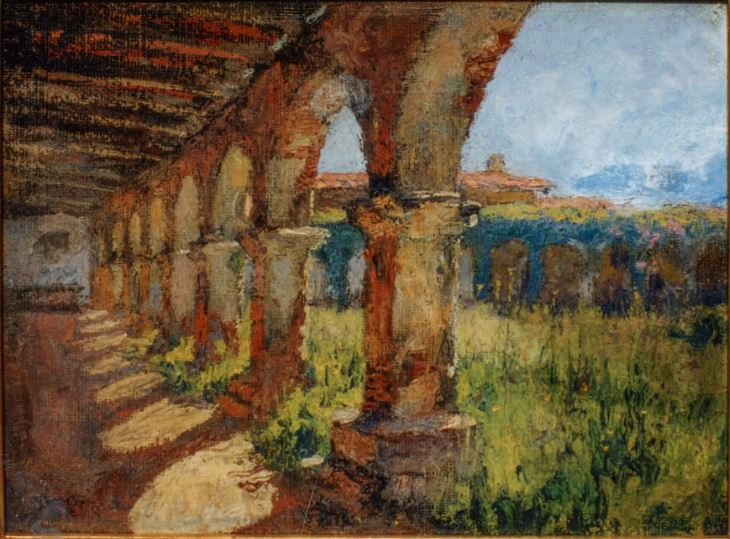
The Cloisters (Capistrano?)

Channel "Chan" Pickering Townsley or C.P. Townsley (1867–1921) was an American painter, art administrator, and educator. The subject and genre of his California Impressionist paintings were landscapes, portraits and still lives. He served as a director of Otis Art Institute (1914–1921) and Stickney Memorial Art School (c.1912–1918).

== Early life and education ==
Townsley was born on January 20, 1867, in Sedalia, Missouri. His family moved in 1875 to Great Bend, Kansas.

He attended Washburn College in Topeka, Kansas. Townsley moved to Paris to continue his study at Académie Delécluse and Académie Julian. Townsley returned to the United States, and he studied with William Merritt Chase in New York City. He married Lois Kilmer and together they had two daughters.

== Career ==
Townsley illustrated Ellen P. Allerton's Walls Of Corn and Other Poems, which was published by the journalist Eva Ryan in 1894.

While living in New York he became a member of the Salmagundi Club. Townsley managed Chase's Shinnecock Hills Summer School of Art on Long Island and organized the Chase European Summer art classes starting in 1902 to the Netherlands. From 1905 until 1910, he served as the director and an instructor at the London School of Art, working alongside Frank Brangwyn.

Starting in c.1912 Townsley began serving as a director of Stickney Memorial Art School and in 1914 at Otis Art Institute. During the summers he held art classes, from 1914 and 1915, he held art classes in the Monterey-area and from 1915 and 1916, he taught at the Carmel Arts and Crafts Club's Summer School of Art. In 1914, William Merritt Chase joined Townsley to teach one summer class in Carmel-by-the-Sea at the Chase School of Art, sponsored by the Club. During that time he painted a portrait of C.P. Townsley.

In 1919, he served as the President of the California Art Club (CAC) for a year.

== Death and legacy ==
He died at age 54 on December 21, 1921, in London, England, he was visiting and planning a sketching trip with Brangwyn.

Townsley's work is featured in public museum collections including Los Angeles County Museum of Art, Irvine Museum, among others.

== Exhibitions ==
- 1914 – Throop College, Pasadena, California;
- 1916 – San Francisco Art Association, San Francisco, California;
- 1916 – Exposition Park, Los Angeles, California;
- 1917 – Friday Morning Club, Los Angeles, California;
- 1917 – National Academy of Design, New York City, New York;
- 1918 – Los Angeles County Museum of Art, Los Angeles, California;
- 1923 – Stendahl Gallery, Los Angeles, California.
