= Nora Eccles Harrison Museum of Art =

Coordinates: 41°44′35″N 111°48′22″W

- Established: 1982
- Location: Logan, Utah
- Type: Art museum
- Website: artmuseum.usu.edu

Nora Eccles Harrison Museum of Art

The Nora Eccles Harrison Museum of Art (NEHMA) is an accredited academic art museum focused on modern and contemporary art, located at Utah State University in Logan, Utah. NEHMA was founded in 1982 with the ceramic collection of philanthropist and namesake Nora Eccles Harrison. The museum has since expanded to include over 5,500 objects focused on modernist and contemporary works created in the western region of the United States. The core of the collection explores certain key art historical movements including Beat, post-surrealism, Santa Fe Transcendentalism, and Bay Area Abstract Expressionism. The museum also collects and exhibits contemporary works that function as glimpses of the thriving art scenes found in many cities in the Western United States.

== History ==
Nora Eccles Harrison and her second husband, Richard Harrison, founded the museum with a gift to build a museum building and more than four hundred ceramic objects. The building was designed by architect Edward Larrabee Barnes and opened in 1982. In the fall of 2013 the courtyard outside the museum's entrance began renovations. NEHMA's collection continues to grow with ceramics in the vessel tradition, as well as works on paper, painting, sculpture and multimedia works, enabled largely through the support of the Marie Eccles Caine Foundation, Kathryn Caine Wanlass Foundation, Fredrick Quinney Lawson Foundation and the Lawson Foundation. In 2008 the Nora Eccles Harrison Museum of Art was selected to receive a gift from New York art collectors Herbert and Dorothy Vogel. These 50 works of art were part of a national gifts program entitled "The Dorothy and Herbert Vogel Collection: Fifty Works for Fifty States.” This program has distributed 2,500 works of art from the Vogel's personal collection of over 4,000 pieces of modern and contemporary art, with 50 works going to one selected art institution in each of the 50 states.

The museum is accredited through the American Alliance of Museums (AAM) and is also a certified Utah museum through the Utah Division of Arts and Museums. Throughout its history, NEHMA has been dedicated to collecting, preserving, and exhibiting modern and contemporary visual art. As an academic art museum and as part of the Caine College of the Arts at Utah State University, educational programs for both the students and general public remain central.

== Past exhibits ==
The Nora Eccles Harrison Museum of Art rotates exhibits regularly. Some past examples of exhibits include:

- Repainting the I: The Intermountain Intertribal Indian School Murals (January 25, 2025 - January 17, 2026) Featuring eleven murals that once adorned the walls of The Intermountain Intertribal Indian School, this exhibit showcases preserved artwork created by the Native American students who attended the school.
- Unearthed: The NEHMA Ceramics Collection & The Woman Behind It (August 30, 2022 - April 22, 2024) This exhibit highlighted the NEHMA ceramics collection and displayed approximately 292 pieces. The selection of artworks intentionally represented both recognized and under-recognized artists, women artists, influential women ceramics educators, and Native American ceramicists.
- Collecting on the Edge (September 15, 2018 - July 31, 2019) Featuring work by 172 artists, this exhibition displayed many highlights from the NEHMA permanent collection. It emphasized the focus of the museum's collection: modern and contemporary art created in the American West.
- Bang! Thwack! Plop! Comics: an Influence on Contemporary Art (June 14, 2011 – July 28, 2012) This exhibition explored the intersection of comics and art with specific attention to themes and stylistic forms that have crossed over from the genre of comics into the world of visual art.
- Abstracting the Land: Southwest Transcendentalism (November 2007 – May 3, 2008) This exhibition of artwork from the permanent collection focused on painters working in 1930s New Mexico known as the Transcendental Painting Group. The group established themselves as artists who strove to define their art beyond the traditions of landscape, still life, and figurative imagery.
