= Frank Tolles Chamberlin =

American artist (1873–1961)

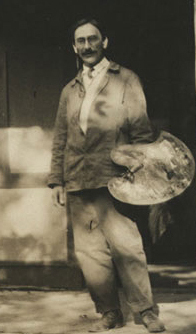
- Born: March 10, 1873; San Francisco, California, US
- Died: July 24, 1961 (aged 88); Pasadena, California, US
- Education: Art Students League
- Known for: painting
- Awards: 1911 Rome Prize

Frank Tolles Chamberlin (March 10, 1873 – July 24, 1961) was an American painter, muralist, sculptor, and art teacher.

He studied at the Art Students League with George DeForest Brush and George Bridgman. He taught for four years at the Beaux-Arts Institute of Design, and spent summers at MacDowell.

He taught at the Otis Institute, in 1921, as a founding faculty member at the Chouinard Art Institute, and at the University of Southern California School of Architecture. His work was part of the sculpture event in the art competition at the 1932 Summer Olympics.

In 1918, he married Katharine Beecher Stetson, the only daughter of artist Charles Walter Stetson and writer/feminist Charlotte Perkins Gilman.

== Exhibitions ==
- 1913 New York Architectural League
- 1914 Boston Architectural Club, Massachusetts
- 1916 The MacDowell Club, New York
- 1921 Painters & Sculptors of Los Angeles
- 1922 Sculptors Guild of Southern California
- 1929, 1945 California Palace of the Legion of Honor
- 1934 Public Works of Art Project
- 1935 Academy of Western Painters, Los Angeles
- 1939 GGIE
- 1940 California Watercolor Society
- 1942 University of Redlands, California
- 1947 Jepson Art Institute
- 1955 Pasadena Art Museum retrospective

== Awards ==
- 1911 Rome Prize
- 1935 2nd prize, Academy of Western Painters (LA)
- 1936 James Ackley McBride Award, Pasadena Society of Artists
- 1940 Logan Medal of the Arts, Los Angeles Branch of Society for Sanity in Art
