= Reuben Kadish =

American artist and teacher (1913–1992)

- Born: January 29, 1913; Chicago, Illinois
- Died: September 20, 1992 (aged 79); New York, New York
- Spouse: Barbara Weeks Kadish
- Website: reubenkadish.org

Reuben Kadish (January 29, 1913 – September 20, 1992) was an American artist who worked as a sculptor, draughtsman, muralist, painter, and printmaker. In his later career he taught art history and sculpture in New York City, most notably at Cooper Union.

== Biography ==
=== Early life ===
Kadish was born in Chicago on January 29, 1913, to immigrant parents from Kovno (now Kaunas) in the Russian Empire (now Lithuania). He was the eldest of three sons. The family moved to Los Angeles, California, in 1920.

His father, Samuel Kadish, was a painting contractor by trade and also held strong political convictions: as a young man in pre-revolutionary Russia he had been a member of the General Jewish Labour Bund in Kovno. The Yiddish-speaking household was rich in books and periodicals, and Samuel, though his own formal schooling had ended at age ten, was a trained decorative painter skilled in techniques such as faux bois and marbling. Reuben inherited both his father's artistic inclinations and his political activism: as a teenager he led a protest against the United States Marine presence in Nicaragua, an act that resulted in his suspension from high school.

=== Early art career ===
By 1930, Kadish was enrolled at the Otis Art Institute in Los Angeles, where he befriended Philip Goldstein (later known as Philip Guston) and Jackson Pollock. Guston and Pollock had previously been classmates at the Manual Arts High School in Los Angeles until both were expelled for distributing satirical pamphlets. Although Pollock did not study at Otis—he moved to New York City in 1930 to study at the Art Students League of New York with Thomas Hart Benton—he visited Los Angeles frequently and remained close to both Guston and Kadish.

Guston and Kadish soon left Otis and established a shared studio nearby, where they pursued a self-directed study of Renaissance painting and the emerging Mexican muralist movement.

=== Mural period ===
The two young artists came to the attention of the Mexican muralist and political activist David Alfaro Siqueiros. Kadish volunteered as an assistant to Siqueiros during the artist's residency in Los Angeles in the early 1930s, driving him to engagements and helping with local mural projects. "I was his 'go-boy' for this, 'go-boy' for that," Kadish recalled in a 1991 interview with the Archives of American Art. "I never expected any remuneration and enjoyed the intensity and vigor of the guy. He had tremendous charisma. Along with Thomas Hart Benton, the main thing I got out of these people was that they were interested in big ideas."

Siqueiros had been awarded a major mural commission at the University of Michoacán in Morelia, Michoacán, but his attention was drawn to Europe by the Spanish Civil War. After viewing photographs of a mural Kadish and Guston had completed for a community centre in Los Angeles, Siqueiros invited the pair to execute the Morelia project in his place. Accompanied by their friend, the poet and art critic Jules Langsner, Kadish (then 21) and Guston (then 22) traveled to Mexico—their first trip outside the United States—and painted a 1,000-square-foot (93 m^{2}) mural at the University of Michoacán, housed in what had been the summer palace of Emperor Maximilian. The work, titled The Struggle Against War and Fascism, drew on both Renaissance and Surrealist influences and attracted considerable press attention in the United States. In January 2025, the mural—by then known as The Struggle Against Terrorism—was unveiled to the public at the Regional Museum of Michoacán in Morelia following a major restoration.

On returning to the United States, Kadish and Guston joined the Works Progress Administration's Federal Art Project. In 1935, they collaborated on a politically themed mural at the City of Hope, then a tuberculosis sanatorium in Duarte, California. The partnership ended shortly afterwards: Guston moved to New York City and Kadish relocated to San Francisco.

=== Great Depression and World War II ===
Working as a WPA artist in San Francisco, Kadish painted a mural titled A Dissertation on Alchemy in the Chemistry Building at San Francisco State University in 1937. In the same Archives of American Art interview he noted that his other WPA mural proposals were rejected as too unconventional: "[My designs] were too flamboyant, too revolutionary, too this, too that."

During the Second World War, Kadish worked as a civilian employee for Bethlehem Steel and the shipping industry, contributing to the construction of destroyers and submarines. He was subsequently recruited into the United States Army's Artist Unit, an elite programme funded by Congress to document the war through art. Works he produced in Burma and India—including images of bombed villages and scenes of starvation—are held in the collection of the United States Army Center of Military History in Washington, D.C.

=== Post-war years and dairy farming ===
After the war, Kadish returned to the United States with a young family. He took part-time work at Stanley Hayter's Atelier 17 in Greenwich Village, printing editions for artists including Joan Miró and André Masson. Unable to find affordable housing in the Long Island communities where friends such as Jackson Pollock had settled, he purchased a run-down 40-acre (16 ha) farm in northern New Jersey, roughly sixty miles from Manhattan, and became a dairy farmer. He later reflected: "Unfortunately I lost and separated myself from that world. It could have been in Kansas. Really, it was one of the biggest mistakes of my life."

A fire in his studio on the farm in the late 1940s destroyed the majority of his paintings. He did not paint again, but turned instead to sculpture, working with the materials and machinery of farm life.

=== Cooper Union period ===
Kadish eventually moved his family back to New York City, leasing out his farm to tenant farmers and embarking on a teaching career. He taught design at the Newark School of Fine and Industrial Art and at the Brooklyn Museum Art School before joining the faculty of Cooper Union in Manhattan in 1960, where he taught art history and sculpture until his retirement.

He worked from a small carriage house on East 9th Street, near Cooper Union, which also served as his studio. He resumed printmaking, setting up an etching press in the basement.

In 1977, Kadish led a group of students in restoring the historic Cooper Union Foundation Building, casting replacement pieces for damaged cast-iron lamps and capitals in the school's foundry, saving the institution approximately $40,000 in restoration costs.

Kadish's terra cotta and bronze sculptures were exhibited at the Elaine Poindexter Gallery and the Grace Borgenicht Gallery, as well as in two retrospective exhibitions: one at the Artists' Choice Museum in SoHo in 1985 and another at the New Jersey State Museum in 1990.

=== Personal life ===
During the 1960s, Kadish's wife, Barbara Weeks Kadish, pursued her interests in archaeology at New York University, eventually leading NYU's excavations at Aphrodisias in southwestern Turkey. In 1962, the Kadishes' eldest son, Dan Kadish, married Musa Jane Guston, daughter of Philip Guston.

Kadish was also a part-owner of the White Horse Tavern, the Greenwich Village bar where the Welsh poet Dylan Thomas died in November 1953.

== Reception ==
Kadish influenced a generation of students at Cooper Union, where his lectures ranged across Egyptian funerary sculpture, Greek mythology, and art and architecture from around the world. A portion of his slide collection is held in Cooper Union's library.

During his most prolific period in the mid-1980s, when he produced a series of expressionistic cast terra cotta and bronze portrait heads, critical and scholarly attention was directed more often to his personal reminiscences of Jackson Pollock, David Alfaro Siqueiros, Joan Miró, and other major figures than to his own work. Kadish and his late wife Barbara appear as characters in the 2000 film Pollock, starring Ed Harris.

== Legacy ==
Since his death in 1992, the Reuben Kadish Art Foundation has worked to distribute Kadish's sculpture and graphic work to museums and public collections. The Foundation draws on the artist's stated wishes: "It is my wish and direction that my works of art shall be conserved, displayed and distributed to reach the widest practicable public and shall not be sold or otherwise exploited for the private gain of any individual."

In 2018, the University of Kentucky Art Museum held two exhibitions featuring Kadish's work: "Witness" and "Frankensteinian".
