= Knud Merrild =

Danish painter

- Born: 10 May 1894; Ødum, Denmark
- Died: 31 December 1954 (aged 60); Copenhagen, Denmark
- Occupation: Painter

Knud Merrild Nielsen (10 May 1894 – 31 December 1954) was a Danish painter, sculptor and ceramicist.

== Life ==
Merrild was born in Selling, Ødum parish, in Favrskov Municipality. He worked in ceramics with the potter G. A. Eifrig at the Københavns Lervarefabrik in Valby. He was part of the circle around the avant-garde art magazine Klingen and was a friend of Vilhelm Lundstrøm. In 1921 he emigrated to the United States, where he lived in many different places, including with D. H. Lawrence in Taos, New Mexico, from 1922 to 1923, and was also a friend of the American writer Henry Miller. He later wrote about both of them. Merrild eventually settled in Los Angeles in 1927, where he remained until he returned to Denmark in 1954. He died in Copenhagen in the same year.

He submitted work for the art competitions at the 1924 Summer Olympics and the 1932 Summer Olympics.

== Written works ==
- A Poet and Two Painters: a Memoir of D. H. Lawrence, George Routledge, London, 1938
- With D. H. Lawrence in New Mexico. A Memoir of D. H. Lawrence, Routledge & Kegan Paul Ltd., London, 1964 (reissue of the 1938 book)
- All the Animals in the Zoo - about Henry Miller, Village Press 1973 (originally published in California in 1945 as part of wider collection of artists' reminiscences about Miller)
