= Lorser Feitelson =

American painter

- Lorser Feitelson, 1952, Pasadena Art Museum
- Born: I. Lorser Feitelson; 1898; Savannah, Georgia, United States
- Died: 1978 (aged 79–80); Los Angeles, California, United States
- Education: Self-taught
- Known for: Painter
- Movement: Hard Edge painting, Modernist
- Spouse(s): Nathalie Newking, Helen Lundeberg

Lorser Feitelson (1898–1978) was an artist known as one of the founding fathers of Southern California–based hard-edge painting. Born in Savannah, Georgia, Feitelson was raised in New York City, where his family relocated shortly after his birth. He rose to prominence after moving to California in 1927.

Feitelson, along with his peers Karl Benjamin, Frederick Hammersley and John McLaughlin, was featured in the landmark 1959 exhibition Four Abstract Classicists at the San Francisco Museum of Modern Art and later at the Los Angeles County Museum of Art. Curated by Los Angeles–based critic and curator Jules Langsner, the exhibition introduced the general public to the dazzling visual language created by a revolutionary group of painters. A revised version of this exhibition re-titled West Coast Hard Edge was presented in London at the Institute of Contemporary Arts and then in Belfast, Northern Ireland at Queens Court. The painting "Magical Space Forms" from 1951, reproduced below, was included in this exhibition.

Feitelson, along with his wife Helen Lundeberg and the aforementioned artists, pioneered a movement that has been celebrated by the Orange County Museum of Art's nationally toured exhibition Birth of the Cool: California Art, Design and Culture at Midcentury. Contemporary art writer and scholar Dave Hickey, in his 2004 exhibition at the Otis College of Art and Design, christened Feitelson and the other hard-edge painters as the Los Angeles School.

These artists made profound contributions to the development of American abstract painting. According to Hickey: “The New York School painters would create their idiom by internalizing abstraction, psychologizing it in the manner of Freud and Jung. The California painters take the opposite route by radically externalizing the surrealism of experience in the West. Their presumption, that surreality, visual anxiety and splendor have their roots in the physical and social world rather than the autonomous self, set art on the West Coast free from the rigor of concept and the regime of the personal that dominated American art in that moment. In the broader sense, this externalized vision granted artists the privilege of their sanity in a manic, narcissistic cultural moment and, in doing so, created the conditions out of which the language of art in Southern California art would evolve in the late twentieth century.”

== Early career ==
Lorser Feitelson, The Fountain, 1923, oil on canvas. ©The Feitelson/Lundeberg Art Foundation

Feitelson was raised in New York City and was home-schooled in drawing by his art-loving father. As a child, he pored over the family's collection of international magazines and frequently visited the Metropolitan Museum of Art.

Though his sketchbooks from those early years reveal a firm foundation in Old Master-style draftsmanship, Feitelson rethought his approach to drawing after viewing the legendary International Exhibition of Modern Art in 1913 at the 69th Regiment Armory.

The controversial work of Matisse, Duchamp and the Italian futurists had a profound effect on the young artist. Feitelson began to produce a series of formally experimental figurative drawings and paintings. By 1916, the 18-year-old set up a studio in Greenwich Village and set out to establish himself as a painter.

== Career success ==
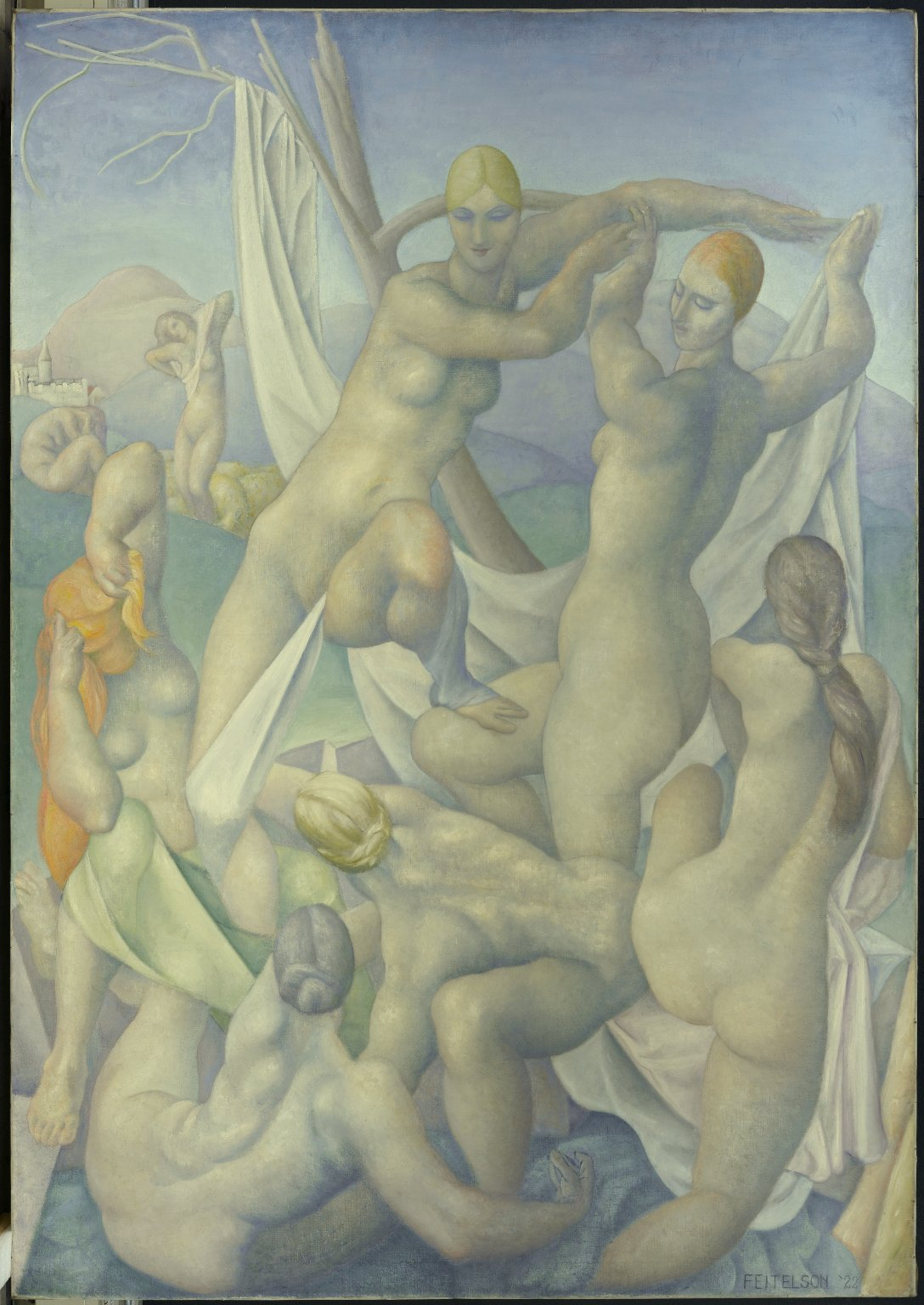
Lorser Feitelson, Diana at the Bath, 1922. Brooklyn Museum

Like all serious modernist painters of the time, Feitelson wanted to continue his study and practice in Europe. He made his first journey to Paris in 1919 and enrolled as an independent student in life drawing at the Académie Colorossi. While in Paris, he also made numerous trips to Corsica, and sketches from his time there formed the basis for later works featuring peasants as subjects. After numerous trips to Europe, and before returning home to the US permanently in 1927, Feitelson exhibited at Paris’ famous Salon d'Automne.

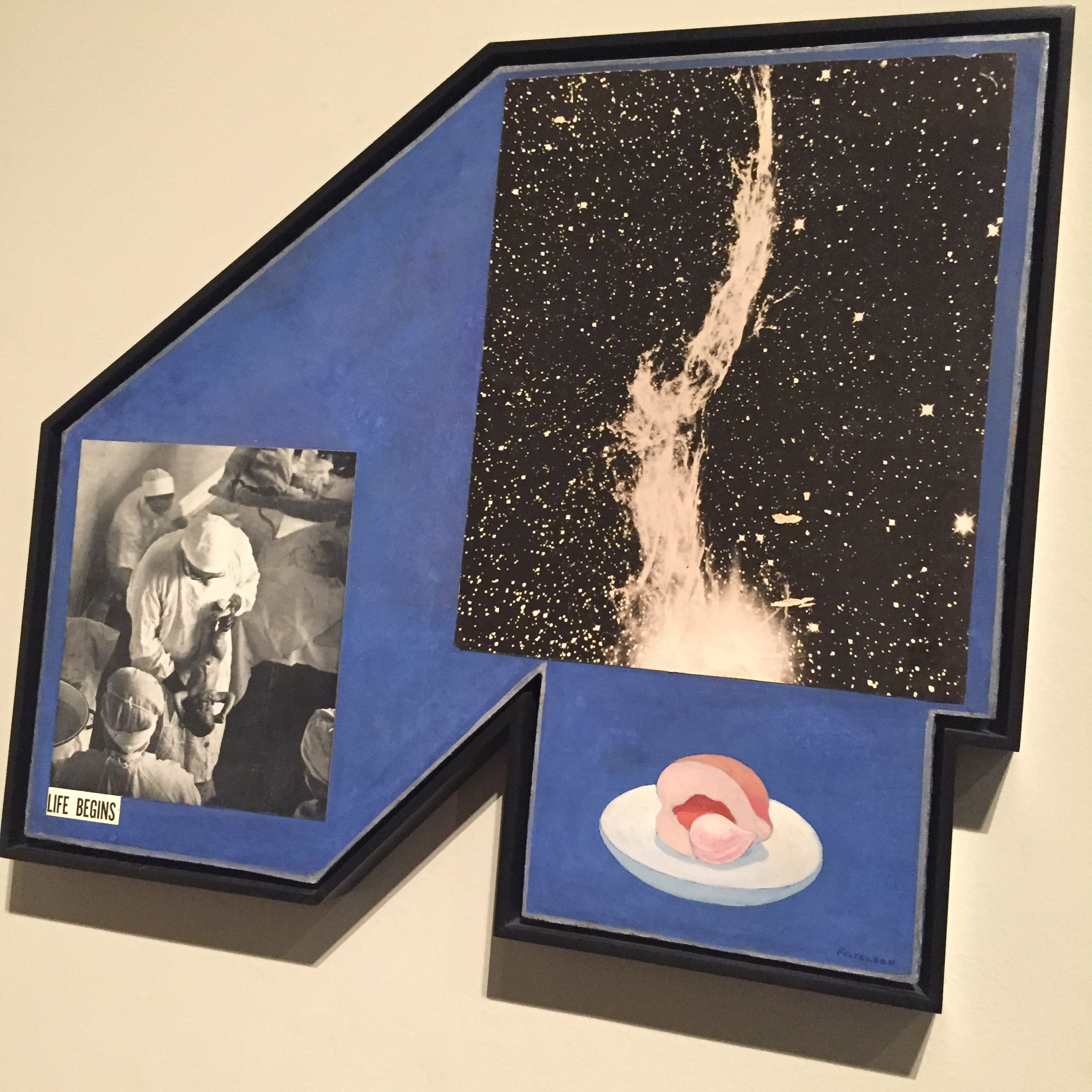
Life Begins, 1936, by Lorser Feitelson.

In November 1927, Feitelson moved to Los Angeles, and by 1930, he was working in the post-surrealist style. In the 1930s, Feitelson taught at Stickney Memorial Art School, and it was at the school that he met pupil Helen Lundeberg, his future wife and artistic collaborator. According to Lundeberg, who authored the pair's mission statement in response to the European surrealist movement, Feitelson “wanted the utilization of association, the unconscious, to make a rational use of these subjective elements. Nothing of automatism about it. The name he had for this idea at first was ‘New Classicism ‘ or ‘Subjective Classicism.’ As Jules Langsner suggested in his catalogue for the 1935 Post Surrealists and Other Moderns show at the Stanley Rose Gallery in Los Angeles, post-surrealism “affirms all that Surrealism negates.”

During this period, Feitelson was also assigned, with Stanton Macdonald-Wright, to oversee the WPA murals project on the West Coast. Though few examples of Feitelson's design are extant, the large-scale narrative requirements of the mural format are in evidence in some of his larger post-surrealist works. Flight Over New York at Twilight and Eternal Recurrence are two powerful examples of Feitelson's technical acumen as well as of his dynamic visual style.

== Move to abstraction ==
Lorser Feitelson, Magical Space Forms, 1951, oil on canvas. ©Feitelson/Lundeberg Art Foundation

By the 1940s, Feitelson had developed the use of biomorphic or "magical" forms, which saw him painting more abstractly while maintaining elements of his post-surrealist work." This evolved into a more formalized visual language in the Magical Space Forms series of the 1950s and 1960s and culminated in the elegant figurative minimalism of the "ribbon" paintings in the 1970s; “pure gesture that engages the viewer with the intimacy of an embrace.”

Gallery owner Joan Ankrum represented Feitelson and Lundeberg for three years in the 1960s, until Feitelson claimed that she was using his work "as window dressing." Ankrum described him as a "brilliant, brilliant man," yet somewhat arrogant in personality and teaching style. Feitelson taught life drawing and art history classes at what is now the Art Center College of Design, relocated to Pasadena, where he taught until his retirement in the late 1970s.

== Television ==
"Feitelson on Art" aired Weekly on the local NBC affiliate KRCA from 1956 to 1963, sponsored by the Los Angeles Art Association.

== Collections ==
Feitelson's works are included in the permanent collections of the Los Angeles County Museum of Art, the National Museum of American Art, the Smithsonian Institution, the Library of Congress and National Gallery of Art in Washington, D.C., the San Francisco Museum of Modern Art, the Whitney Museum of American Art, the Museum of Modern Art, the Brooklyn Museum of Art, the Columbus Museum of Art and the Nora Eccles Harrison Museum of Art at Utah State University, and in numerous other public and private collections. His work was most recently included in the J. Paul Getty Museum's Pacific Standard Time: Crosscurrents in L.A. Painting and Sculpture in 2011.
