= List of people from Pasadena, California =

This is a list of notable people from Pasadena, California.

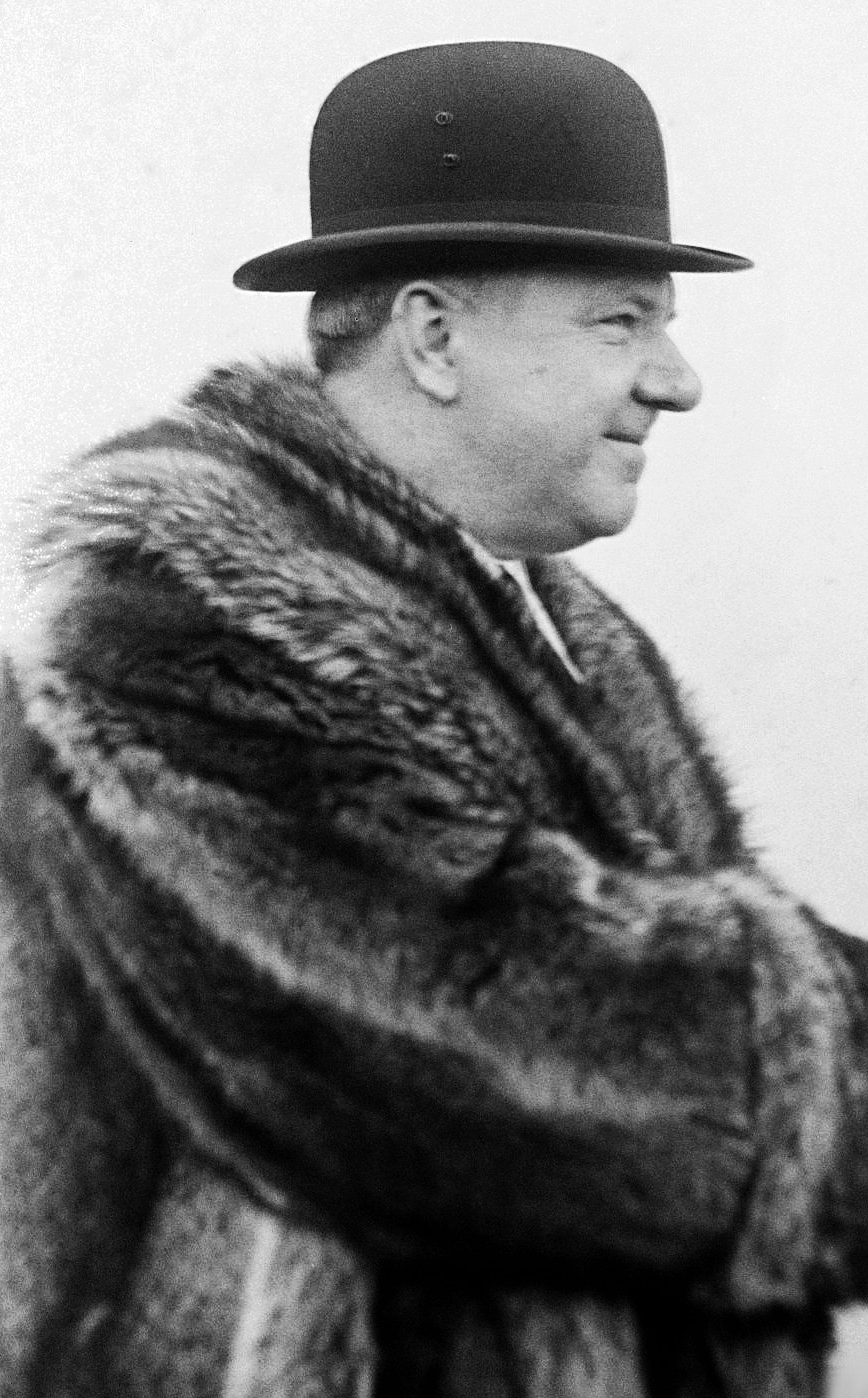
W. C. Fields

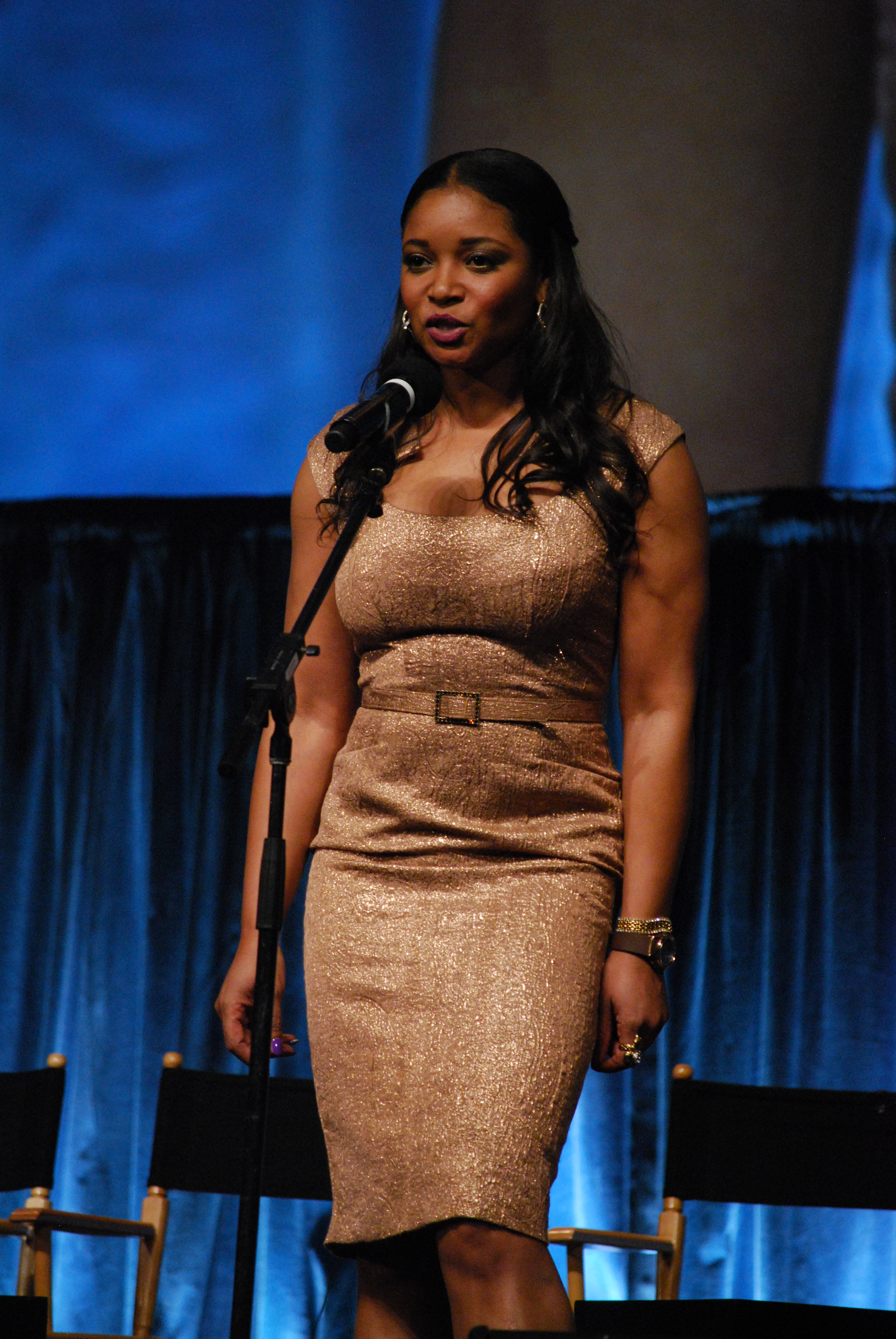
Tamala Jones

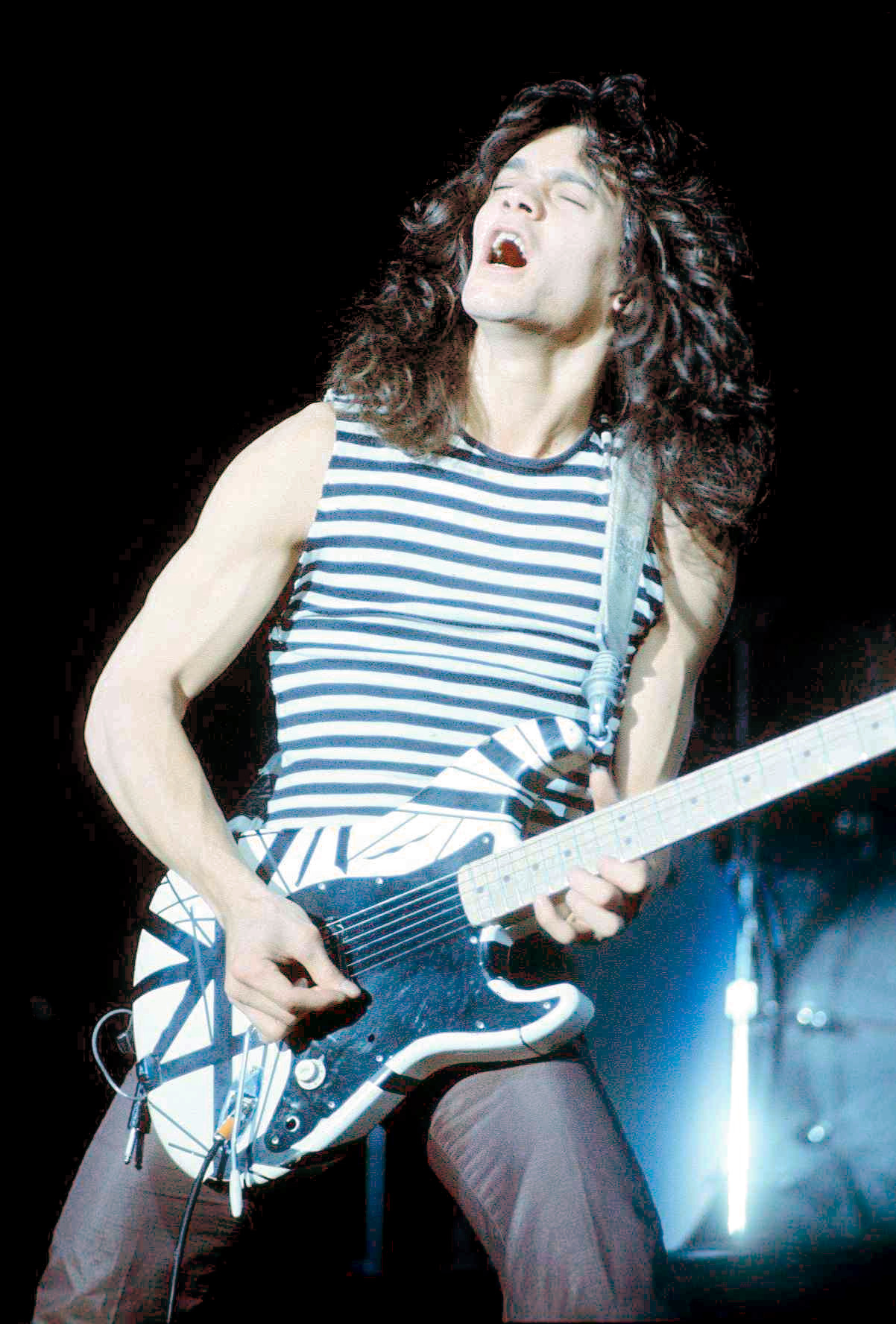
Eddie Van Halen

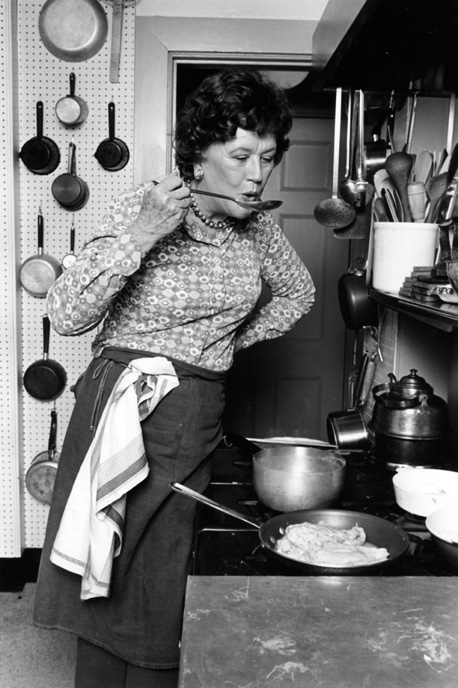
Julia Child

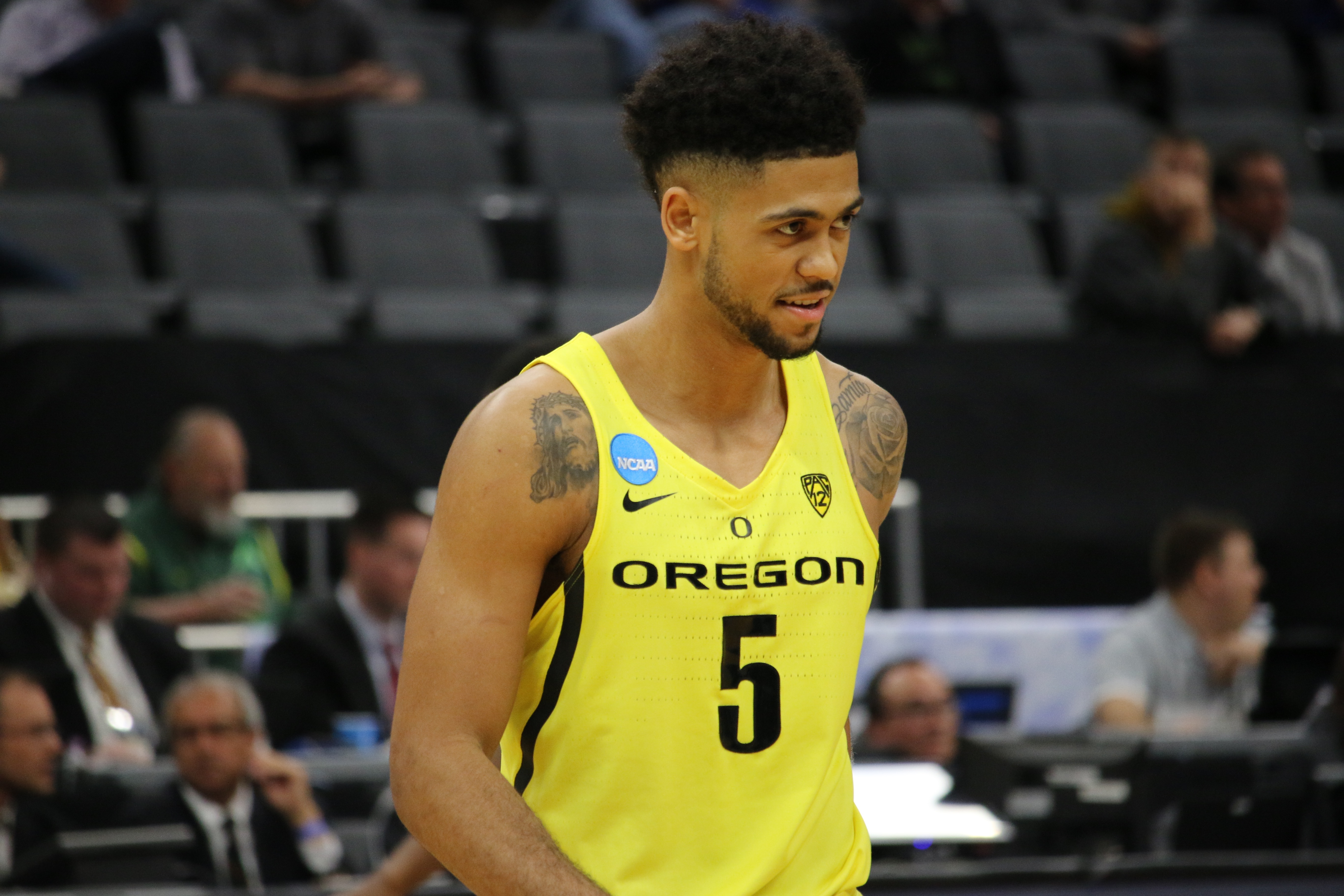
Tyler Dorsey

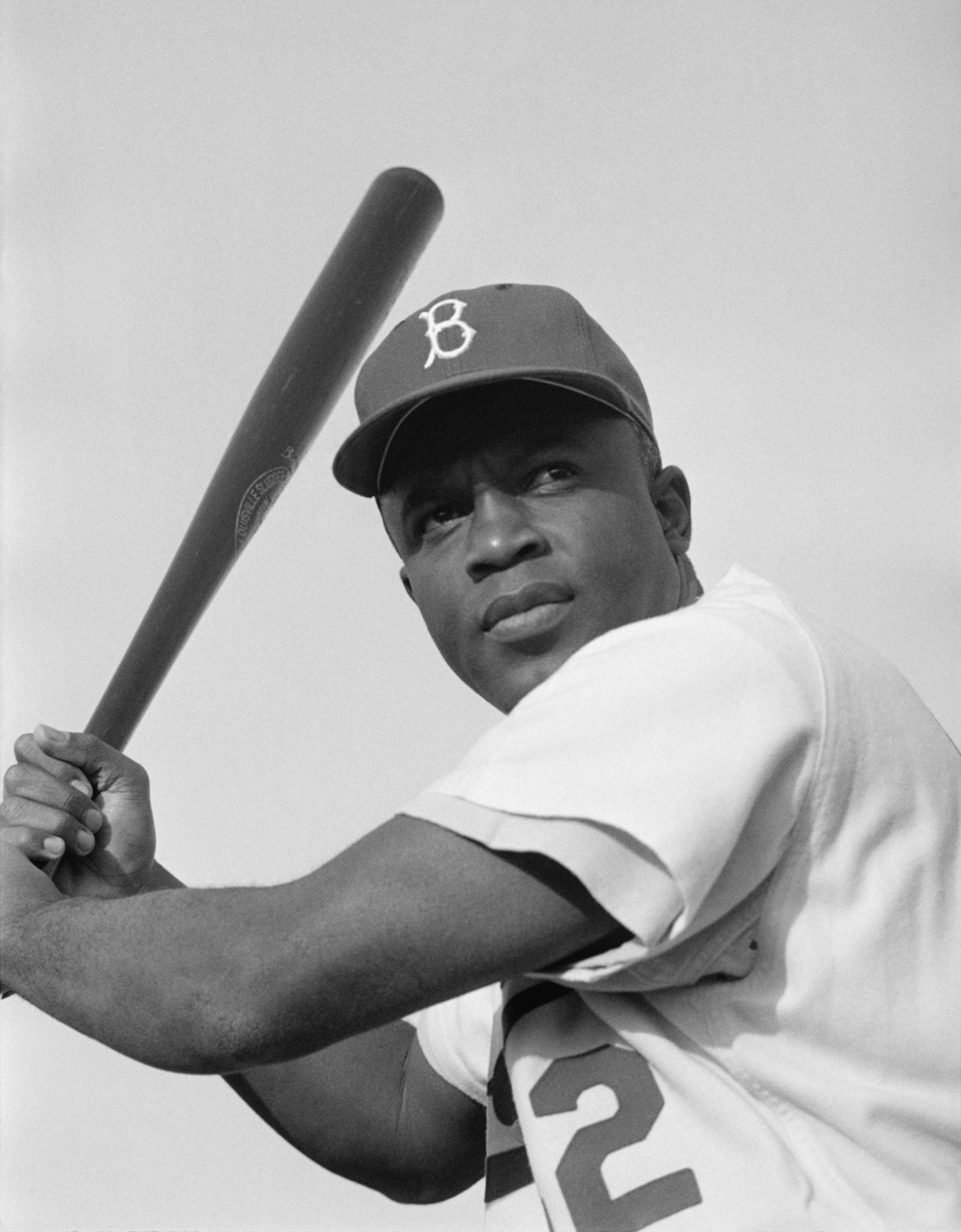
Jackie Robinson

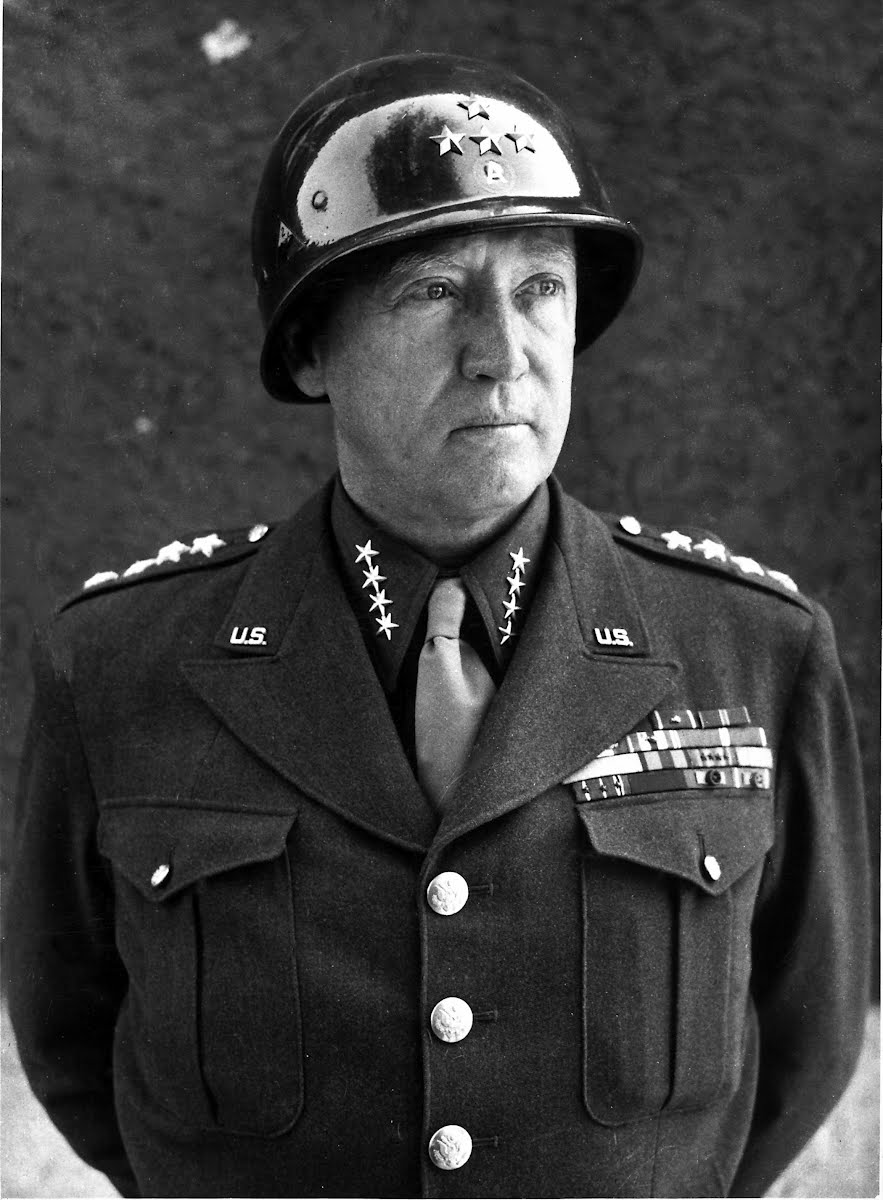
George S. Patton

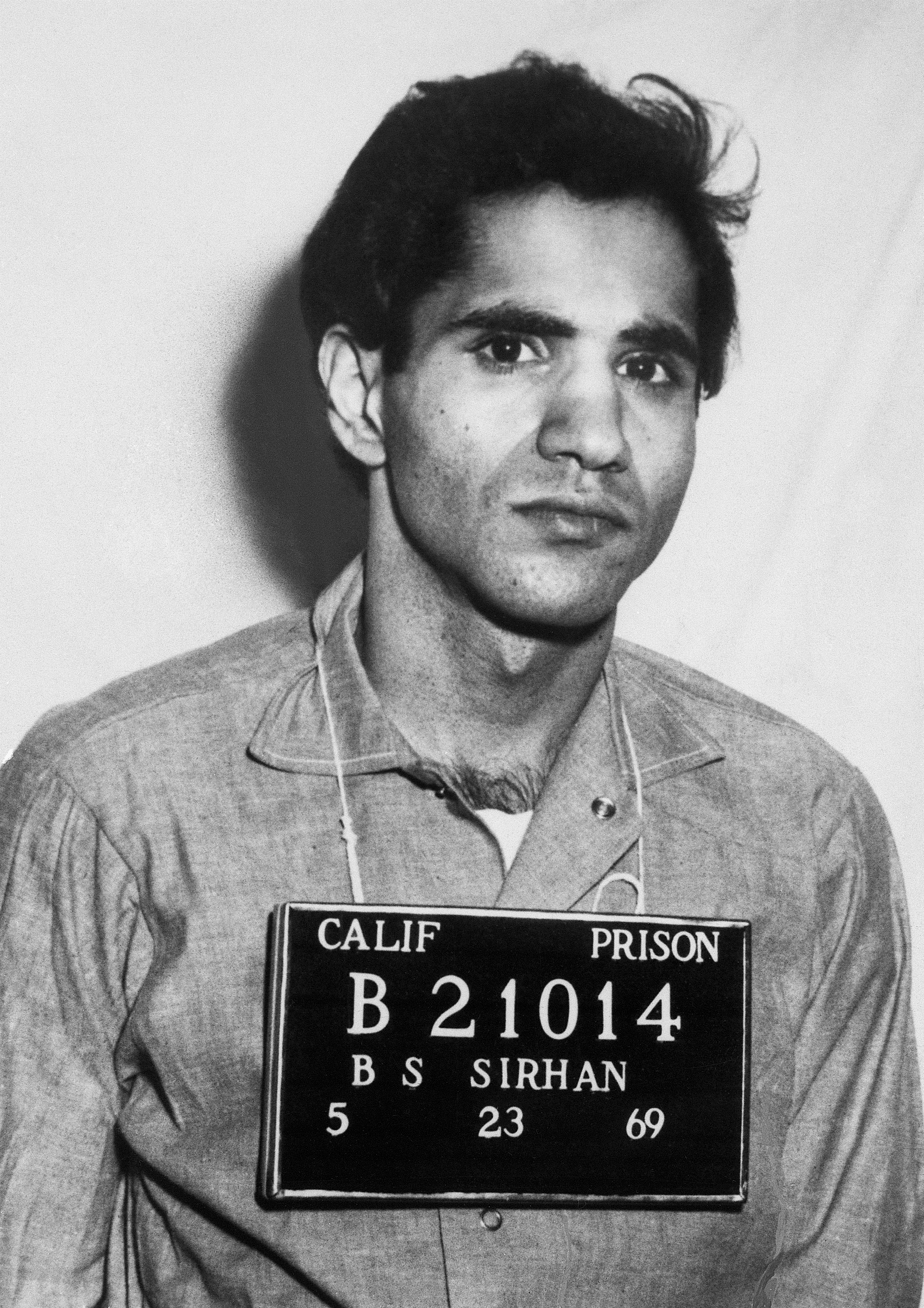
Sirhan Sirhan

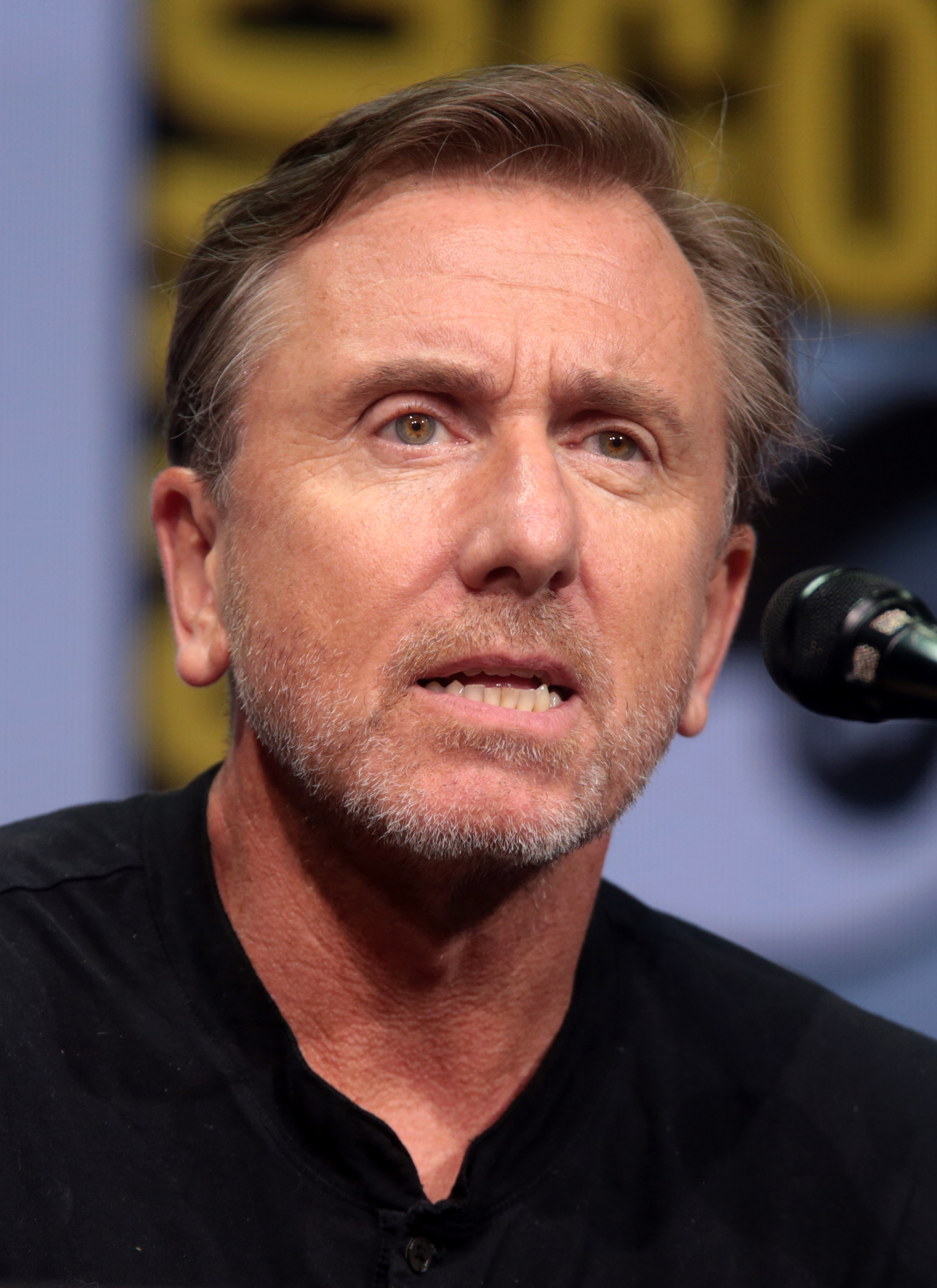
Tim Roth

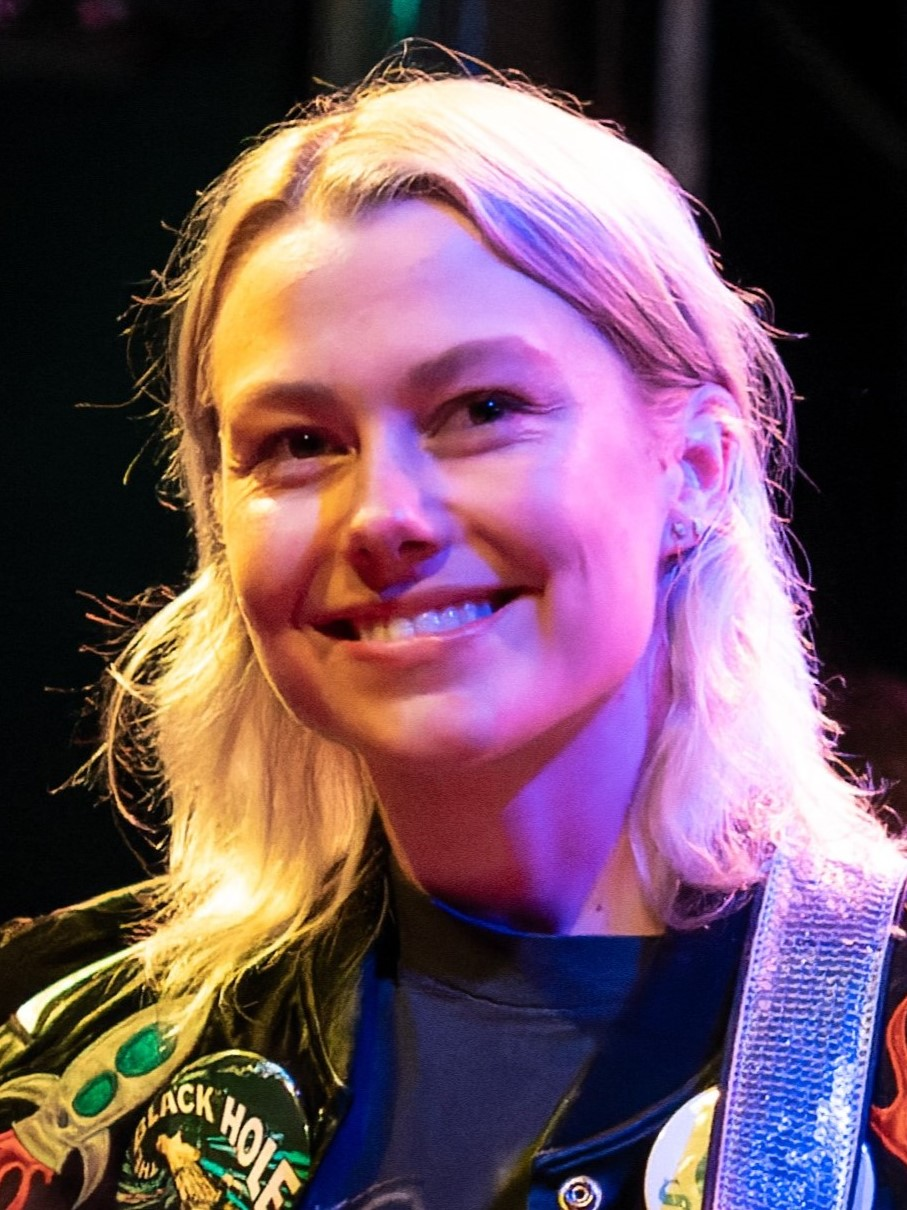
Phoebe Bridgers

== Academia ==
- Richard Feynman, Nobel Prize physicist, Caltech professor, raconteur
- J. Robert Oppenheimer (1904–1967), Caltech professor and later overseer of the Manhattan Project
- Murray Gell-Mann (1929–2019), Nobel Prize physicist, Caltech
- George Ellery Hale (1868–1938), astrophysicist, Caltech professor, founder Mount Wilson Observatory
- Edwin Hubble, astronomer, namesake for the Hubble Space Telescope, Caltech professor
- Todd M. Hutton, American medical academic and psychiatrist.
- F.O. Matthiessen (1902–1950), Rhodes Scholar, Harvard professor
- Robert A. Millikan (1868–1953), Nobel Prize physicist
- Thomas Hunt Morgan (1866–1945), Nobel Prize evolutionary biologist, geneticist, and embryologist
- Brian Stoltz (born 1970), Professor of organic chemistry at Caltech
- George Olah, Nobel Prize chemist, professor University of Southern California
- Linus Pauling, Nobel Prize-winning chemist, peace activist, Caltech
- Roger Revelle (1909–1991), founder of University of California, San Diego, father of concept of global warming
- William Shockley (1910–1989), Nobel Prize physicist, Caltech professor, inventor of the transistor
- Kip Thorne, Nobel Prize physicist for his contributions to the LIGO detector and the observation of gravitational waves, professor, Feynman theoretical physicist, Caltech

== Artists and designers ==
- Benjamin Chambers Brown, artist
- Howell Chambers Brown, artist
- Sigrid Burton, artist and painter
- Loren Cameron (1959–2022) photographer and activist
- Edward Cucuel, impressionistic painter
- Rafa Esparza, performance artist
- Eva Scott Fényes, watercolor artist
- A.B. Frost (1851–1928), American illustrator and painter
- Elmer Grey, architect
- Tom Jancar, contemporary art dealer Jancar Kuhlenschmidt Gallery
- Hugo Markl, artist, curator and creative director based in New York
- Jane Mulfinger, conceptual artist and educator
- R. Kenton Nelson, painter.
- Stan Sakai, cartoonist best known as creator of Usagi Yojimbo series
- Adele Watson, painter and lithographer

== Film and television ==
This is a partial list of actors, actresses, comedians, film producers, filmmakers, and television personalities.

- Kelly Asbury, film director, writer, illustrator, voice actor
- Meredith Baxter, actress
- Walt Becker, film director
- Summer Bishil, actress
- Whitney Blake, actress, director and producer
- Betty Brosmer, bodybuilder, model
- Sophia Bush, actress, TV series One Tree Hill and Chicago P.D., 82nd Rose Queen for 111th Tournament of Roses Parade (2000)
- Stephen Cannell, author, television and film producer
- Lily Collins, Hollywood film actress
- Christy Canyon, pornographic actress
- Cari Champion, moderator, ESPN First Take
- Rebecca De Mornay, film and television actress
- Jimmy Dore, comedian
- Michael Dorn, actor
- Cullen Douglas, actor, director, playwright
- Arthur Duncan, tap dancer
- Mary Beth Evans, actress
- Sally Field, two-time Academy Award-winning actress.
- W.C. Fields, comedian, actor, juggler and writer; died in Pasadena.
- Stan Freberg, comedian, satirist, recording artist.
- Harry Hamlin, actor
- Michelle Horn, actress
- Bret Iwan, fourth voice of Mickey Mouse
- Tamala Jones, actress
- Jane Lillig, actress
- Matthew Lillard, actor
- Kate Linder, actress
- Joel McCrea, actor
- Richard Moll, actor
- George Nader, actor
- Drew Pinsky, doctor and radio/TV personality
- Chris Pontius, actor/TV personality
- Karen Price, actress
- Kathleen Quinlan, actress
- Robert Reed, actor, best known as Mike Brady in The Brady Bunch television series
- George Reeves, actor, best known as star of television series Adventures of Superman; attended Pasadena Junior College.
- Tim Roth, actor.
- Christian Serratos, actress
- Jamey Sheridan, actor
- John Singleton, film director
- Kathleen Sullivan, television personality
- Charles Walters, film director
- Wil Wheaton, actor, writer
- Jaleel White, actor, producer, writer
- Bruce Yarnell, actor, singer

== Music ==
This is a partial list of musicians, songwriters singers, and band members.

- Steve Albini, producer and engineer
- Jon B., Grammy-nominated R&B singer-songwriter.
- Hodgy Beats, rapper
- Rodney Benford, member of new jack swing group Troop, attended Pasadena High School
- Phoebe Bridgers, singer-songwriter, guitarist, and producer
- Daniel Brummel, multi-instrumentalist, singer-songwriter for Ozma (band)
- Dâm-Funk, musician
- Jed the Fish, award-winning disc jockey who hosted the weekday afternoon drive slot on KROQ-FM in Los Angeles
- John "Jon Jon" Harreld, member of new jack swing group Troop, attended Pasadena High School
- Pete Jolly, jazz pianist
- Teena Marie, singer-songwriter, music producer
- Emil Dechebal Mătăsăreanu, electrical engineer and bank robber who is known for being one of the two men who initiated the North Hollywood Shootout, attended Pasadena High School
- Allen McNeil, member of new jack swing group Troop, attended Pasadena High School
- David Lee Roth, a lead singer for Van Halen, attended John Muir High School
- Steve "Random" Russell, member of new jack swing group Troop, attended Pasadena High School
- Ruwanga Samath, record producer, attended John Muir High School
- Alina Smith, musician
- Phil Spector, music producer
- Alex Van Halen, drummer for Van Halen, attended Pasadena High School
- Eddie Van Halen, lead guitarist for Van Halen, attended Pasadena High School
- Reggie Warren, member of new jack swing group Troop, attended Pasadena High School
- Marc Yu, child music prodigy on piano and viola

== Politicians ==
This is a partial list of politicians and judges.

- Lance Ito, judge, Los Angeles Superior Court
- Henry Markham (1840–1934), lawyer, politician, 18th governor of California. Resident of Pasadena.
- Bill Paparian, attorney, veterans' advocate and Mayor of Pasadena.
- Bill Richardson, governor of New Mexico
- James Roosevelt, U.S. Congressman, son of President Franklin Delano Roosevelt
- Mimi Walters, businesswoman and U.S. Congresswoman

== Sports ==
- Stacey Augmon, basketball player
- Myles Bryant, professional football player
- Susie Maxwell Berning, pro golfer
- May Sutton Bundy (1886–1975), first American to win Wimbledon tennis singles title
- Jeff Cirillo, MLB player for six teams
- Michael Cooper, NBA player for Los Angeles Lakers, coach
- Lillian Copeland (1904–1964), Olympic discus champion; set world records in discus, javelin, and shot put
- Tyler Dorsey (born 1996), Greek–American basketball player in the Greek Basketball League playing for Olympiacos
- Darrell Evans, MLB player
- Missy Franklin, swimmer, 5-time Olympic gold medalist
- Kristy Hawkins, IFBB professional bodybuilder
- Mary Ann Hawkins, surfer, swimmer and stunt double
- Charles Frederick Holder, inventor of big-game fishing and a founder of Pasadena's Tournament of Roses
- Ally Lemos, soccer player
- Chris McAlister, professional football player
- James McAlister, professional football player
- Mo Martin, LPGA golfer, 2014 British Open champion
- Inger Miller, track and field sprint athlete
- George Murdoch, WWE wrestler
- Tracy Murray, NBA Player
- Chris Pettit, MLB outfielder
- Durell Price, UCLA fullback
- Jackie Robinson, civil rights icon and Hall of Fame baseball player
- Mack Robinson, Olympic athlete, brother of Jackie Robinson
- Don Ross, Major League Baseball player
- Ashley Sanchez, soccer player for the United States
- Mark Smith, MLB player for five teams
- Stan Smith, professional tennis player, namesake of Stan Smith Tennis Shoe
- Brett Sterling, professional ice hockey player
- Brian Teacher, Australian Open tennis champion
- Lester Towns, professional football player
- Chase Utley, baseball player, Los Angeles Dodgers
- Peter Vagenas, soccer player
- Jacque Vaughn, professional basketball player and former head coach of the Brooklyn Nets
- Avery Williams, running back for the Atlanta Falcons
- Matt Young, MLB player for Boston Red Sox, Los Angeles Dodgers and Cleveland Indians.
- Jeff Yurak, MLB player for Milwaukee Brewers

Alice Brown, Olympic Sprinter 1980 (Boycott), 1984 and 1988

== Writers and journalists ==
- Carlton Beals (1893–1979), journalist
- Julie Berry, children's author
- Octavia Butler, award-winning science-fiction writer
- Otis Chandler, publisher, Los Angeles Times
- Justin Chapman, journalist, author, actor
- Julia Child, celebrated author and television chef
- Andre Coleman, Award-winning journalist and screenwriter
- Nahshon Dion, Award-winning creative non-fiction writer
- Winifred Starr Dobyns, author of California Gardens (1931)
- Harriet Doerr, author, winner of the National Book Award
- David Ebershoff, writer
- Michelle Huneven, writer
- Paul Fussell, critic and historian
- Mary Catherine Judd, educator, author, peace activist
- TJ Kirk, commentator and author
- Kathryn Le Veque, author
- Ottessa Moshfegh, author

== Others ==
- G. Vernon Bennett, Los Angeles City Council member, 1935–49
- Owen Brown (abolitionist) (1824–1889), son of John Brown, along with his brother Jason, his sister Ruth Brown Thompson, a teacher, and her husband
- Frederick Russell Burnham (1861–1947), celebrated scout and inspiration for the Boy Scouts
- Howard Burnham (1870–1917), mining engineer and spy
- Jeanne C. Smith Carr, educator, author
- Sheryl Cooper, dancer, dance instructor, and wife of the singer Alice Cooper
- Steve Crocker, internet engineer, member of the Internet Hall of Fame
- Gregory C. Horn, U.S. Navy Rear Admiral
- Myron Hunt, architect of Rose Bowl
- Howard W. Hunter, 14th president of the Church of Jesus Christ of Latter-day Saints
- Joseph J. Jacobs, engineer and founder of Jacobs Engineering Group
- Lucy Jones, seismologist
- Florence E. Kollock (1848–1925), Universalist minister and lecturer
- Jack Parsons, rocket scientist and occultist
- George F. Regas, rector of All Saints Episcopal Church 1967–1995, noted critic of U.S. involvement in Vietnam war as well as many other policy issues
- Ellen Browning Scripps, heiress, publisher, philanthropist
- Alvin Simon, restaurateur who revitalized Old Pasadena
- Sirhan Sirhan, resident of Pasadena at the time of assassination of Senator Robert F. Kennedy
- John Patten Story, U.S. Army major general
- Bertha L. Turner caterer, cookbook author, and community leader in Pasadena; active within the National Federation of Colored Women
- John Van De Kamp, attorney general of California
- Duong Van Minh, exiled president of South Vietnam
- Fawn Weaver is an American entrepreneur and author, and co-founder of Uncle Nearest Premium Whiskey.
- William Wrigley Jr., founder of Wrigley Chewing Gum, former owner of Chicago Cubs

== See also ==
- List of people from California
