= Chandler Vintage Museum of Transportation and Wildlife =

Defunct museum in California, US

Coordinates: 34.1830°N 119.1636°W

The Chandler Vintage Museum of Transportation and Wildlife, more commonly referred to as the Vintage Museum, has been the primary showcase for the collections of Otis Chandler since its foundation in 1987. The museum was located in Oxnard, California, designed by architect Vincent Dyer and home to Otis Chandler's extensive collection of vintage and rare automobiles, motorcycles, and trains as well as fine art and wildlife games. After its founder died, the collection was auctioned off in late 2006. The museum reopened in 2010 as the Mullin Automotive Museum, displaying the Peter W. Mullin collection, including 12 Bugattis from the former Schlumpf Collection.

== The collection ==
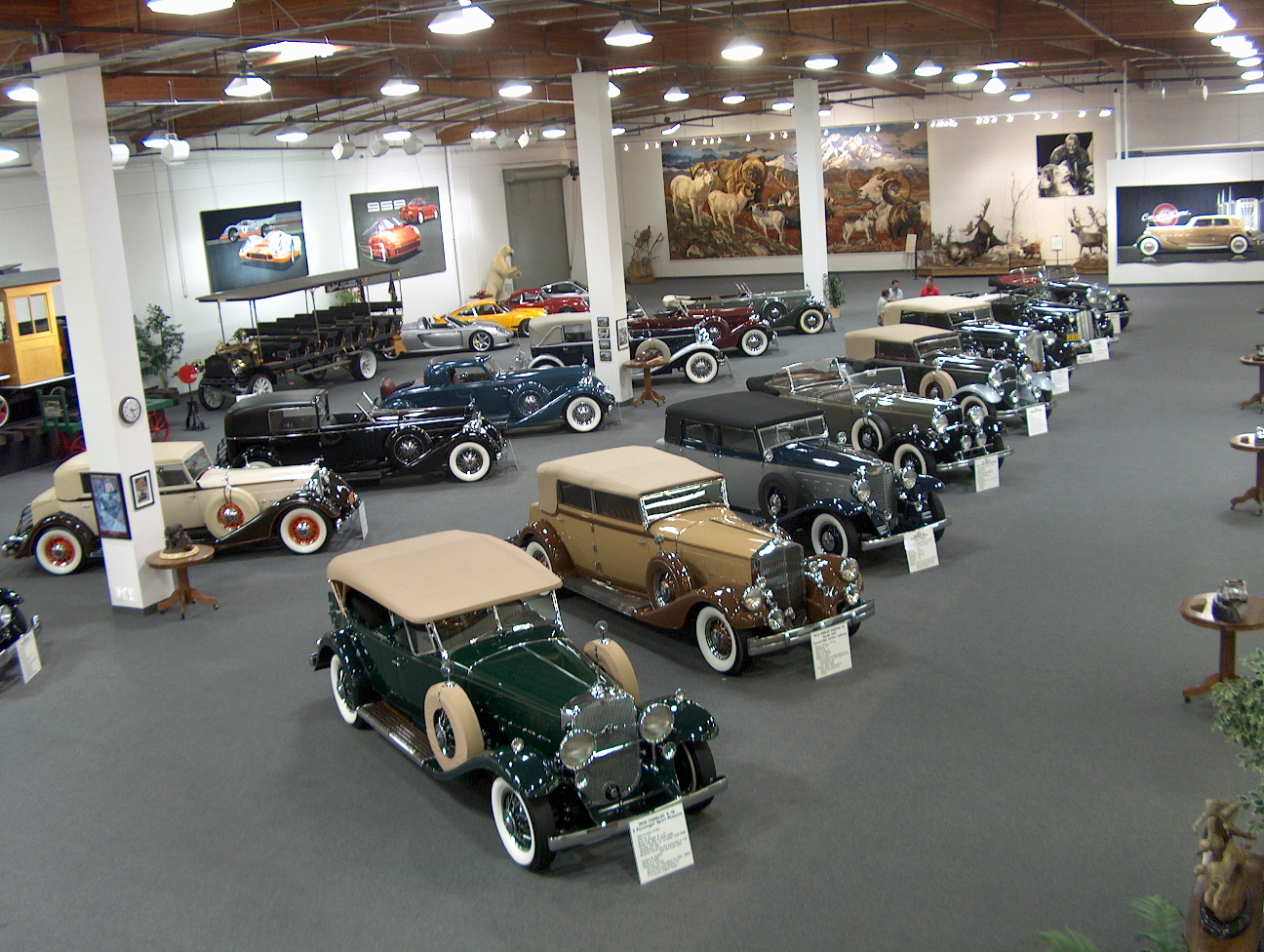
The Otis Chandler Museum shortly before it closed

=== Automobiles ===
The museum's automobile inventory included rare classic, antique, and sports cars. At various points in the museum's history, there was also an Ahrens-Fox pumper fire truck; a Mack truck and an 1894 Baldwin steam locomotive.

=== Motorcycles ===
The museum's sizeable motorcycle collection covered two floors of the museum. Over 50 makers were represented including Ace, Crocker, Iver Johnson, Indian, Vincent and Brough and over 80 years of the most important Harley-Davidson models ever built.

== Auction ==
On 21 October 2006, the collection was auctioned off by Gooding & Company. The auction fetched over $36 million, and set a record for a single day automotive auction.

== See also ==
- List of automobile museums
