= Orrin Augustine White =

American painter

- Born: 1883; Hanover, Illinois, U.S.
- Died: 1969 (aged 85–86)
- Education: University of Notre Dame
- Occupation: Painter

Orrin Augustine White (1883 - 1969) was an American painter. His studio was in Pasadena, California.

== Life ==
White was born in 1883 in Hanover, Illinois. He graduated from the University of Notre Dame in 1902. He was an assistant professor of Chemistry at the University of Portland in Oregon.

White began his artistic career as a textile designer until he became an interior designer in Los Angeles in 1906, and he took up painting in 1912. Two of his paintings were exhibited at the Panama–Pacific International Exposition in San Francisco in 1915. He served in World War I, and he later opened a studio in Pasadena. He was on the advisory council of the South Pasadena chapter of the National Society of Arts and Letters.

White gave private lessons in landscape painting to California artist Ben Abril.

White died in 1969. His work was exhibited by the South Pasadena chapter of the NSAL shortly after his death, and they set up the Orrin White Scholarship Fund in his memory. One of his paintings in the permanent collection of the Los Angeles County Museum of Art.
