= Ben Abril =

American painter (1923-1995)

Ben Abril (1923-June 7, 1995) was an American artist best known for his paintings of California, often depicting urban landscapes, vehicles, and buildings of historical interest. He also focused "on weathered buildings that have been standing for 100 years or more, on ghost towns, on old roads passing through rural places." His scenes of a now-vanished Los Angeles have become his most sought-after works.

== Education and early career ==
Abril was born in 1923, the son of Ventura Abril and Sarah Varela Abril.

After serving in the air force during World War II, Abril studied briefly at the Glendale School of Allied Arts with Arthur Beaumont (1890-1973). He then worked on night shifts at a post office in order to paint during the day. During these years he painted the circus and became interested in the Chinatown area of Los Angeles.

He returned to school in the late 1940s to study art at Glendale College and landscape painting at the Art Center School of Design with Trude Hanscom (born 1898). He studied architectural rendering at Chouinard Art Institute and took watercolor classes at the Otis Art Institute. Abril also studied privately with landscape painter Orrin A. White and painted with members of the California Water Color Society.

The County of Los Angeles hired him in 1955 as a cartographer and architectural draftsman, a position he held for some twenty years. He also worked for architectural firms and briefly as a scenic designer for Desilu Productions.

== Success as an artist ==
From 1959 to 1963, Abril embarked on a series of thirty-six paintings of old buildings, including dilapidated Victorian mansions, in the Bunker Hill area of downtown Los Angeles. His work attracted the attention of Alexander Cowie, one of the "big three" art dealers of Southern California, who in 1962 began to represent Abril.

During this period, Abril also illustrated three children's books about railroads by David Robert Burleigh, How Engines Talk (1961), Piggyback (1962), and Shoofly (1963).

A major exhibit of his work at the Cowie Wilshire Galleries in Los Angeles in 1964 was described as a "prodigious display" by Artforum:

Ben Abril does not worry overmuch about the esthetic problems. There are, nevertheless, few artists among the many Southern California scene painters who so obviously enjoy their profession and also manage to convey this exuberance to the observer as does Abril. Whether his subject is taken from the rolling hills, beaches, sunlit slums, or suburbs, he makes swift bold statements in pure blazing colors that emphasize his enthusiasm as well as his often injudicious composition. He apparently accepts his vision without question, recording what he sees unaltered, unselected, and unrefined. But this is not to say Abril’s reportorial style is a characteristic without merit, for with it he fulfills his intent—to transport you to the site depicted recognizable with the same familiarity as the old family homestead.

The 1964 Cowie exhibit was a watershed in Abril's career. That year, actor and art collector Vincent Price bought out Abril's entire studio, purchasing 37 paintings.

The United States Navy commissioned Abril to paint a series on Japan and another of the Mekong Delta in Vietnam for their collection. California governor George Deukmejian collected his work, as did President Richard Nixon, who in 1972 acquired one of Abril's Northern California seascapes.

In 1987, Abril was commissioned by Cardinal Mahoney to paint the San Fernando Mission; the work was presented to Pope John Paul II during his visit to Los Angeles, and is housed in the Vatican.

1987 also saw the release of Abril's book Images of a Golden Era: Paintings of Historical California, published in conjunction with an exhibition at the Los Angeles County Museum of Natural History and at the San Bernardino County Museum.

At least one of his paintings, a landscape with ruins along the Appian Way south of Rome, suggests Abril spent time in Italy.

Abril's technique was to begin with a "a lengthy study of the site, taking several photographs in different types of light. He may take 400 photos a week of various sites. By the time he puts brush to canvas he feels a kinship with his subject. 'You see an old barn or something and you stare at it long enough until you become that barn,' Abril says. 'Art is not what you do, it is what you are.'"

Abril died of complications from cancer on June 7, 1995, age 74, in La Cañada Flintridge, California.

== In museums and archives ==
Works by Abril in museums include:

- The Old Hall of Records (1966) at LACMA in Los Angeles.
- Rest by the Sea (c. 1960) at the Frye Art Museum in Seattle.
- Seven paintings at the Hilbert Museum of California Art in Orange: Victoria Beach—South Laguna (c. 1950), Newport Pier, Balboa, California (1950s), 3rd St. Tunnel and Angels Flight (c.1960), Mission Switching Tower (1960s), Randsberg, California (1960s), The Million Dollar (1980s), and Arroyo Seco Stables (1986).
- Six paintings in the art collection of the Naval History and Heritage Command, Washington, D.C.: Early Morning, Kamakura Buddha, Sunday Service—Base Chapel, USS Monticello in Drydock, Taxi Turn Authorized, and Reflections.

Abril also painted vintage cars, trucks, and trolley cars, and his work was represented in the art collection of the Mullin Automotive Museum in Oxnard, California.

A collection of Ben Abril archival materials, including photographs and press clippings, is conserved at the Seaver Center for Western History Research, Natural History Museum of Los Angeles County.

A photograph of Abril at work, dated 1952 and titled "Artist captures Bunker Hill residence," is in the collection of works by photographer Roy Hankey at the Los Angeles Public Library and can be viewed online.

== At auction ==
An auction record for a work by Abril was set by Grand Central Public Market on Hill Street Between 3rd and 4th Street, Los Angeles, California, From Bunker Hill—Circa 1939, auctioned at John Moran Auctioneers in 2017 with a hammer price of $22,500. This record price was matched in 2021 at the same auction house by the 1959 painting 3rd Street East Los Angeles.

== Sources ==
- Abril, Ben (illustrations) and Burleigh, David Robert (text). How Engines Talk, children's book, Chicago: Follett Publishing Company, 1961.
- Abril, Ben (illustrations) and Burleigh, David Robert (text). Piggyback, children's book, Chicago: Follett Publishing Company, 1962.
- Abril, Ben (illustrations) and Burleigh, David Robert (text). Shoofly, children's book, Chicago: Follett Publishing Company, 1963.
- Abril, Ben. "My Life as an Artist: Ben Abril—Autobiography," typescript, 1985, American Art Department files, LACMA.
- Abril, Ben. Images of a Golden Era: Paintings of Historical California, introduction by Leon C. Arnold, biography of Abril by Jean Napier Neely, published in conjunction with an exhibition at the Los Angeles County Museum of Natural History and the San Bernardino County Museum; Glendale, CA: Arthur H. Clark, 1987.
- "Abril, Ben (Benjamin)", Who’s Who in American Art, 1980, 1986.
- Bini, Ann. "Ben Abril: Capturing Old West with Heart, Soul, and Brush," Verdugo Newspaper Group, December 11, 1983, pt. A, p. 7.
- Los Angeles Times obituary: "Ben Abril; Artist Known for California Landscapes", June 12, 1995.
- Lovoos, Janice. "Ben Abril: The Ambience of the City," Southwest Art 11 (September 1981), pp. 90–95.
- Oplinger, Curt. "Ben Abril, Cowie Wilshire Galleries", Artforum, vol. 2, no. 7, January 1664, p. 47.
- Shimabukuro, Betty. "Artist is Always California Dreamin'", San Bernardino Sun, Vol. 114, No. 142, May 22, 1987, pp. D1-D2.
- Vega, Santos C. Mexicans in Tempe, Arcadia Publishing, 2009.
