= Harriet Doerr =

American author

- Born: Harriet Green Huntington; April 8, 1910; Pasadena, California
- Died: November 24, 2002 (aged 92); Pasadena, California
- Education: Smith College; Scripps College; Stanford University
- Occupation: Author
- Notable work: Stones for Ibarra
- Spouse(s): Albert Doerr, Jr. (m. 1930)
- Children: Michael, Martha

Harriet Huntington Doerr (April 8, 1910 – November 24, 2002) was an American author whose debut novel was published at the age of 74.

== Early life ==
A granddaughter of California railroad magnate and noted collector of art and rare books, Henry Edwards Huntington, Harriet Green Huntington grew up in a Pasadena, California, family that encouraged intellectual endeavors. She attended high school at Westridge School, in Pasadena. She then enrolled in Smith College in 1927, but transferred to Stanford University the following year where she was a member of Kappa Alpha Theta. In 1930, after her junior year, she left school and married Albert Doerr, Jr., a Stanford 1930 graduate whom she had known in Pasadena. The Doerrs spent the next 25 years in Pasadena, where they raised a son, Michael (d. 1995), and a daughter, Martha.

== Mexico ==
Albert Doerr's family owned the copper mine of El Orito in the Mexican state of Aguascalientes, in the city of Real de Asientos. Beginning in 1935, Harriet accompanied Albert on his many business trips there. In the late 1950s, the Doerrs moved to Mexico where Albert was engaged in restoring the mine. They remained until 1972 when Albert died, ten years after being diagnosed with leukemia. The time she spent in this small Mexican mining town would later provide Harriet with both the subject matter and the setting for much of her writing.

== Literary career ==
Following her husband's death, Harriet Doerr returned to California. At the suggestion of her son Michael, a 1953 Stanford graduate, she decided to finish the education which had been interrupted so long before by her marriage. She enrolled, first at Scripps College, and then once again at Stanford. In 1977, she took her BA degree in European history. She began writing while at Stanford, earned a Stegner Fellowship in 1979, and soon began publishing short stories.

Her first novel, Stones for Ibarra, was published in 1984 and won a National Book Award for Fiction. Her second novel, Consider This, Señora, was published in 1993, and a collection of short stories and essays, Tiger in the Grass: Stories and Other Inventions, followed in 1995. A television adaptation of Stones for Ibarra was presented by Hallmark Hall of Fame in 1988. In the last decade of her life, she was legally blind from glaucoma.

Doerr died in Pasadena in 2002.

== Bibliography ==
- Stones for Ibarra (1984)
- Consider This, Señora (1993)
- Tiger in the Grass: Stories and Other Inventions (1995)
