= Westridge School =

Prep school in Pasadena, California, US

Coordinates: 34.126526°N 118.156710°W

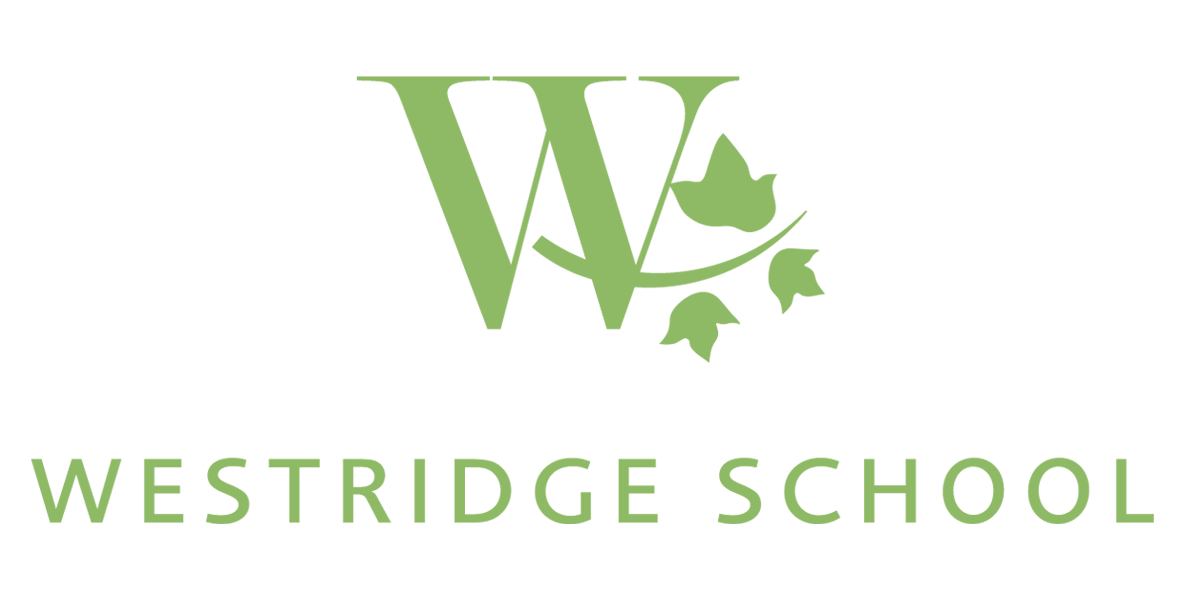

Location
- 324 Madeline Drive; Pasadena, California 91105; United States

Information
- Type: Private, Day, College-prep
- Motto: Surgere Tentamus (We strive to rise.)
- Established: 1913
- Founder: Mary Lowther Ranney
- Head of School: Andrea Kassar
- Faculty: 75
- Grades: 4–12
- Gender: Girls
- Enrollment: 550
- Student to teacher ratio: 7:1
- Colors: Green and white
- Athletics: 12 sports
- Athletics conference: CIF Southern Section Prep League
- Mascot: Tiger
- Website: www.westridge.org

Westridge School is a top-ranked independent day school for girls in grades 4-12, with three divisions: Lower (grades 4-6), Middle (grades 7-8) and Upper (grades 9-12). Founded in 1913 by architect and educator Mary Lowther Ranney, Westridge is located in Pasadena, California.

== Founding ==
=== Mary Lowther Ranney ===
Westridge founder Mary Lowther Ranney (1871-1939) moved to Pasadena in 1904 when she was 34 years old. A trained architect and educator, she had graduated from Kemper Hall Academy in Kenosha, Wisconsin, attended classes at the newly established University of Chicago, and taught at the University School for Girls in Chicago.

Soon after arriving in Pasadena, Ranney's family purchased a lot at 440 Arroyo Terrace, where they would build a house designed by Ranney herself. Ranney worked for many years with the Greene and Greene architectural firm, and taught privately in Pasadena. Before long, two Pasadena mothers—Margaret Brackenridge and Alexander Duer—began planning a school for girls near the Arroyo Seco, and Ranney was their choice of headmistress.

=== College preparatory school ===
From day one, Ranney intended for Westridge (so named for its location on the "west ridge" of town) to be a school that prepared girls for college—a novel idea in 1913, when most girls did not attend college.

Almost immediately, enrollment exceeded expectations. Ranney intended for Westridge to be located at the home she shared with her parents on State Street, but as a result of the overwhelming registration of 21 students during the summer of 1913, the Ranneys acquired a larger house on Madeline Drive and opened the doors of Westridge.

== Campus history and highlights ==
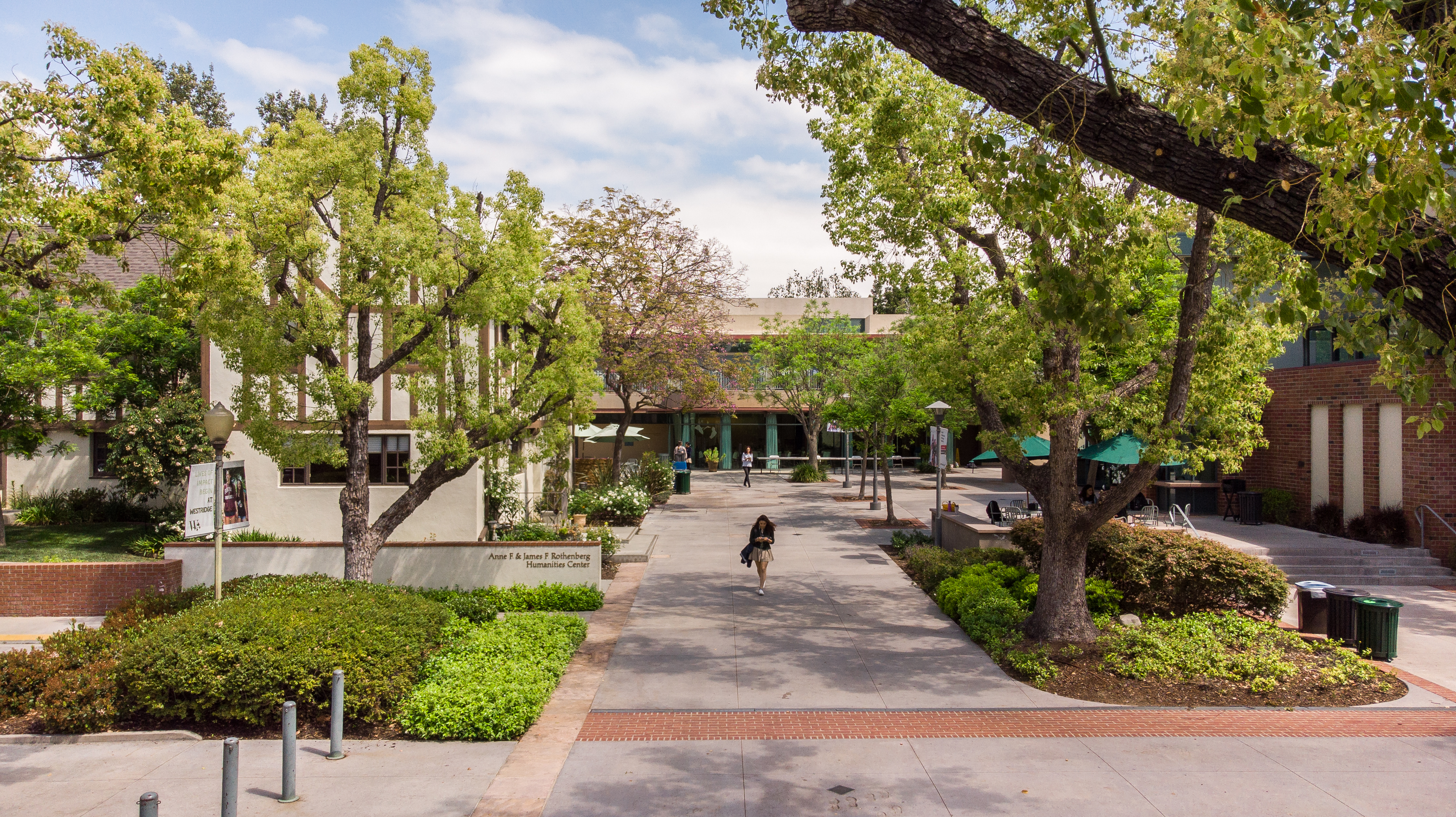
Madeline Court connects to Foreman Courtyard on the north side of the Westridge campus

Today, the Westridge campus is located in a residential neighborhood and includes landscaped grounds and buildings with historical architectural significance. The main building, designed by Marston, VanPelt & Maybury and completed in 1923 on the site of the original school, contains classrooms, administrative offices, and one of the school's four technology centers. The Burgess Exhibition Gallery in the main hall hosts student art exhibitions throughout the year.

Herrick Quadrangle, behind the main building, is bordered with both historic and contemporary architecture. Adjoining the main building are the Joan Irvine Smith '36 Academic Research Center and Braun Music Center, which is home to the Howard S. Swan Choral Hall.

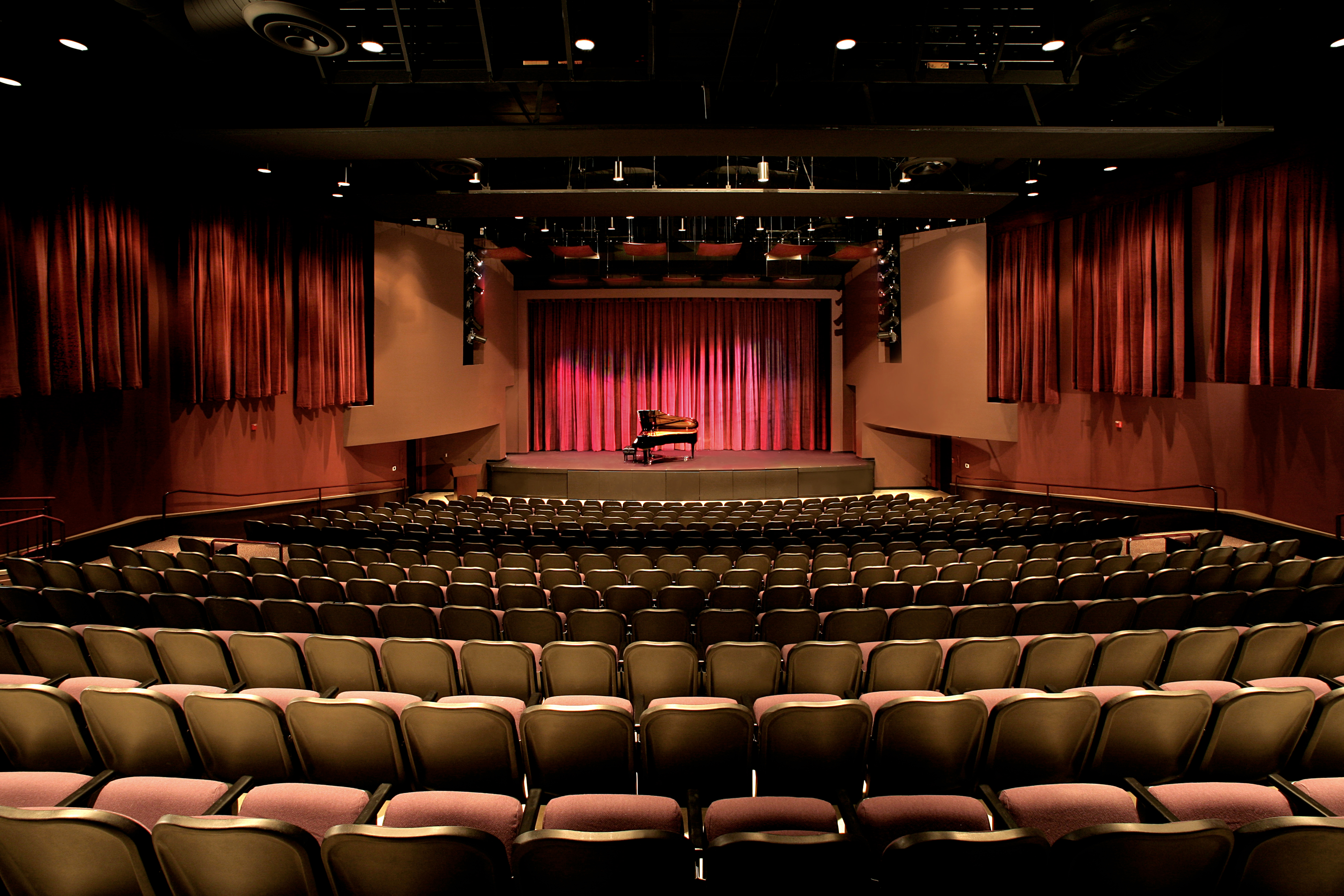
The Fran Norris Scoble Performing Arts Center opened in 2005.

The Braun Music Center was designed in 1909 as a private gymnasium and theater for a family estate on Orange Grove Boulevard by architect Frederick L. Roehrig, also known for designing the Green Hotel and the Tournament of Roses House in Pasadena. In 1958, Westridge parent Henry Dreyfuss added a larger and more functional stage to Braun Music Center.

Three other significant buildings on The Quad were designed by Pasadena architect Whitney R. Smith: the Seeley G. Mudd Science Building, with three fully equipped Upper School laboratories and a computer technology center, the Laurie and Susan Frank Art Studio and the Hoffman Gymnasium. The Richard N. Frank Athletic Field and Ranney Lawn provide recreational spaces for all grades.

In 1997, the school began a building program to enable the campus to better serve the needs of Westridge students and the space demands of an expanded, modern curriculum. Pica & Sullivan Architects designed the Marjorie May Braun '36 Science Building and the Karsh Family Science Garden that contain science classrooms and outdoor study spaces specifically designed for Lower and Middle School students. In April 2000, Westridge dedicated the Anne F. and James F. Rothenberg Humanities Center. The three-building complex also designed by Pica & Sullivan Architects, contains humanities classrooms and faculty offices, Upper School art studios and photography labs, art and photography exhibition space, the school's largest technology lab, and the Herrick Commons dining room.

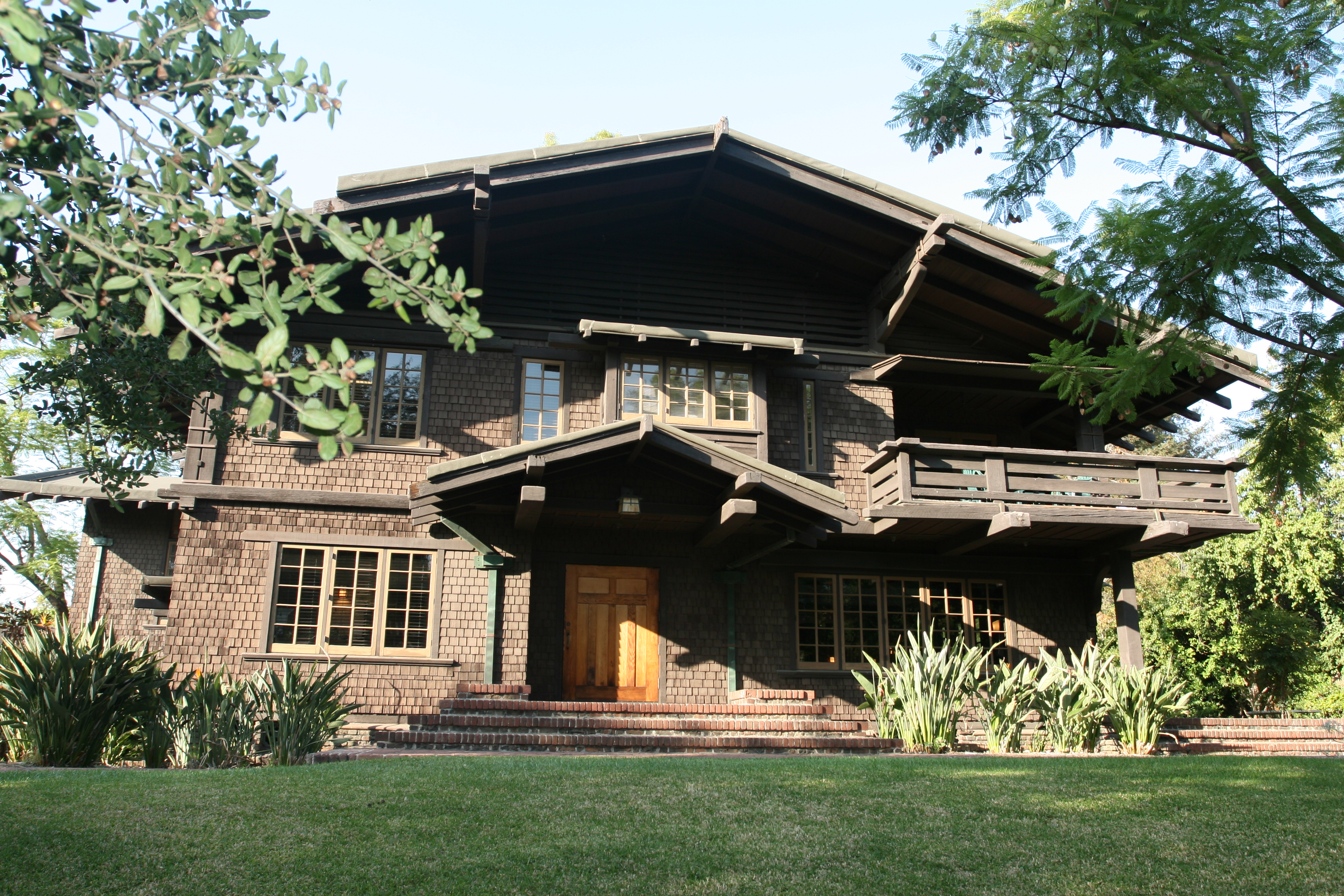
Pitcairn House was built in 1906 by Greene and Greene.

In 2004, Westridge unified the north and south campuses with the creation of Madeline Court. The following year brought the addition of the Rokus Athletic Complex where Tiger soccer and softball teams host games on new regulation fields. Dance is taught in Brown Studio and athletes take advantage of the Studenmund weight-training room.

In 2005, the Fran Norris Scoble Performing Arts Center opened. The facility includes a 600-seat auditorium, the Wagener Black Box Theater and the Seiter Family Amphitheater.

The oldest and most architecturally significant building sits on the southeast corner of the campus. Pitcairn House, built in 1906 by the architectural firm of Greene and Greene, is often featured in media for its classic California Bungalow style. It is the location of the school's business, communications, and advancement offices and was previously the location of the art department.

== Faculty and administration ==
Andrea Kassar, a Brearly School graduate, is the 12th and current head of school at Westridge, having served as the head of the upper school at Nightingale-Bamford School in Manhattan. She was appointed by the board of trustees on April 22, 2021, and succeeded Elizabeth J. McGregor, who retired in 2022 after a 13-year tenure at the school.

The previous heads of school at Westridge include:

- Elizabeth J. McGregor: 2009-2022
- Rosemary C. Evans '71: 2008-2009
- Fran Norris Scoble: 1990-2008
- Elsa M. Bowman: 1986-1990
- Nancy H. Owen: 1977-1986
- Katherine Trower: 1973-1977
- Elizabeth Edmundson Herrick: 1959-1973
- Gladys Peterson: 1945-1959
- Louise Holabird Wood: 1941-1945
- Anne Parker: 1938-1941
- Mary Lowther Ranney: 1913-1938

In addition to the head of school, there are two academic division directors on the administrative team: a director of Upper School, Dr. Melanie Arias, and a director of Lower & Middle School, Dr. Zanita Kelly.

Westridge has 75 faculty members, more than half of whom have over ten years of teaching experience. Nearly 75% of Westridge faculty hold advanced degrees.

The college counseling office is staffed by four counselors.

== Uniform ==
The primary aspects of the Westridge uniform feature a khaki skirt and solid white, black, green, or school-sponsored top. Upper School students also have the option to wear shirts and sweatshirts from on-campus student organizations. The formal uniform includes a white pleated skirt and a white polo shirt embroidered with the Westridge ivy logo. The formal uniform is worn several times per year, for Convocation and other special occasions.

== Discovery Week ==
Discovery Week is an experiential learning opportunity for Westridge students, taking place the week before spring break. This grants students the availability to take their studies outside of the classroom and possibly travel to different parts of the city, state, or even to other countries.

In Upper School, trips range from day trips exploring different historical, cultural, and artistic themes in Los Angeles and domestic travel, and an array of international trip options that students select based on their interests and curricular focuses. Each year there are several outdoor experiences and subject-specific trips, such as a civil rights tour of the south by Upper School choral students who performed and collaborated with local choirs. In Middle School, the seventh and eighth graders spend the week together in outdoor, technology-free educational experiences. For Lower School, Discover Week combines hands-on creative learning on campus with day trips to local environments related to their projects.

== Student groups and organizations ==
=== Clubs and affinities ===
Clubs and affinity groups at Westridge join girls with similar interests together to share knowledge, spread passion, build community, and affect change. Students lead and participate in a wide range of clubs including: Alliance, Amnesty International, Animal Club, Art, Asian Culture, Chess Club, Classic Films & TV, Girls Who Code, Green Guerillas, Help Africa, Junior Classical League (Latin), Korean Culture, LINK (Liberty in North Korea), Math Club, Model United Nations, Red Cross, Reach For Research, Science Olympiad/Robotics, Speech & Debate, Spyglass (student newspaper), Students for Social Justice, Take Back the Night, Theater Club, UNITY, Water Warriors, World Issues Club, Young Democrats, Young Republicans, and Zine Club.

Affinity groups include: Black Student Union, Non-Traditional Households Affinity, Christian Affinity, Chinese Affinity, Disabilities Affinity, Filipinx Affinity, Jewish Affinity, Latin Affinity, LGBTQ Affinity (or "Skittles"), Middle Eastern and North African (MENA) Affinity, Korean Affinity, Muslim Affinity, and more.

=== Student Voices ===
In addition to clubs and affinities, there are many groups at Westridge dedicated to creating spaces for discussion among the student body. One such group is Westridge Student Voices, a student-led leadership group that addresses topics related to diversity, equity, inclusion, and social justice. Student Voices is composed of Affinity Heads and Student Diversity Leadership Conference (SDLC) and White Privilege Conference (WPC) delegates. With a focused group of students, Student Voices raises awareness about local and global issues and events through student-led assemblies, town meetings, and lunch talks.

=== Westridgettes ===
Another beloved student group on campus is the Westridgettes. Known for their Tigers spirit and their green skirts embellished with puffy paint (bearing the names of students who have previously worn them), the Westridgettes are the student cheer squad that performs with the tiger mascot at assemblies and school events. Each Westridgette's skirt represents a different theme or aspect of the school, and there are currently 12 Westridgette skirts that align with athletics, drama, dance, prep, the Tiger mascot, and various student affinity groups. The Westridgettes have a long history at Westridge, with their origins in the late 1970s. Previously (in the mid-1970s), the Westridgettes were called the "Tigettes," and wore orange t-shirts, green gym shorts, and tiger feet.

== Notable alumnae ==
- Florence Lowe "Pancho" Barnes '19, early aviator, proprietor of The Happy Bottom Riding Club in Mojave, California and friend of America's best known test pilots
- Julia Child, celebrated chef, author, and television personality
- Harriet Doerr '27, author of the American Book Award winning novel, Stones for Ibarra
- Joan Hotchkis '45, author, playwright, and actress
- Joan Lamb Ullyot '57, physician, author, runner, and key figure in lobbying for a women's marathon in the Olympic Games
- Genna Rae McNeil '65, professor of history at the University of North Carolina, Chapel Hill
- Sigrid Burton '69, artist and painter
- Allyn Stewart '74, film producer of "Sully", "Madeline", "Land" "Trial by Fire"
- Anne Kursinski '76, world champion rider and member of four Olympic equestrian teams
- Inger Miller '90, runner, Olympic gold medalist
- Stacey Tappan '91, leading soprano opera singer
- Megan McGinnis '96, Broadway actress, singer
- Sophia Bush '00, actress, 82nd Rose Queen for the 111th Tournament of Roses Parade in 2000, Brooke Davis in One Tree Hill, and Detective Erin Lindsay on Chicago P.D.
- Lauren Gibbs '02, bobsledder, USA national women's team, 2018 Winter Olympic silver medalist
- Rebecca Rittenhouse '07, actress Blood & Oil
- Erica Wu '14, table tennis player, 2012 Olympian

== Memberships and affiliations ==
Westridge is accredited by the Western Association of Schools and Colleges and the California Association of Independent Schools.

Additionally, the school is a member of the following organizations:

- National Association of Independent Schools
- International Coalition of Girls' Schools
- The College Board
- The National Association for College Admission Counseling
- The National Association of Principals of Schools for Girls
- A Better Chance, Inc.
- The Cum Laude Society
- Council for Spiritual and Ethical Education
- The Independent School Alliance for Minority Affairs.
