= Victor Matson =

American painter

- Born: March 18, 1895; Salt Lake City, Utah
- Died: March 18, 1972 (aged 77); South Pasadena, California, U.S.
- Education: Studied with Jack Wilkenson Smith
- Known for: Painting, Printmaking, Photography
- Movement: California Plein-Air, American Impressionism
- Awards: Statewide Purchase Prize, 1939

Sierra Landscape, Oil on Panel, 18" x 24"

Victor Stanley Matson (1895–1972) was an American artist representative of the California Plein-Air school of painting. He was active from the 1920s until his death. An active organizer for several Southern California arts organizations, he served as president of the historic California Art Club from 1961 to 1962. His work was widely exhibited with the Southland art clubs in an era when few galleries were interested in Plein-Air landscapes and he had a solo exhibition at Los Angeles City Hall in 1964.

Matson studied landscape and marine painting with Jack Wilkinson Smith and William T. McDermitt; print making with Frank Geritz; and etching with Trude Hanscom.

== Early life and education ==
Matson was born and grew up in Salt Lake City, part of the large community of people of Scandinavian descent that had immigrated in the era of Mormon settlement in the 19th century. He attended military school and learned to fly as a young man.

He graduated from the University of Utah with a bachelor of science degree in mechanical engineering. Also interested in art, he studied drawing, perspective and rendering while at college. Matson moved to Southern California to take an engineering job in 1922, settling first in Long Beach. Then, in 1924, he and his wife Virginia, purchased a home in South Pasadena just north of Alhambra Park and the Los Angeles suburb of Alhambra.

== Art studies in California ==
Once he settled in South Pasadena and began working as an engineer for the city of Los Angeles, Matson began to study art in earnest. During the 1920s, Alhambra, California there was a small arts community on Champion Place, known as "Artist's Alley," where Jack Wilkinson Smith (1873–1949), Frank Tenney Johnson (1874–1939) and Clyde Forsyth (1885–1962) had their homes and studios and where Norman Rockwell (1894–1978) spent many of his summers.

Matson studied privately and painted with Jack Wilkinson Smith and made trips to the desert to paint with the Alhambra painters. He also studied at the Businessman's Art Institute near downtown with W.T. McDermitt (1884–1961) and privately with Trude Hanscom (1890–1975).

"Home in the Foothills" Oil on Canvas, 18" x 24" (c. 1950) Private Collection

== Painting career ==
Victor Matson was part of the Arroyo Arts and Crafts Movement. This movement of artisans and artists was in its last years and was based in and around Pasadena, South Pasadena and Highland Park, California, on the banks of the large wash that descended from the San Gabriel Mountains. By the early 1930s, Matson was exhibiting his work. He exhibited extensively with all of the major Southern California art organizations from then until the late 1960s. He won dozens of awards in local and regional competitions including the Purchase Prize at the California Statewide Exhibit in 1943 and 1946, where his paintings joined the official California State Collection. Matson had solo exhibitions at the Los Angeles Arts Center, the Alhambra City Hall, the Glendale Art Association and the Beverly Hills Women's Club. In 1965 he had a special exhibition in the rotunda of the Los Angeles City Hall. During the peak year of Matson's career there were few museum venues or professional galleries interested in traditional paintings that originated out of doors and so artists like Matson were forced to exhibit in less prestigious venues. Matson participated in many shows at places like the Greek Theatre (Los Angeles), the Friday Morning Club, the Duncan Vail Galleries, the Hollywood Women's Club, the Pasadena City Library, Bullocks Department Store, the Eden Club and even local banks.

Image for Christmas card, 1925, Private Collection

== Camera pictorialism ==
Victor Matson was part of the large pictorialist movement in Southern California. The "blurred aesthetic" of camera pictorialism seems to be of natural appeal to an artist who was interested in Impressionism. He was a member of the Camera Pictorialists of Los Angeles, a group that was founded in 1914 had an annual exhibition at the Los Angeles Museum of History, Science and Art, beginning in 1918. Matson participated in the organizations salons from the 1920s through the late 1930s and he also exhibited internationally. For example, the 1936 catalog from the 19th Annual Salon at the Los Angeles Museum lists two photographs by Matson, "April" and "Angel's Landing, Zion Canyon." Matson's photographs were usually subjects that were similar to his paintings, landscapes and harbor scenes. He was an active in photography from the 1920s through the 1940s. His photographs are in the collection of the Los Angeles County Museum of Art.

== Printmaking ==
Matson was an enthusiastic printmaker. In the 1920s, he studied with Franz Geritz (1895–1945), one of Southern California's preeminent printmakers. In the last days of the Arts and Crafts Movement he made woodblock prints of familiar California subjects like the San Gabriel Mission, palm trees, and his own home. He also studied etching and other printmaking techniques. Among other venues, his prints were exhibited at El Alisal, the Charles Fletcher Lummis (1859–1928) home in Highland Park, California.

Mountain Grandeur" Oil on Canvas, 25" x 30" (c.1940) Private Collection

California Palms, Woodblock Print, Private Collection

== Leadership of Southland art organizations ==
For several decades, Matson was one of the most active artists on the Southern California art club scene. He served as an officer for virtually every Southland art organization and was President of the California Art Club, the Painters and Sculptors Club and the Scandinavian-American Art Association. Matson and his wife Virginia, who was an Honorary Member of the California Art Club, helped to organize exhibits for many of the clubs at a time when few galleries were interested in the Impressionist landscapes. Between World War II and the mid-1970s, when interest in Plein-Air painting was at its lowest ebb, he played a crucial role in keeping these traditional organizations operating and the painterly landscape before the public.

== Methods and assessment ==
Matston's work all originated out of doors with pencil sketches or small paintings. He usually worked "en plein air" in sizes ranging from 16" x 20" to 18" x 24". Matson augmented his outdoor studies with notes and photographs. He "worked up" larger paintings in the studio, which usually ranged from 22" x 28" to 26" x 32." There is no record of Matson painting major "exhibition size" works. He painted more scenes of the Mojave desert than any other location and he joined Sam Hyde Harris on many trips to the desert. Matson did paint coastal landscapes and marines on occasion, but they are rare in his oeuvre. Matson did paint in the Sierras, but his trips there were infrequent. He did a few scenes of Utah and Colorado during family vacations. Matson's style of work was straightforward, heavily influenced by his teacher Jack Wilkinson Smith, but it seldom had the subtlety of Smith's work or the awareness of light that was the hallmark of the finest California Plein-Air Painters. His work could be somewhat "blocky" and stylized with large planes of broad brushwork. Matson was never a major California painter but he served as an important link in maintaining the Plein-Air tradition.

== See also ==
- Impressionism
- California Plein-Air Painting
- American Impressionism
- En plein air
- California Art Club
- Pictorialism
- Landscape art
- Printmaking
- Woodblock printing

== Memberships and Affiliations ==
- California Art Club, Los Angeles, California (President, 1961–1962)
- Painters and Sculptors of Los Angeles, Los Angeles, California (President, 1964)
- Laguna Beach Artists Association, Laguna Beach, California
- American Artists Professional League, New York, New York
- Valley Artists Guild, Los Angeles, California
- Scandanvian-American Art Association, Los Angeles, California
- San Gabriel Artists Association, San Gabriel, California
- The Camera Pictorialists of Los Angeles, Los Angeles, California
- Print Makers Society of California, Los Angeles, California
- Businessmen's Art Institute, Los Angeles, California

== Bibliography ==
- Merrell, Eric, Historic Artists of the California Art Club, California Art Club Website, 2010
- Merrell, Eric, Presidents of the California Art Club, California Art Club Website, 2010
- Dunbier, Lonnie Pearson (Editor), The Artists Bluebook, Ask Art, Online Art Dictionary, 2005
- Davenport, Ray, Davenport's Art Reference (The Gold Edition), Ask Art, Online Art Dictionary, 2005
- Hughes, Edan Milton, Artists in California: 1786-1940, Ask Art, Online Art Dictionary, 2002 and 1989
- Falk, Peter Hastings, Who was Who in American Art, 1564-1975, Ask Art, Online Art Dictionary, 1999
- Morseburg, Jeffrey, Style 1900, California Painting During the Arts and Crafts Period, 1997
- Falk, Peter Hastings, Southwest Art, The Red Book, Ask Art, Online Art Dictionary, 1993
- Morseburg, Jeffrey, Victor Matson: 1895-1972, 1989 (Exhibition Catalog)
- Jaques Cattell Press, Who's Who in American Art, 1976 (12th Edition), Ask Art, Online Art Dictionary, 1976
- The Camera Pictorialists of Los Angeles, 19th Annual Salon of Pictorial Photography, 1936
- The Pictorialist: A Compilation of Photographs from the Fourteenth Annual International Salon of Pictorial Photography, 1931 (Camera Pictorialist Catalog)
- Ask Art, Online Art Dictionary, Artist's Summary Page
