= Kathleen Sullivan (journalist) =

American journalist

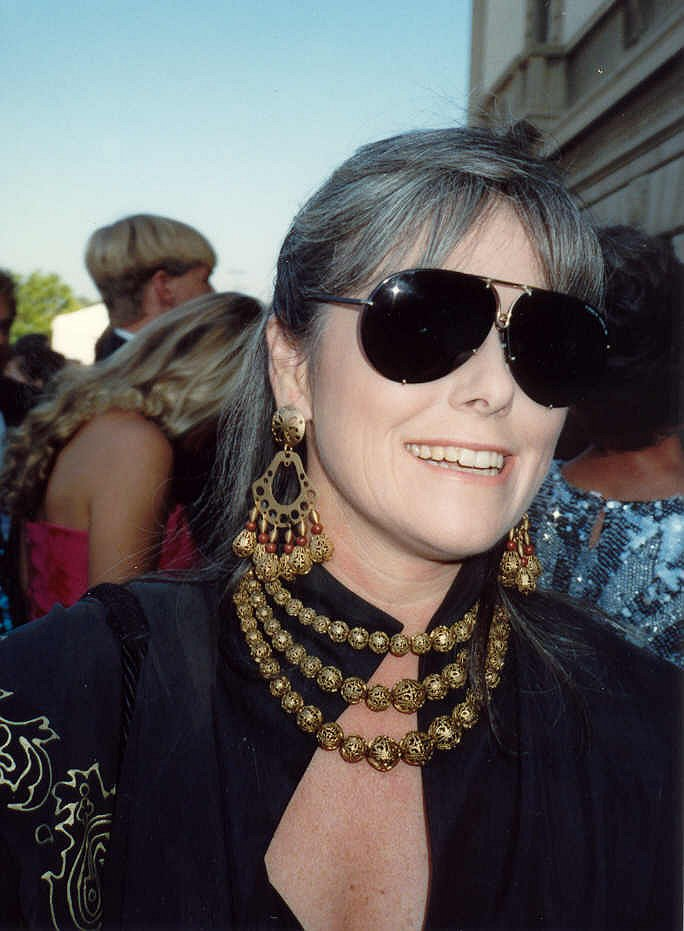
- Sullivan on the red carpet at the 41st Primetime Emmy Awards in 1989
- Born: May 17, 1953 (age 73); Pasadena, California, U.S.
- Occupation: Journalist

Kathleen Sullivan (born on May 17, 1953) is an American television journalist.

She was hired as a news anchor for the newly founded news channel CNN in 1980, when she was 27 years old, and she has also worked for ABC News, CBS News, and The Huffington Post.

== Early life and education ==
She was born in Pasadena, California, and attended Santa Catalina School in Monterey, California.

== Career ==
=== CNN ===
Starting her career in local television, she became the first female anchor hired by CNN in 1980.

She became the first American woman to broadcast live from the Soviet Union when she went there to interview Russian cosmonauts for the Soviet Pre-Olympic festival. In 1980, Sullivan was picked by Ted Turner to help launch his Cable News Network.

=== ABC News ===
Moving to ABC News, she debuted ABC World News This Morning with co-anchor Steve Bell in 1982, substituted for co-host Joan Lunden on Good Morning America, anchored ABC World News Saturday, and started the first national-network health program, The Health Show. During the 1980s, Sullivan reported live from party conference, summit, state funerals and the Olympic Games. She broadcast live from Buckingham Palace in London to report the list of royal weddings of Charles, Prince of Wales and Diana, Princess of Wales.

In 1984, Sullivan became the first woman to anchor a telecast of the Olympic Games. She was an in-studio anchor for ABC Olympic broadcasts during the 1984 Winter Olympics, held in Sarajevo, and later that year during the 1984 Summer Olympics, held in Los Angeles, California.

=== CBS News ===
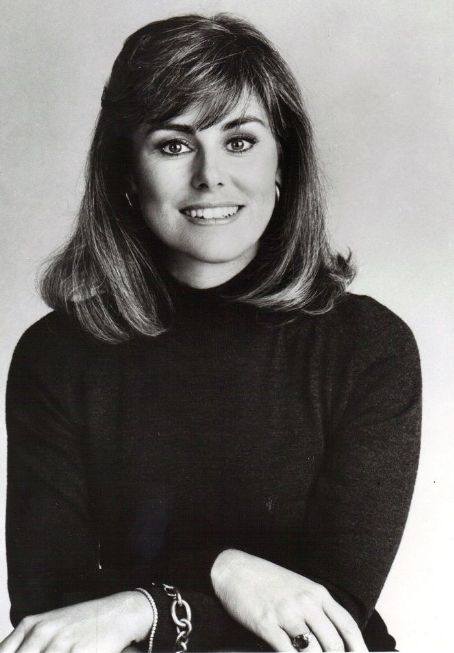
Sullivan as Co-Anchor of CBS This Morning, 1988

In 1987, Sullivan moved to CBS News to become co-anchor with Harry Smith of CBS This Morning. She served as co-anchor of the program from November 30, 1987 until February 23, 1990, after which she left CBS News. During her time at CBS, Sullivan was the only American journalist invited by President of the United States Ronald Reagan to a 1987 White House state dinner honoring General Secretary of the Communist Party of the Soviet Union Mikhail Gorbachev and celebrating the end of the Cold War. Her reporting in 1989 on Hurricane Hugo in South Carolina won her and CBS News an Emmy Award for Outstanding General Coverage of a Single Breaking News Story. On her firing from CBS Sullivan stated, "They called me old, unattractive and said, 'No one wants to look at her anymore,' " Sullivan told a reporter. "I broke a lot of news interviews, but that wasn't important to them."

=== NBC News ===
Kathleen Sullivan anchored the 1992 Summer Olympics, held in Barcelona, for NBC's pay-per-view Olympics Triplecast.

=== Radio ===
She has also worked in radio, doing weekly commentaries for ABC News and working in Los Angeles as a talk-show host on KABC and as a drive-time anchor for the all-news station KFWB, 1999-2000.

=== Later work ===
Sullivan was the host of two syndicated health shows in the 1990s.

In the mid-1990s, she appeared in television and magazine ads as a spokesperson for Weight Watchers.

=== E! ===
Sullivan received an Emmy nomination for Best Sportscaster – a first for a woman – and received two Emmy nominations for her work as anchor of E!'s E! News Daily, which she hosted after anchoring full-time coverage of the 1995 O. J. Simpson murder case.

=== Awards and honors ===
She has been nominated for Emmy Awards in news, sports and entertainment.

== Memberships ==
=== Substance Abuse and Mental Health Services Administration advisory board member ===
Sullivan is a member of the National Advisory Board of the Substance Abuse and Mental Health Services Administration – a branch of the U.S. Department of Health and Human Services – to which she was appointed in 2003 by the U.S. Secretary of Health and Human Services Tommy Thompson.

== In popular culture ==
She has made various cameo appearances as herself in various entertainment television programs including the episode "Millions from Heaven" (1996) of the television sitcom series Roseanne (1988–1997), reporting on the list of Roseanne and The Conners characters winning the lottery.

== See also ==
- List of CNN personnel
- List of people from Pasadena, California

| Preceded by Mariette Hartley | CBS This Morning co-anchor November 30, 1987-February 23, 1990 | Succeeded by Paula Zahn |
