= Trude Hanscom =

American painter

- Born: Gertrude Fandrich; December 6, 1890; Oil City, Pennsylvania
- Died: June 7, 1975 (aged 84)
- Occupations: Painter; printmaker; teacher

Gertrude "Trude" Hanscom née Gertrude Fandrich (December 6, 1890 - June 7, 1975) was an American painter, printmaker, and teacher.

== Early life ==
Hanscom was born on December 6, 1890 in Oil City, Pennsylvania and raised in Waterloo, New York.

== Education ==
Hanscom worked as a stenographer in Geneva, New York, eventually studying art at Syracuse University and Kline's School of Graphic Arts at the Syracuse Museum of Fine Art. In California, she studied at Otis College of Art and Design, USC, and the UCLA, also studying privately under the direction of western landscapist Sam Hyde Harris.

== Career ==
Hanscom moved to Southern California around 1930. She worked as an art instructor, privately instructing clients such Victor Matson and Ben Abril, as well as teaching in public schools in Alhambra, Glendale, and San Gabriel. Gaining recognition for her work, Hanscom was granted a solo exhibition in 1937 at the Charles W. Bowers Memorial Museum in Santa Ana. In 1938, she exhibited at the San Gabriel Artists' Guild. As her popularity grew, Hanscom became involved in a number of art associations, such as the Women Painters of the West, for which she served as their first vice president. She was also a participant in the California Art Club, the California Printmakers, the Society of American Graphic Artists, the Glendale Art Association, and the Pasadena Society of Artists.

=== Collections ===
Hanscom's work became part of the collections of the Metropolitan Museum of Art, the Library of Congress, the National Gallery of Art, the Wichita Art Museum. Pennsylvania State University, and the California State Library.

== Awards and recognition ==
- Julia Ellsworth Ford Prize for Oil Painting, 1943.
- Honorary Life Membership, Society of American Graphic Artists, 1965.

== Select works ==
- Soledad, 1930
- Homesteading, 1940-1945

== Personal life ==
In the late 1920s, Hanscom married Charles G. Hanscom.
