= Mullin Automotive Museum =

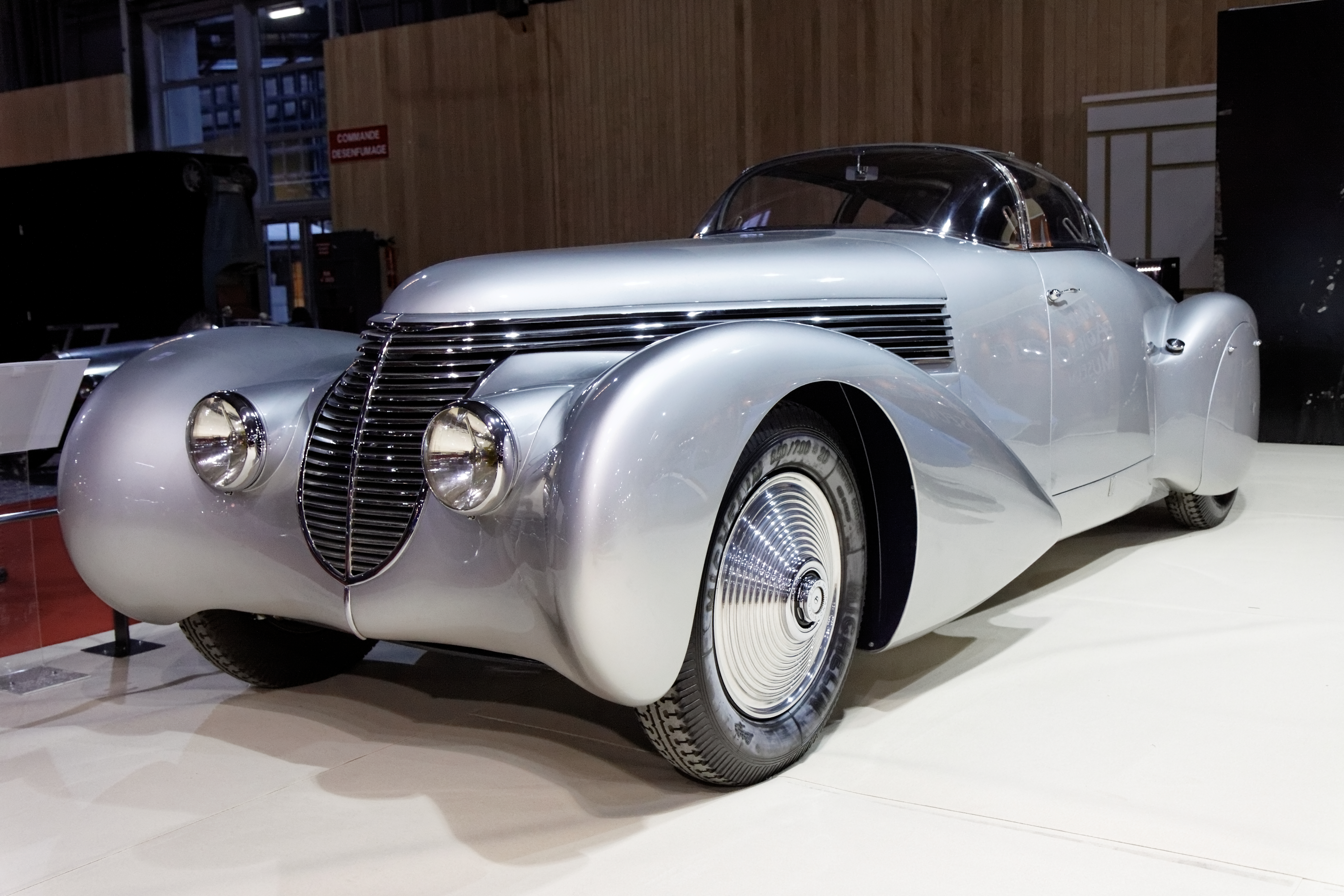
- The museum's Hispano-Suiza H6B Dubonnet Xenia

- Location within California
- Established: 2010; 16 years ago
- Location: 1421 Emerson Avenue; Oxnard, CA 93033; US
- Coordinates: 34°10′58.8″N 119°09′48.8″W
- Type: Automobile museum
- Architect: David Randall Hertz
- Website: Mullin Automotive Museum

The Mullin Automotive Museum was a privately owned automobile museum in Oxnard, California, US. Established in 2010, it displayed the personal car collection of businessman and philanthropist Peter W. Mullin. The museum had a large collection of vintage Bugattis and other early 20th century French cars. Many of the cars were fully restored and able to be driven, while others were left purposely unrestored to preserve their history. After the founder’s death in September 2023, the museum closed on February 10, 2024. Many of the cars from the collection were subsequently auctioned off, while some were transferred to other collections, such as the Hispano-Suiza Dubonnet Xenia, which went to the Petersen Automotive Museum.

The museum was housed in the building formerly occupied by the Chandler Vintage Museum of Transportation and Wildlife. The 50,000 sq ft (4,600 m^{2}) building was remodeled to be more energy efficient by American architect David Randall Hertz, making use of solar panels and reflective roofing to reduce heat, yet incorporating elements that retain the Art Deco style and motifs in order to match the era of the cars, many of which were made by French manufacturers in the 1920s and 1930s.

Although it was primarily known for its selection of classic French automobiles and grand prix race cars, the Mullin also housed a collection of Art-Deco furniture and contemporary paintings and sculpture, including works by Charles Arnoldi, Ben Abril, and Sigrid Burton.

== Gallery ==
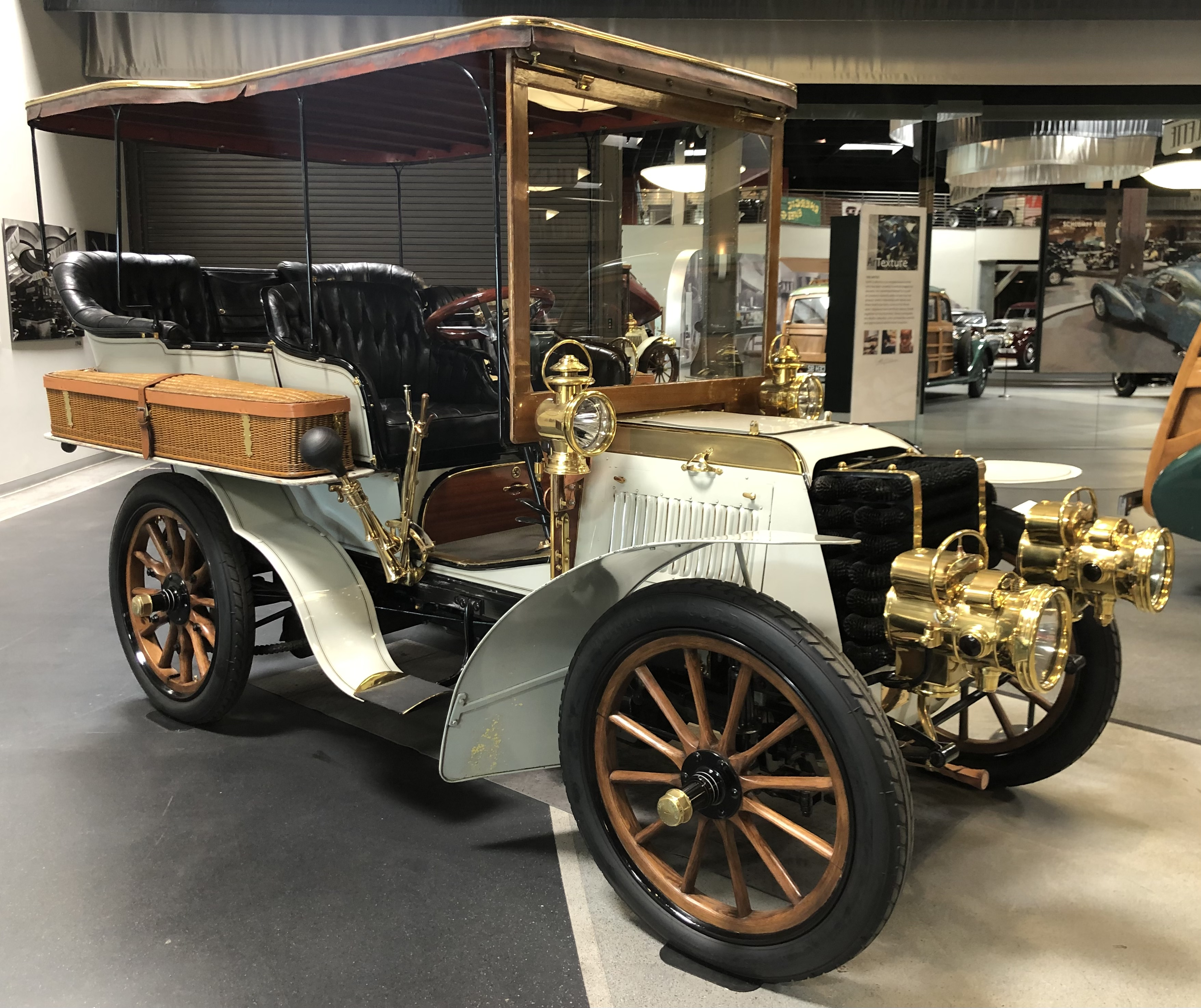
1902 Panhard & Levassor Type B1 Rear-Entrance Tonneau

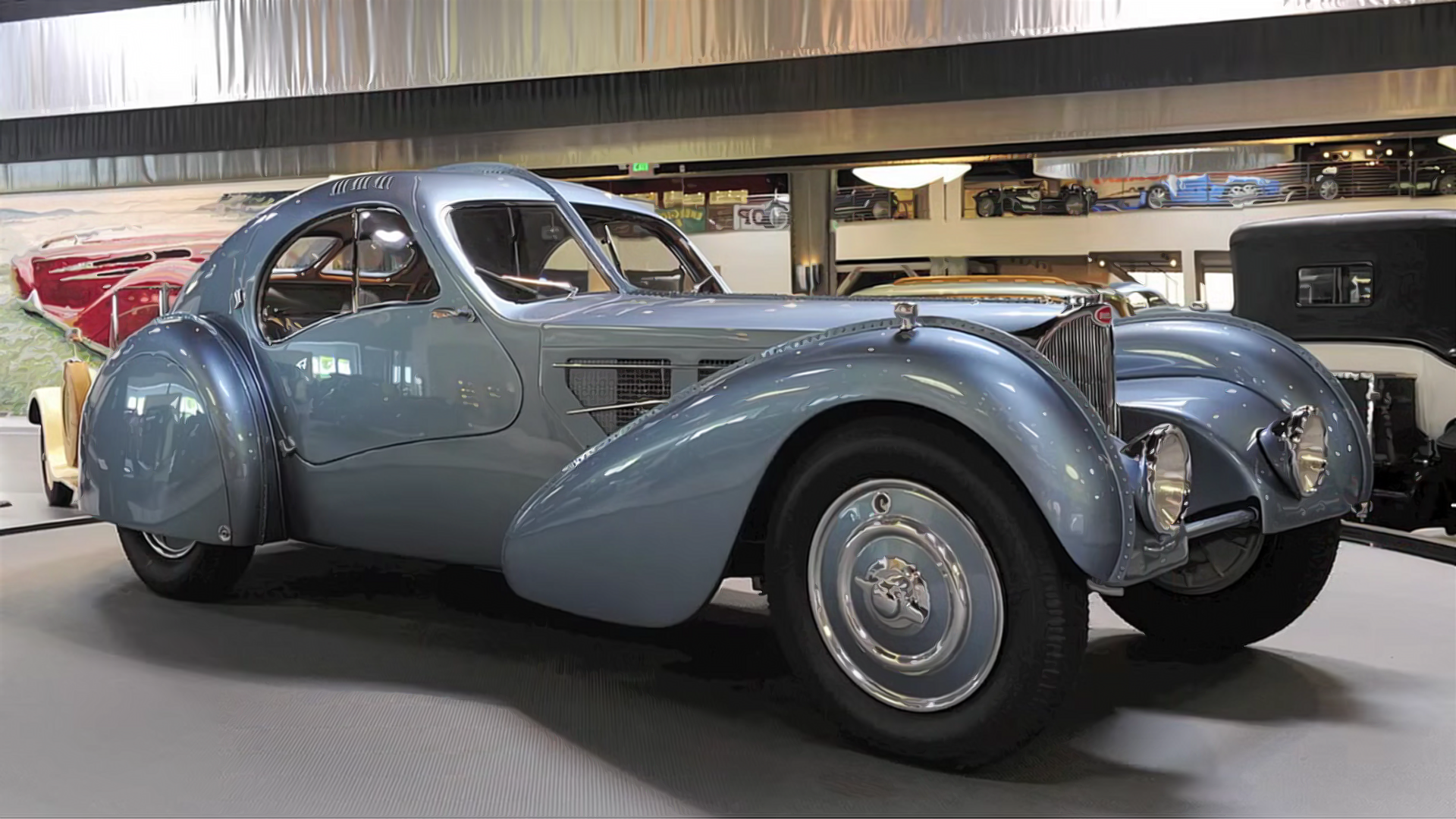
Bugatti Type 57 Atlantic

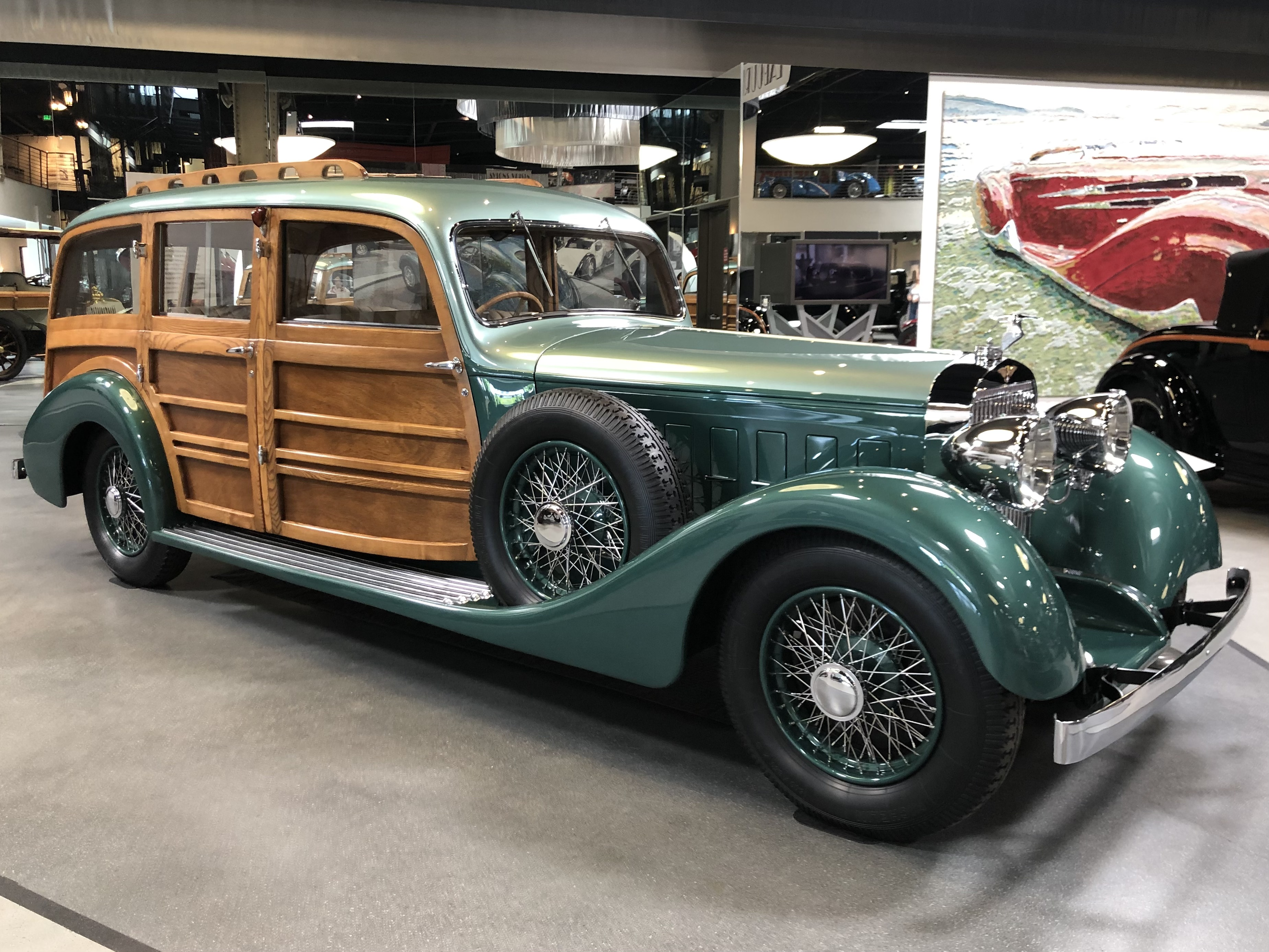
1937 Hispano-Suiza Type K6 Break de Chasse

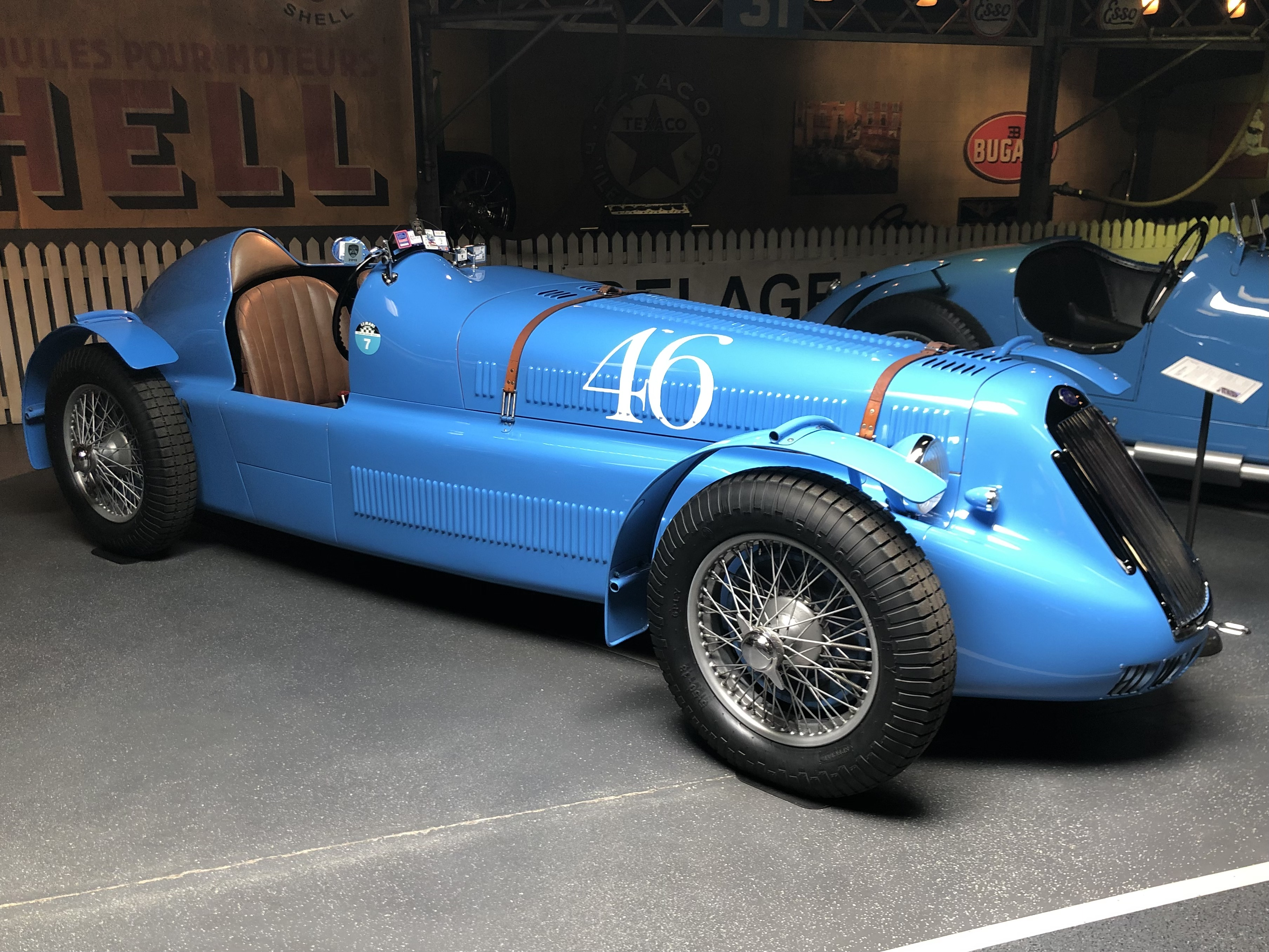
1946 Delage D6-3L Grand Prix

== See also ==
- List of automobile museums
