= M Financial Group =

American life insurance company

- Type: Private
- Founded: 1978
- Founder: Peter W. Mullin; Mark Solomon; Carl Mammel; Eli Morgan
- Headquarters: Portland, Oregon, United States
- Key people: Russell Bundschuh (Chief Executive Officer & President)
- Products: Life insurance [Investments]
- Website: www.mfin.com

The M Financial Group is a life insurance company based in Portland, Oregon, US. It offers life insurance and other financial services to "the ultra-affluent and corporate markets."

== History ==
The company was co-founded by Peter W. Mullin, Mark Solomon, Carl Mammel, and Eli Morgan in 1978.

Over the years, the M Financial Group partnered with many insurance companies. Five years after its creation, in 1983, it partnered with Pacific Life. Three years later, in 1986, it partnered with Unum. By 1987, it had also partnered with Prudential Financial. Five years later, in 1992, it partnered with John Hancock Financial. By 2006, it had partnered with the Nationwide Mutual Insurance Company. In 2011, it partnered with TIAA–CREF.

By 2008, its annual sales had grown by 75%, up to US$2 billion.

In 2014, the company established the M Center of Excellence at The American College of Financial Services, in partnership with the USC Davis School of Gerontology.

Its chief executive officer and president is Russell Bundschuh.

In 2019, M Financial Group partnered with PNC Financial Services Group in providing insurance products and services.

In 2023, M Financial opened an additional office in Dallas, Texas, while maintaining its Portland headquarters.
