= Sigrid Burton =

American painter

- Born: 1951 (age 74–75); Pasadena, California, US
- Education: Columbia University, Bennington College and University of California, Berkeley
- Known for: Painting
- Awards: Fulbright Scholar, Rockefeller Foundation Arts Residency
- Website: sigridburton.com

Sigrid Burton, Asterisms, oil on canvas, 48" x 60", 2019.

Sigrid Burton is an American visual artist, known for semi-abstract paintings that combine atmospheric color fields and allusions to nature and culture. Her work bears a wide range of influences, including Buddhist cave and Indian miniature paintings, Jain cosmological diagrams, and artists from the Renaissance to modernists such as Kandinsky, Klee and the Color field painters to the California Light and Space movement. Critics have noted the predominance of color over form in her work, sometimes describing her approach as "chromatic expressionism."

Burton has had exhibitions at venues including Artists Space, A.I.R. Gallery, the American Academy of Arts and Letters, John and Mable Ringling Museum of Art, Carnegie Art Museum, Oxnard, and the Michael C. Rockefeller Arts Center. Her work belongs to the public collections of the Metropolitan Museum of Art, Rockefeller Foundation and Palm Springs Desert Museum, among others. After being based in New York City, Burton has lived and worked in Pasadena, California since 2013.

== Life and career ==
Burton was born in Pasadena, California to Gene and Betye (Monell) Burton, who were both art patrons. She attended Westridge School for Girls (1963–9), where she participated in Allan Kaprow's Fluids (1967) and studied with performance artist Barbara T. Smith, assisting on her well-known performance, Ritual Meal (1969). After enrolling at University of California, Berkeley, Burton completed a BA degree (1973) at Bennington College in Vermont, studying with Pat Adams, Carol Haerer and Sidney Tillim.

After graduating, she moved to New York City to work as a studio assistant to painter Helen Frankenthaler, and subsequently, Jules Olitski; she assisted Frankenthaler on the painted-tile series Thanksgiving Day (1973), exhibited at the Guggenheim Museum. In her first two decades, Burton had solo exhibitions at Artists Space (1976) and Salander O'Reilly (1980) in New York, Martha White (Louisville, 1982–4), Ivory Kimpton (San Francisco, 1984–7), Patricia Hamilton Gallery (New York and Santa Monica, 1986–90) and Hokin Kaufman (Chicago, 1987–90), among others. In 1994, she was awarded an Indo-American Senior Research Fellowship from the Fulbright Program to study the meaning and use of color in traditional Indian art and ritual forms. She followed with postgraduate work in South Asian studies at Columbia University in New York City (1996–9).

In addition to her art career, Burton has taught for and served on the board of directors of LEAP (Learning through an Expanded Arts Program) in the New York City school system, volunteered and wrote a manual for AIDS service organizations, and served on the Manhattan Community Board 2 and board of trustees for the Westridge School.

== Work ==
While largely abstract, Burton's work has consistently referenced natural phenomena such as light and landscape, while drawing upon influences from Western painting and Indian art, as well as travel. Color has been a foundation of her approach, with Kandinsky's conception of the transcendent power of abstract art being an early influence, later augmented by studies of Indian aesthetic theories. Writers have also related her work to such artists as J. M. W. Turner, Odilon Redon, Pierre Bonnard and Mark Rothko. She draws literally and figuratively from the natural world of botanical, biological and weather phenomena, the structures of macro and micro cosmologies, and systems such as writing. William C. Agee wrote, "these references reveal themselves slowly, giving her art a sense of duration, a sense of a long journey through space, time, and memory" as if "moving between worlds, cultures, and centuries" or states of creation and dissolution.

Sigrid Burton, Notes From an Italian Journal (for Gene and Betye), oil on canvas, 60" x 160" (diptych), 1985–6.

=== Early Painting (1973–1995) ===
Burton's acrylic paintings of the early 1970s were characterized by broad swaths and pools of abstract color, which were indebted to Color field painting and traditions tracing back to Matisse, Impressionism and Titian. Later in the decade, she looked to artists such as Lois Lane and Terry Winters, who merged abstraction with direct or referential imagery. This resulted in three significant shifts: to oil paint, for its greater textural and chromatic qualities; to working upright with brushes and stretched canvasses for greater control (rather than pouring paint on canvases on the floor); and to drawing that broadly referenced recognizable, more personal content. Critics such as the Chicago Tribune's Alan Artner noted the new work for its lyricism, varied color evoking California settings, and for linear, gestural elements and passages of thick paint, which departed from prior color-field influences such as Helen Frankenthaler.

After an art residency at the Bellagio Study Center in Italy in 1985, Burton began experimenting with painted borders and frames within the picture plane, as well as with abstracted biomorphic elements, color, and light derived from observed nature and landscape studies. These new oils employed increased figuration, vigorous brushwork, high-key palettes and multi-colored borders that conveyed a sense of ambiguity and unreality. Arts Magazine critic Tony Towle likened their richness to pastels, describing works like the diptych Notes from an Italian Journal (for Gene and Betye) (1985–6) as "mysteriously semi-abstract [and] tranquil, dreamlike landscapes that felt primeval yet lacked menace.” Burton worked in this semi-abstract fashion into the 1990s, often alluding to sites and objects from her travels.

Sigrid Burton, The Waters of March, oil on canvas, 48" x 72", 1999.

=== Mature Painting (1995– ) ===
After an extended stay in India in 1995, Burton responded to a period of personal loss and the AIDS crisis with darker, brooding works. These paintings (e.g., The Waters of March, 1999) were more rooted to everyday experience and memory, with natural and multicultural allusions that appeared and dispersed amid hazy, color-saturated surfaces frequently in red and deep crimson hues. They often employed implicit grids and loosely constructed, imagined or canonical Indian color systems as a starting point—an approach critics described as intentional yet ambiguous, with a "calculated inexactitude" that obscured distinctions between figure and ground, plant and animal. Peter Frank observed, "form asserts itself in the midst of her luminous, translucent clouds of color, giving unanticipated backbone to otherwise invertebrate masses of hue and tone"; William Agee compared the fusion of pictorial contrasts—expansive atmospheric spaces, passages of drawing and quotidian allusions—to that of Matisse.

Sigrid Burton, Relative Position, mixed media on paper, 19" x 13", 2013.

In 2001, Merck & Company commissioned Burton to create a suite of site-specific paintings for the concourse of its global headquarters in Whitehouse Station, New Jersey; it was her first permanent environment of works in direct dialogue with one another. Throughout the 2000s, Burton continued to work in modulated monochrome fields with sparse organic forms, blurring the line between image and pure abstraction. In a 2005 review, Peter Frank wrote, Burton's "canvasses enfold the eye in baths of light and color," depicting "some half-remembered, half-imagined experience, a dream so aqueous, it might have been dreamt in the womb.”

In the 2010s, Burton's paintings were increasingly informed by her own astronomical observations at observatories in Pasadena and Chile, alongside longstanding natural, calligraphic, Hindu and Jain motifs. These paintings were more abstract than previous work, with greater depth of field and dense layering; reviews noted an acrobatic visual play between mysterious color fields and loose, unfettered marks, which suggested responses to natural phenomena and personal experience rather than representations (e.g., Asterisms and Storm Heart, both 2019). In a 2020 exhibition (Tufenkian Gallery) review, critic and curator Michael Duncan described Burton as part of a neglected underground of colorists using "color as a vehicle to the ineffable" and exploring "paint's ideal potential in an unapologetic pursuit of the sublime,"

=== Works on paper ===
While best known for painting, Burton has created mixed-media pencil, pastel, oil stick and collage works on paper throughout her career, which recall Kurt Schwitters and Paul Klee. In her later works on paper, such as Maroc (2013–6), she repurposed old drawings and accumulated ephemera from travels and the scrapbooks of her grandparents, collaging intentionally but cryptically biographical or autobiographical material. These later drawings explored a deeper sense of space and figure-ground ambiguity that crossed over to her paintings.

== Collections and awards ==
Burton's work is included in corporate, private and public collections, including those of the Metropolitan Museum of Art, Rockefeller Foundation, John & Mable Ringling Museum of Art, Palm Springs Desert Museum, Mullin Automotive Museum, Bucknell University, and Lewis and Clark College, among others. She has received commissions from Merck & Company (2001), Georgetown Plaza, New York (1990), and the Glick Organization (1986). Her work has also been used for covers for the poetry books, Sex Education (by Janice Moore Fuller) and The Poetry Project, and appeared in The New York Times, Architectural Digest, Interior Design and House Beautiful.

Burton has been recognized with a Fulbright Indo-American Senior Research Fellowship (1994-1995), a Rockefeller Foundation Arts Residency at the Bellagio Study Center in Italy (1985), and a Rosenthal Family Foundation Award through the American Academy of Arts and Letters (1977). She has been a visiting artist at Delhi College of Art, the Chautauqua Institution, and Virginia Tech. In 2019, Westridge School recognized her with its Mary Lowther Ranney Distinguished Alumna Award.
