= Peter W. Mullin =

American businessman (1941–2023)

- Born: January 14, 1941; South Pasadena, California, U.S.
- Died: September 18, 2023 (aged 82); Los Angeles, California, U.S.
- Education: University of California, Santa Barbara
- Occupations: Businessman, philanthropist
- Spouse: Merle Mullin
- Parent(s): William and Jeannette Mullin

Peter William Mullin (January 14, 1941 – September 18, 2023) was an American businessman and philanthropist. He was the founder of the M Financial Group and chairman of its subsidiary, M Financial Holdings. Additionally, he served as the chairman of Mullin Barens Sanford Financial. He was the founder and patron of the Mullin Automotive Museum in Oxnard, California.

== Early life ==
Peter William Mullin was born in South Pasadena, California, near Los Angeles, California. He graduated with a bachelor of arts degree in Economics from the University of California, Santa Barbara.

== Career ==
Mullin founded Mullin Consulting in Downtown Los Angeles in 1969. He served as its chief executive officer until 2003 and as its chairman until 2006.

Mullin co-founded the M Financial Group with Mark Solomon, Carl Mammel, and Eli Morgan in 1978. He served as the chairman of its subsidiary, M Financial Holdings. Headquartered in Portland, Oregon, it offers life insurance and other financial services to "the ultra-affluent and corporate markets."

Additionally, Mullin served as the chairman of Mullin Barens Sanford Financial, an executive compensation firm.

Mullin served on the board of directors of Avery Dennison from 1998 to 2013. He served on the Advisory Board of Main Management.

Mullin was a member of the Los Angeles Business Advisors, a group of 24 businessmen who opposed Mayor Richard Riordan's policy of creating "neighbourhood councils" in Downtown Los Angeles in 1998.

== Philanthropy ==
An avid car collector, Mullin established the Mullin Automotive Museum in Oxnard, California, in 2010. Additionally, he served as the president of the American Bugatti Club. He was also a member of the Bugatti Trust. He served on the Advisory Boards of the Autry National Center and the Guggenheim Foundation. He served on the board of trustees of the Good Samaritan Hospital, a hospital affiliated with the University of Southern California. He also served as the chairman of the Music Center Foundation, the fundraising arm of the Los Angeles Music Center.

Mullin supported colleges and universities. He formerly served as the chair of the board of trustees of Occidental College. He also served on the board of trustees of the California Institute of Technology. He has served on the board of visitors of the UCLA Anderson School of Management since 1990. He pledged a US$5 million donation to Anderson in 1999. As a result, the Mullin Management Commons at UCLA was named in his honor. Moreover, Mullin has served on the board of trustees of the Art Center College of Design in Pasadena since 2011. With his wife, he donated US$15 million to the Art Center in 2013.

Mullin supported Roman Catholic charities. He served on the board of Paulist Productions. Additionally, he served on the board of trustees of the Saint John's Health Center, a Roman Catholic hospital in Santa Monica, California, where the Mullin Plaza and the Mullin Gardens were named in his honor in 2013. With his wife and The Angell Foundation, he has also supported a program of Roman Catholic scholars at the Institute for Advanced Catholic Studies of the USC Dornsife College for Letters, Arts and Sciences.

Mullin was a Knight of Malta and a Knight of Saint Gregory.

In 2018, Mullin attempted to open a classic car museum in England, situated at Enstone Airfield, West Oxfordshire. Plans for the museum were approved by the District Council in 2019, although in 2022 Mullin submitted altered plans, which are still awaiting approval.

== Personal life and death ==
Mullin and his wife Merle resided in Brentwood, a suburb on the West side of Los Angeles. They had six children between them. They owned property in Umbria, Italy, where they made "olive oil, wine, honey, and raised Cinta Senese pigs for prosciutto."

Mullin was inducted into the Confrérie des Chevaliers du Tastevin in 1990.

Mullin won Best of Show at the Pebble Beach Concours d'Elegance in 2011.

Peter W. Mullin died in Big Sur on September 18, 2023, at the age of 82.
