= Real de Asientos =

- locality
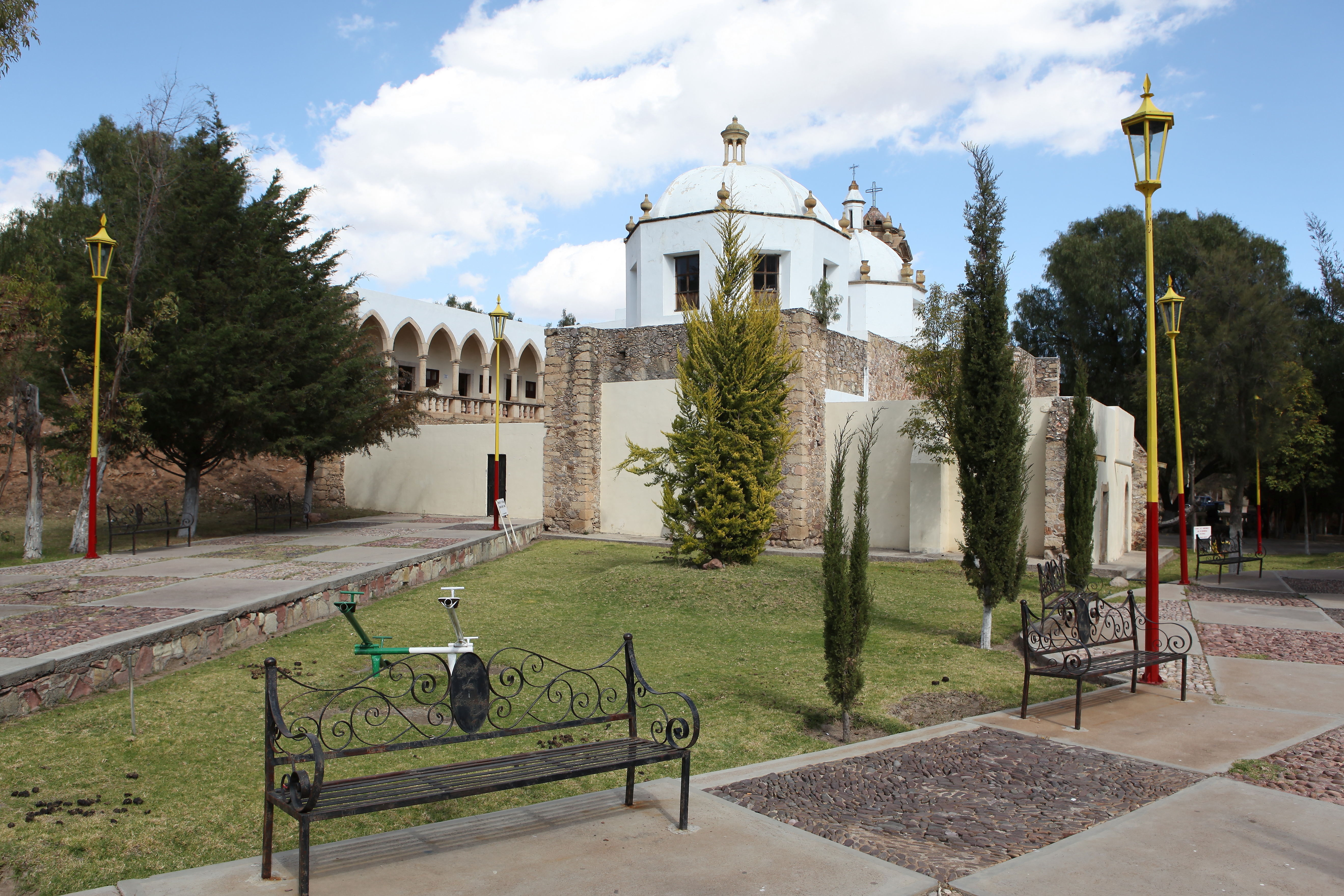

- Location within Aguascalientes Location within Mexico
- Coordinates: 21°49′25″N 102°11′15″W
- Country: Mexico
- State: Aguascalientes
- Municipality: Asientos

Government
  - Federal electoral district: Aguascalientes's 1st

Population (2010)
  - Total: 4,481
- Time zone: UTC−6 (Central)

Real de Asientos, known among its inhabitants as Villa de Asientos, is a locale in the Mexican state of Aguascalientes. It is located 11 miles north of the city of Aguascalientes and has a population of 4,481.

It serves as the municipal seat of the surrounding municipality of Asientos.

Real de Asientos was declared a Pueblo Mágico by the federal Secretariat of Tourism (SECTUR) in 2006.
