= Benjamin Brown (artist) =

American painter (1865–1942)

Benjamin Chambers Brown
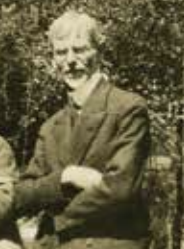
- Benjamin Chambers Brown in 1917
- Born: July 14, 1865; Marion, Arkansas
- Died: January 19, 1942 (aged 76); Pasadena, California
- Occupation: Impressionist painter
- Relatives: Howell Chambers Brown (brother)

Benjamin Chambers Brown (July 14, 1865 – January 19, 1942) was a well-known California Impressionist landscape artist. His most notable mediums were oil, lithography and etching.

== Early life and education ==
Benjamin Chambers Brown was an artist born in Marion, Arkansas to Judge Benjamin Chambers Brown and Mary Broker Brown. He was one of their five children. He grew up in Little Rock, Arkansas. One of his earliest surviving works is a collection of angels painted on the reredos of the 1884 altar at Trinity Episcopal Cathedral in Little Rock. His parents wanted him to become a lawyer. Brown was trained as a photographer instead. He studied at the University of Tennessee, and later at the St. Louis School of Fine Arts under Paul E. Harney and John Hemming Fry in 1884. He studied in Paris at the Académie Julian under Jean-Paul Laurens and Jean-Joseph Benjamin-Constant in 1890.

== Career ==
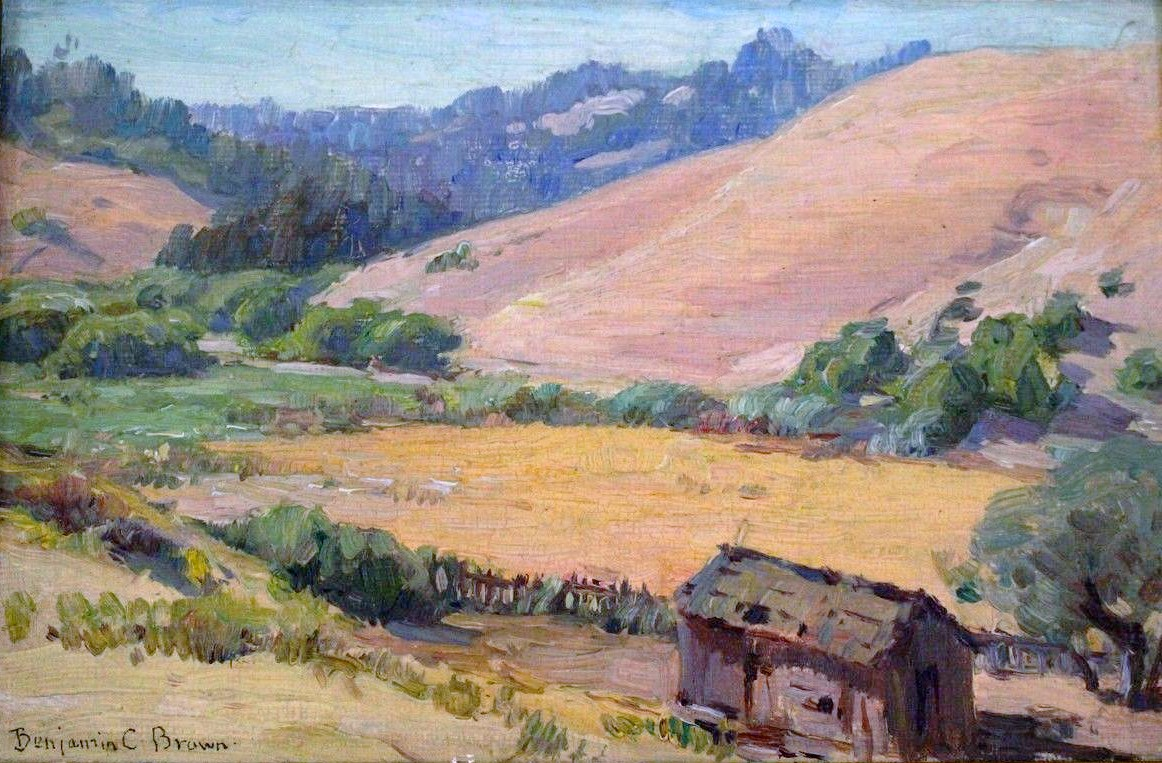
Hills on the Russian River

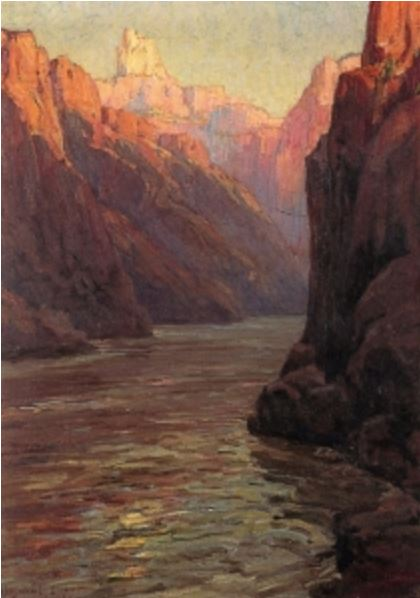
Grand Canyon

During his early career, Brown traveled and worked in St. Louis, Little Rock and Texas. In St. Louis, Brown taught at his own alma mater, the St. Louis School of Fine Arts, then went on to open his own school in Little Rock. He initially specialized in portraiture and still life. Upon moving to Pasadena in 1896, he began to paint landscapes. John Bentz gave him his first show in Pasadena at the Hotel Green, although He didn't sell any artwork until about 1900, but by 1905 he had become famous for his paintings of poppies. From 1909 to 1910, Brown had a studio in Mill Valley, California. He frequently held exhibitions in northern California and areas around San Francisco.

His first etchings were done in 1914. He co-founded the Print Makers of Los Angeles with his brother Howell Chambers Brown in 1914, which later became the Los Angeles Society of Printmakers. His notable works include his impressionist landscapes of Sierra peaks and field poppies. Due to the high demand for his works, he sent out lantern slides instead of paintings.

Brown tried to sell his artwork in New York City; however, it did not sell as well as it had in California. Instead of opening a studio in the city, he began to sign California under his own signature to show how proud he was to be a Californian, in spite of potential stigmas.

Brown was a member of the Pasadena Society of Artists, the California Art Club, the Chicago Society of Etchers, the American Federation of the Arts, and the Laguna Beach Art Association. He showed at the Del Monte Art Gallery before 1914. He also had solo exhibitions at the Los Angeles County Museum of Art in 1915, 1917, and 1918. He showed a group exhibition there in 1929. His work also appeared at the Oakland Art Gallery in 1932. His work was also part of the painting event in the art competition at the 1932 Summer Olympics.

=== Awards ===
Brown received many awards, including the bronze medal from the Portland Expo in 1905. He won a bronze medal in etching at the Panama Pacific International Exposition in San Diego in 1915, where he never won silver and gold medals as well.

== Later life and legacy ==
By 1925, Brown's health was declining. Therefore, the amount of art he could continue to produce declined. In 1929, he had an abscessed tooth and lost a lot of weight because it was too painful to eat. This ailment impeded his painting. Although his health did improve in the 1930s, He served as the president of the California Society of Printmakes until 1929. Brown died of pneumonia on January 19, 1942, in Pasadena.

Brown's works are held by the Smithsonian Institution, the Library of Congress, Oakland Museum of California, the Los Angeles, California Municipal Art Collection, the Montclair, New Jersey Museum, the Cleveland, Ohio Museum, the Boise, Idaho Public Library, and other public libraries throughout the country. He is remembered as one of the first artists to paint in Pasadena.
