= Howell Chambers Brown =

- Born: July 28, 1880; Little Rock, Arkansas, US
- Died: April 15, 1954 (aged 73); Pasadena, California, US
- Education: Stanford University
- Relatives: Benjamin Chambers Brown (brother)

Howell Chambers Brown (1880–1954) American artist and printmaker, known for engraving and etching. His work was often focused on the genre of the American West.

== Biography ==
Howell Chambers Brown was born July 28, 1880, in Little Rock, Arkansas, and at age 16 his family moved to Pasadena, California. His parents were Judge Benjamin Chambers Brown and Mary Broker Brown, and he was one of their five children. His brother was Benjamin Chambers Brown.

Brown initially attended the Stanford University School of Engineering, eventually he left the engineering department and earned an A.B. degree from Stanford University in May 1904 in Romance Languages. He lived on a ranch in Sinaloa, Mexico for a period of time. In 1914, Brown and his brother Benjamin Brown co-founded the Printmakers of Los Angeles (1914), which later became the Los Angeles Society of Printmakers.

Brown died April 15, 1954, in Pasadena, California.

His work is in various public collections including Fine Arts Museums of San Francisco (FAMSF), Smithsonian American Art Museum, Modern Art Museum of Fort Worth, Mills College Art Museum, among others.
