= Florence Arnold =

American painter

Florence Arnold was an American hard-edge abstract painter from North Orange County, California. She had become active in Fullerton's art community by establishing organizations and showcases to promote interest in art in youth. She has had works installed in California and internationally.

== Background ==
Florence (“Flossie”) Maud Arnold (née Millner) was born on September 6, 1900, in Prescott, Arizona Territory. She earned a Bachelor of Art in music in 1926 at Mills College in Oakland, CA and a Bachelor's in education in 1939 at the University of Southern California in Los Angeles, CA. She subsequently earned a music teaching credential in 1937 from Claremont College. After getting married, she had settled in Fullerton, California. She taught at Fullerton Union High School. Arnold taught music for 42 years.

She has had her work exhibited at the Muckenthaler Cultural Center in Fullerton, Laguna Art Museum, and the Smithsonian. She was an artist in residence at Fullerton College Art Department's art gallery in 1973. She had art displayed in places outside the United States in Madrid, Copenhagen, Florence, Rome, Milan, and Venice.

== Art career ==
When she retired from music around 50 years old, she began to take painting classes at Fullerton College. She initially painted landscapes and still life, but became drawn to abstract style art. She drew inspiration from John McLaughlin's work in abstract art.

She became very active in the art community around North Orange County. It was then she would be called Flossie by her friends. She organized the Orange County Art Association. In 1966, she was one of the founders for Night in Fullerton. Another organization she helped found was the Art Alliance at California State University, Fullerton. She was a founding member of the Muckenthaler Cultural Center She founded events to promote young artists in pursuing their art careers with one reoccurring event being the Florence Young Artist Festival/Exhibition. She started the festival in 1976. This events also celebrated accomplished youth artist selected to be part of the exhibition. The Muckenthaler Cultural Center has last hosted this event in 2016.

Her art is classified as hard edge style abstraction. This phrase was coined by art critic Jules Langser in 1959 and Arnold became part of the Hard-edge painting school of art.<Fullerton: the Boom Years, pg 83> She studied and developed her technique under Karl Benjamin.

== Later life ==
She died at 93 years old in 1994. Arnold had donated some of her art to Fullerton College which remains in the art department's permanent collection. The California State University, Fullerton Art Alliance organization continues to grant scholarships in Arnold's name at for art students specializing in drawing, illustration, printing, or painting. This scholarship was established to honor her in 1990.

== Sources ==
1. Mudrick, Sylvia Palmer; Richey, Debora, and Cathy Thomas. (2015) Fullerton: the Boom Years. The History Press. ISBN 9781626193192
2. http://themuck.org/programing/2016/11/3/florence-arnold-young-artist-exhibition
3. http://lagunaartmuseum.org/florence-arnold/
4. http://libraryfchistory.fullcoll.edu/photos.php?image_id=1705
5. Pickel, Mary Lou (March 5, 1994). "Artist F.M. Arnold Dies at 93; Helped Launch 'A Night in Fullerton'." LA Times. Archived.https://www.latimes.com/archives/la-xpm-1994-03-05-me-30186-story.html
6. Angel, Sherry (September 14, 1990). "Fullerton Artist Says There's an Art to Living." LA Times. Archived. https://www.latimes.com/archives/la-xpm-1990-09-14-vw-400-story.html
7. Flocken, Corinne(March 18, 1989). "Showing Off : Works of 500 Fullerton Students Move From Refrigerator Door to Muckenthaler." LA Times. Archived. https://www.latimes.com/archives/la-xpm-1989-03-18-ca-333-story.html
