= Meg Linton =

Meg Linton is an American curator of contemporary art and writer. Her curatorial efforts have ranged from historical investigations such as "Doin’ It in Public: Feminism and Art at the Woman’s Building" (part of the Getty’s initiative Pacific Standard Time: Art in L.A. 1945-1980), "The Los Angeles School: Karl Benjamin, Lorser Feitelson, Frederick Hammersley, June Harwood, Helen Lundeberg, John McLaughlin", and "In the Land of Retinal Delights: The Juxtapoz Factor" to showcasing the work of single artists who are stylistically different such as "Alison Saar: STILL. . .", "Robert Williams: Through Prehensile Eye," and "Joan Tanner: On Tenderhook" to group exhibitions such as "Mexicali Biennial 2010," "Do It Now: Live Green!" and "Tapping the Third Realm."

== Education ==
Linton received a B.A. in English from the University of California, Irvine in 1989, and a M.F.A. in Exhibition design from California State University, Fullerton in 1995.

== Career ==
Starting in 1999, Linton was the executive director of the Santa Barbara Contemporary Arts Forum for five years and has held many other curatorial and teaching positions in California and New York City. She was the curator and the "Director of Galleries and Exhibitions" at the Ben Maltz Gallery at Otis College of Art and Design in Los Angeles from September 2003 to May 2014. She served as head of Santa Fe’s Center for Contemporary Arts in 2016.

Linton was a co-founder and curator of the Griffin Linton Contemporary Exhibitions in Venice Beach and Costa Mesa, California. She has served on the executive committee for the Southern California Chapter of Art Table and was a board member of the LAX Coastal Area Chamber of Commerce.
