= Four Abstract Classicists =

1959 art exhibition

Four Abstract Classicists was a landmark exhibition organized by Jules Langsner in 1959. The show featured the work of Karl Benjamin, Lorser Feitelson, Frederick Hammersley, and John McLaughlin. The term “abstract classicists” was coined in 1959 by Langsner to define these four southern California painters.

== Exhibition ==
The exhibition opened at the San Francisco Museum of Art (now the San Francisco Museum of Modern Art), and then travelled to the Los Angeles County Museum of Art in Exposition Park (prior to LACMA's existence as an independent art museum). Renamed West Coast Hard-edge, the revised version later traveled to the Institute of Contemporary Arts in London and Queen's University in Belfast, Northern Ireland.

In the exhibition catalog, Langsner described Abstract Classicist painting as "Hard-edge painting" in which "color and shape are one and the same entity. Form gains its existence through color and color its being through form."

"Four Abstract Classicists reveals, in retrospect, not merely four senior moderns who reduced their painting to precise, flat profundities, but a current of sensibility in the esthetic climate of Los Angeles," critic Peter Plagens wrote in 1974. As he saw it, the hard-edge style rose from Los Angeles’ "desert air, youthful cleanliness, spatial expanse, architectural tradition".

== Artists ==
- Lorser Feitelson (1898, Savannah, GA – 1978, Los Angeles, California)
- John McLaughlin (May 21, 1898 – March 22, 1976)
- Frederick Hammersley (January 5, 1919 – May 31, 2009)
- Karl Benjamin (December 29, 1925 – July 26, 2012)
