= Ruth Pastine =

American artist (born 1964)

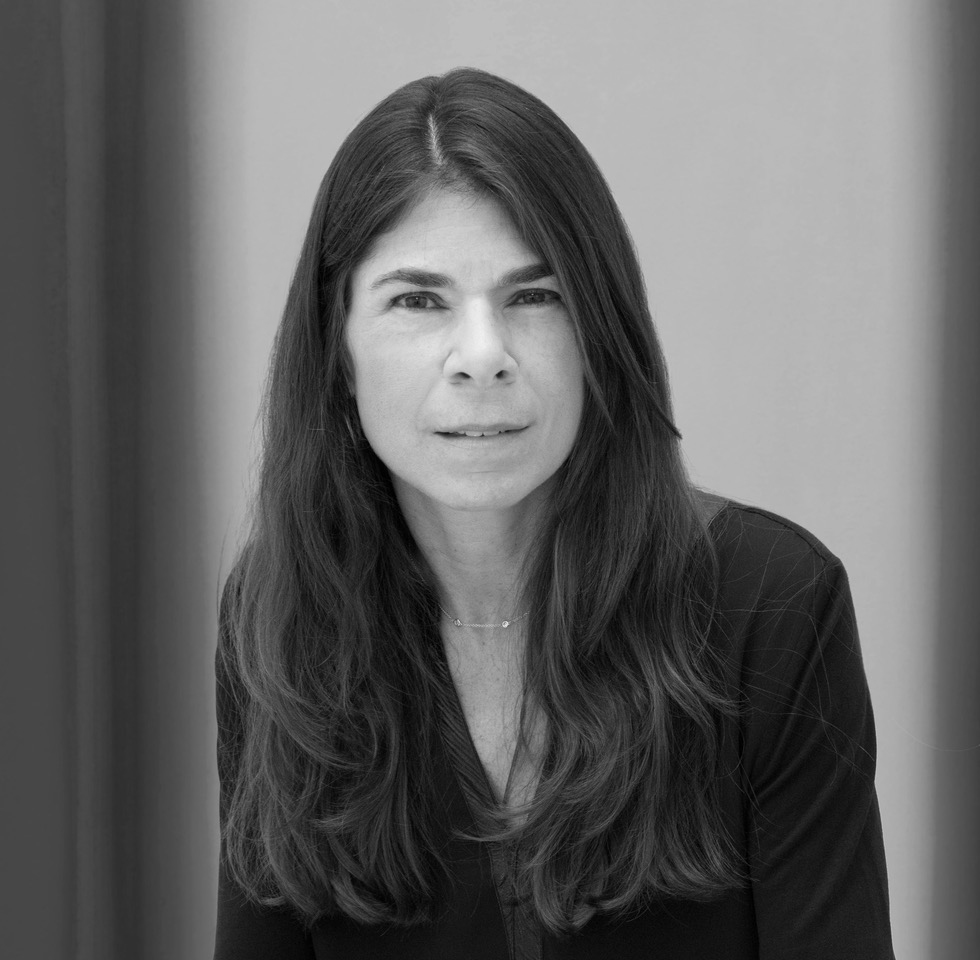
- Born: 1964 (age 61–62); New York City, New York, US
- Education: Hunter College, Cooper Union, Gerrit Rietveld Academie
- Known for: Painting, multi-panel installations, public art, works on paper
- Spouse: Gary Lang
- Awards: Elizabeth Foundation for the Arts, Shifting Foundation
- Website: Ruth Pastine

Ruth Pastine (born 1964) is an American artist known for abstract minimalist paintings that explore the phenomenological experience of color, light and space. Critics relate her art to the Southern California Light and Space movement, while identifying key differences, such as its focus on metaphysical aspects of consciousness and its reliance on basic, traditional means (brush, paint, pastels) rather than synthetic-industrial materials. In these regards, writers trace her artistic lineage to Monet and Malevich—who sought to capture light's ineffability—and to Abstract Expressionist and Color field painters such as Barnett Newman, Ad Reinhardt and Mark Rothko, who probed the chromatic and tonal nuances of oil paint. Pastine's paintings typically consist of seamless gradating bands or fields of color built in layers with countless brushstrokes, which optically coalesce and appear to pulse, float, dissolve, or glow as if backlit. Peter Frank has written that she "paints as purely optical a kind of painting as it is possible to paint … nothing but color and its presentation, with myriad, closely shifted color modulations."

Pastine has exhibited at institutions including the San Francisco Museum of Modern Art (SFMOMA), Museum of Contemporary Art San Diego (MCASD), Lancaster Museum of Art and History (MOAH) and the Carnegie Art Museum. Her work belongs to the public collections of SFMOMA, the Museum of Fine Arts Houston, The Phillips Collection, and de Young Museum, among others. She lives and works in Southern California.

== Early life and career ==
Pastine was born in New York City in 1964 and raised in the East Village, Manhattan. She developed an early interest in art, and during her attendance at the High School of Music & Art in Manhattan determined she would become an artist. After graduating, she studied art at Cooper Union—earning a BFA in 1987—and at the Gerrit Rietveld Academie in Amsterdam. She continued at Hunter College (MFA, 1993), working with Vincent Longo, Robert Morris, Robert Swain and Sanford Wurmfeld. Her focus at Hunter centered on painting, critical studies and the color perception work of 19th-century French chemist Michel Eugène Chevreul and the artist Josef Albers.

In the mid-1990s Pastine began appearing in group shows in New York and the West Coast, and gained attention for solo exhibitions at Brian Gross Fine Art (1996, 1998) and Haines Gallery (2000) in San Francisco, Deven Golden Fine Art (New York, 1998), and Quint Contemporary Art (Los Angeles, 1999). In 2001, she and her husband, artist Gary Lang, relocated to Southern California, where her work would become associated with the concerns of the Light and Space movement.

In her later career, Pastine has had solo shows at Brian Gross (2008–20), Gallery Sonja Roesch (2008–23, Houston), and Edward Cella Art + Architecture (2009–19) and Ace Gallery (2016–17) in Beverly Hills and Los Angeles, as well as survey exhibitions at MOAH ("Attraction: 1993-2013," 2014) and the Carnegie Art Museum ("Present Tense," 2015) in California, among others.

== Work and critical reception ==
Ruth Pastine, Tribute, Equivalence, "Red Green Series," oil on canvas, 48" x 48" x 2", 2004.

Pastine's art is rooted in the physical, retinal and perceptual phenomena of color and light. She works serially and systematically, methodically constructing oppositions within individual paintings and across bodies of work that challenge preconceptions about color. Her purely abstract oil paintings achieve their optical effects by juxtaposing, layering and transitioning complementary, saturated or contrasting-valued hues, engaging phenomena such as color relativity—the perception of influence between adjacent colors. Peter Frank described her approach as painterly and intuitive, an "on-site evolution" of color presences and relationships involving "optical induction, a stepwise edging of color fields towards and against but never away from one another." Donald Kuspit, among others, has noted a "dialectical" engagement with various dichotomies in Pastine's work: presence and absence, materiality and immateriality, undifferentiated and differentiated, objective reality and subjective perception.

=== Early work (1990s–2004) ===
Pastine's early paintings were small-scale, minimalist, nearly monochromatic works whose rigorous formal systems employed closely valued complementary colors that merged almost imperceptibly within the iconic square format favored by the Russian Suprematists. She painted them meticulously from the center out with a small brush, producing soft forms that seemed to glow, pulse, float or dissolve in mist-like color fields evoking infinity. Critics suggested that her "Chance Rays" series (1994–8) responded to specific moments of sunlight—for example, the image Ray Painting #3 Milestone, which Robert L. Pincus wrote, "resembled a sunset viewed through a thin veil of fog." Reviewers connected this work's engagement with both the optical and metaphysical implications of light and color to the formalist, transcendental affinities of artists such as Georgia O'Keeffe, Malevich, Rothko, Robert Irwin, Dan Flavin, Mary Corse and Agnes Martin.

With her "Yellow Magenta Series" and "Red Green Series" (1998–2004), Pastine shifted her focus away from the appearance of external influences and natural associations to the experience of light discerned through the perception of color and the optical mixing of pigments on canvases purged of natural associations. New York Times critic Ken Johnson noted the new saturated hues in the former series—"stainy, monochrome pictures [that] vary in color from candy purple to salmon orange to taxicab yellow"—which were mixed wet-into-wet to create an ambiguous sensation of "glowing from within." The "Red Green Series," meanwhile, often used subtler hues that San Francisco critic Kenneth Baker wrote, created "improbable, hypnotic sensations of color as both objective and dematerialized."

Ruth Pastine, Limitless installation, Blue Orange Series pictured, oil on canvas on beveled stretcher, 102" x 144" x 2.5" (each diptych installed); site-specific commission, adjoining north and south lobbies at Ernst & Young Plaza, Los Angeles, CA, 2009.

=== Later exhibitions & commissions ===
Pastine diversified her color and light investigations in the 2000s to include new formats, geometric forms and color combinations exploring more intense and contradictory luminosities and temperatures. She began with several series between 2004 and 2009 that employed larger vertical and horizontal (rather than square) canvases, including the "Sameness & Difference," "Convergence," "Black Light" and "Limitless" works. The change in format shifted her work away from symmetry and toward compositions that were more architectural and less serene in terms of balance, rhythmic oscillation and emotion.

In the latter three bodies of work, she used subtle, concentric or banded gradations of primary and complementary hues to create a wide range of nuanced color experiences—convergence, reconciliation, temporality and immateriality, suggestions of passion or control—that were furthered by changing light conditions. Donald Kuspit wrote of this work, "at its best, as in Pastine's pure paintings, abstraction remains what it fundamentally is: a risky attempt to evoke numinous feeling, thus sustaining the sense of the sacred in a secular world." The Limitless series included Pastine's first commissioned work—a permanent painting installation at Ernst & Young Plaza in downtown Los Angeles. It consists of two sets of four large vertical paintings (from her "Blue Orange Series" and "Red Green Series", respectively) arranged as four diptychs, which visually linked the building's two immense adjoining lobbies. The painting surfaces appear to dematerialize in context with one another, evoking a visceral, inherent tension; that quality is accentuated by custom-designed, deeply beveled stretchers that cause the paintings to appear to float or glow, an effect Pastine would continue to use in her work.

Ruth Pastine, Inevitability of Truth 6 (Blue Orange) for Malevich, Inevitability of Truth Series, oil on canvas on beveled stretcher, 60" x 60" x 2.5", 2015.

In later series, ("Mind’s Eye: Sense Certainty," 2014; "The Inevitability of Truth," 2015; "Witness," 2017), Pastine mined new color possibilities by shifting from monochromatic, largely primary colors to supersaturated hues that David. M. Roth wrote, suggested "what Mark Rothko might have created had he adopted a Caribbean palette." These works generally consisted of top-to-bottom bands of color ranging from orange flanked by purple, pink and fuchsia to aquas, blues and pinks, bounded by narrower bands of similar tints that shifted across the spectrum, sometimes subtly and sometimes boldly. The paintings courted optical banding at the color-shift areas—an effect Pastine discovered while confronting the limitations of working with pastels—that represented compressed versions of her earlier expanded color field transitions. Reviewers sometimes likened these color modulations to musical notes that sounded and were quickly subsumed into orchestral wholes. Shana Nys Dambrot wrote, "although the paintings are not actually electric or kinetic, in seeing them one has the distinct sensation of colors breathing, deepening, shifting, and vibrating, changing even as you look right at them, emanating activated auras." These later series also included larger works built around central diamond shapes that were surrounded by concentric bands of intense color (e.g., Matter of Light 2-S4848, 2016).

In 2020, Pastine's exhibition, "Spectrum Depths" (Gallery Sonja Roesch), featured intimate, eye-popping works painted on paper in response to the early months of the COVID-19 pandemic. Their heightened visual intensity conveyed both a sense of global urgency and a luminosity suggesting hopefulness. (e.g., Yellow 7, 2020).

== Recognition ==
Pastine's work belongs to the public collections of the de Young Museum (Achenbach Foundation for Graphic Arts), Frederick R. Weisman Art Foundation, Lancaster Museum of Art and History, Museum of Contemporary Art San Diego, Museum of Fine Arts Houston, The Phillips Collection, and San Francisco Museum of Modern Art, among others. She has received grants from the Elizabeth Foundation for the Arts (1999) and Shifting Foundation (2000), and a residency from the Carolyn Glasoe Bailey Foundation (2018).

Pastine has been commissioned to create public art projects for the Ernst & Young Plaza (Limitless, 2009) and CIM Group Headquarters (The Inevitability of Truth, 2015) in Los Angeles, and for the United Airlines Polaris lounge at the Los Angeles International Airport (2019), among others.
