= James Grant (artist) =

American artist (1924–1997)

- Born: James Edward Grant; May 25, 1924; Los Angeles, California
- Died: August 14, 1997 (aged 73); Stinson Beach, California
- Education: Jepson Art Institute
- Known for: painting, sculpture
- Movement: Abstract expressionism
- Website: https://www.jamesgrant.org/

James Edward Grant (May 25, 1924 – August 14, 1997) was an American painter and sculptor active from the late 1950s into the early 1970s. Best known for his sculptural work in plastics, this work by no means defined him but was rather a natural endpoint of an exploration into increased dimensionality—starting from abstract canvases, moving through collages and bas-reliefs until the work finally came off the wall in sculptural form.

== Life and work ==
Clear Red Acrylic, Acrylic on canvas, 1959

=== Early life and education ===
Grant was born in Los Angeles in 1924. After receiving his undergraduate degree in Engineering from the University of Southern California, he went on to pursue his M.F.A. at the Jepson Art Institute in Los Angeles, studying under Rico Lebrun. In 1950 he accepted a teaching position at Pomona College in Claremont, California where he was Assistant Professor of Art for nine years. At about this time he married Nancy Parkford. During his tenure at Pomona he worked with many influential artists and art historians, including painters Karl Benjamin and Frederick Hammersley, as well as Peter Selz (who later went on to become Chief Curator of Painting and Sculpture at the Museum of Modern Art, New York) and Seymour Slive (Director of the Fogg Art Museum, Harvard University).

=== Artistic career ===
Collage Bridge, Collage, 1959

Untitled, Cast Polyester Resin, 1966

While working in Southern California, Grant had solo exhibitions at the Pasadena Art Museum, Pomona College Museum of Art, and the University of California, Riverside, and group exhibitions at the Los Angeles County Museum of Art, the Oakland Museum of California, and the San Francisco Museum of Modern Art. After Pomona, Grant enjoyed a two-year stay in Rome where his paintings began to develop in texture—moving more towards collage work, using both paint and fabric. His stay was punctuated by a solo exhibition at the Galleria Pogliani in Rome.

Upon returning to the United States in 1962, Grant settled in San Francisco, where his collage work continued. In 1963 he had a solo exhibition at the M. H. de Young Memorial Museum. During the 1960s, he showed regularly at galleries and museums both in the Bay Area (Hansen Gallery) and New York (Bertha Schaefer Gallery and Grand Central Moderns).

In the mid 1960s, his collages began to include polyester resin which he applied in a painterly fashion to the canvas. Soon he began to cast the resin into large, textured bas-reliefs. His plastic work culminated in the development of large cast resin freestanding sculptures of geometric disks, tall spikes and subtly curved shapes which were highly polished. In 1970, he had a retrospective at Mills College in Oakland, California documenting his transition in style from abstract canvases to collages to bas-reliefs and finally the freestanding sculptures. In the 1970s, he worked on several commissioned works, many incorporating unique plastic and glass materials.

=== Later life and death ===
Untitled Target, Polyester Resin, c. 1969

After a break from art during the late 1970s, Grant returned to painting in the early 1980s at his studio in Stinson Beach, California producing small watercolors that were cut into squares and reassembled into grids. He then took this format to a large scale, painting acrylic canvases which were also cut into squares and reassembled in works ranging from four to eight feet. This work continued into the 1990s.

Grant died in Stinson Beach in August 1997. When the new Stinson Beach branch library opened in 1999, the opening show was of Grant's work. The art exhibit wall is named in his honor.

== Exhibitions ==
Bold entries denote solo exhibitions.

- 2008 de Saisset Museum, Santa Clara University, CA, Selections from the Anderson Collection: The 1960s
- 2004 Crocker Art Museum, Sacramento, CA, San Francisco and the Second Wave: The Blair Collection of Abstract Expressionism
- 1995 Triton Museum of Art, Santa Clara, CA, A Bay Area Connection: Works from the Anderson Collection
- 1972 Triangle Gallery, San Francisco
- 1971 University of Illinois, Champaign-Urbana, Contemporary American Painting and Sculpture
- 1971 Stanford Art Gallery, Palo Alto, CA, West Coast Art
- 1971 Oakland Art Museum, Oakland, CA, Pierres de Fantasie
- 1970 Mills College Art Gallery
- 1970 Berkeley Art Gallery
- 1970 Joslyn Art Museum, Omaha, NE, Looking West
- 1969 Seligman Gallery, Seattle, WA
- 1969 University of Illinois, Champaign-Urbana, Contemporary American Painting and Sculpture
- 1969 Institute of Contemporary Art, University of Pennsylvania, PA, Plastics: New Art
- 1968 Raymond College, University of the Pacific
- 1968 Museum of Contemporary Crafts, New York, Plastic as Plastic
- 1968 Hansen Gallery, San Francisco, CA, Recent Developments in Plastic
- 1968 Crocker Art Gallery, Sacramento, CA, West Coast '68, Painters and Sculptors
- 1967 Hansen Gallery, San Francisco, CA, Plastics West Coast
- 1967 University of Illinois, Champaign-Urbana, Contemporary American Painting and Sculpture
- 1966 Hansen Gallery, San Francisco
- 1966 Mead Corporation, Art Across America
- 1966 Crocker Art Gallery, Sacramento, CA, ’66 Painters and Sculptors
- 1966 San Francisco Museum of Art, San Francisco, CA, San Francisco Art Institute 85th Annual Exhibition
- 1963 M.H. de Young Memorial Museum, San Francisco
- 1963 Grand Central Moderns, New York
- 1963 Mary Washington College of the University of Virginia
- 1962 Galleria Pogliani, Rome
- 1962 Art Center in La Jolla
- 1961 Grand Central Moderns, New York
- 1960 University of Nebraska, Nebraska Art Association Annual
- 1959 Pasadena Art Museum, A Decade (1949–1959)
- 1959 Bertha Schaefer Gallery, New York
- 1958 Pomona College, Claremont, CA
- 1958 University of California at Riverside
- 1958 Humboldt State College
- 1958 San Francisco Museum of Art, San Francisco, CA, San Francisco Art Institute 77th Annual Painting and Sculpture Exhibition
- 1957 California State Fair and Exhibition
- 1956 Pasadena Art Museum
- 1956 Pomona Museum, Pomona, CA, Grant, Hammersley, Lawler
- 1955 Los Angeles County Museum
- 1954 Oakland Art Museum, Western Painters Annual Exhibition
- 1954 Los Angeles County Museum

== Public collections ==
- San Francisco Museum of Modern Art
- Oakland Museum
- Pasadena Museum
- Pomona College Museum of Art
- Claremont Museum of Art
- Mary Washington College of the University of Virginia
- Raymond College of the University of the Pacific
- City College of San Francisco

== Bibliography ==
- Landauer, Susan (2004). San Francisco and the Second Wave: The Blair Collection of Bay Area Abstract Expressionism. Crocker Art Museum. pp. 98–99.
- Beebe, Marjorie (1988). Art at Pomona: A Centennial Celebration. Trustees of Pomona College.
- DuPont, Diana (1985). San Francisco Museum of Modern Art: Paintings and Sculpture Collection. San Francisco Museum of Modern Art.
- Albright, Thomas (1985). Art in the San Francisco Bay Area 1945-1980: An Illustrated History. University of California Press. p. 280.
- Orr-Cahall, Christina (1984). The Art of California: Selected Works from the Collection of the Oakland Museum. Oakland Museum. p. 191.
- Opitz, Glenn B. (1983). Dictionary of American Sculptors. Apollo.
- Boyd, Margy (1975). The First Artists' Soap Box Derby. San Francisco Museum of Art.
- Busch, Julia (1974). A Decade of Sculpture: The New Media in the 1960s. The Art Alliance Press. pp. 25, plates XII-XIV.
- Butler, LeRoy (1970). Looking West 1970. Joslyn Art Museum. pp. 8, 80.

== See also ==
- Abstract expressionism
