= James Little (painter) =

American painter (born 1952)

- Born: 1952 (age 73–74); Memphis, Tennessee, U.S.
- Education: Memphis Academy of Art (BFA 1974), Syracuse University (MFA 1976)
- Occupations: Painter, curator
- Known for: Geometric abstraction

James Little (born 1952) is an American painter and curator. He is known for his works of geometric abstraction that are often imbued with exuberant color. He has been based in New York City.

== Early life and education ==
Little was born in 1952 in Memphis, Tennessee, and grew up in the segregated American South. He is from an African-American family.

He studied at the Memphis Academy of Art (now known as Memphis College of Art). While a student his work was praised and selected in 1973 for an exhibition at the Arkansas Arts Center by Gerald Nordland. He received his BFA degree from Memphis Academy of Art in 1974. In 1976, Little obtained his MFA degree from Syracuse University in Syracuse, New York.

== Career ==
Little cites Joan Mitchell along with Barnett Newman, Mark Rothko, Franz Kline, Alma Thomas, and George L. K. Morris as among the artists whose work he most admires. He has said of his own modus operandi: "Abstraction provided me with self-determination and free will. It was liberating. I don't find freedom in any other form. People like to have an answer before they have the experience. Abstraction doesn't offer you that." Critic Karen Wilkin has called Little's work (as possessing of a) "ravishing physicality" and . . . "orchestrations of geometry and chroma to delight our eyes and stir our emotions and intellect...". Although Little has oft been labeled a hard-edge influenced painter, he himself has said otherwise.

In 1976, his work was the subject of the solo exhibition Paintings by James Little curated by Ronald Kutcha at the Everson Museum in Syracuse. In 1980, Little's work was included in the exhibition "Afro-American Abstraction", curated by April Kingsley, at MoMA PS1.

In 2002, Little's large commission for the Metropolitan Transportation Authority was unveiled. Riders at Jamaica Station now travel through his 85-foot-long environment made of 33 multicolored laminated glass panels in a prismatic design, each measuring at 17-feet tall by 5-feet wide.

In 2020, some of Little's large-scale black-tone paintings were shown in a two-artist exhibition with the work of Louise Nevelson, who was represented exclusively by the black colored sculptures, for which she is most known. The exhibition titled Louise Nevelson + James Little ran from September 3, 2020 until October 28, 2020 at Rosenbaum Contemporary in Boca Raton, Florida.

Little's work was included in the 2022 Whitney Biennial.

Little currently teaches at the Art Students League of New York. He was formerly represented by the June Kelly Gallery in Manhattan and is now represented by Petzel in New York City, Louis Stern Fine Arts in West Hollywood, and the Kavi Gupta Gallery in Chicago, where his work was the subject of a solo exhibition in November 2022.

His work is the subject of the 2005 paperback publication James Little: Reaching for the Sky, which features 13 color reproductions of his pieces and essays by Robert C. Morgan, George N'Namdi, Alvin Loving, Robert Costa, Horace Brockington, and James Haritas.

== Awards ==
In 2009, Little won a Joan Mitchell Foundation award. He has also been the recipient of a Pollock-Krasner Foundation grant.

== Curation ==
In 2019, Little curated the New York Centric exhibition at the American Fine Arts Society gallery, which included the work of multiple generations of abstract artists associated with New York City, among them Alma Thomas, Alvin Loving, Larry Poons, Stanley Boxer, Peter Reginato, Dan Christensen, Ronnie Landfield, Gabriele Evertz, Charles Hinman, Thornton Willis, Doug Ohlson, Robert Swain, and Ed Clark.

== Solo exhibitions ==
- 2021: Chromatic Rhythm - James Little: Paintings on Paper, Sarah Moody Gallery of Art, University of Alabama, Tuscaloosa, Alabama and Ewing Gallery of Art + Architecture, University of Tennessee, Knoxville, Tennessee
- 2020: James Little: Dots and Slants, Louis Stern Fine Arts, West Hollywood, CA
- 2018: Slants and White Paintings, June Kelly Gallery, New York
- 2016: Informed by Rhythm: Recent Work by James Little, Louis Stern Fine Arts, West Hollywood, CA
- 2015: "Color/Barriers: Recent Work", essay by James Harithas, June Kelly Gallery, New York
- 2013: "Never Say Never", essay by Karen Wilkin, June Kelly Gallery, New York
- 2011: "Ex Pluribus Unum: New Paintings", essay by Mario Naves, June Kelly Gallery, New York
- 2009: "De-Classified, Recent Paintings", essay by James Harithas, June Kelly Gallery, New York
- 2007: James Little: Untold Stories, Station Museum of Contemporary Art, Houston, TX
- 2005: "Reaching for the Sky, essays by Robert Costas, James Harithas, Al Loving, G. R.;N'Namdi Gallery, New York; catalogue
- 2003: "Beyond Geometry: New Paintings", essay by Robert C. Morgan, L.I.C.K. Ltd. Fine Art, Long Island City, NY
- 1995: Recent Abstract Paintings, Kenkeleba Gallery, New York
- 1992: James Little: Selected Works from the Past Decade, Lubin House Gallery, Syracuse University, New York
- 1990: "Tondos and Ovals", essay by April Kingsley, June Kelly Gallery, New York
- 1989: James Little: Recent Paintings, The Christian Science Church, Boston, MA
- 1988: James Little & Al Loving: New Work, June Kelly Gallery, New York
- 1987: New Paintings, Liz Harris Gallery, Boston, MA
- 1985: James Little: Format Paintings, Harris Brown Gallery, Boston, MA
- 1982: "Recent Oil Paintings", essay by April Kingsley, Alternative Museum, New York
- 1976: Paintings by James Little, curated by Ronald Kuchta, Everson Museum of Art, Syracuse, NY

== Group exhibitions ==
- 2022: Whitney Biennial 2022: Quiet as It's Kept, Whitney Museum of American Art, New York
- 2021: The Dirty South: Contemporary Art, Material Culture, and the Sonic Impulse, Virginia Museum of Fine Arts, Richmond, Virginia
- 2019: New York Centric, Art Students League of New York, New York
- 2019: The Shape of Abstraction: Selections from the Ollie Collection, St. Louis Art Museum, St. Louis, Missouri
- 2018: Color/Line/Form, Rosenbaum Contemporary, Boca Raton, Florida
- 2018: The Masters: Teachers and Their Students, Art Students League of New York and Hirschl and Adler Modern, New York
- 2017: Celebrating 30 Years, Gallery Artists: Drawings and Photographs, June Kelly Gallery, New York
- 2016–2017: Circa 1970, curated by Lauren Haynes, Studio Museum in Harlem, New York
- 2016: Beyond Borders: Bill Hutson & Friends, University Museums, Mechanical Hall Gallery, University of Delaware
- 2015: Decoding the Abstract Unlimited Potential, curated by James Austin Murray, Lyons WierGallery, New York
- Outside the Lines: Color Across the Collections, curated by Tricia Laughlin Bloom, organized by the Newark Museum, NJ
- Works on Paper: Selections from the Gallery, Louis Stern Fine Arts, West Hollywood, CA.
- 2014: Black in the Abstract, Part 2: Hard Edges, Soft Curves, organized by Valerie Cassel Oliver, Contemporary Arts Museum Houston, TX, catalogue
- 2012: Today's Visual Language: Southern Abstraction, A Fresh Look, curated by Donan Klooz, curator of exhibitions, Mobile Museum of Art, AL; digital catalogue
- What Only Paint Can Do, curated by Karen Wilkin, Triangle Arts Association, Brooklyn, NY
- 2011: ABSTRACTION (Abstraction to the Power of Infinity), curated by Janet Kurnatowski, organized by the American Abstract Artists, The Ice Box, Crane Arts, Philadelphia, PA
- 2010: Abstract Relations, collaboration between the David C. Driskell Center, University of Maryland and the University of Delaware Museums, co-curators Dr. Julie L. McGee and Dr. Adrienne L. Childs, University of Delaware, Mechanical Hall Gallery, Mineralogical Museum, Newark, DE
- It's A Wonderful 10th, Sideshow Gallery, Brooklyn, NY
- 2008: Shape Shifters: New YorkPainters, The A.D. Gallery, University of North Carolina at Pembroke; catalogue
- 2007: Three One-Man Exhibitions: James Little, Aimé Mpane, George Smith, Station Museum of Contemporary Art, Houston, TX; brochure
- 2006: The 181st Annual Invitational Exhibition of Contemporary American Art, National Academy of Design, New York; catalogue Neo-Plastic Redux, Elizabeth Harris Gallery, New York
- 2005: Different Ways of Seeing: The Expanding World of Abstraction, The Noyes Museum of Contemporary Art, Oceanville, NJ
- Optical Stimulations: American Abstract Artists, Yellow Bird Gallery, Newburgh, NY 50 Plus, Holland Tunnel Gallery, Brooklyn, NY
- Raising the Bar: James Little and Thornton Willis, Sideshow Gallery, Brooklyn, NY
- 2004: Seeds and Roots: Selections from the Permanent Collection, The Studio Museum in Harlem, New York
- A Century of African American Art: The Paul R. Jones Collection, University of Delaware, Newark, DE
- Abstract Identity, Pelham Art Center, NY
- 2003: Theories: Abstract New York, Roger Ramsay Gallery, Chicago, IL
- 2002: No Greater Love, Abstraction, Jack Tilton/Anna Kustera Gallery, New York
- Ajita – Unconquerable, The Station, Houston, TX; catalogue
- 500 Works on Paper, Gary Snyder Fine Art, New York
- Amplified Abstraction, Chapel, Plantage, Doklaan 8-12, Amsterdam, Holland
- 2001: Painted in New York City: Viewpoints of Recent Developments in Abstract Painting, Hofstra Museum, Hofstra University, Hempstead, NY; catalogue
- Dialog and Discourse, Dolan Center Gallery, Friends Academy, Locust Valley, NY
- 2000: Significant Pursuits: Paint and Geometry, Smack Mellon Studios, Brooklyn, NY
- Straight Painting, The Painting Center, New York
- 1999: Straight No Chaser, The Puffin Room, The Puffin Foundation, New York
- The Art of Absolute Desire, 450 Broadway, New York
- The Power of Drawing, Westbeth Gallery, New York
- 1998: New Directions '98' 14th Annual National Juried Fine Arts Exhibition, Duchess County Art Association, Barrett Art Center, Poughkeepsie, NY
- New York Eight, Luise Ross Gallery, New York
- Works On, With and Made Out of Paper, Sideshow 195, Brooklyn, NY
- The African-American Fine Arts Collection of the New Jersey State Museum, New Jersey State Museum, Trenton, NJ
- Postcards from Black America, curated by Rob Perrée, De Beyerd, Center for Contemporary Art in Breda, Netherlands, and the Frans Hals Museum, Haarlem, Netherlands; catalogue
- de leugenaars/the liars (I) Helder en Verzadigd Clear and Saturated, Arti et Amicitiae, Amsterdam, Holland
- Color, Matter, Energy, Galerie Maria Chailloux, Hogeschool van Amsterdam, Holland
