= Hard-edge painting =

Movement in painting

- Lorser Feitelson, Untitled 1952, 40 x 70 inches
- Years active: 1950s-present
- Location: California, United States
- Major figures: Karl Benjamin; Lorser Feitelson; Frederick Hammersley; June Harwood; Helen Lundeberg; John McLaughlin

Hard-edge painting (also referred to as hard edge or hard-edged) is painting in which abrupt transitions are found between color areas. Color areas often consist of one unvarying color. The style is related to geometric abstraction, op art, post-painterly abstraction, and color field.

== History of the term ==
The term “hard-edge painting” was coined in 1959 by writer, curator, and Los Angeles Times art critic Jules Langsner, along with Peter Selz, to describe the work of several painters from California who adopted a knowingly impersonal paint application and delineated areas of color with particular sharpness and clarity. This style was a significant reaction to the more painterly or gestural forms of Abstract expressionism, one of the United States’ primary painting movements at the time. The “hard-edge” approach to abstract painting became widespread in the 1960s, though California was its creative center.

Other earlier art movements have also contained the quality of hard-edgedness; for example, the Precisionists also displayed this quality to a great degree in their work. Hard-edge can be seen to be associated with one or more school of painting, but is also a generally descriptive term, for these qualities found in any painting. Hard-edge painting can be figurative or nonrepresentational.

=== Four Abstract Classicists Exhibition ===
In the late 1950s, Langsner and Peter Selz, then professor at Pomona College, observed a common link among the recent work of Lorser Feitelson (1898–1978), Feitelson's wife Helen Lundeberg (1908–1999), John McLaughlin (1898–1976), Frederick Hammersley (1919–2009), and Karl Benjamin (1925-2012). This group of seven gathered at the Feitelson's home to discuss a group exhibition of this nonfigurative painting style. Curated by Langsner, Four Abstract Classicists opened at the San Francisco Museum of Art in 1959, then traveled to the Los Angeles County Museum of Art in Exposition Park. Helen Lundeberg was not included in the exhibit.

Four Abstract Classicists was renamed West Coast Hard-edge by British art critic and curator Lawrence Alloway when it traveled to the Institute of Contemporary Arts in London, where Alloway was assistant director, and Queen's University in Belfast. The term came into broader use after Alloway used it to describe contemporary American geometric abstract painting featuring "economy of form," "fullness of color," "neatness of surface," and the nonrelational arrangement of forms on the canvas.

=== California Hard-Edge Painting Exhibition ===
In 1964, a second major hard-edge exhibition curated by Jules Langsner, simply titled California Hard-Edge Painting, was held at the Pavilion Gallery in Balboa, CA (also known as the Newport Pavilion) with the cooperation of the Ankrum Gallery, Esther Robles Gallery, Felix Landau Gallery, Ferus Gallery, and Heritage Gallery of Los Angeles. Along with Feitselon, Lundeberg, McLaughlin, Hammersley, and Benjamin, California Hard-Edge Painting included Florence Arnold, John Barbour, Larry Bell, John Coplans, June Harwood, and Dorothy Waldman.

== Legacy ==
In 2000, Tobey C. Moss curated Four Abstract Classicists Plus One at her gallery in Los Angeles. The exhibit again featured John McLaughlin, Feitelson, Hammersley, and Benjamin, and added Lundeberg as the fifth of the original Hard-edge painters. In 2003, Louis Stern Fine Arts presented a retrospective exhibition for Lorser Feitelson entitled Lorser Feitelson and the invention of Hard-edge painting, 1945–1965. The same year, NOHO MODERN showed the works of June Harwood in an exhibition entitled June Harwood: Hard-edge painting Revisited, 1959–1969. Art critic Dave Hickey solidified the place of these 6 artists in The Los Angeles School: Karl Benjamin, Lorser Feitelson, Frederick Hammersley, June Harwood, Helen Lundeberg, and John McLaughlin, an exhibition held at the Ben Maltz Gallery of the Otis Art Institute in Los Angeles in 2004-2005. In 2007-2008, the Orange County Museum of Art exhibited Birth of the Cool: California Art, Design, and Culture at Midcentury, which included the original "four abstract classicists" along with midcentury design, music and film. Birth of the Cool traveled nationwide to the Addison Gallery of American Art, Andover, MA; the Oakland Museum of California, Oakland, CA; the Mildred Kemper Lane Art Museum, St. Louis, MO; and the Jack S. Blanton Museum of Art, Austin, TX.

In 2011, the style was featured prominently at the Getty Museum’s initial iteration of Pacific Standard Time, titled Crosscurrents in L.A. Painting and Sculpture, 1950-1970, which showcased the artistic practices that characterized the postwar L.A. art scene. The exhibition highlighted selections from Louis Stern Fine Arts including Karl Benjamin’s Stage II (1958) and Helen Lundeberg’s Blue Planet (1965).

Louis Stern Fine Arts continues to exhibit and represent the estates of Hard-Edge painters, including Benjamin, Lundeberg, and Feitelson.

== Selected Hard-Edge Artists ==
This style of hard-edge geometric abstraction recalls the earlier work of Kasimir Malevich, Wassily Kandinsky, Theo van Doesburg, and Piet Mondrian. Aside from Feitelson, Lundeberg, McLaughlin, Hammersley, and Benjamin, other artists associated with Hard-edge painting include:

- Herb Aach
- Josef Albers
- Amadour
- Richard Anuszkiewicz
- Mino Argento
- Bettina Grossman
- Max Bill
- Ilya Bolotowsky
- Ralph Coburn
- Nassos Daphnis
- Ronald Davis
- Gene Davis
- Robyn Denny
- Howard Mehring
- Burgoyne Diller
- Burhan Dogancay
- John Ferren
- Peter Halley
- Al Held
- Carmen Herrera
- Ana Mercedes Hoyos
- Robert Indiana
- Ellsworth Kelly
- Günther C. Kirchberger
- Lucian Krukowski
- John Levee
- Alexander Liberman
- Agnes Martin
- George L. K. Morris
- Marion Nicoll
- Kenneth Noland
- Barbro Östlihn
- Georg Karl Pfahler
- Larry Poons
- Mavis Pusey
- Ad Reinhardt
- Deborah Remington
- Bridget Riley
- Ivo Ringe
- Ludwig Sander
- Fanny Sanin
- David Simpson
- Leon Polk Smith
- Julian Stanczak
- Frank Stella
- John Stephan
- Myron Stout
- Robert Swain
- Leo Valledor
- Victor Vasarely
- Charmion von Wiegand
- Neil Williams
- Sanford Wurmfeld
- Jack Youngerman
- Larry Zox

== See also ==
- Abstract art
- Abstract Imagists
- Concrete art
- Formalism (art)
- Lyrical abstraction
- Minimal art
- Modern art
- Shaped canvas
- Verdadism

== Sources ==
- NOHO MODERN (2003) June Harwood: Hard-Edge Painting Revisited, 1959–1969 exhibition catalogue,
- Louis Stern Fine Arts (2003) Lorser Feitelson and the Invention of Hard-Edge Painting, 1945–1965 exhibition catalogue,
- Moss, Tobey C. (2000). Four Abstract Classicists Plus One exhibition catalogue,
- Nittve, et al. (1998). Sunshine & Noir: Art in LA 1960–1997. Louisiana Museum of Modern Art.
- Mastin, Catharine. (2022). Marion Nicoll: Life & Work. Toronto: Art Canada Institute, 2022. ISBN 978-1-4871-0301-9
