= Keith Puccinelli =

American artist (1950-2017)

Keith Puccinelli (May 5, 1950 – September 18, 2017 in San Jose, California) was an American artist based in Ventura, California. He created drawings, sculptures, and interactive installations.

Puccinelli received his BFA degree from San Jose State University in 1973. He opened Puccinelli Design in 1983, and enjoyed a 20-year period of national and international recognition for his work in design, illustration, and advertising. Over the past 30 years, Puccinelli has exhibited works on paper and multi-media installations in the Southern California area, and his work is included in many private collections. His most recent exhibition, The Wondercommon, appears at Ben Maltz Gallery, OTIS College of Art and Design, Los Angeles, CA, April 19 – July 3, 2008.

== His work ==
Working in the vein of Jeffrey Vallance, Michael C. McMillen, Jim Shaw, and Robbie Conal, Puccinelli uses an irreverent quick wit, modest materials, and tableaux to broach the conflict between the preciousness of life and man’s disregard for life during times of war to create a kind of carnival of sorrow. The strong juxtaposition of materials and a passion for wordplay often brings a sense of humor to glaze or emphasize the serious or tragic presented in the work. His most recent work is featured in a solo exhibition titled The Wondercommon at Ben Maltz Gallery, Otis College of Art and Design, April 19 – July 3, 2008. The exhibition includes a new body of drawings, sculptures, and an interactive installation called “The Morgue.” The title of the exhibition, The Wondercommon, combines two seemingly opposite ideas into one and refers in part to the artist’s use of common materials and tinkering techniques to evoke a sense of wonder or the wonderful. Simple pen and ink drawings on paper and sculptures are made out of everyday materials like twigs, leaves, shoes, pipe, glue, house paint, varnish, mud, and bone. The title is also a direct reference to the German word wunderkammer or a “cabinet of curiosities,” which is the genesis of museums as we know them today.

“For many years, Puccinelli has used the image of the clown in his work as an alter ego because he has ancestral links to the 16th-century Italian commedia dell’arte. This internationally popular improvisational form of street theater had a set roster of exaggerated characters who wore masks, were acrobats and jugglers—the precursors to modern day clowns. “Pulcinella” is a stock trickster character whose name was anglicized to “Punchinello” and in England transformed into the infamous “Punch” of “Punch and Judy.” Pulcinella is often portrayed as a freak with some kind of physical deformity like a hump or a limp, has limited speech, and is cunning and unruly. This satirical type of theater wove conventional story plots with local events or political scandals of the day to make their audiences laugh at the current state of affairs. Exaggeration, distortion, hyperbole, double entendre and word play are their tools and Puccinelli applies them often in his art. He tends to make us laugh or snicker first at the absurdity of the image before we do the double take and see the seriousness of the commentary.” -- Meg Linton, from Keith Puccinelli: The Wondercommon, 2008

== Exhibitions ==
Selected Solo and Group Exhibition from the Last Ten Years

- 2018 "Selected works" solo exhibition, AD&A Museum, University of California, Santa Barbara
- 2008 “The Wondercommon” solo exhibition, Ben Maltz Gallery, Otis College of Art and Design, Los Angeles
- 2007 “Sonotube” group invitational, Santa Barbara Contemporary Arts Forum
- 2005 “Drawing, Advanced” 4-person exhibition, Santa Barbara City College Atkinson Gallery
- 2005 “Fragments” 3-person exhibition, domestic setting, Los Angeles
- 2004 “Humoring Inklings” 3-person exhibition, Santa Barbara Contemporary Arts Forum
- 2004 “Pretty Vase” group exhibition, Sullivan Goss, Santa Barbara
- 2004 “Oh, just passing through” group exhibition, Blur @ Bekins, Santa Barbara
- 2003 “Sex Show” group exhibition, Monlleo Gallery, Santa Barbara
- 2002 “Lucky is again” solo exhibition, Puccinelli Studio, Ventura County
- 2001 “Artistic Pairings” group exhibition, Patricia Correia Gallery, Santa Monica
- 2000 “whadda buncha clowns” solo exhibition, SBCAF blue wall at Alias Wavefront
- 2000 “Portraits New Millennium” group exhibition, Santa Barbara Contemporary Arts Forum
- 2000 “First Night Sculpture” solo installation, City of Santa Barbara, de la Guerra Plaza
- 1999 “Mass TransArt” 7-person installation, UC Santa Barbara Art Museum
- 1998 “Artists Collect” group exhibition, Santa Barbara Contemporary Arts Forum
- 1998 “PAWS” guerrilla installation, SB City Parking Lot #5
- 1998 “Il Kaboom Grosso” 2-person installation, big, Santa Barbara

== Books ==
Meg Linton, Keith Puccinelli: The Wondercommon, (Ben Maltz Gallery, Otis College of Art and Design, 2008.) ISBN 0-9677994-1-4

== Other links ==
- https://web.archive.org/web/20080828170713/http://www.uam.ucsb.edu/Pages/bus_freezer_dtl.html
- https://web.archive.org/web/20081123043913/http://designarchives.aiga.org/entry.cfm/eid_4455
- https://web.archive.org/web/20110718092917/http://emilymay.wordpress.com/2007/10/23/how-to-use-a-sonotube-review-of-the-sbcaf-exhibition/
- http://www.ia.ucsb.edu/pa/display.aspx?pkey=285
- http://www.sbcc.edu/art/website/gallery2/main.php?g2_itemId=1361
- https://web.archive.org/web/20080705015941/http://www.pasadenaartalliance.org/grantees/benmaltz2008.html
- http://www.coastalview.com/obituaries/keith-julius-puccinelli/article_02342b0e-aa11-11e7-b31d-ff4c9bdfc2c9.html
