= Jepson Art Institute =

Former art school in Los Angeles, California

Coordinates: 34°3′34.45″N 118°17′9.59″W

Jepson Art Institute, founded in 1945 by artist Herbert Jepson, was an art school located at 2861 West 7th Street in the Westlake district of central Los Angeles, California.

It flourished from 1947 to 1953 — becoming an important center for experimental figure drawing, art theory (aesthetics) and printmaking. Prior to this, Jepson served as an instructor at L.A.'s esteemed Chouinard Art Institute for a dozen years. The Jepson Art Institute closed in 1954.

== Faculty ==
On the faculty, internationally acclaimed figurative artists Rico Lebrun and Francis de Erdely attracted students who later achieved distinction in their own fields such as sculptor Marisol Escobar ("Marisol"), painters Joseph Glasco, Frederick Hammersley and Delmer J. Yoakum, illustrator David Passalaqua, art director Richard Bousman, and architectural sculptor Malcolm Leland.

Show business luminaries of the period such as Vincent Price, Zero Mostel and comedian Fannie Brice (artist/instructor William Brice's mother) often came to the Jepson Art Institute to hear the lectures of Lebrun and to sit in on classes with Jepson, who was known as a consummate figure draughtsman.

The art of serigraphy was pioneered at the Jepson Art Institute by printmaker Guy Maccoy, who was among the first to develop the techniques of silk screen printing as a fine art medium. Jepson was also the founder of the Western Institute of Serigraphy.

Other instructors included Hammersley, William Brice, Howard Warshaw, Milly Rocque, Geno Pettit and Roger Hollenbeck. The Institute's Design department included teachers Bill Moore, a well known graphic designer, advertising art director C. Manfred Grove, Gene Allen, and Kip Stewart, who later became a well-known California designer.

== Notable alumni ==
- Wallace Berman
- Frank Tolles Chamberlin
- Marisol Escobar
- Joseph Glasco
- James Grant
- Frederick Hammersley
- Robert Irwin
- Shirley Silvey
- Morton Traylor
- David Weidman
- Delmer J. Yoakum
