= Mark Dean Veca =

American artist

Mark Dean Veca is an American artist (born 1963) based in Altadena, California. He creates paintings, drawings and large-scale installations.

== Biography ==
Mark Dean Veca was born in Shreveport, Louisiana, and received his Bachelor of Fine Arts from Otis College of Art and Design in Los Angeles in 1985.

Veca has exhibited throughout the United States, Europe, and Japan at institutions such as the Aldrich Contemporary Art Museum, PS 1 Contemporary Art Center, the Brooklyn Museum, the Bronx Museum of the Arts, and the Yerba Buena Center for the Arts. His work has been reviewed in numerous publications including The New York Times, Artforum, Art in America, Art Review, Juxtapoz, and Flash Art.

Veca conducted one-on-one master critiques with undergraduate and graduate Fine Arts students at Otis College of Art and Design in the fall of 2008 as part of the Jennifer Howard Coleman Distinguished Lectureship and Residency. Awards and honors include a C.O.L.A. 2011 Individual Artist Fellowship, Pollock-Krasner Foundation Grant, and three New York Foundation for the Arts Fellowships. His work is included in numerous public collections including the Deutsche Bank Collection, Frederick R. Weisman Art Foundation Collection, and the Pennsylvania Academy of Fine Arts. In April 2018, the Crocker Art Museum announced Mark Dean Veca as the second recipient of the John S. Knudsen Endowment Fund's $25,000 prize. Also upcoming, Veca has been commissioned to create a major new work of permanent public art for the new Los Angeles Metro station at Wilshire Boulevard and La Brea Avenue, opening in 2023.

He currently lives in Los Angeles.

== Veca's work ==
Veca is known for creating paintings, drawings and installations that portray surreal cartoons, psychedelic landscapes, and pop culture iconography while also being inspired by long-established decorative motifs.

He is widely recognized for his all-encompassing installations that surround the viewer and incite a sense of awe. Revealing fantastical, humorous, aggressive, or sexual imagery with both frenzy and pattern-like precision, his works often recall a modernized type of toile painting.

In the 1998 catalogue for Veca's El Gloominator exhibition, Steve Mitchell asserts, "Veca works in the meticulous tradition of the fresco painter to produce an image that paradoxically evokes the immediacy of the graffiti artist."

Carlo McCormick states in a Juxtapoz magazine article that within the artist's installation work, "confines create ideas, obstacles dictate illusions, and the proliferation of optic information ignites a kind of brain-searing explosion."

In 2004, Veca was commissioned by Nike to design an installation as well as a limited edition product series. Entitled Pulsation, the work was exhibited at 255 in New York.

Veca's 2007 solo exhibition, Imbroglio (October 20 – November 17, 2007), was held at the Jonathan LeVine Gallery and was his most ambitious New York exhibition thus far. Veca presented 17 new paintings on panel, which were incorporated into an installation.

In 2012, Veca's solo exhibition Raging Opulence was described as "MAD Magazine meets Versailles in Mark Dean Veca’s loud yet regal salon installation". Veca's signature style "grounded in mesmerizing line-work and psychedelic patterns" was perfectly displayed in his 2017 show PSYCHOBIODELICA, which was "an exhibit that looks into how Veca's art has found its place in the world of gig posters".

His most recent exhibition was in 2020 at California State University Northridge; the exhibition was a duo show entitled Graphic Subversion with Mark Steven Greenfield. The exhibition was focused on graphic language, with Veca utilizing specific cultural icons. In regards to Graphic Subversion, curator Betty Brown stated "their work urges us to not to accept media images as neutral, but to explore the nature of their history and impact, and what they communicate both overtly and covertly."

Veca has also been commissioned to create a permanent public art work for the new Metro Station in Los Angeles, which will be opening in 2023.

== Awards ==
Most recently, Veca was awarded a An artist Residency at The MacDowell Colony in 2019. Additionally, in 2018, Veca was awarded the John S. Knudsen Prize. In 2011, Veca was awarded the Individual Artist Fellowship with C.O.L.A.; Veca additionally earned a painting fellowship with New York Foundation in 2008. Veca was also the Honoree of the fall 2008 Jennifer Howard Coleman Distinguished Lectureship and Residency at Otis College of Art and Design. In 2006, he was awarded a Pollock-Krasner Foundation Grant. Amongst his many honors, Veca has thrice received the New York Foundation for the Arts Fellowship in painting and has carried out artist residencies for institutions such as the Bronx Museum, the MacDowell Colony, and Villa Montalvo.

== Solo exhibitions ==
- El Gloominator, State University of New York at Buffalo Art Gallery, Buffalo, NY, 1998
- Picturing Florida, Schmidt Center Gallery, Florida Atlantic University, Boca Raton, FL (with Ellen Harvey), 2006
- Ben Maltz Gallery, Otis College of Art and Design, Los Angeles, October 11 – December 6, 2008
- Paintings, Wall Drawings, and Collaborations, University Art Gallery, University of California at San Diego, La Jolla, CA, January 30–15 March 2009
- Revenge of Phantasmagoria, Instituto Cultural de Cabañas, Guadalajara, Mexico. Organized by the Ben Maltz Gallery at Otis College of Art and Design, 2009/10.
- As Cold As They Come, Jonathan Le Vine Gallery, New York, NY, 2009
- When the Shit Hits the Fan, Western Project, Los Angeles, CA, 2010
- Impulse, The Lab Gallery, New York, NY, 2011
- Mark Dean Veca: Raging Opulence, San Jose Museum of Art, San Jose, CA, 2012
- Mark Dean Veca: Twenty Years, Western Project, Los Angeles, CA, 2013
- Made for You and Me, Cristin Tierney Gallery, New York, 2013
- Divinity Degenerate, Harris Art Gallery, University of La Verne, La Verne, CA, 2013
- Everlast, Western Project, Los Angeles, CA, 2014
- Le Poppy Den, David B. Smith Gallery, Denver, CO, 2014
- Pony Show, Site:Lab, Grand Rapids, MI, 2015
- Mark Dean Veca: The Mundane and the Sublime, Duke Art Gallery, Azusa Pacific University, Azusa, CA (catalogue with essay by David Pagel), 2016
- PsychoBioDelica: The Graphic World of Mark Dean Veca, Haight Street Art Center, San Francisco, CA, and Agent Ink Gallery, Santa Rosa, CA, 2017
- Passaggio di Pop, Crocker Art Museum, Sacramento, CA, 2018
- The Troubled Teens (Work of a Decade), Jason Vass Gallery, Los Angeles, CA, 2019
- 35-Year Mid-Career Survey, Museum of Art and History, Lancaster, CA (postponed due to COVID-19 pandemic), 2020
- Graphic Subversion, California State University Northridge Main Art Gallery, Northridge, CA (with Mark Steven Greenfield) (catalog) 2020
