= Ben Maltz Gallery =

Art gallery in Los Angeles, California, United States

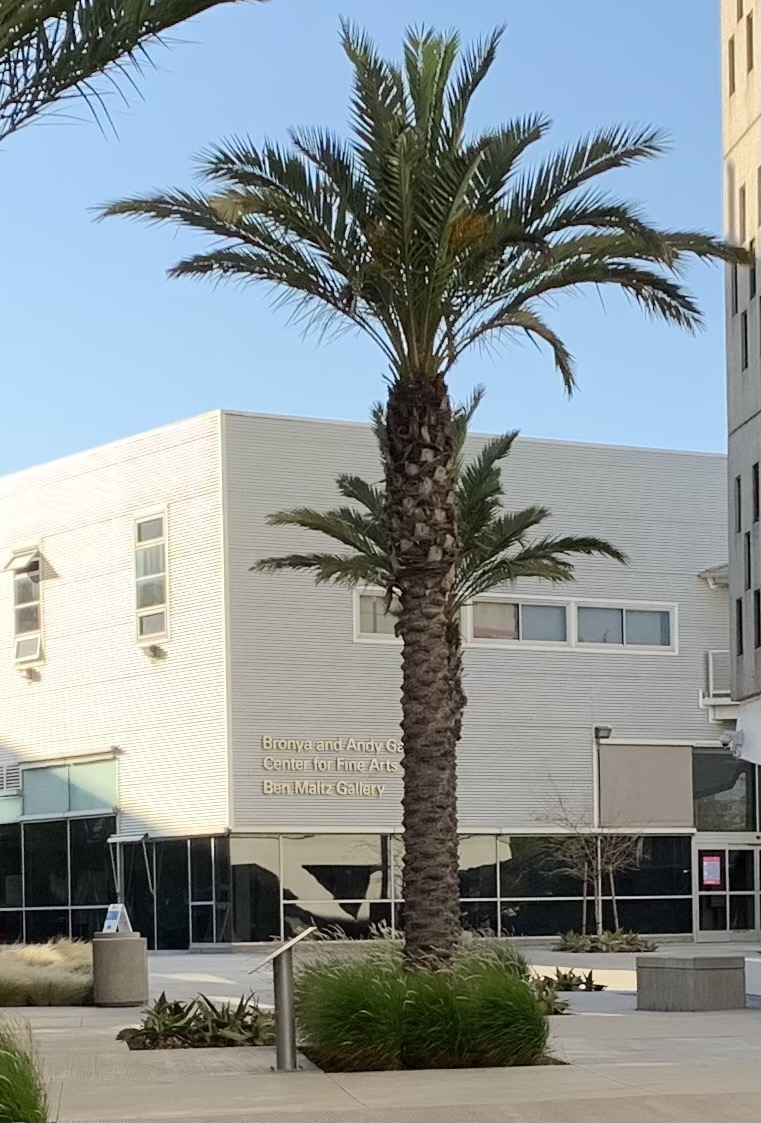
- Interactive map of Ben Maltz Gallery

Construction
- Closed: Permanently closed

The Ben Maltz Gallery at the Otis College of Art and Design was an art space in Los Angeles, California, that closed permanently in 2020.

== History ==
The Ben Maltz Gallery presented group and solo exhibitions in a variety of media. The main focus was showcasing contemporary art that pushes the boundaries of form and subject matter in the context of national and international programming. Serving the local art community, the public, and Otis students and faculty, it presented emerging and established Los Angeles talent as well as international artists.

Originally named the Otis Gallery, the exhibition space was initially sited on the college's downtown grounds. In August 2001, the Gallery moved to Otis’ Westchester campus and was dedicated in honor of Benjamin N. Maltz (1901–1993), a local businessman and founding director of City National Bank, who was a supporter of many nonprofit art organizations. Designed by the Los Angeles–based Frederick Fisher and Partners, the 3,500 sq ft (330 m^{2}) Gallery was located on the ground floor of the Bronya and Andy Galef Center for Fine Arts, which also houses the Bolsky Gallery for student exhibitions, numerous art studios, critique rooms, and offices.

== Management ==
Anne Ayres, a respected Los Angeles art historian and curator, managed the Gallery from 1988 to 2003 after taking the reins from Otis’ former School Director, Al Nodel. Meg Linton succeeded Ayres and directed the Gallery from 2003 to 2015. Linton was previously the executive director of the Santa Barbara Contemporary Arts Forum and had held many curatorial and teaching positions in California and New York. From 2015 to 2022, Kate McNamara served as gallery director. McNamara was previously Director and Chief Curator at the Boston University Art Gallery and held positions in curation at MoMA PS1 and the Bronx Museum of the Arts.

== Public Programs ==
The Ben Maltz Gallery oversaw the Otis College's "Jennifer Howard Coleman Distinguished Lectureship and Residency." This program was created in 1995 in collaboration with the Samuel Goldwyn Foundation to pay tribute to the memory of Jennifer Howard Coleman, who was an artist and Otis alumna. The biannual appointment acknowledged leading contemporary painters by granting a residency at the college and according them a solo exhibition at the Ben Maltz Gallery.

The "Otis Speaks" lecture program was also produced in association with the Ben Maltz Gallery. Free and open to the public, the weekly event series offered a platform for contemporary artists, designers, curators, filmmakers, writers and critics to share their projects and ideas about the visual world.

Past exhibitions include BROODWORK, Keith Puccinelli, Travis Somerville, and Mark Dean Veca.

== Recognition ==
The Ben Maltz Gallery was the recipient of the "Best Exhibition in an Alternative Space Award" by the International Critics Association for Karen Carson's 1996 "The Language of Space" exhibition.
