= Georg Karl Pfahler =

German painter (1926–2002

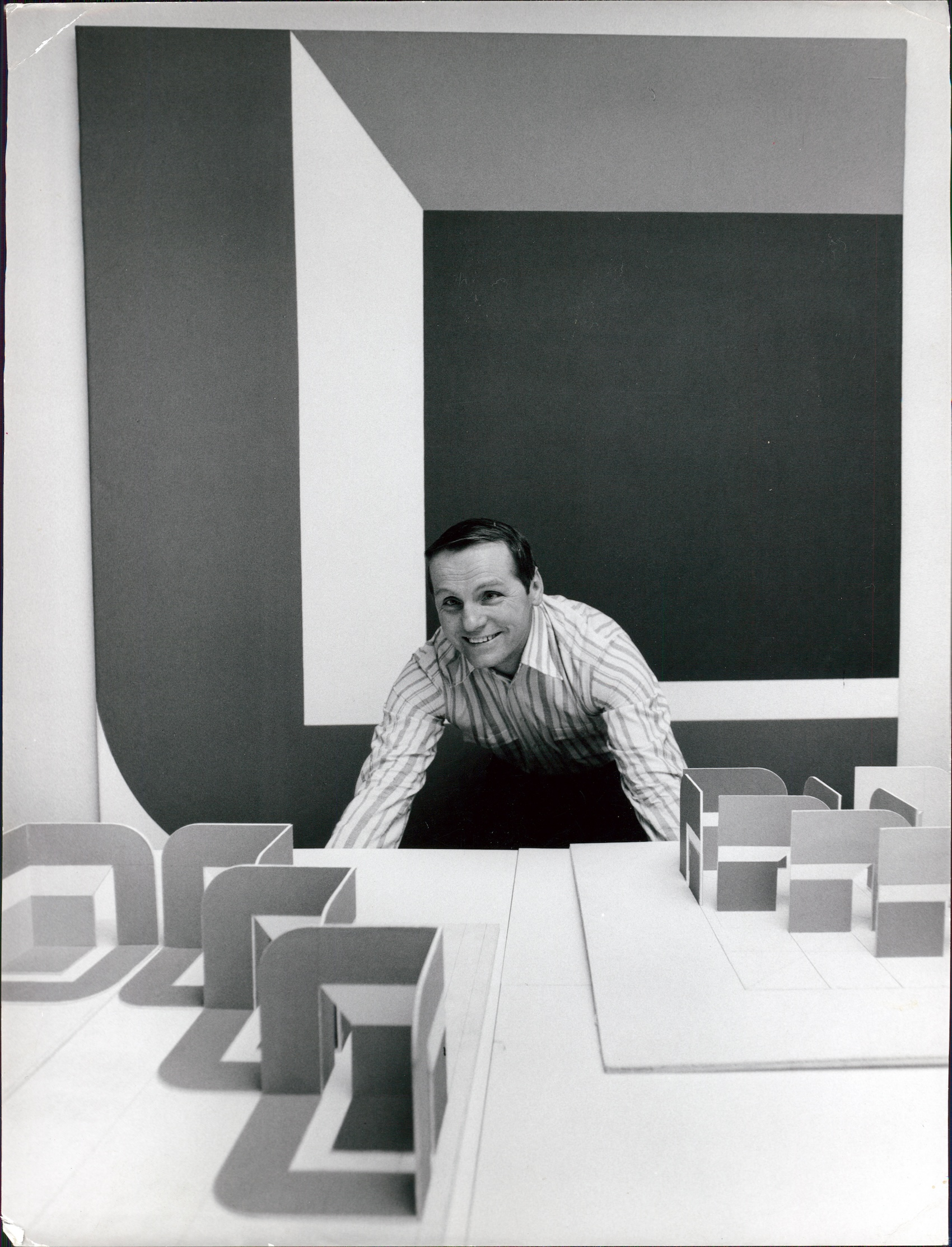

Georg Karl Pfahler (8 October 1926 – 6 January 2002) was the first German hard edge painter, printmaker and sculptor, and one of the leading proponents of post-war color field painting in Germany and Europe.

== Biography ==
After enrolling at the Academy of Fine Arts, Nuremberg between 1948 and 1949, Pfahler pursued his artistic training at State Academy of Fine Arts in Stuttgart, which he attended until 1954. Although Pfahler had mainly worked in ceramics during his student days, as a freelance artist, he focused increasingly on painting. After his early "Metropolitan" pictures, Pfahler developed pictorial configurations around 1956, in which he experimented with the spatial effects of color in a manner reminiscent of the pointillist technique used by French Divisionists. This phase gave way to works which, from 1956, were based on Action Painting and Art Informel. In 1956 he founded gruppe 11 (group 11) together with Günther C. Kirchberger. The group had exhibitions in Munich, Brussel, Rome and London in 1957–59.

The term "formativ" (formative), which he added to the titles of his pictures from 1958 on, marked his emancipation as a painter from the more formless style influenced by Willi Baumeister. An intention to clarify new ways of seeing and fresh viewpoints lead to ink drawings, followed by collages. In the upcoming years, he simplified the geometrical forms and ultimately became mere vehicles for colors and their interrelations. In about 1962 block-like forms turned into crisply demarcated color surfaces, which elevate Pfahler to being the sole representative of "Hard-Edge Painting" in Germany. He achieved his international breakthrough in exhibitions such as "Signale" 1965 in Basel, "Formen der Farbe" 1967 in Amsterdam, Stuttgart and Bern or "Painting and Sculpture from Europe" 1968 in New York City, where he presented the pictures he created in the early 1960s at Fischbach Gallery curated by Barnett Newman. Given his interest in the spatial properties of color, it is in its nature that in 1965 Pfahler should have begun to really translate his works into the third dimension in his "Farb-Raum-Objekte" (color space objects) and the 1969 "Farbräume" (color spaces). Since 1965 realized numerous architectural projects, which have been a substantial contribution towards the development to art in architecture and public spaces in post-war Germany. Amongst Thomas Lenk, Heinz Mack and Günther Uecker, Pfahler was chosen to provide the German pavilion to the Venice Biennale in 1970 and in 1981 he was chosen to represent German art at the Sao Paulo Biennale.

After working as a guest lecturer at Helwan University in Cairo in 1981, he taught at the Academy of Fine Arts, in Nuremberg from 1984 to 1992. Since 1982 Pfahler has lectured at the "Internationale Sommerakademie für Bildende Kunst Salzburg" in Salzburg. In 1999 he was given the honorable task of designing the conference room of the Council of Elders in the German Reichstag Building.

== Personal exhibitions (selection) ==
- 2019 "Georg Karl Pfahler: Color and Space", QG Gallery, Brussels
- 2001: "Georg Karl Pfahler", Von der Heydt Museum, Wuppertal
- 2001: "Georg Karl Pfahler", Kunstsammlungen Chemnitz, Chemnitz
- 1992: "Georg Karl Pfahler", Galerie Neuendorf, Frankfurt am Main
- 1985: "G. K. Pfahler – neue Bilder", Kunsthalle Mannheim, Mannheim
- 1975: "G. K. Pfahler: Präkonzeptionen", Staatsgalerie Stuttgart, Stuttgart

== Literature (selection) ==
- Galerie Neuendorf (1992). "Georg Karl Pfahler", Frankfurt am Main: Galerie Neuendorf Publishing
- Städtische Kunsthalle Mannheim (1985). "Georg Karl Pfahler. Neue Bilder", Mannheim: Medro Publishing
