= David Weidman =

American animator

- Born: June 28, 1921
- Died: August 6, 2014 (aged 93)
- Known for: Animation

David Weidman (June 28, 1921 – August 6, 2014) was an American animator, animation artist and silkscreen print artist known for his mid-century modern works, including posters, prints and ceramics. Weidman began his career in animation as a background artist during the 1950s and 1960s. During his later life, Weidman's silkscreens were featured in the sets of the AMC television series, Mad Men, which revived interest in his work. In 2010, the Los Angeles Times referred to Weidman as possibly "the most famous unknown artist."

Weidman was born in the Belvedere Gardens section of present-day East Los Angeles on June 28, 1921. He initially attended Garfield High School, but transferred to Manual Arts High School to focus on an art career. He received a scholarship to Otis Art Institute, but never attended because of the outbreak of World War II, which led to his enlistment in the United States Navy. He used the GI Bill to enroll at Jepson Art Institute following the war. He met his future wife, Dorothy, at Jepson, where she was a silkscreen instructor. The couple married in 1953.

Weidman began his career with animator John Hubley. He then became a background artist and painter at United Productions of America, better known as UPA. He is credited with helping UPA develop the "distinctive modern style" which became a hallmark of the animation studio's productions. His television series and special credits with UPA animation included The Famous Adventures of Mr. Magoo, The Gerald McBoing-Boing Show and Mister Magoo's Christmas Carol (1962). Aside from his work at UPA, Weidman also worked on television shorts for Crusader Rabbit, Popeye, and Fractured Fairy Tales.

David Weidman briefly left animation to focus on silkscreening after becoming frustrated with a group-centered animation process. Weidman developed a blotting process to create original works. In a 2013 interview with Greater Long Beach, he described how he utilized pictures of objects or blocks of color with "varying degrees of transparency." His prints often mimic the backdrops he painted for 1960s era animated cartoons. He opened a small gallery and workshop located behind a liquor store on La Cienega Boulevard in Los Angeles. He gained a corporate clientele, who used his prints in hotels and other public buildings. However, he disliked having to tailor his work, telling Find Art in a 2014 interview, "When clients began dictating to me the color and the subject, they took me off my rails." He created thousands of silkscreens, but few were purchased by collectors. Some works were priced as low as ten dollars. His printing shop gradually transformed into a custom framing business.

Weidman returned to animation during the middle of the 1960s. He worked on Wacky Races and Dastardly and Muttley in Their Flying Machines for Hanna-Barbera. He also returned to UPA to work on Uncle Sam Magoo (1970), the last Mr. Magoo television special.

While he continued to produce posters and ceramics for decades, Weidman stopped creating silkscreen prints around 1980 due to the work-intensive nature of the process. He did not begin creating new silkscreens again until his artwork was "discovered" or "rediscovered" circa 2008 when he was well into his 80s.

Interest in Weidman's pieces were revived with the premiere of Mad Men, which first aired in 2007. Mad Men's set designer, Claudette Didul, is quoted in an article by David A. Keeps of the Los Angeles Times, "The style is very distinctive and indicative of that era and the popularity of Danish modern...They remind me of pictures I saw growing up and seemed in keeping with Peggy's sensibilities and reflect her younger and somewhat more cheerful outlook." Weidman's work was used to colorfully decorate the set in Peggy Olson's office and other rooms in the fictional 1960s ad agency.

The inclusion of Weidman's prints in Mad Men led to new opportunities. Urban Outfitters licensed a line of pillows emblazon with Weidman's mid-century art. In 2008, Steven Kurutz, a writer for The New York Times published a book on the artist and his work, "The Whimsical Works of David Weidman" through Gingko Press. A retrospective of his work opened on June 28, 2014, at the Weidman Gallery, now located on Melrose Avenue. Weidman attended the opening of exhibition, which ran until July 31, 2014.

David Weidman died of congestive heart failure at his home in the Highland Park neighborhood of Los Angeles on August 6, 2014, at the age of 93. He had lived with his wife and family in the home since they built it in the 1950s. He was survived by his wife, Dorothy Weidman, whom he married in 1953, and three children, Lenna Weidman, Josh Weidman and Troy Weidman.
