= June Harwood =

American artist (1933–2015)

- Harwood in her studio, late 1960s
- Born: 1933; Middleton, New York
- Died: 2015 (aged 81–82)
- Known for: Painting
- Movement: Abstract, Hard-Edge
- Website: www.juneharwoodtrust.com

June Harwood (June 16, 1933 – January, 2015) was an American painter based in California who made a name for herself in the 1960s as an inventive artist of the hard-edge movement.

== Life ==
June Harwood was born in Middleton, New York, and spent much of her childhood in the Adirondacks in northern New York State. In the halcyon days, she would row a boat across the lake, anchor in an inlet and paint small watercolor landscapes. These days contributed largely to her interest in art, and specifically, in landscapes which recur in various forms during her painting career.

She received a Bachelor of Fine Arts degree from Syracuse University in 1953 and a Master of Arts degree from California State University, Los Angeles in 1957. She was a teacher at Hollywood High School in Los Angeles from 1958 to 1970, and at the Los Angeles Valley College from 1975 to 1993, where she became a professor and, for a period, chairperson of the Art Department.".

After she received her BFA from Syracuse University in 1953, Harwood moved to California. There she worked at the Los Angeles Art Association and became familiar with the local art scene, and met fellow hard-edge painters Lorser Feitelson and Helen Lundeberg. Feitelson supported and encouraged her work considerably, and eventually mentioned her work to Jules Langsner, a noted writer, critic, and art historian. Harwood and Langsner married in Rome, Italy in 1965. The couple spent their honeymoon in Paris with Man Ray.

On teaching art: "I feel I can teach well and understand what kids are groping for," she told The Times in 1968. "The art field has never been more wide open or accepted, but at the same time, there are so many possible directions."She told her students that no matter what direction they chose, the basic formula for finding meaning in their work is always the same. "To be a painter, you have to be able to see yourself and understand," she said, "and this is difficult for any generation."

== Painting career ==
Harwood's progression toward Hard-edge painting first developed while pursuing her BFA at Syracuse University in the 1950s, where a focus on Abstract Expressionism, classicism, and balance led to her trademark style. In an interview with Geoform, Harwood stated, "In nature most shapes can be reduced to geometric forms. It seemed to me to be a logical approach to use geometric forms as a basis for painting and as a result, my work became associated with a movement known as Hard-edge—flat shapes with hard, clean edges...much of my painting develops intuitively and sometimes accidentally or serendipitously. But in all cases, the result should be to make all of the pieces fit, that there should be a "sense of rightness" about the total configuration."

Harwood’s early paintings consisted of rigid, flat planes of color and interlocking forms – pure abstraction with no representational content. She often painted with acrylics, which was uncommon for painters of her time, and used tape to define the edges of her shapes. "My paint application was uniform, that is to say that no brush strokes were evident, creating impeccable, flat surfaces. Thus there would be no distraction from the intent, which was to create an interplay of ‘colorforms.’ Jules (Langsner) used this term to mean that color and form are one."

Her work evolved to include curves, loops, and networks of lines that flirted with Op-Art, sometimes painted with metallic paint to accentuate the play of light on the surface of the canvas. In the 70s, her large, discreet forms began to break apart, as she became interested in kinetics and motion. In the 90s and 2000s, her edges softened and her brushwork became more painterly in works that recalled simple landscapes. In later years she returned to the hard-edged forms that she began exploring sixty years before.

Times art critic Christopher Knight, in reviewing a 2003 retrospective of her work at NoHo Modern in North Hollywood, said, "Following the trajectory of these paintings is rather like watching tectonic plates begin to shift, break apart and slowly bend beneath unseen forces of stoppable pressure – rather like the unfolding decade of the 1960s itself."

== Exhibitions and collections ==
Though Harwood was not in the first exhibition considered to be hard-edge, "Four Abstract Classicists" curated by Jules Langsner in 1959, her works were included in the 1964 hard-edge show, "California Hard Edge Painting," in Balboa Pavilion Gallery in Orange County, also curated by Langsner.

She was included in many important hard-edge exhibitions in and around Southern California. Most significantly in "California Hard Edge Painting" and Dave Hickey's 2004 homage to "The Los Angeles School" exhibited at Otis College of Art and Design. Harwood's work can be found in numerous private, corporate and public collections, including in California: California State University, Los Angeles; the Long Beach Museum of Art; Los Angeles Valley College; the Newport Museum of Art; the San Jose Museum of Art; the University of Southern California, Los Angeles; and the University of California, Santa Barbara.
