= Delmer J. Yoakum =

American painter

- Born: December 6, 1915; St. Joseph, Missouri
- Died: October 25, 1997 (aged 81)
- Political party: Democratic

Delmer J. Yoakum (December 6, 1915 – October 25, 1997) was an American fine artist, oil and watercolor painter, designer, serigrapher, and Disneyland and Hollywood motion picture studio scenic artist.

== Early life ==
Delmar Yoakum was born in St. Joseph, Missouri. Throughout his childhood, he was surrounded by artists, and his mother was a painter. After dismissing his hope of studying music, painting became his passion. As a boy in the late 1930s, he received a scholarship for four consecutive years to study each summer with Thomas Hart Benton at Kansas City Art Institute.

After serving in the United States Navy during World War II, he moved to Los Angeles and studied with Henry Lee McFee, Phil Dike, and Rico Lebrun; and at Chouinard Art Institute, Jepson Art Institute, and the University of Southern California's Roski School of Fine Arts.

== Professional life ==
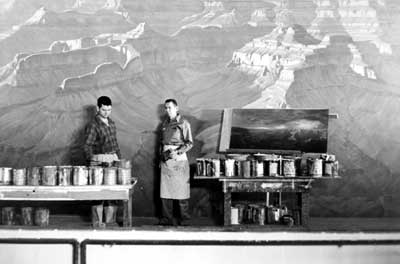
Del Yoakum (left) working with another artist to paint the dioramic Grand Canyon scene at Disneyland

Yoakum's occupation was that of a painter, designer, and Motion Picture Artist in Hollywood, California from 1952 to 1972. Over 21 years, he worked for Paramount, 20th Century Fox, and MGM, and did special assignments for Walt Disney Studios. During this time, he also did his own fine art painting in his own studio.

Among his many accomplishments during his career, he also painted the Grand Canyon and Primeval World Diorama scenery (viewable from the train of Disneyland Railroad), portions of Pirates of the Caribbean, It's a Small World and the Haunted Mansion at Disneyland in California. He also painted scenery for movies such as The Shoes of the Fisherman, for which he recreated the panel about the life of Moses and parts of the Last Judgment by Michelangelo, for the interior of the Sistine Chapel (MGM Studios).

He created the city of Jerusalem for The Robe (which won the 1953 Academy Award for Best Art Direction–Set Decoration, Color), after which he created a 600-foot cyclorama that backed the safari camp set of The Snows of Kilimanjaro. Other films he created dioramic scenes for include Billy Wilder's Some Like It Hot (nominated for the 1959 Best Art Direction-Set Decoration, Black-and-White Oscar), The King and I, Niagara, Alfred Hitchcock's North by Northwest (the Mount Rushmore scene) and many others. During his term at 20th Century Fox, he also worked on many of the Marilyn Monroe pictures and one of the Elvis Presley movies.

Yoakum's work has been exhibited in over 50 galleries, associations, museums, festivals, schools, colleges, fairs and art shows. He also contributed paintings to a number of invitational group shows, including two in Mexico. He received over 30 awards, and his paintings also received national recognition in art publications, including a number of art books and several art magazines over the years.

== Personal life ==
Del was married to his wife Barbara Yoakum for over 50 years. He had three children: Robert, Bob, and Cathleen. He lived in Sedona, Arizona for more than 25 years. He was a lifelong Democrat and a committed Christian, painting Christ's Crucifixion (which hangs in England's Coventry Cathedral) and Resurrection (which is in the permanent collection of St. Luke's Episcopal Church in Sedona).

== Publications ==
- Who's Who in American Art
- Who's Who in the West
- American Artist Magazine
- Newport Magazine Cover
- The Illustrator (Magazine)
- Dictionary of International Biography
- Art News Magazine
- International Directory (Cambridge, England)
- "Landscapes" (Book), Davis Publications, Inc., 1977
- Arizona Highways (Magazine), 1981
- Road Runner (Book Cover), 1985
- American Artists (Book), 1985
- The California Style (Book), 1985
- Sedona Heritage: Arizona Artists (Book), 1997
- Kudos (Magazine), 2006

== Memberships ==
- National Watercolor Society (Past President 1961 and Honorary Life Member)
- Inglewood Art League (Honorary Life Member)
- Artist Equity Board Member (1951 through 1955)
- National Society of Literature and the Arts
- Sedona Art Center, Sedona, Arizona

== Awards ==
Yoakum (left) with his painting "Sunset Express" at an art show in the city of Avalon where he won "Best of Show" in 1967

(WC = Water Color)

- National GI Exhibit, Grand Prize, 1948, Santa Monica, CA
- Adahl Hyde Morrison Silver Medal 2nd Award, Oakland, CA
- Frye Museum Edouvard Manet Award, 1958, Seattle, WA
- Santa Monica Arts, Ass'n, 1st Prize, 1948 & 1949, Santa Monica, CA
- Hawthorne Methodist Church Grand Award, Hawthorne, CA
- Deluca Award, Las Vegas, NV
- Inglewood Art League, 1st Award, Inglewood, CA
- California State Fair, Honorable Mention Award
- Riverside Art Ass'n, 3rd Award, 1966, Riverside, CA
- Downey Museum of Art, Honorable Mention Award, 1969
- City of Avalon Best of Show, 1967, Avalon, CA (see image)
- John Marin Memorial Award, Watercolor USA, 1971
- St. Raymonds, 1st Prize, 1971, Thousand Oaks, CA
- Hawthorne Art Festival, 2nd Award, 1971, Hawthorne, CA
- National Watercolor Society Arches Paper Award, 1971
- Inglewood Art League, 1st Award, 1970, Inglewood, CA
- Hawthorne Art Festival, 1st Award, 1970, Hawthorne, CA
- San Bernardino Art Ass'n, 2nd Award, San Bernardino, CA
- Catalina Art Ass'n, Honorable Mention Award, 1967
- Catalina Art Ass'n, 3rd Award, 1968
- California State Fair, Honorable Mention Award, 1966, Sacramento, CA
- Frye Museum, Honorable Mention Award, 1963, Seattle, WA
- Inglewood Art League, Best of Show, 1969
- Arizona State Fair, Honorable Mention Award, 1973
- Arizona State Fair, Cash Award, 1974
- Arizona State Fair, Public Appeal Award, 1980
- Arizona State Fair, 1st Place Cash Award, 1984
- Arizona State Fair, Honorable Mention Award (WC), 1986
- Coconino County Fair, 1st Prize, 1973 & 1974
- National Watercolor Society, Laguna Beach Museum of Art Award, 1975
- Jerome Art Center, 1st Prize WC, 1985
- Best of Show, WC, 1985, Winslow, AZ
- 1st Place, Oil, 1985, Winslow, AZ
- 1st Place, WC, 1985, Winslow, AZ
- Honorable Mention Award, Oil, Winslow, AZ

== Permanent collections ==
- Butler Institute of American Art, Oil
- San Diego Art Museum, Watercolor
- National Watercolor Society, purchase, Motion Picture Art Director
- Newport High School
- Las Vegas Art Association, Nevada Power and Electric
- Glendale Federal Savings and Loan, Glendale, Ca
- Brussels, Belgium, Page J. Thibodeaux
- Washburn School
- Coventry Cathedral, Coventry, England, Oil
- St. Luke's Episcopal Church, Sedona, AZ, Oil
- Sedona High School
- Sedona Chamber of Commerce
- Many Private Collections

== Exhibited ==
- Los Angeles Museum — 1947–1950, 1952, 1954–1955, 1957, and 1958
- Denver Museum — 1953, 1954, and 1960
- Pennsylvania Academy of the Fine Arts — 1957, 1969, and 1970
- The Butler Institute of American Art — 1953, 1955, 1957–1959, 1964, 1967–1971, 1975–1978, 1980–1985
- Oakland Art Museum — 1949, 1950, 1952, 1957, 1966, and 1967
- San Diego Art Museum — 1954
- Watercolor USA — 1966, 1968–1973, and 1975
- University of Washington — 1954
- Hawthorne Art Festival — 1967–1969, and 1971
- National Watercolor Society — 1954, 1956–1976, 1980, 1982–1985
- DeYoung Museum — 1962
- Los Angeles Art Association — 1946, 1949, 1951, and 1953
- Frye Museum — 1958, 1959, 1961–1965
- Newport High School — 1953–1957, 1959–1961
- American Artist Galleries — 1949
- National Orange Show — 1947, 1949, 1952, 1956, 1957, 1964, 1966, and 1967
- Arizona State Fair — 1948, 1973–1977, 1980–1986
- John Ringling Museum — 1959 and 1960
- Long Beach Museum — 1959, 1960, and 1962
- San Francisco Art Association — 1959
- Dulin Gallery of Art — 1964
- Virginia Museum — 1958 and 1962
- Las Vegas Art Association — 1959, 1963, 1965, and 1968
- Pasadena Museum — 1954, 1955, 1957, 1959, and 1961
- Palos Verdes Art Gallery — 1958 and 1969
- Henry Gallery — 1954
- Richmond Art Gallery — 1958–1969, and 1963
- Pacific Art Festival — 1949
- California Palace of the Legion of Honor — 1955–1957, 1959, and 1961
- Wichita Kansas Centennial — 1970
- St. Raymonds, Thousand Oaks, California — 1970
- Tucson Art Museum — 1964
- Los Angeles Miracle Mile — 1965, 1966–1968
- Los Angeles Municipal Art Gallery — 1946–1948, and 1950
- California State Fair — 1951, 1955–1958, 1962, 1966, 1968, and 1970
- Inglewood Art League — 1961–1969
- Riverside Art Association — 1966 and 1971
- Riverside National Date Festival Exhibit — 1966
- Santa Monica Art Association — 1949 and 1958
- Downey Museum of Art — 1969
- Los Angeles City Art Festival — 1965–1971
- Catalina Art Association — 1966–1971
- Cerritos College — 1967
- La Mirada Art Association — 1967 and 1968
- Laguna Beach Art Show — 1969
- Los Angeles Home Show — 1967 and 1978
- Mainstreams (Marietta, Ohio) — 1968
- Glendale Fine Arts Center (Glendale AZ) — 1984 and 1985
- Sedona Arts Center (Sedona AZ) — 1981 and 1986
- Winslow, AZ — 1985 and 1986
- Jerome Art Center (Jerome AZ) — 1986
- Santa Paula — 1958, 1961–1963, 1967, 1968, and 1970
- Grand Canyon Diorama, Disneyland — 1958–present

== Quotations ==
=== Quotes by Yoakum ===
Painting became my life. If I had to do it all over again, I'd do the same thing, but I'd be better at it.

I paint for myself. I hope people like what I do, and if it can give them some happiness and enjoyment, I feel it's all been worthwhile.

=== Quotes referring to Yoakum ===
[Del Yoakum] seeks to express the spiritual qualities which link the personal with the universal.

— Les Krantz, American Artists

It is not difficult to convince anyone that [Del Yoakum's] work will meet the test of time.

— Isabel McCord Stroud, Sedona Heritage: Arizona Artists

[The Disneyland Railroad Grand Canyon Diorama] was painted under the supervision of seasoned Hollywood scenic painter, Delmer Yoakum. Del and his artists used over 300 gallons of paint in 14 colors to complete the realistic depiction of a day in the life of the Grand Canyon. Del was an inspired choice for this job, he was famous for his paintings of desert landscapes.

— Lucas O. Seastrom, Welcome to the Disneyland Railroad Grand Canyon Diorama Tribute!!
