= Günther C. Kirchberger =

German painter

Günther C. Kirchberger (22 August 1928; Kornwestheim – 5 April 2010; Göppingen) was a German painter and professor. He was a Hard Edge painter and a close friend to Lawrence Alloway. Together with Georg Karl Pfahler Kirchberger was the founder of the gruppe 11.

== Life ==
Kirchberger studied at the State Academy of Fine Arts Stuttgart from 1950-1954 where he came in close contact with abstract painter Willi Baumeister. In 1956 he went to London and became friends with Lawrence Alloway, Denis Bowen and Ralph Rumney. Back in Stuttgart, he founded gruppe 11 (group 11) together with Georg Karl Pfahler. The group had exhibitions in Munich, Brussel, Rome and London in 1957-59. In 1959 his art shifted from Art informel to color forms. In 1960 he comes in contact with the philosopher Max Bense and his circle, and 1964 he finally becomes a pure Hard Edge painter. Since 1964 he taught at the Werkkunstschule (School of Applied Arts) in Krefeld and began working with so called do-it-yourself paintings. One of his students was the later star photographer Peter Lindbergh. Since 1996 Kirchberger lived in Bad Boll, near Göppingen. He died in Göppingen in 2010. His estate is located at Schloss Filseck near Göppingen, where The G.C. Kirchberger Archives (Supported by The Schloss Filseck Foundation) began his work in 2017.

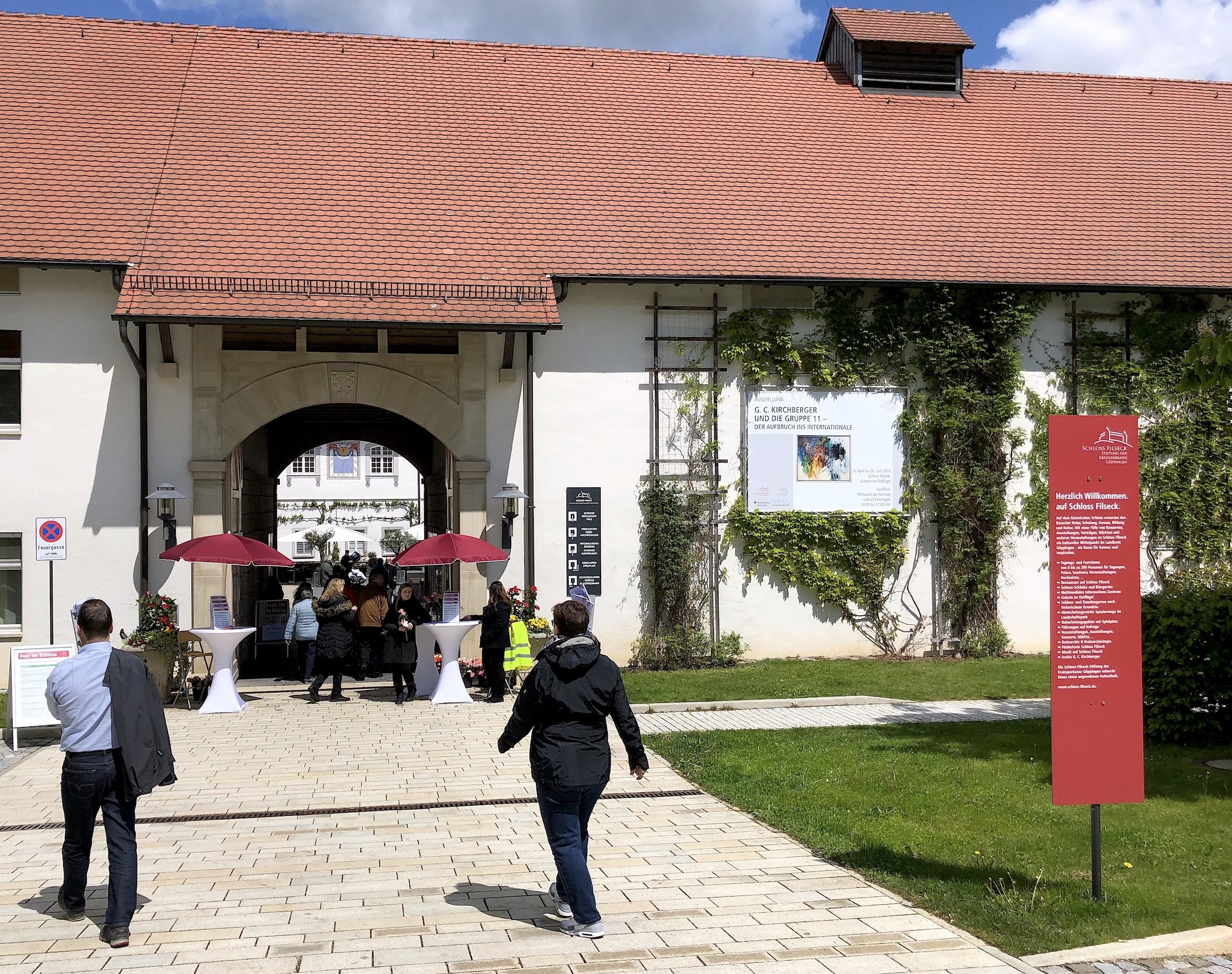
Schloss Filseck Foundation

== Literature ==
- Stephan Geiger: Der kühne Vorstoß ins Internationale – zum Werk des Stuttgarter Avantgardisten Günther C. Kirchberger. In: freie geste – strenge form. günther c. kirchberger zum 80. geburtstag. Ausst.-Kat. Singen 2008, S. 5-106.
- Irmgard Sedler (Hrsg.): Günther C. Kirchberger – IM FOKUS, Stadt Kornwestheim, Museum im Kleihues-Bau 2013, ISBN 978-3-9816175-2-8.
- Stephan Geiger: Günther C. Kirchberger – Eine Schlüsselfigur der Stuttgarter Avantgarde (Heft 1 Schriftenreihe des Archivs G.C. Kirchberger), Galerie im Ostflügel, Schloss Filseck 2018, ISBN 978-3-9819931-0-3.
- Stephan Geiger: Günther C. Kirchberger und die gruppe 11 – Der Aufbruch ins Internationale (Heft 2 Schriftenreihe des Archivs G.C. Kirchberger), Galerie im Ostflügel, Schloss Filseck 2018, ISBN 978-3-9819931-1-0.
