= Shirley Silvey =

American animator

- Born: December 5, 1927
- Died: July 17, 2010 (aged 82); Fresno, California
- Known for: Hand drawn animation

Shirley Silvey (December 5, 1927 – July 17, 2010) was an American animator, whose credits included Mr. Magoo, The Rocky and Bullwinkle Show, Dudley Do-Right Show and George of the Jungle. Silvey was considered a pioneer in animation, as she was one of the first women to work in the field.

== Career ==
Silvey graduated from Jepson Art Institute in Los Angeles. She began her career at United Productions of America (UPA) during the late 1950s. A friend had suggested that she approach cartoon director Ed Levitt for a job at UPA, since he was looking for beginning animators and was also an alumna of Jepson Art Institute. Levitt hired Silvey when he joined UPA, where she first worked in layout, storyboard and character design. Her credits at UPA included Mister Magoo's Christmas Carol, 1001 Arabian Nights and The Gerald McBoing-Boing Show.

Silvey moved to Jay Ward Productions in 1959. She worked with Jay Ward on numerous animated cartoons, including The Rocky and Bullwinkle Show, George of the Jungle, Fractured Fairy Tales, Dudley Do-Right and the Cap'n Crunch television commercials. Silvey remained at Jay Ward Productions until 1973. She also briefly worked on Bugs Bunny cartoons at Warner Bros.

== Death ==
Shirley Silvey died of heart failure on July 17, 2010, in Fresno, California, at the age of 82. She was survived by a daughter, two grandchildren and her brother, storyboard and design artist David Jonas.
