= Travis Somerville =

Travis Somerville (born 1963) is an American artist based in San Francisco, California. Known for tackling Southern racial issues, Somerville’s works incorporate collage painting and sculptural elements, as well as site-specific installations.

== Early life and education ==
Somerville was born in Atlanta, Georgia in 1963. His parents, both European American, were civil rights activists, his father worked as an Episcopal preacher and his mother was a schoolteacher. Somerville grew up in various cities and rural towns throughout the Southern United States. He briefly studied at Maryland Institute College of Art (MICA), Baltimore, Maryland, finally settling in San Francisco in 1984 where he attended the San Francisco Art Institute (SFAI).

== Work ==
Somerville’s work simultaneously tries to reconcile his personal struggle with his own Southern Christian upbringing and the overt tumultuous racial politics of then with the mixed messaging backlash of now. Using collaged and painted pictorial elements, he summons imagery and words from the history, politics, popular culture, and fine art into juxtapositions that challenge conventional lines of history and social perceptions. For example, his piece, Boy in the Hood, 2000, portrays Malcolm X wearing a Ku Klux Klan hood. In an interview with Nathan Larramendy, Somerville stated, “My southern identity will always play a part in my work because that is who I am... I feel the overall theme [of my work] is oppression and greed. I want the oppressed to be validated and the oppressors to be guilty. I want people to realize that we are all connected in some way and we are responsible for each other.”

== Awards ==
- 2000 The Art Council Grant
- Artist in Residence, University of Houston–Clear Lake — Houston, Texas (USA)
- 2010 – Painters & Sculptors Grant recipient, Joan Mitchell Foundation
- 2018 – Artist in Residence (served in 2018, awarded in 2016), Joan Mitchell Foundation

== Public collections ==
- 21c Museum hotels, Louisville, Kentucky
- The Achenbach Collection of the Fine Arts Museums of San Francisco (FAMSF), San Francisco, California
- di Rosa, Napa, California
- Laguna Art Museum, Laguna Beach, California
- Progressive Art Collection, Mayfield Village, Ohio
- San Jose Museum of Art, San Jose, California
- Walker Art Center, Minneapolis, Minnesota
- San Francisco Museum of Modern Art, San Francisco, California

== Select solo exhibitions ==
- 2010 Museum of Contemporary Art, Boulder, Colorado
- 2009 Dedicated to the Proposition, Ben Maltz Gallery, Otis College of Art and Design, Los Angeles, California
- 2008 Authentic Facsimiles of a Nation, Caren Golden Fine Art Gallery, New York, New York
- 2007 The Great American Let Down, Overtones Gallery, Los Angeles, California
- 2006 American Cracker Too, Alfred C. Glassell Jr. Exhibition Gallery, Louisiana State University, Baton Rouge, Louisiana
  American Cracker, Catharine Clark Gallery, San Francisco, California
  Peckerwood Nation, Nathan Larramendy Gallery, Ojai, California
- 2004 More Songs of the South, Nathan Larramendy Gallery, Ojai, California
- 2003 More Songs of the South, Catharine Clark Gallery, San Francisco, California (catalogue)
- 2002 Another Song of the South, University of Georgia, Athens, Georgia
- 2000 Song of the South, Catharine Clark Gallery, San Francisco, California
  Travis Somerville: New Work, University of Houston-Clear Lake, Houston, Texas (catalogue)
- 1998 The Land of Cotton, Catharine Clark Gallery, San Francisco, California
- 1996 I’ve Never Been to Aceldama: New Work (125th San Francisco Art Institute Anniversary Exhibit), Catharine Clark Gallery, San Francisco, California
- 1994 Introductions, Morphos Gallery, San Francisco, California
- 1993 Travis Somerville, Mace, San Francisco, California
- 1992 Travis Somerville, Mace, San Francisco, California
- 1991 Travis Somerville, Mace, San Francisco, California
  Travis Somerville, Show N Tell, San Francisco, California
- 1990 Travis Somerville, Mace, San Francisco, California
- 1989 Travis Somerville, 1078 Gallery, Chico, California
  Travis Somerville, Show N Tell, San Francisco, California
