= Muckenthaler House =

Historic house in California, United States

Muckenthaler Cultural Center
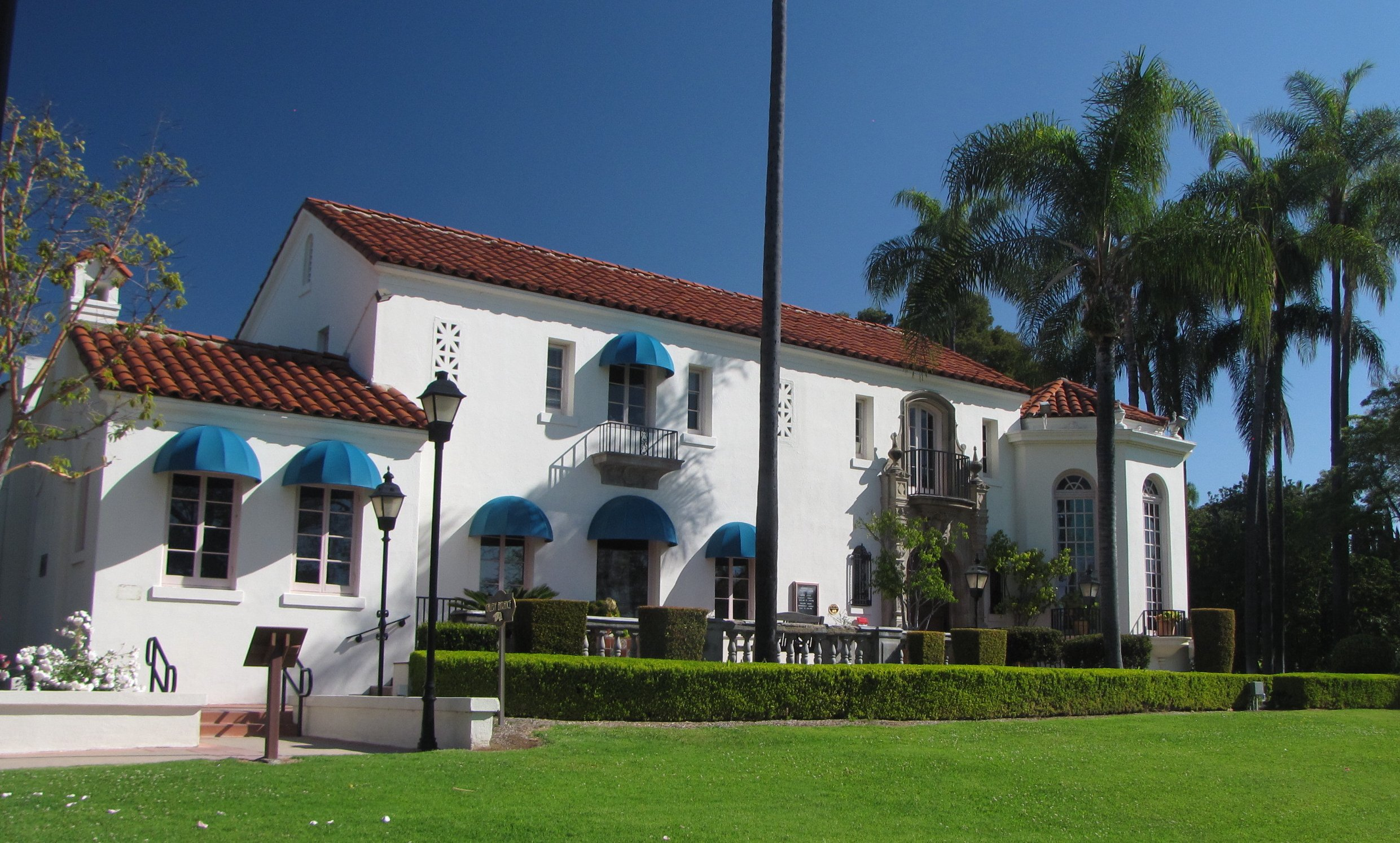
- Interactive map of Muckenthaler Cultural Center
- Address: 1201 W. Malvern Avenue
- Location: Fullerton, California
- Owner: City of Fullerton (operated by the Muckenthaler Cultural Center Foundation)
- Type: Cultural center

Construction
- Built: 1925

Website
- themuck.org
- Muckenthaler House
- U.S. National Register of Historic Places
- Location within California Location within the United States
- Coordinates: 33°52′33″N 117°56′35″W
- Area: 8.5 acres (3.4 ha)
- Architect: Benchley, Frank; Herbert, E.J.
- Architectural style: Spanish Colonial Revival, & Late 19th And 20th Century Revivals
- NRHP reference No.: 80000829
- Added to NRHP: May 31, 1980

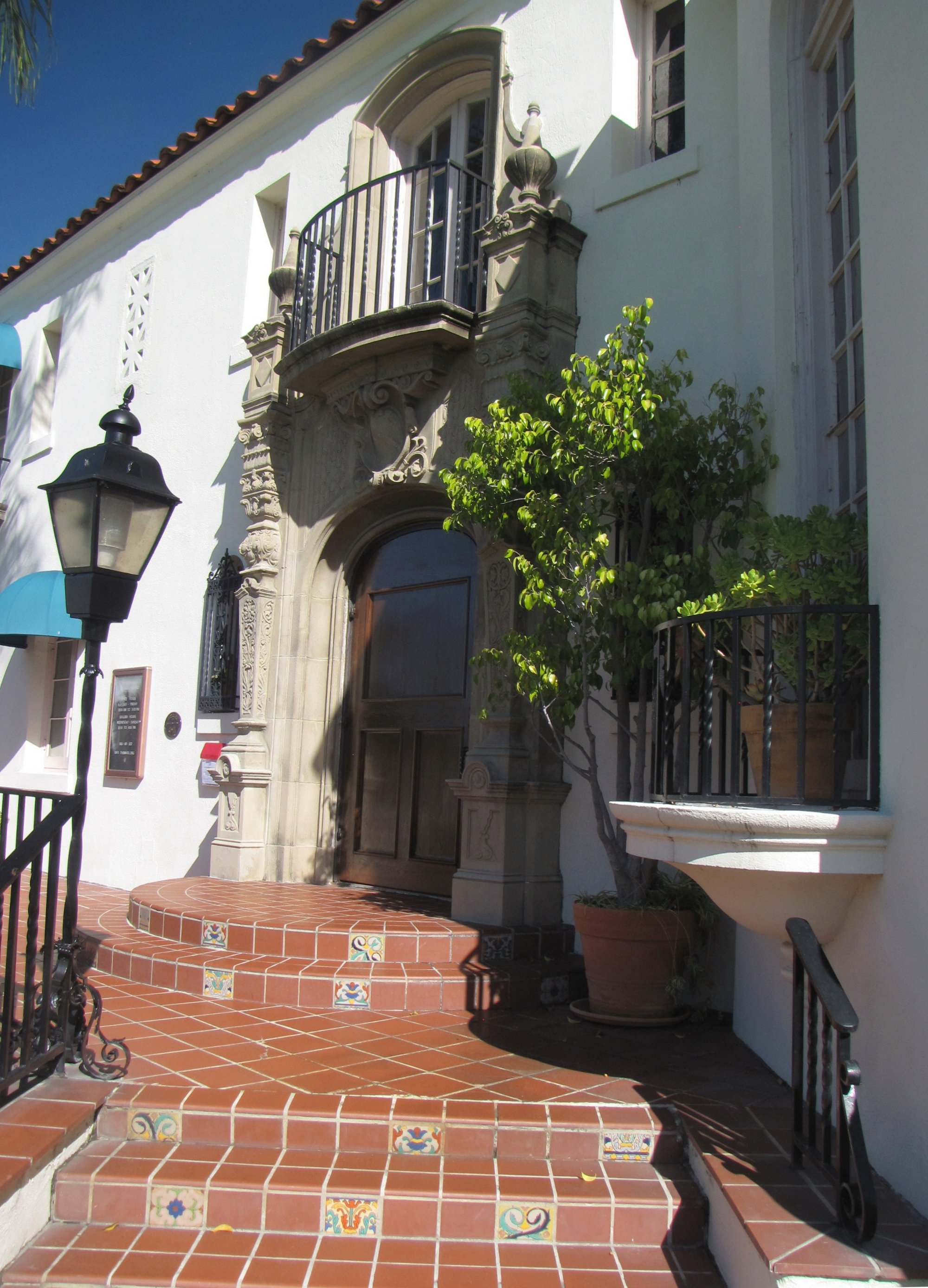

The Muckenthaler House, renamed the Muckenthaler Cultural Center, is a large Spanish Colonial Revival style residence built in Fullerton, California, in 1925.

== Mission ==
The mission of the Muckenthaler Cultural Center is to conserve the heritage of the Muckenthaler estate while offering exhibitions, performances and stimulating educational programs.

== History ==
Commissioned at an original cost of $35,000, the Muckenthaler home was built by Walter and Adella Muckenthaler in 1925 atop a hill in Fullerton. The 18-room mansion on 8.5 acres was donated to the city in 1965 by Harold Muckenthaler, who wished to see his childhood home used as a cultural center. In 1999, the Muckenthaler House / Muckenthaler Cultural Center received designation by the National Register of Historic Places.

== Timeline ==
- In 1965, the Muckenthalers donated the home and grounds to the City of Fullerton with the condition that it be developed into a cultural center.
- In 1966, The Cultural Groups Foundation of Northern Orange County was founded as a nonprofit organization to work with the City in operating the center.
- In 1967, The Center Circle Guild was founded to provide additional support and volunteers for the programs of the center. They also ran the gift shop, sponsored the annual Florence Arnold Young Artists Festival, the Holiday Home Tour, and support exhibition related and education programs.
- In 1980, The National Register of Historic Places recognized the Muckenthaler home as a historic site.
- A complete renovation of the site took place from 1981 to 1984.
- 1984, saw the creation of the first Master Plan outlining the future of the Muckenthaler.
- 1990–1993, held the construction of a new outdoor amphitheatre.
- In 1990, the Foundation changed names to the Muckenthaler Cultural Center Foundation.
- In 1994, the Muckenthaler changed hands with the foundation managing the center and the grounds. The Jane Deming Endowment was established to promote, preserve and assist the Foundation in its mission.

== Architecture and gardens ==
Residence

- The wrought iron staircase railing in the home's entry was imported from Italy.
- The tiles that surround the fireplaces and cover the solarium floor were designed by the Ernest Batchelder Tile Company.
- The library and conservatory decor features period furniture including several heirloom pieces from the Muckenthaler family.
- Gallery in the mansion with art from around the world with shows changing quarterly.

Gardens

- Nine acre property: wooded knoll, many trees & palms, gently sloping and large flat event lawns, and a rose garden.
- Outdoor amphitheater with built-in seating.
- Stone Gazebo at original citrus grove reservoir.
- Italian Garden surrounded by palms, with iron gazebo.
- Center Circle Patio is accented with decorative lights.
- Sculpture Garden throughout the property
- Sunset Garden on western edge consists of drought resistant wildflowers and grasses

== See also ==
- National Register of Historic Places listings in Orange County, California
