= Gabriele Evertz =

German-American painter (born 1945)

- Born: Berlin, Germany
- Known for: Abstract color painting
- Style: Geometric abstraction
- Website: www.gabrieleevertz.com

Gabriele Evertz (born 1945 in Berlin, Germany) is an American painter, curator and professor who is applying the history and theory of color in her work. She is known for abstract color painting and Geometric abstraction.

== Life and work ==
Gabriele Evertz emigrated to the United States at the age of 19. She holds an M.F.A. in painting and a B.A. in art history, both from Hunter College, where she has taught since 1998. She is a member of the American Abstract Artists. Evertz lives and works in New York. In 2012, she received the Basil H. Alkazzi Award for Excellence in Painting.

Evertz is considered a longtime member of the Hunter Color School, along with Doug Ohlson, Robert Swain, Vincent Longo, Joanna Pousette-Dart, and Sanford Wurmfeld. Although all artists have found their own individual means of expression, they are united in their exploration of the phenomenology of color in order to initiate a transformative effect on the viewer.

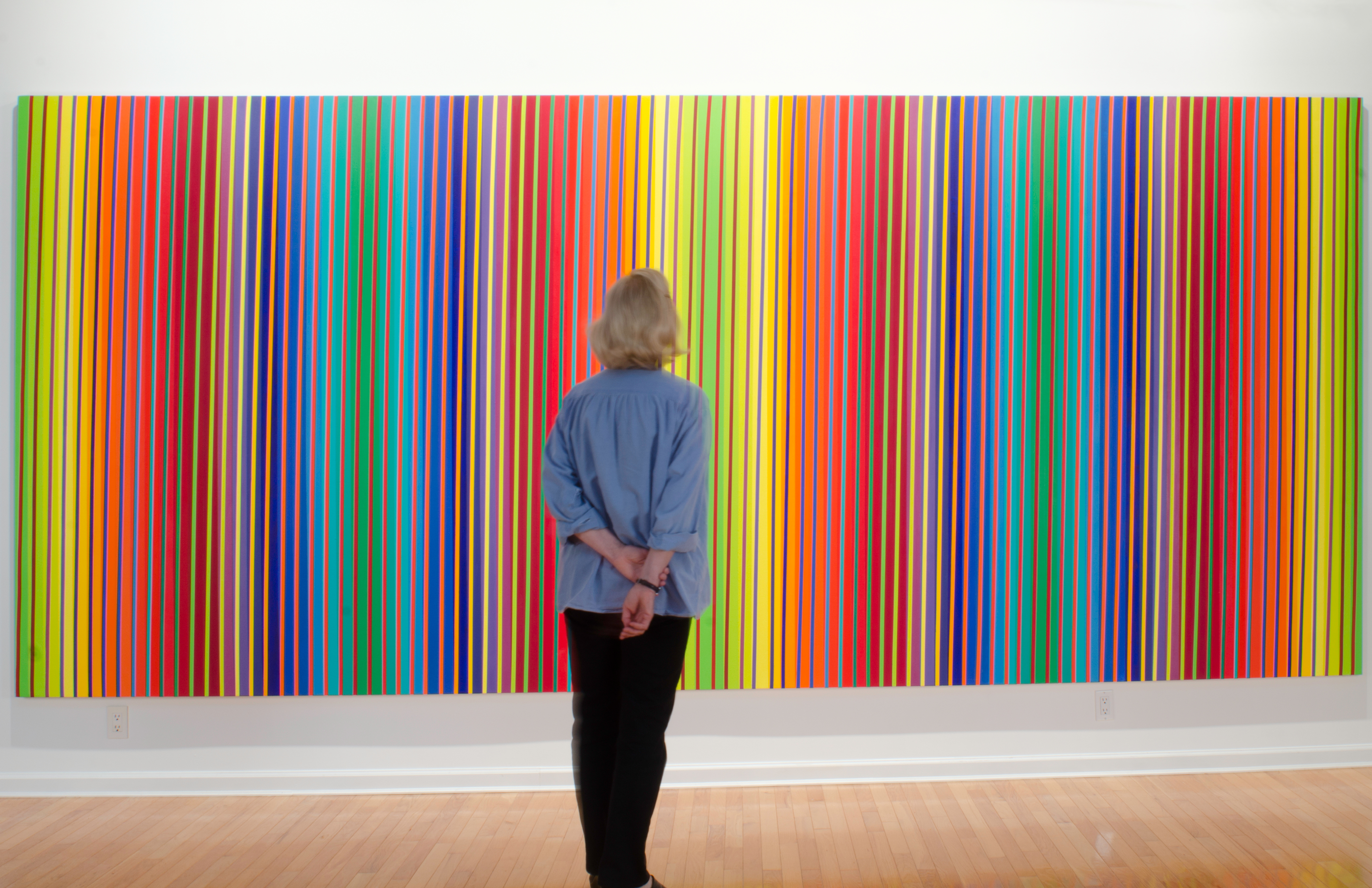
Gabriele Evertz in front of her work Double, 1999, acrylic on canvas

== Work ==
Color to me is the most important problem, it's a pioneering problem, it's a very new experience to not tell a story, not make the color the burden of a symbolic meaning. Just perceive and understand, what the sensation is of color. Intense colors give me that sense of aliveness.

— Gabriele Evertz, Video Gabriele Evertz documentary, 2010

Evertz's paintings consist of vertical lines, for which she uses all colors of the color circle. In her latest compositions she turns to the color grey and its effects on surrounding colors. Occasionally, she also uses metallic colors, as these can reflect the light and set additional color impulses. She often repeats certain color constellations within an artwork.

While viewing the painting, the mind's eye constantly swings between perceiving the entire picture and the concentration on individual aspects of the work. The viewer thus perceives a kind of vibration of the color: The resulting paintings present a barrage of visual information that moves color and form in and out of sequence and symmetry causing the eye to move through undulating, pulsating spaces. This becomes particularly evident when the viewer takes different distances from the picture. The resulting parallax intensifies the experience of the vibration and oscillation of the color.

Without the viewer the painting doesn't exist. The viewer brings the painting to life.

— Gabriele Evertz, Video Gabriele Evertz documentary, 2010

It is solely through the viewers' perception of the composition, through their movement in the room and the resulting different perception of closeness and distance, that oscillation and vibration arise, which turns the viewing of the works into an individual and possibly even spiritual experience: "People think geometry is very static, but it isn't. It's moving all the time. I'm keeping the same color sequence but changing the background. so as you engage in it, it changes. The colors are the actors. These are really vessels of contemplation."

== Videography (selection) ==
- 2010: Michael Feldmann: Gabriele Evertz Paints a Color Study, 09′ 05″
- 2010: Michael Feldmann: Gabriele Evertz Documentary, 03′ 21″
- 2016: Macbamuseo: Geometric Obsession. American School 1965–2015 01′ 54″

== Works in collections (selection) ==
- Columbus Museum of Art, Ohio
- Museum of Fine Arts, Boston, Massachusetts
- Brooklyn Museum, New York
- Harvard University Museum, Cambridge, Massachusetts
- Hallmark Collection, Kansas City, Missouri
- Metropolitan Museum of Art, New York
- Museum of Modern Art, New York
- The New York Public Library, New York
- New Jersey State Museum, Trenton, New Jersey
- The Phillips Collection, Washington, D.C.
- The Princeton University Library, Princeton, New Jersey
- St. Lawrence University Art Museum, Canton, New York
- Whitney Museum of American Art, New York
- The British Museum, London, England
- Osthaus Museum Hagen, Hagen, Germany
- MACBA Museum of Contemporary Art in Buenos Aires, Argentina
- Wilhelm Hack Museum, Ludwigshafen, Germany

== Solo exhibitions (selection) ==
- 2006: LIV, Benton Nyce Gallery, Greenport, New York
- 2011: Gabriele Evertz – Rapture, Minus Space, New York
- 2012: Gabriele Evertz – Optic Drive, David Richard Gallery, Santa Fe, New Mexico
- 2012: Gabriele Evertz – The Geometry of Color, Art Sites Gallery, Riverhead, Suffolk County, New York
- 2015: The Gray Question, Minus Space, New York
- 2017: Gabriele Evertz – Color Relativity, 499 Park Ave Lobby Gallery, New York
- 2018: Flagge zeigen – Gabriele Evertz, Radevormwald, Germany
- 2020: Gabriele Evertz – Exaltation, Minus Space, New York
- 2022: Gabriele Evertz – Path, Minus Space, New York

== Group exhibitions (selection) ==
- 2010: Escape from New York, Massey University, Wellington, New Zealand
- 2010: Escape from New York, Project Space Spare Room, RMIT University, Melbourne, Australia
- 2011: Pointing a Telescope at the Sun, Minus Space, New York
- 2011: American Abstract Artists International, Deutscher Künstlerbund, Berlin, Germany
- 2012: Minus Space, The Suburban Gallery, Chicago, Illinois (with Mark Dagley und Gilbert Hsiao)
- 2012: Buzz, Galeria Nara Roesler, São Paulo, Brazil
- 2012: Seeing Red. A Group Exhibition, David Richard Gallery, Santa Fe, New Mexico
- 2013: Hauptsache Grau, Mies van der Rohe Haus, Berlin, Germany
- 2014: A Global Exchange: Geometric Abstraction Since 1950, The Patricia & Phillip Frost Art Museum, Miami, Florida
- 2014: Doppler Shift, Visual Arts Center of New Jersey, Summit, New Jersey
- 2014: Intervention. Flagge zeigen, Banner Projekt, Radevormwald, Germany
- 2014: Hard Edge Abstraction: Paintings and Works on Paper, St. Lawrence University, Canton, New York
- 2015: Territory of Abstraction, Pentimenti Gallery, Philadelphia, Pennsylvania
- 2015: Breaking Pattern, Minus Space, New York
- 2015: Geometric Obsession. American School 1965–2015, Museum de Arte Contemporaneo Buenos Aires, Buenos Aires, Argentina
- 2015: Op Infinitum: 'The Responsive Eye' Fifty Years After, David Richard Gallery, Santa Fe, New Mexico
- 2016: Painting Color, Glassell Gallery at the Louisiana State University, Baton Rouge, Louisiana
- 2016: Color, Philip Slein Gallery, St. Louis, Missouri
- 2017: Polychromy: Gabriele Evertz and Sanford Wurmfeld, Minus Space, New York
- 2017: Extended Progress, Saturation Point Projects, London, England
- 2018: Radiant Energy, Visual Art Center of New Jersey, Summit, New Jersey
- 2024: Perception and Abstraction, The Terry & David Peak Collection, Utah, Logan, United States

== Curatorial work (selection) ==
- 2003: Seeing Red: Contemporary Nonobjective Painting, (curated together with Michael Fehr) Hunter College/Times Square Gallery, New York
- 2006: Presentational Painting III, Hunter College/Times Square Gallery, New York
- 2009: Color Exchange Berlin-New York, Galerie Parterre, Berlin, Germany (the exhibition travelled later to the gallery Metaphor Contemporary Art), New York
- 2010: Visual Sensations, The Paintings of Robert Swain: 1967–2010, Hunter College/Times Square Gallery, New York
- 2017: Dual Current: Inseparable Elements in Painting and Architecture, University of Tennessee, Knoxville, (later the exhibition travelled to the Murray State University, Murray, Kentucky and to the University of Alabama, Tuscaloosa, Alabama)
