= John McLaughlin (artist) =

American painter (1898–1976)

- John McLaughlin, 1963
- Born: John Dwyer McLaughlin; May 21, 1898; Sharon, Massachusetts, U.S.
- Died: March 22, 1976 (aged 77); Dana Point, California, U.S.
- Known for: Painting
- Movement: Hard-edge painting, Minimalism

John Dwyer McLaughlin (May 21, 1898 – March 22, 1976) was an American abstract painter. Based primarily in California, he was a pioneer in minimalism and hard-edge painting. Considered one of the most significant Californian postwar artists, McLaughlin painted a focused body of geometric works that are completely devoid of any connection to everyday experience and objects, inspired by the Japanese notion of the void. He aimed to create paintings devoid of any object hood including but not limited to a gestures, representations and figuration. This led him to the rectangle. Leveraging a technique of layering rectangular bars on adjacent planes, McLaughlin creates works that provoke introspection and, consequently, a greater understanding of one's relationship to nature.

== Life ==
John McLaughlin was born in Sharon, Massachusetts. His father was a Massachusetts Superior Court judge and he had six siblings. His parents instilled in him an interest in art, most specifically Asian art.

McLaughlin served in both World Wars. His service in the United States Navy during World War I spanned from 1917 to 1921.

In 1928, he married Florence Emerson, a grandniece of Ralph Waldo Emerson. In 1935 they moved to Japan, where McLaughlin studied the art and language. When they returned to Boston in 1938, they opened The Tokaido, Inc., an art gallery which specialized in Japanese prints and other Asian items.

After studying Japanese at the University of Hawaiʻi in Honolulu, he served the United States Marine Corps in World War II as a translator. Later in the war, he worked in U. S. Army Intelligence as a translator in Japan, India, China and Burma. In 1945 he was awarded the Bronze Star Medal for meritorious service.

== Painting career ==
McLaughlin had begun painting during the 1930s, relatively late in life. He was self-taught, without receiving formal artistic training. His fondness for Asian art and his travels in that part of the world influenced his artistic style.

He settled in Dana Point, California in 1946 and began painting full-time.

A few of his earliest paintings were still lifes and landscapes, but the remainder of his pieces were abstracts. During this time period, he was one of just a few American artists creating abstracts. McLaughlin's work is characterized by a simplicity expressed as precise geometric forms, usually rectangles. His experiences in Asia were very important in developing his style. Zen masters taught that spaces between objects (the "marvelous void") could be more important than the objects themselves in facilitating meditation. The work of Kazimir Malevich and Piet Mondrian also strongly influenced McLaughlin. He wrote: "With respect to my direct influences I must stress my interest in 15th and 16th century Japanese painters. I have found comfort in some aspects of thought expressed by Malevitch, and I am indebted to Mondrian because his painting strongly indicated that the natural extension of Neo-Plasticism is the totally abstract."

#17, 1966, oil on canvas, Smithsonian American Art Museum

From 1952 onward, he ceased using curves in his work. Paintings from his later period show increasing simplification of form and color palette.

He described his artistic philosophy: "My purpose is to achieve the totally abstract. I want to communicate only to the extent that the painting will serve to induce or intensify the viewer's natural desire for contemplation without benefit of a guiding principle. I must therefore free the viewer from the demands or special qualities imposed by the particular by omitting the image (object). This I manage by the use of neutral forms."

McLaughlin's first solo exhibition was in 1952 at the Felix Landau Gallery in Los Angeles. He also showed with André Emmerich in New York and Zurich. His many other museum solo exhibition venues included the Pasadena Art Museum, Corcoran Gallery, La Jolla Museum of Contemporary Art, and Whitney Museum of American Art. His work was also included in numerous group exhibitions, including the landmark "Four Abstract Classicists" exhibit at the Los Angeles County Museum of Art. This show, also featuring the work of Karl Benjamin, Lorser Feitelson, and Frederick Hammersley, was organized by Jules Langsner who, along with Peter Selz, coined the term "hard-edge painting" to describe the work of these four abstract artists. Langsner wrote: "Deliberately neutral in character, John McLaughlin's forms might be described as anonymous. Essentially color serves him as a means of defining and regulating a form's relative importance in the composition. Each painting represents the outcome of a process of refinement."

A touring exhibition "Birth of the Cool: California Art, Design and Culture at Midcentury" featured the abstract classicists. The New York Times art critic Ken Johnson wrote in his 2008 review of the show at the Addison Gallery of American Art: "Mr. McLaughlin's grid-based paintings exude a greater formal austerity [than Benjamin's]. They are composed of smooth, flat rectangles of black, white, off-white and gray with blocks of color strategically inserted here and there. Inspired by Asian art and Zen Buddhism, they have a monastic air about them, but they are suave and materially sensuous too."

Life magazine published a special issue in 1962 on the state of California. It highlighted five renowned artists, including John McLaughlin. (The others were Stanton Macdonald-Wright, Robert Irwin, Billy Al Bengston, and Roger Kuntz.)

McLaughlin died on March 22, 1976, in Dana Point at the age of 77.

In 1963, the Pasadena Art Museum (now the Norton Simon Museum) exhibited McLaughlin's first major museum retrospective curated by the legendary Walter Hopps. In 1968, the Corcoran Gallery of Art exhibited McLaughlin's second major museum retrospective curated by James Harithas. In 1975, the Laguna Art Museum held McLaughlin's second museum retrospective.

In Spring 2016, Louis Stern Fine Arts in West Hollywood mounted an exhibition of the Four Abstract Classicists, featuring McLaughlin, Benjamin, Feitelson, and Hammersley, alongside Helen Lundeberg.Later in 2016, McLaughlin was subject to a long overdue third major museum retrospective at LACMA. A review of the show by art critic Christopher Knight affirms "McLaughlin occupies the top tier of 20th century American art".

== Collections ==
A few of the major collections containing McLaughlin's work:

- Addison Gallery of American Art, Andover, Massachusetts
- Albright-Knox Art Gallery, Buffalo, New York
- Corcoran Gallery of Art, Washington D.C.
- Los Angeles County Museum of Art, Los Angeles, California
- Long Beach Museum of Art, Long Beach, California
- McNay Art Museum, San Antonio, Texas
- Metropolitan Museum of Art, New York, New York
- Museum of Contemporary Art, Los Angeles, California
- Museum of Modern Art, New York, New York
- Perez Art Museum Miami, Florida (former Miami Art Museum)
- San Diego Museum of Art, San Diego, California
- San Francisco Museum of Modern Art, San Francisco, California
- Santa Barbara Museum of Art, Santa Barbara, California
- Smithsonian American Art Museum, Washington, D.C.
- Wadsworth Atheneum, Hartford, Connecticut
- Whitney Museum of American Art, New York, New York
