= Robert Swain (artist) =

American painter

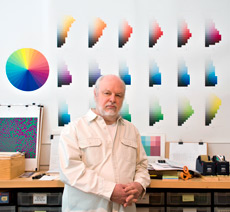
Robert Swain

Robert Swain (born December 7, 1940) is an American artist working in the field of Color Sensation.

== Early life and education ==
Robert Swain was born on December 7, 1940, in Austin, Texas and grew up in Arlington, Virginia. As a teenager he was influenced by the art in the Washington, D.C. National Gallery of Art, specifically Raphael, Rembrandt, and Vermeer. From 1956 to 1957 Swain traveled and worked in Central American on the Pan-American Highway, and from 1961 to 1962 he lived and studied at the University of Madrid, Spain as part of his undergraduate studies.

In 1964 Swain received his BA degree from the American University in Washington, D.C.

== Career ==
Living and working in New York City Swain is a longtime member of the "Hunter Color School", along with Doug Ohson, Gabriele Evertz, Vincent Longo, Joanna Pousette-Dart, and Sanford Wurmfeld.

Swain is the recipient of a grant for painting from the John Simon Guggenheim Foundation in 1969, a CAPS Grant (painting), from the State of New York, in 1982, and two Grants from the National Endowment for the Arts (painting); the first in 1976, and again in 1989. Teaching at Hunter College from 1968 to 2014 Swain was awarded the Distinguished Teaching Art Award from the College Art Association in February 1998. He has given numerous Visiting Artist lectures, served on various Fine Art Juries and participated in many panel discussions, such as the Artist's Panel at The Museum of Modern Art, entitled Tony Smith: Artists’ Responses (1998) and, Seeing Red, Part III: Color as an Experience: A Two- Day Symposium on Contemporary Nonobjective Painting and Color Theory, at the Goethe–Institute Inter Nationes, New York (2003). Robert Swain is also a member of American Abstract Artists.

== Major exhibitions ==
Swain's work has been included in group shows at The Museum of Modern Art, The Corcoran Gallery of Art, The Whitney Museum, and The Metropolitan Museum of Art. In 2010 a major exhibition of his work, entitled Visual Sensations, The Paintings of Robert Swain: 1967 – 2010, was held at the Hunter College / Times Square Gallery, curated by Gabriele Evertz.

== Public collections ==
Swain's artwork is represented The Albright-Knox Art Gallery, Walker Art Center, The Corcoran Gallery of Art, The Denver Art Museum, The Milwaukee Art Center, The Detroit Institute of Art, The Everson Art Museum, The Columbus Gallery of Fine Arts, and the Metropolitan Museum of Art. 2012

== Publications ==
- Visual Sensations, The Paintings of Robert Swain: 1967-2010. Catalogue.
- Modern Art in America 1908-68. Phaidon, 2016. William C. Agee. ISBN 9780714869346.
