= Karl Benjamin =

American painter (1925 - 2012)

- Born: December 29, 1925; Chicago
- Died: July 26, 2012 (aged 86)
- Known for: oil painting
- Movement: Abstract Expressionism; Hard-edge painting
- Spouse: Beverly Jean Paschke

Karl Stanley Benjamin (December 29, 1925 – July 26, 2012) was an American painter of vibrant geometric abstractions, who rose to fame in 1959 as one of four Los Angeles–based Abstract Classicists and subsequently produced a critically acclaimed body of work that explores a vast array of color relationships. Working quietly at his home in Claremont, California, he developed a rich vocabulary of colors and hard-edge shapes in masterful compositions of tightly balanced repose or high-spirited energy. At once intuitive and systematic, the artist was, in the words of critic Christopher Knight, "a colorist of great wit and inventiveness."

== Early life ==
Benjamin was born in Chicago in 1925. He enrolled at Northwestern University in 1943, but dropped out to join the U.S. Navy during World War II. In 1946, after three years of military service, he moved to California to study English literature, history, and philosophy at the University of Redlands with the help of the G.I. Bill. He received a B.A. degree and California teaching credentials in 1949.

With no formal education in art and no thought of becoming an artist, Benjamin married Beverly Jean Paschke, and began teaching in an elementary school in Bloomington, California, in 1949. He started a family (daughters Beth Marie and Kris Ellen and son Bruce Lincoln), moved to Claremont in 1952, and subsequently taught in Chino for the next 30 years.

== Artistic development ==
Benjamin's interest in art emerged serendipitously. Asked to develop art lessons for his students' curriculum, he began working with crayons and became fascinated with the phenomenon of how colors can appear to change when juxtaposed with others. Eager to learn more, he took classes at the Claremont Graduate School (now Claremont Graduate University) and received an M.A. degree in 1960. By then, he was a serious painter and color was his subject matter.

In 1954, he had his first major solo show, at the Pasadena Art Museum, now the Norton Simon Museum of Art.

== The "Four Abstract Classicists" exhibition ==
Multi Triangles (Untitled # 26) by Karl Benjamin, 1969, Honolulu Museum of Art

Benjamin had early success in Southern California, showing his work in museums and community galleries, but the event that put his work under a national spotlight and gave him a lasting label was "Four Abstract Classicists". Also featuring the work of Lorser Feitelson, John McLaughlin and Frederick Hammersley, the 1959–60 exhibition was viewed as Los Angeles' answer to Abstract Expressionism. The West Coast artists' crisp abstractions offered a bracingly cool alternative to New York's emotion and action-packed style.

The exhibition was organized by critic Jules Langsner, and opened at the San Francisco Museum of Art, (now the San Francisco Museum of Modern Art) then traveled to the Los Angeles County Museum at Exposition Park (now the Los Angeles County Museum of Art). Renamed "West Coast Hard-Edge," the revised version later traveled to the Institute of Contemporary Art in London and Queen's University in Belfast, Northern Ireland.

In the exhibition catalog, Langsner described Abstract Classicist painting as "Hard-edge painting" in which "color and shape are one and the same entity. Form gains its existence through color, and color its being through form." Of Benjamin's work, he wrote: "The elongated forms in the Karl Benjamin paintings interlock in a continuous composition that seems to be without beginning or end. Whenever one of these zigzag shapes appears to overlap an adjacent zigzag, it tucks itself back in somewhere else."

"Four Abstract Classicists reveals, in retrospect, not merely four senior moderns who reduced their painting to precise, flat profundities, but a current of sensibility in the esthetic climate of Los Angeles," critic Peter Plagens wrote in 1974. As he saw it, the hard-edge style rose from Los Angeles' "desert air, youthful cleanliness, spatial expanse, architectural tradition" and an optimistic belief in a refined, spiritually charged art that could fulfill human needs for visual and intellectual pleasure. Multi Triangles (Untitled # 26) from 1969, in the collection of the Honolulu Museum of Art, demonstrates the artist's hard-edge painting style applied to strict geometric abstraction.

== Later life ==
Benjamin continued teaching in public elementary and middle schools until 1977, balancing his time in the classroom with work in his studio. He had a second teaching career from 1979 to 1994, when he was a professor and artist-in-residence at Pomona College in Claremont and taught classes at the Claremont Graduate School. He won National Endowment for the Arts grants in 1983 and 1989.

Like many artists with long careers, Benjamin was often overlooked in his later years, but he re-emerged with a burst of exhibitions and critical acclaim. Louis Stern Fine Arts presented exhibitions of his paintings in 2004, 2005, 2007, and 2011, and posthumously in 2014, 2017, and 2019. The Claremont Museum of Art launched its exhibition program in 2007 with a 42-year survey of his work. Benjamin also had a prominent place in "Birth of the Cool: California Art, Design and Culture at Mid-Century," a 2007-09 national traveling show organized by the Orange County Museum of Art.

Dave Hickey wrote in the catalog, for Benjamin's 2007 exhibition at Louis Stern:

I can think of no other artist whose paintings exude the joy and pleasure of being an artist with more intensity than Karl Benjamin's nor any other artist whose long teaching career has left no blemish of cynicism on his practice.

Shortly before Benjamin's death, artist David P. Flores planned a large portrait mural for the City of Pomona with Benjamin's approval. The 140' x 40' mural was completed shortly thereafter in 2012.

== Sources ==
1. Knight, Christopher, "The Beauty of Geometry," Los Angeles Times, June 5, 2007, part E, p. 3.
2. Langsner, Jules, "Four Abstract Classicists," Los Angeles County Museum, 1959, pp. 10–11.
3. Plagens, Peter, "Sunshine Muse: Art on the West Coast, 1945-1970," University of California Press, 1974, p. 119-120.
4. Hickey, Dave, "Dance the Line: Paintings by Karl Benjamin," exhibition catalog, Louis Stern Fine Arts, West Hollywood, 2007.
5. Karabenick, Julie, "Interview with Artist Karl Benjamin," on GEOFORM, 2008
