= Sanford Wurmfeld =

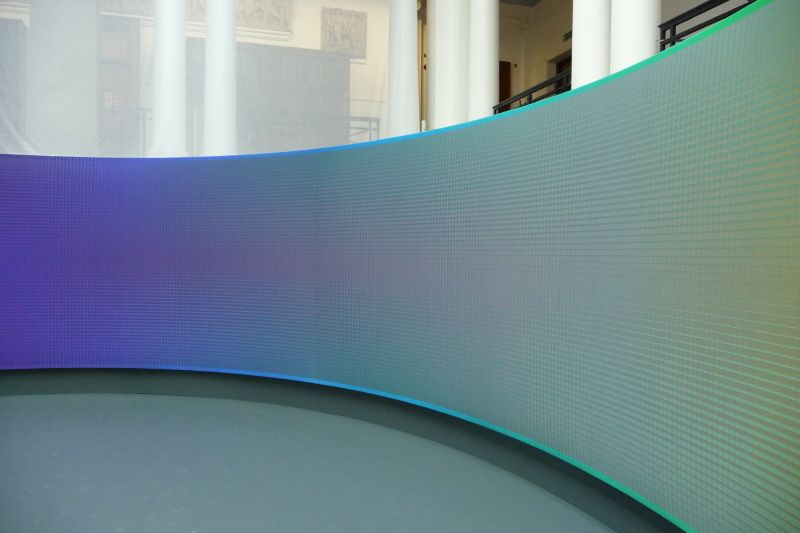
- A view from within E-Cyclorama, an installation by Sanford Wurmfeld, 2008.
- Known for: abstract painting
- Website: sanfordwurmfeld.com

Sanford Wurmfeld (born December 6, 1942) is an American abstract painter. His large-scale works investigate the impact of color on mood and perception using shifts of hue and tone across grids.

== Early life and career ==
Wurmfeld was born in the Bronx, New York. He was the Hunter College Art Department Chair from 1978 to 2006, and holds the title of Phyllis and Joseph Caroff Professor of Fine Arts Emeritus. He received a Guggenheim Foundation Fellowship in 1974.

== Exhibitions and collections ==
Wurmfeld began exhibiting in the mid-1960s. His paintings have been shown in a range of solo and group shows, including at the Museum of Modern Art, the Neuburger Museum of Art, Art Basel, Minus Space, and Karl Ernst Osthaus-Museum. Museums that hold his works in their permanent collections include the Metropolitan Museum of Art and the Brooklyn Museum.

== Influences and impact ==
Wurmfeld's influences include Georges Seurat, Josef Albers, Claude Monet, and Mark Rothko. His work is associated with hard-edge painting and color field painting. He is considered a founding member of the Hunter Color School with Gabriele Evertz.
