= Jules Langsner =

American art critic and psychiatrist

Jules Langsner (1911—1967) was an American art critic and psychiatric social worker. Born in New York City in 1911 and died in 1967 in California. Although born in New York, Langsner he spent most of his years residing in California. He and his family moved to Ontario, California in 1922.

== HardEdge Colorforms ==
Langsner has become associated with the term that he coined, along with Peter Selz, "hard-edge painting."
