= James Jarvaise =

American painter (1924–2015)

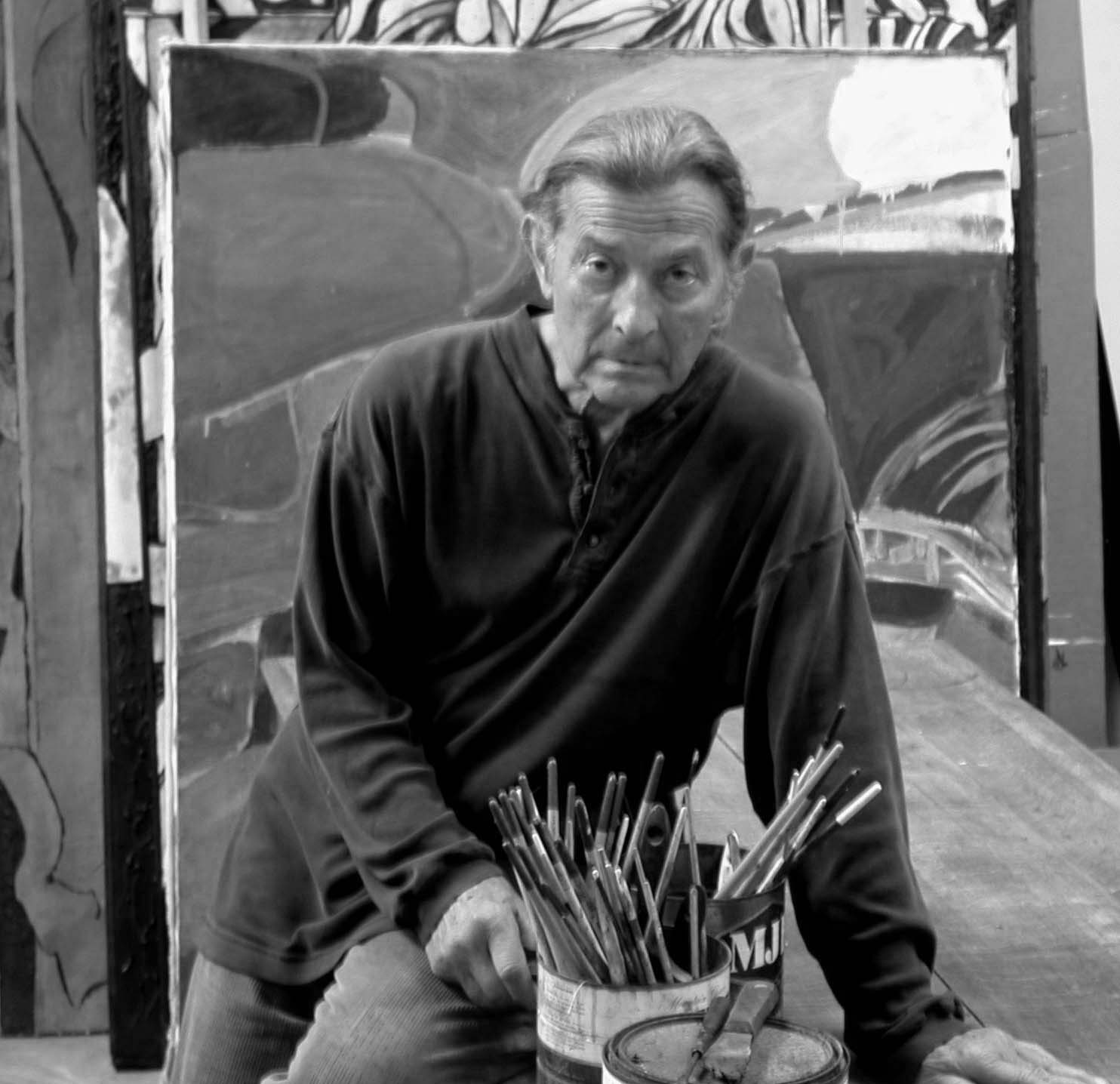
- James Jarvaise in studio in 2010
- Born: James Jarvaise; February 16, 1924; Indianapolis, Indiana, U.S.
- Died: June 19, 2015 (aged 91); Santa Barbara, California
- Known for: Painting, Collage
- Notable work: Hudson River, Man in The Room, Collage, Watercolor
- Movement: Abstract, Modern Art

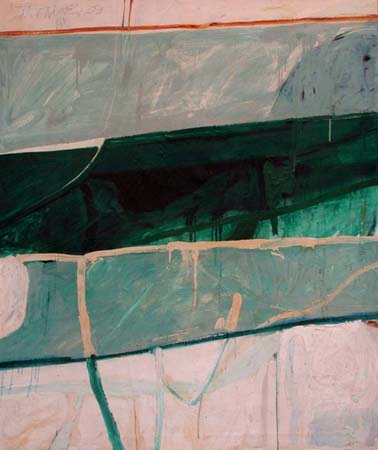
Painting from Hudson River series (1959). Los Angeles. This image depicts James Jarvaise' earlier work that was included in the "Sixteen Americans" exhibition.

James Jarvaise (February 16, 1924 – June 19, 2015) was an American painter based in Southern California.

== Background ==
Jarvaise was born in Indianapolis, Indiana, but later lived in Chicago, Pittsburgh, and eventually moved to Los Angeles in 1946. He was educated at Carnegie Tech in Pittsburgh, PA; Ecole Dart/ Biarritz, France with Fernand Léger; earned a B.F.A. from the University of Southern California in 1952; studied at Yale in 1953; and earned an M.F.A. in 1954 from the University of Southern California. Jarvaise relocated to Santa Barbara in 1969 and, from 1991 forward, served as Head of the Department of Fine and Performing Arts at Oxnard College. Here, he influenced a new generation of painters, including Henry Taylor.

== Art career ==
In 1958 Museum of Modern Art curator Dorothy Canning Miller selected James Jarvaise for inclusion in the museum's Sixteen Americans exhibition (December 1958 – February 1959). His work exhibited alongside Jay deFeo, Jasper Johns, Ellsworth Kelly, Robert Rauschenberg and Frank Stella), with the potential to launch his career to great heights. However, life got in the way. A teaching job, a growing family and a desire for a less urban lifestyle took priority. Jarvaise did not become a household name. All the same he continued with his art.

In 2012, Louis Stern Fine Arts set out to remedy Jarvaise's obscurity with their "James Jarvaise And The Hudson River Series" exhibition. A 98-page catalogue was produced.

His most recent exhibition, "James Jarvaise: Collages Redux" at Louis Stern Fine Arts featured a selection of his latest work from 1989-2013. The show earned him a positive review on KCRW ArtTalk by Hunter Drohojowska-Philp. The review praises the work for being the most youthful art on exhibit in April 2015. James Jarvaise was 91 and energetically attended the opening.

His paintings and collages can be found at the Smithsonian in Washington, DC and the MoMA in New York. Albright Knox Gallery purchased Hudson River School Series # 30 in 1957. Carnegie Museum of Art acquired Hudson River School Series # 16, 1957 the same year. The Hirshhorn Museum and Sculpture Garden at the Smithsonian Museum of American Art in Washington DC houses several unique works by James Jarvaise. The Museum of Modern Art in New York City owns Hudson River School Painting #32. Los Angeles County Museum of Art (LACMA) currently has two James Jarvaise paintings in their permanent collection. The AD&A Gallery, University of California, Santa Barbara acquired Hudson River School Series #59 from the Ruth Schaffner Collection in 1986.

== Personal life ==
James Jarvaise was born on February 16, 1924, in Indianapolis, Indiana, to James Alexis (1888-1965) and Suzanne (Conlin) Jarvaise (1890-1978). His father, born in Turkey to French parents, was a scholar of Greek studies, spoke five languages and was a collector of antiques, largely informing young James’ interests in arts and culture. The family, which included his sisters Julia and Catherine, spent time in New York City and Chicago, but Pittsburgh, Pennsylvania remained their main residence until 1940.

The Jarvaise family moved to Los Angeles where James graduated from John Marshall High School in 1942. After graduating, James enlisted in the United States Army on April 23, 1943, in Los Angeles. He trained at Camp Roberts, California where he was selected for Army Air Corps specialized training at the University of Nebraska, Lincoln. Jarvaise was stationed in Heidelberg, Germany with the United States Army Air Corps from 1944 through 1945. Following the war, Jarvaise traveled throughout France and Germany. While in France, he studied briefly with Fernand Léger in his studios in Paris and Biarritz, France. While studying in Paris, James befriended artist Matsumi “Mike” Kanemitsu who would influence Jarvaise’s early artworks.

James returned to Los Angeles, California in 1946 where he enrolled in the University of Southern California (USC), studying at College of Letters, Arts and Science’s Fine Arts Department. While studying as USC, Jarvaise met his future wife Olive Lorraine Weber (1924-2011), a Literature major. James Jarvaise and Lorraine Webber married in Inglewood, California in 1950. The Jarvaise’s had five children.

During this period, Jarvaise developed a mixed media collage technique that he experimented with throughout his career. Jarvaise assembled found objects, paint, industrial materials, and metals mostly in monochrome palettes of blacks, grays, whites, and beiges. Jarvaise graduated with Bachelor of Fine Arts, University of Southern California, College of Letters, Arts and Science, Fine Arts Department in 1952. Later that year, he was awarded a purchase award for Crystal Lamp at the Annual Exhibition “Art Schools U.S.A.” Addison Gallery of American Art, Andover, Massachusetts.

Jarvaise was an invited to attend Rico Le Brun’s Art Workshop at Yale University in 1953 where he audited Josef Albers’ classes. Also in 1953, Lorraine was offered a teaching assignment by the U.S. Air Force in France which allowed the couple the opportunity to travel and study throughout Europe. Upon their return to Los Angeles, James completed his Master of Fine Arts at the University of Southern California.

Jarvaise taught the Fundamentals of Drawing and Painting at the University of Southern California, College of Letters, Arts and Science, Fine Arts Department in the Fall semester of 1956/1957. Following his adjunct appointment, Jarvaise joined the faculty at USC, teaching at the university, on and off, over the next thirty years.

His early teaching years at USC marked the beginning of his horizontal abstract paintings with subtle colors, mainly painted on masonite board. At the time, Jarvaise was studying Hudson River School painters of the 19th century by Asher Durand and Thomas Cole. Jarvaise realized a profound relationships between the Hudson River School painters and his own abstract works. So much so, that he titled this new series the “Hudson River School Series.” This is when Jarvaise began integrating his surrounding environment into his painting practice. In a MoMA Catalog from 1959, Jarvaise referred to this series, saying:

“In the process of translating my reactions to my surroundings, I have acquired a new understanding of previous generations of American landscape painters. I have come to feel a special sympathy for such artists as Thomas Cole, Asher B. Durand, John Kensett, and Frederick Church. It is to these Hudson River School painters that I have dedicated my own landscapes.”

Over the next five years, Jarvaise taught regularly at the University of Southern California, namely in their design, drawing, and painting departments. While at USC, he taught Drawing from Life I, II, III. He began exploring abstract figuration during his USC tenure. This body of figurative work, titled Man in the Room, allowed experimentation with placing outlines of a human profile on colored grounds and abstract landscapes.

The painting titled Hudson River School Series, No 28, was acquired by Carneigie Tech (today’s Carnegie Mellon University) following Jarvaise participation in a juried exhibition in 1958. Late in 1958, Jarvaise was included in the curated exhibit Sixteen Americans at the Museum of Modern Art (MoMA), New York, New York. Curator of painting and sculpture Dorothy Canning Miller selected six Jarvaise paints to be shown alongside J. De Feo, Wally Hendrick, Jasper Johns, Ellsworth Kelly, Alfred Leslie, Landes Lewitin, Richard Lytle, Robert Mallary, Louise Nevelson, Robert Rauschenberg, Julius Schmidt, Richard Stankiewicz, Frank Stella, Albert Urban, Jack Youngerman.

Much recognition and success followed these early exhibits during the late fifties and early sixties. Hudson River School Series #61 was purchased by Los Angeles County Museum Of Art in 1959. Hudson River School Series, 32, 1957 is acquired for the MoMA collection with funding from the Larry Aldrich Foundation Fund in 1960. Jarvaise was honored as a guest lecturer at Pennsylvania State University, University Park, PA. Additional museum recognition was bestowed upon Jarvaise in 1960 by Albright-Knox Gallery, Buffalo, N.Y. resulting in their acquisition of Hudson River Series, 30, 1957. International recognition emanated from Palacio de Cristal del Retiro, University of Madrid, in connection with the International Art Exposition of 1963 resulting in a two term teaching position .

Upon his return to Los Angeles in the sixties, Jarvaise accepted a teaching positions at Occidental College and Chouinard Art School, California Institute of Art . Meanwhile, art collector Joseph H. Hirshorn gifted eight Jarvaise paintings, all from the 1961 series of still life paintings and landscapes, to the Smithsonian Institution, Washington, D.C. in 1966.

Jarvaise accepted various teaching positions, residencies and administrative positions over the next three decades. He moved his family to Santa Barbara, California after accepting a position at the University of California. Jarvaise accepted teaching opportunities at Santa Barbara Art Institute and Brooks Institute School of Fine Arts. He was selected Painting Department chairman and as director of Seminar Projects for Santa Barbara Art Institute and was awarded Artist in Residence at Moorpark College, Moorpark, California in the seventies. He served as Professor and Department Chair for the Fine and Performing Arts, and Communication Departments at Oxnard College, Oxnard, California. During his tenure at Oxnard, James mentored dozens of aspiring young artists including Henry Taylor.

Jarvaise retired from Oxnard College, Oxnard, California in 2004.

Jarvaise's early works were featured in a solo exhibition, titled James Jarvaise and the Hudson River Series, that was organized and presented by Louis Stern Fine Arts. Jarvaise celebrated the last solo exhibition during his lifetime, James Jarvaise: Collages Redux at Louis Stern Fine Arts. This exhibit featured a selection of his latest work from 1989-2013. The show earned him a positive review on KCRW ArtTalk by Hunter Drohojowska-Philp. The review praised the work for being the most youthful art on exhibit in April 2015. The 91 year old artist attended the public opening event. Jarvaise died peacefully at home later that same year. Jarvaise had five children.

== Shows ==
=== Solo exhibitions ===
- Felix Landau Gallery (1952/1955/1958/1960/1961/1964/1967/1969)
- Allan Gallery, New York (1967)
- Thibault Gallery, New York (1961)
- Gallery San Jorge, Madrid, Spain (1963)
- Ruth S. Schaffner Gallery, Los Angeles (1974)
- James Jarvaise and the Hudson River Series, Louis Stern Fine Arts, West Hollywood, California: September 22 – November 10 (2012)
- James Jarvaise: Collages Redux Louis Stern Fine Arts, West Hollywood, California: March 12 – April 25 (2015)

=== Notable group exhibitions ===
- 15 Americans- Long Beach Museum (1957)
- Sixteen Americans, Museum of Modern Art, New York City, New York: December 16 – February 15, 1958 – 1959
