= Louis Stern =

American art dealer (born 1945)

Louis Stern (born January 7, 1945) is a veteran Los Angeles art dealer and President of Louis Stern Fine Arts in West Hollywood, California. Stern deals in the secondary market for Impressionist and Modern works. His gallery’s program specializes primarily in west coast hard-edge geometric abstraction.

== Early life and family ==
Louis Stern was born in Casablanca, Morocco in 1945, and immigrated with his family to the United States in 1955. He is the oldest son of Frederic Stern, an art dealer who specialized in 19th century French painting. Stern began working in the art business with his father at the age of 16, developing expertise in Impressionist, Post-Impressionist, and Modern art. Stern’s brother Jean Stern is Executive Director Emeritus of the Irvine Museum in Orange County.

== Career and development ==
After being active in the art business in London and Paris, Stern founded his first gallery on Brighton Way in Beverly Hills in 1982. In 1994, he relocated to his current location on Melrose Avenue in West Hollywood. After moving to the Melrose location he exhibited Modern and Impressionist work including solo shows for Matisse, Picasso, Leger, Villon and Kupka. He has acquired and placed works by artists of the late 19th and 20th centuries, including Monet, Renoir, Pissarro, Sisley, Cassatt, Morisot, Degas, Van Gogh, Braque, Chagall, Modigliani, Giacometti, de Kooning, Dubuffet, Francis and Warhol.

While Stern continues to be active in the secondary market, his gallery is focused on leading West Coast hard-edge abstractionists of the twentieth century (representing the estates of Karl Benjamin, Lorser Feitelson, and Helen Lundeberg). The gallery represents a stable of contemporary artists as well, many of whom create work which continues the legacy of hard-edge abstraction.

Over time Stern expanded his specialties to include Latin American art, particularly that of Mexican painter and muralist Alfredo Ramos Martínez, who is considered by many to be the "Father of Mexican Modernism". Stern founded the Alfredo Ramos Martínez Research Project to promote and protect the legacy of the artist. He serves as the director of the project, which is currently compiling the catalogue raisonné for Ramos Martínez. Stern’s advocacy reestablished the reputation of Ramos Martínez, resulting in a major retrospective at the Museo Nacional de Arte (MUNAL) in Mexico City in 1992.

== Involvement and awards ==
Stern has served on the board of directors of the Fine Art Dealers Association (FADA); was vice president of the Art Dealers Association of California from 1990 to 1991; was a member of the International Foundation for Art Research, New York; was a member of the Archives of American Art (Smithsonian Institution, Washington, D.C.); and was a founding member of the Photographic Arts Council at LACMA. He is also on the advisory board of Gallery 825/Los Angeles Art Association, is on the Advisory Council for the Arts at Cedars-Sinai Medical Center in Los Angeles, and is a member of the Getty Research Institute Council. He has advised numerous groups and assemblies regarding buying, selling and collecting important works of art, especially Impressionist and Modern. Stern is also a member of the Art Advisory Panel of the Commissioner of the IRS.

Chevalier de la Légion d'honneur

In 2001, Stern was made a Chevalier in the Arts and Letters by the French Minister of Culture. On December 16, 2007, he was presented with France's highest decoration, the Chevalier de la Légion d'honneur ("Knight of the Legion of Honor") by Pierre Vimont, French Ambassador to the United States, on behalf of the President of France. Created by Napoleon Bonaparte in 1802, it is awarded for gallantry in military action or civilian life for work that enhances the reputation of France through scholarship, arts, sciences and politics.

The Government of France recognized Stern for his efforts to further the knowledge and appreciation of French culture and French artists with his gallery program and his numerous French/American civic affiliations. He is a life member of the American Society of the French Legion of Honor.
