= Tamiji Kitagawa =

Japanese artist (1894–1989)

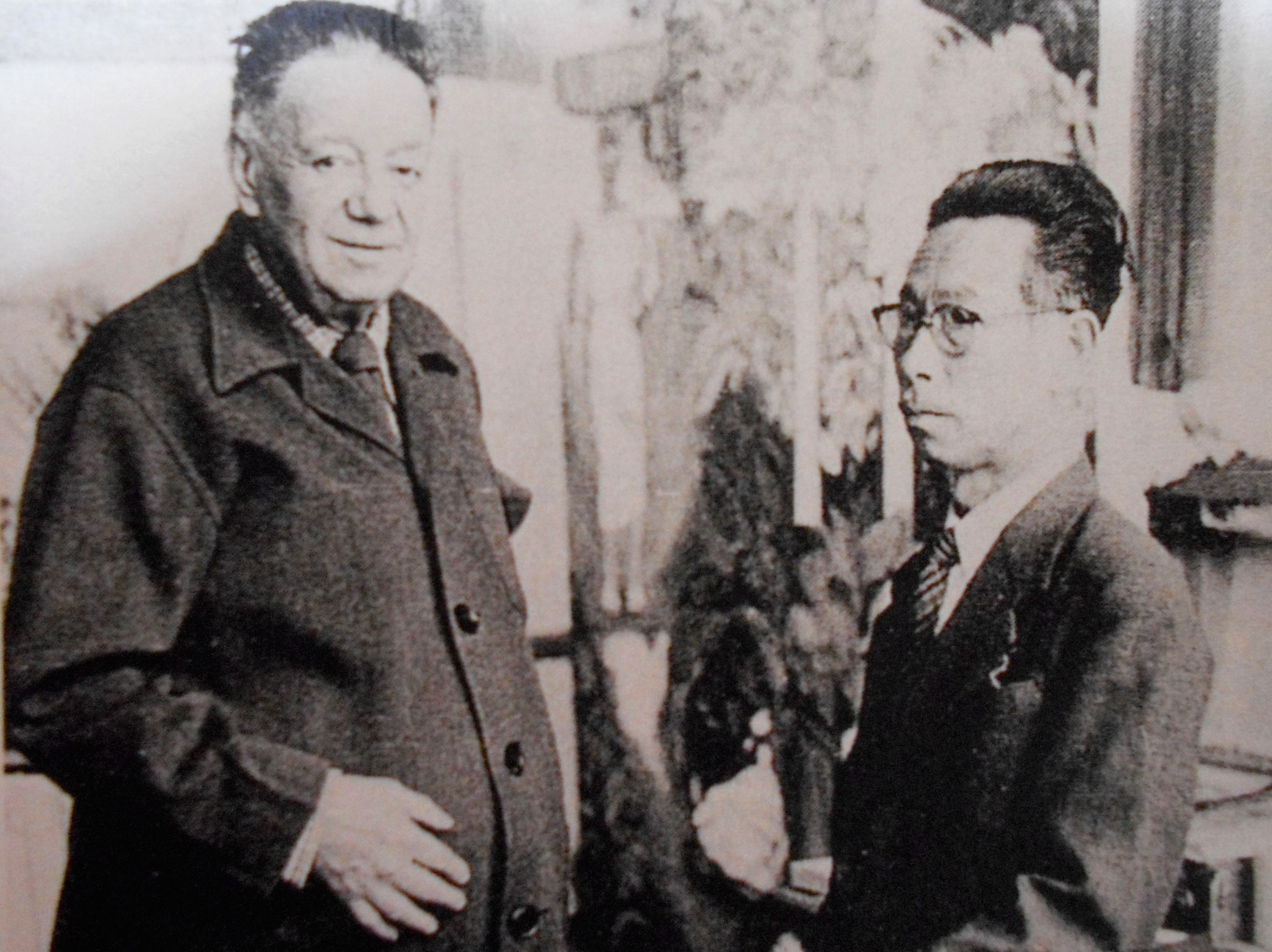
- Tamiji Kitagawa and Diego Rivera in 1955
- Born: January 27, 1894; Ushio (today: Shimada, Shizuoka)
- Died: April 26, 1989 (aged 95); Seto, Aichi

Tamiji Kitagawa (北川 民次, Kitagawa Tamiji; January 27, 1894 – April 26, 1989) was a Japanese painter, printmaker and art educator.

Kitagawa's work, ranging in media from oil and tempera paintings to woodcuts and copperplate prints, to mosaic and ceramic murals, depict not only everyday-life scenes of urban and rural working people, but also political events. He synthesized traditions of postimpressionist, expressionist, Cubist and Surrealist painting with Mexican modernist painting, particularly Mexican muralism, and such Japanese artistic traditions as Nihonga, ink wash painting, and ceramics.

Having encountered such socially aware artists as the US-American realist painter John Sloan and the Mexican modernist painter Alfredo Ramos Martínez during his years in the United States and Mexico from 1914 to 1936, Kitagawa became involved in Ramos Martínez’ Open Air Art Schools of Painting, which, as part of the Mexican postrevolutionary social reforms, provided children and adolescents in rural areas with access to art to foster their emancipation.

After returning to Japan in 1936, Kitagawa was accepted by the Japanese art world for his unique painting style inspired by Mexican muralism. He became a member of the Nika Art Association and began engaging in art education as a jury member of children's art exhibitions and as a publisher of children's books in collaboration with art critic Sadajirō Kubo. Kitagawa became a seminal figure for the progressive art education movement in Japan in the postwar years. Inspired by the Mexican Open Air Art Schools, he organized an open-air summer art school for children and adolescents at the Higashiyama Zoo in Nagoya, founded his own art school, and was involved in the Sōzō Biiku Kyōkai (Society for Creative Art Education), a network of artists, teachers, and parents advocating for a child- and life-centered approach in art education.

With his cross-cultural experiences and knowledge of social, racial and cultural representations of painting, his compassion for disadvantaged social and cultural minorities, and his lifelong social commitment to art and art education as essential for the advancement of a democratic society, Kitagawa was a key figure in establishing a new understanding of art as an essential part of human development in Japan.

== Biography ==
=== Early life ===
Kitagawa was born in 1894 Ushio (Shimada) in Shizuoka prefecture into a family tea producer. He graduated from Shizuoka Commercial High School in 1910 and began his studies of commerce at the Waseda University in Tokyo. During these years Kitagawa became increasingly interested in literature, theater and the arts.

=== United States, 1914–1921 ===
After leaving the university, Kitagawa travelled to the US in 1914. He first stayed with this brother, who lived in Portland, Oregon, then moved to Chicago, and to New York in 1916. In 1918, while working as a day-laborer, he took night classes from painters John Sloan and George B. Bridgman at the Art Students League of New York. In New York, Kitagawa was introduced to European and American art developments, such as the work of Paul Cézanne, but also about the writings of Sigmund Freud and Friedrich Nietzsche. His encounters with artists such as Sloan, Japanese fellow painters Yasuo Kuniyoshi and Toshi Shimizu, whose paintings engaged with social issues and depicted scenes of the everyday lives of working people, were formative for the development for his own socially aware artistic stance. He also became interested in children's art and pedagogy. In 1920, Kitagawa left New York for the south, “seeking a more relaxed life”. After a short stay in Florida, during which he worked on a farm of a Japanese owner, he continued his journey to Havana and arrived in Mexico in 1921.

=== Mexico, 1921–1936 ===
In 1922, Kitagawa began to work as a servant and tutor for a wealthy family in Mexico City. Taking a leave, he travelled around the country for several months, selling paintings of saints. He returned to Mexico City in 1923 and attended the Academy of San Carlos, graduating in 1924. At the recommendation of the academy's director Alfredo Ramos Martínez, an influential Mexican modernist painter, Kitagawa spent a year at Ramos Martínez’ Escuelas de Pintura al Aire Libre (Open Air Schools of Painting) located at the Churubusco monastery. As part of postrevolutionary social reforms implemented to enlighten and emancipate disadvantaged populations, these Open Air Schools offered children and adolescents from rural and indigenous communities the opportunity to express themselves freely through painting without formal instruction or constraints, while being treated by the teachers as comrades, instead of as subordinates. Kitagawa continued to engage in Ramos Martínez’ schools and became an assistant teacher at the Open Air School of Painting in Tlalpan in 1925. Works by the Open Air Schools’ students became internationally recognized, particularly after an exhibition in Madrid, Paris and Berlin in 1926 received praise from renowned artists such as Henri Matisse, Pablo Picasso and Tsuguharu Fujita.

As an artist in his own right, Kitagawa participated in exhibitions of the artist group ¡30 30!, formed by artists who were Open Air School teachers and close to Ramos Martínez, and he held his first solo exhibition at the Hackett Galleries in New York in 1930. Kitagawa's works at that time were influenced by the works of Open Air School students as well as by Mexican muralism, key figures of which, such as Diego Rivera, David Alfaro Siqueiros and José Clemente Orozco, Kitagawa encountered in the early 1930s. In 1932, Kitagawa was appointed director of a newly founded Open Air School in Taxco, a position he held until his return to Japan with his family in 1936. During this time, Fujita, Isamu Noguchi, and Kuniyoshi visited him at separate occasions.

=== Prewar life and career in Japan, 1936–1945 ===
Upon his return to Japan in 1937, Kitagawa and his family lived briefly in Shizuoka and Seto near Nagoya before moving to Tokyo. At Fujita's recommendation, Kitagawa participated in the exhibitions of the Nika Art Association, of which he became a member, but also began to hold solo exhibitions at the Nichidō Gallery in Tokyo. Kitagawa's oil and tempera paintings, watercolors and linocuts from this time were recognized by the Japanese art world, particularly for his unique style that showed influences of Mexican muralism.

Fueled by his experiences of racial, social and cultural differences in the US and Mexico, Kitagawa developed the idea of “people’s art”, i.e., art by and for the common people that would empower them to resist oppression and to achieve freedom. Around 1938, Kitagawa began collaborating with art critic and collector Sadajirō Kubo, who travelled the US and Europe from 1938 until 1939 to discuss ideas about children's art with liberal/progressive art educators such as Franz Cižek and R. R. Tomlison, to promote new art pedagogical approaches in Japan. In 1941, Kitagawa and Kubo founded the publishing company Kodomo Bunka-kai (Children culture society) to produce illustrated books for children. Kitagawa also joined Kubo as jury member for children's art exhibitions in Mooka and Fukui.

During the increasing militarization of Japan under its totalitarian regime, Kitagawa began to privately create paintings thematizing war and death. In 1943, Kitagawa and his family evacuated to Seto, which became the artist's base for the rest of his life.

=== Postwar artistic career and art pedagogy, 1945–1960 ===
In the postwar years, Kitagawa resumed participating in exhibitions of the art associations Nika and the Bijutsu Dantai Rengō (Art association alliance) and other shows, including the Nihon Kokusai Bijutsuten. His paintings from this time depicted portraits, rural and urban landscapes, and scenes of the everyday lives of working people, but also allegorical motifs that included suffering, for example, contorted human bodies. They amalgamated postimpressionist, Cubist, Fauvist and expressionist styles of Pablo Picasso, Marc Chagall and Rufino Tamayo.

Kitagawa in the postwar years emerged as a seminal figure within the art education reformation movement, not only as juror at children's art exhibitions, but also as educator with his own projects, as Kubo's collaborator, as public speaker on art education, and as author and publisher. Drawing from his experiences abroad, Kitagawa conceived of painting as a tool of subjective observation and interpretation of the everyday world that should nourish the individual's urge for freedom. His books 絵を描く子供たち (Children who paint) published in 1952, and 子供の絵と教育 (Children painting and education) in 1953 were widely read and resonated with the new liberal spirit.

==== Nagoya Zoo Art School ====
From 1949 to 1951, Kitagawa organized the Nagoya Zoo Art School (名古屋動物園美術学校), a one-month art school during the summer holidays on the grounds of the Higashiyama Zoo in Nagoya. The school offered children and adolescents between the age of 7 and 15 years the opportunity to freely express themselves in an unconventional amusing setting, distinct from their stressful everyday life and conventional education environment, to release their creativity. To foster the creativity and development of personalities of the students, the teachers encouraged them to explore their environment playfully and to express themselves freely in oil paintings, gouaches, and woodcuts, without intervening by giving them instructions. The students were treated as fellows, avoiding conventional hierarchies. Among the students was artist Shūsaku Arakawa.

To give these art classes a permanent site, the Kitagawa Young Children Art Institute (北川児童美術研究所) in Nagoya opened in May 1951, but Kitagawa soon withdrew from the project, unsatisfied by the lack of governmental engagement.

==== Sōzō Biiku Kyōkai (Society for Creative Aesthetic Education) ====
In 1952, Kitagawa joined Kubo in founding the Sōzō Biiku Kyōkai (Society for Creative Aesthetic Education, or short, Sōbi), an association of art educators, painters, and parents, who advocated for progressive, child-centered art education of children and adolescents. Inspired by European pedagogical approaches such as those of Viennese art educator Franz Cižek, the teaching practices of Sōbi stood in opposition to the instruction-based teaching methods in place in Japan.

Sōbi was structured by locally organized study groups of teachers in rural and semi-rural areas, who understood art as an essential part of human (everyday) life and studied their students’ artworks in order to foster the children's free individual development and confidence and nourish their creative spirit. Rejecting reproductive hierarchic and interventionist teaching practices as a legacy of prewar and wartime authoritarianism, they considered themselves to be facilitators of free development through art, which would ultimately foster children's autonomy and capacity to resist repression and submission. Sōbi organized annual (and later biennial) seminars, lectures and exhibition of children's art at the national level and assembled a rich source of reference by producing Japanese translations of important art pedagogical texts by European authors and by collecting children artworks.

Sōbi played an important role in the postwar Japanese education reformation movement (minkan kyōiku movement), which was widely supported under the US-occupation and peaked in popularity around 1955. With the rise of the conservative LDP-led government of Japan in the mid-1950s, these movements, including Sōbi, faced increasing resistance by the centralizing government to commit to liberal art education.

==== Mid-1950s to mid-1960s ====
In 1955, Kitagawa visited Mexico for a nearly yearlong stay, during which he met again his former students, as well as painters Tamayo, Ribera, and Siqueiros. He continued his trip to the US, Europe, Egypt, Iran, Thailand, and Hong Kong, before returning to Japan in May 1956.

Around the mid-1950s, Kitagawa's active engagement in art education began to diminish, fueled by his disillusionment with the lack of engagement from the Japanese government and society in further pursuing democracy. Kitagawa gradually withdrew from Sōbi due to conceptual differences, which included his focus on older children and adolescents rather than young children, his view that children's art was not only about free expression but needed to address the struggles within their everyday lives, as well as his critical stance towards the practice of children's works being judged by jurors as practiced by Kubo.

Kitagawa's focus shifted back towards his own artistic production, which around this time expanded beyond oil painting by embracing glass painting, mosaic print, mosaic murals, and painted ceramics. Kitagawa's allegorical and urban landscape paintings from the late 1950s to the early 1960s overtly addressed socio-political problems such as conflicts and protest evolving around the US-Japan Security Treaty or the widespread problem of pollution. He published catalogues of his artworks, memoirs, texts on education and children's books, and he continued to participate in the exhibitions of art associations, group exhibitions and solo exhibitions in the Nagoya area and Tokyo. He became vice-president of the Nika Art Association in 1961.

=== Later life, mid-1960s to 1989 ===
In the late 1960s, Kitagawa began to shift towards less overtly political subjects in his paintings and etchings, by depicting images of human relationships, such as mother and child or couples, or landscapes of his native region Shizuoka.

In 1978, Kitagawa was appointed president of Nika, but quit shortly after, lamenting that the association had become an “arena for fights that were unrelated to the art movement”. Later that year, he publicly announced he was giving up creating new paintings; however, he continued to show his existing works in numerous group and solo exhibitions, and created a few drawings and paintings around the mid-1980s. In 1986, Kitagawa received the Order of the Aztec Eagle of the Mexican government. He died of pulmonary fibrosis on April 26, 1989.

== Work ==
Kitagawa's oil and tempera paintings, woodcuts and copperplate prints, mosaic and ceramic murals were dedicated to the figurative depiction of the everyday lives and environment of urban and rural working populations and allegorical renderings of central social and political problems of his time, such as war and death, anti-war protests and pollution. His work was deeply influenced by Mexican ancient and modern art, particularly Mexican muralism and the works of students of open-air art schools, which he amalgamated with European and Japanese painting traditions such as postimpressionism, Cubism, Fauvism and expressionism, reminiscent of painters such as Cézanne, Picasso, Marc Chagall and Tamayo.

Pursuing his idea of “people’s art”, Kitagawa developed a particular interest in Mexican and Japanese folk arts and crafts such as pottery and ceramics, and, after returning to Japan in 1936, connected with artists of the Japanese Mingei movement and the ceramic culture of his hometown Seto. In the 1950s, he also held exhibitions of glass paintings.

Murals, as a public art form able to convey political messages and to engage and form society, continued to be crucial for Kitagawa's work. He referred to his easel paintings as “preliminary sketches” of murals, and his oil paintings remained closely attached to murals in form and content. During his stay in Mexico in 1955, Kitagawa was introduced to the use of materials such as mosaic and pyroxylin by Rivera and Siqueiros. Between 1959 and 1970, he realized four large scale mosaic and ceramic murals.

Impressed by the works of French artist Fernand Léger, which he saw in Paris in 1956, Kitagawa soon introduced bold dark contour lines and geometrically abstracted tubular human figures and architectural elements in his paintings of industrial factory scenes and landscapes. Kitagawa's allegorical and urban landscape paintings from the late 1950s to the early 1960s overtly addressed socio-political problems such as conflicts and protest evolving around the US-Japan Security Treaty in 1959/60, e.g. in his paintings Cloud of Locusts (1959) or White and Black (1960), or the widespread problem of pollution by factories in Japan in the 1960s, as in his painting Red Oil Tank (1960).

In the 1970s, he created several series of etchings, such as the Erotic series, which, inspired by Picasso, depicted nude couples in sexually intimate poses, as well as etchings involving the motif of the grasshopper, his alter ego and symbol for people's art. He also created several ink wash paintings with traditional Buddhist motifs. He chose more intimate and interhuman themes such as mother-child figures or landscapes of his native region Shizuoka. Despite his announcement in 1978 to quit painting, he produced a small number of paintings in the mid-1980s.

== Publications ==
- マハフノツボ (Magic vase), n.p.: Sankyōsha, 1942.
- 十歳以後の美術教育 (Art education from the age of ten), n.p.: Sōzō Biiku Kyōkai, 1952.
- 絵を描く子供たち (Children who paint), Tokyo: Iwanami Shoten, 1952.
- 子供の絵と教育 (Children painting and education), Tokyo: Sōgensha, 1953.
- メキシコの青春: 十五年をインディアンと共に (Youth in Mexico: Fifteen years with the Indians), Tokyo: Kōbunsha, 1955.
- メキシコの誘惑 (The temptations of Mexico), Tokyo: Shinchōsha, 1960.
- うさぎのみみはなぜながい, Tokyo: Fukuinkan, 1962.
- 美術教育とユートピア (Art education and utopia): Tokyo: Sōgensha, 1969.
- バッタの哲学: アフォリズム : 北川民次版画集 / Batta Narrates: Original Etchings and Aphorisms by Tamiji Kitagawa, Tokyo: UNAC TOKYO, 1974.
- 驢馬のたわごと: 北川民次随筆集 (Trivial talk by a donkey: Collected essays by Tamiji Kitagawa), Nagoya: Nichidō garō, 1983.
