= Cecilia Z. Miguez =

Cecilia Z. Miguez (born 1955 in Montevideo, Uruguay) is a Los Angeles–based sculpture artist.

She works out of her studio in Altadena, California which is located northeast of Los Angeles. She was born and raised in Montevideo, Uruguay. Because she liked to draw, Miguez decided to study architecture, but eventually decided to move to art in order to satisfy her creative spirit.

Miguez studied painting for several years, and then moved to Southern California in 1985. She first began working for the Uruguayan consulate and then, In 1994, she joined a group of artists, The Drawing Group, that met weekly and painted from live models. This group sparked her devotion to a fine art career with special interest in flight subjects, inspired by her deep interest in Leonardo da Vinci and his designs for flying machines. Of this interest, she says: "Many times we don't let ourselves fly and be the most we can be." (168)

== Solo exhibitions ==
2008 Buschlen-Mowatt Gallery, Vancouver, Canada, Storybooks and Time Pieces, February 1 – February 28.

2008 Louis Stern Fine Arts, West Hollywood, California, New Work by Cecilia Z. Miguez, September 6 – November 8.

2006 Louis Stern Fine Arts, West Hollywood, "Twenty Hours Before Dawn", September 14 - December 9

2006 Irving Galleries, Palm Beach, Florida, "Guardians & Angels - Journey of the Spirit", February/March

2005 Buschlen-Mowatt, Vancouver, Canada, March 30 - April 30

2005 Rio Hondo College Art Gallery, "Form & Grace", March 1 - April 12

2005 Buschlen -Mowatt, Palm Desert, January 1 - February 1

2004 Louis Stern Fine Arts, West Hollywood, "Flights of Imagination", September 9 - October 29

2003 Riverside Art Museum, Journeys, Riverside, California, April 17- May 24

2002 Louis Stern Fine Arts, "Transmigrations", West Hollywood, California, September 14 - October 26.

2002 The Uruguay Cultural Foundation for the Arts, "Transmigrations", Washington D.C., October 9 - November 5.

2002 Praxis Gallery, New Sculpture Coral Gables, Florida, January 4 - February 4

2001 Praxis Gallery, "Barcos y Sirenas" - Buenos Aires, Argentina, August 24 - September 4

2001 Louis Stern Fine Arts, "Escultura" - West Hollywood, California, March 3 - April 14

1999 Louis Stern Fine Arts, New Work - West Hollywood, California, September 16 - October 30

1999 Praxis Gallery, Buenos Aires, Argentina, April 6 - April 24

1998 Louis Stern Fine Arts, Recent Work - West Hollywood, California, January 13 - February 28

1997 Museo de Arte Americano de Maldonado, Montevideo, Uruguay, February 15–28

1996 Praxis Gallery, Buenos Aires, Argentina, October 15 - November 6

1996 Figari Gallery, Ministry of Foreign Affairs, Montevideo, Uruguay September 20–30

1992 UCLA, International Student Center, Los Angeles, California May 15–29

1985 Casa de Teatro Gallery, Montevideo, Uruguay, August

1985 Cantegril Country Club, Punta del Este, Uruguay, January

1980 Amalfi Gallery, Punta del Este, Uruguay, January

1978 Zorrilla de San Martin Museum, Montevideo, Uruguay September 4–15

1978 Cantegril Country Club, Punta del Este, Uruguay, January
