= Anselmo Govi =

Italian painter (1893–1953)

Anselmo Govi (Reggio Emilia, 1893–1953) was an Italian painter and decorator, a member of the late Art Nouveau school known in Italy as Liberty style.

== Biography ==
He was born in Reggio Emilia. The surname Govi is the Romanesque version of the French Medieval surname "Le Govic" or "Le Goff", also known as Gove, Govier or Govi. This suggests a branch of his paternal family originated in the Franco-Provençal area and moved later to Italy. Anselmo Govi was the maternal uncle of Giacomo Benevelli.

Govi was Director of the Art Institute Gaetano Chierici and President of the Cooperative of Painters and Decorators of Reggio Emilia. His masterpiece is the frescoes on the cupola of the Ariosto Theatre in Reggio Emilia; the works, painted in 1927 in Liberty Style or Italian Art Nouveau, depict scenes from the Orlando Furioso by the fellow citizen Ariosto. The ledge of the dome is also painted with the first verses of the Ariosto's poem.

During the twenties, Govi painted the frescoes adorning the 16th century Palazzo Ancini in Reggio Emilia. The ceiling of the main staircase are decorated with an Allegory of Charity.

Anselmo Govi painted the frescoes and mosaics that adorn the facade of the Suburban Cemetery of Reggio Emilia. The Cemetery was built in 1808 and designed by Domenico Marchelli (1764-1832). The facade (1932-35) was conceived by the architect Prospero Sorgato with contribution by Govi.

Govi also painted frescoes (1935) for the Rocca Estense which now houses the Museum of the Agriculture in San Martino in Rio. The frescoes, inspired by Venetian Renaissance painting, depict Christ and twelve angels. Govi's fresco adorn the presbytery of the Sanctuary of the Blessed Virgin in Montecchio Emilia. In 1937 he painted the frescoes of the vaults, nave and apse of the Church of San Pietro Apostolo, Carignano in Parma. The frescoes depict episodes from the life of St. Peter.

Paintings by Anselmo Govi are permanently exhibited at Palazzo Vezzani-Pratonieri (16th century) in via San Carlo in Reggio Emilia and in the Church of San Pietro, Reggio Emilia.

In 1980 the Civic Museums of Reggio Emilia organized a major retrospective exhibition dedicated to Govi. Titled Anselmo Govi: Painter and Decorator, the exhibition was accompanied by an illustrated catalogue edited by G. Berti, T. Storchi, N. Squarza (published by Musei Civici Reggio Emilia). The City of Reggio Emilia dedicated a street to him.
