= Palazzo Ancini =

Mannerist-style palace

Coordinates: 44.69715°N 10.62979°E

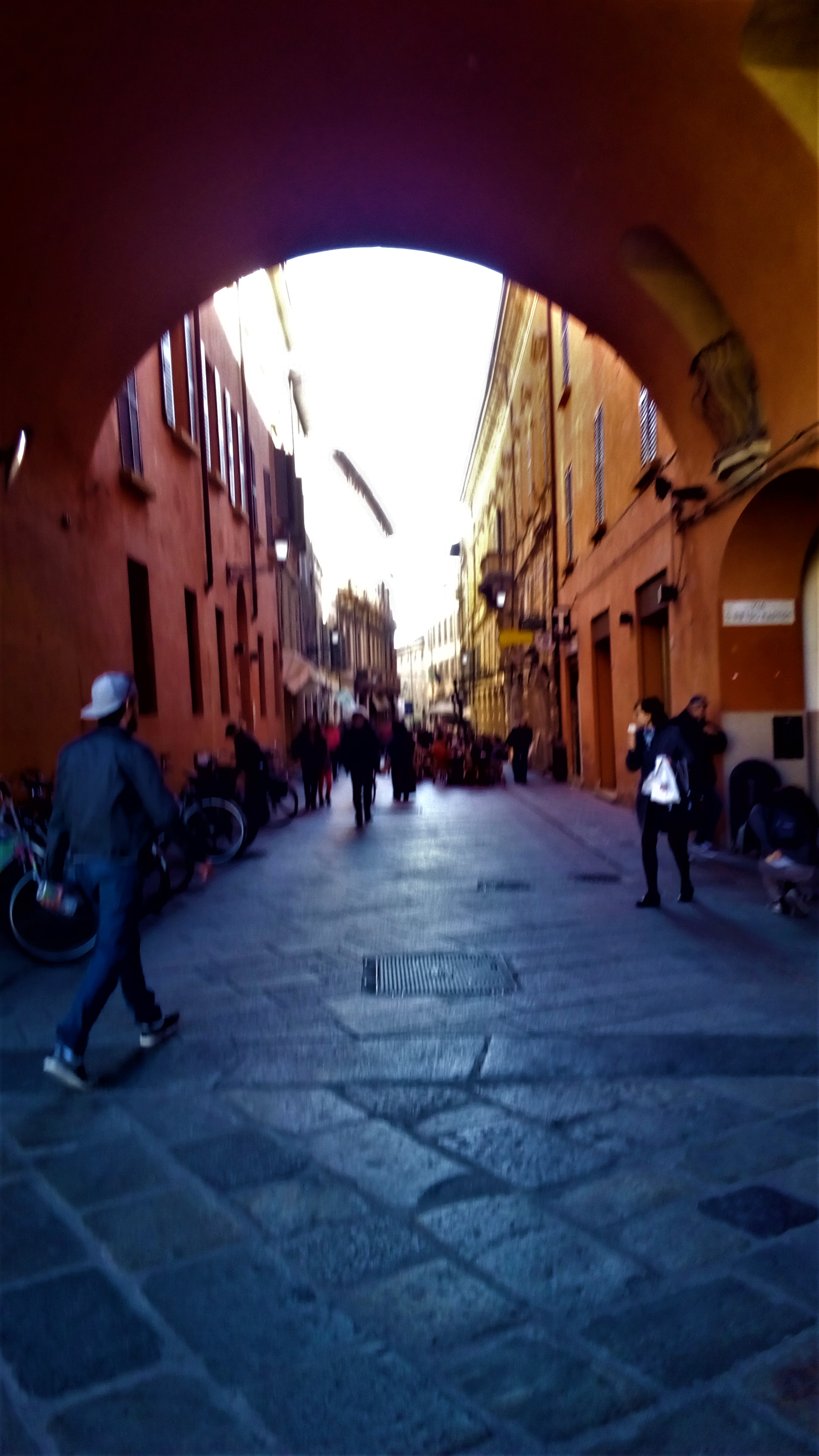
View of Via Luigi Carlo Farini through the arch leading into Piazza Prampolini; the Ancini palace is the second facade on the right

The Palazzo Ancini is a Mannerist-style palace with a main facade located on Via Luigi Carlo Farini #4 in the historic center of the town of Reggio Emilia in Italy.

An original palace at the site had been commissioned by the Ruggieri family, but belonged by 1659 to the Pegoletti family, and after 1766 to the family of the Count Sormani. In 1821, it became property of the Count of Ancini, whose family left the property in 1887 to the Congregation of Charity.

The building, including the facade underwent a severe reconstruction from 1924 to 1930 under the direction of professor Luigi Bertolini. The arrangement of the windows, with grotesque masks, and the central Mannerist stone portico are original. The ceiling of the interior scalone d'onore was frescoed by Anselmo Govi in the 1920s. Facing the facade, to the right of the portal, is a plaque remembering the local labor leader Luigi Roversi (1858 – 1917).
