= Louis Stern Fine Arts =

Coordinates: 34.080653°N 118.387862°W

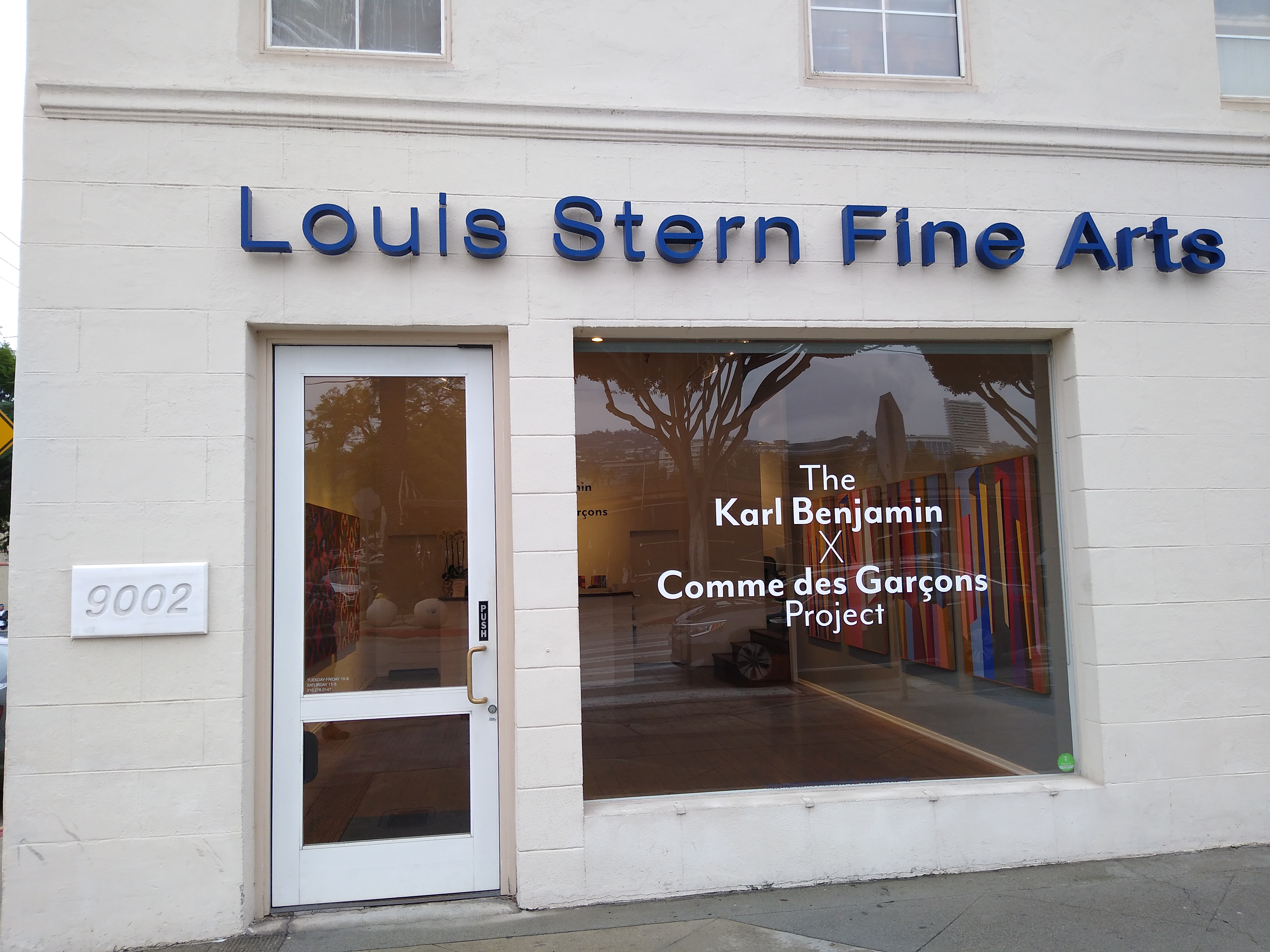
Louis Stern Fine Arts 9002 Melrose Avenuen West Hollywood, California

Louis Stern Fine Arts is an art gallery located at 9002 Melrose Avenue in West Hollywood, California, in the heart of the city’s Avenue of Art and Design.

== History and development ==
Louis Stern Fine Arts was founded in 1988 by Louis Stern, a second-generation art dealer who was born in Casablanca, Morocco, and came to the United States in 1955. He entered the art business in Los Angeles with his father, Frederic Stern, and developed expertise in Impressionist, Post-Impressionist, Modern, and Latin-American art before establishing a gallery that focuses on leading West Coast abstractionists of the twentieth century.

Association with Hard-Edge Painters

The gallery began to re-examine West Coast abstraction, also called Hard-edge, in 2000 and launched an ongoing series of exhibitions in 2003 with the work of Lorser Feitelson (1898–1978), a public advocate of modern art and founder of Southern California’s hard-edge abstraction. The first show, "Lorser Feitelson and the Invention of Hard Edge Painting," was followed by "Lorser Feitelson: The Kinetic Series—Works from 1916-1923" in 2005 and "Lorser Feitelson: The Late Paintings" in 2009.

Helen Lundeberg (1908–1999) co-founded the New Classicism movement with Lorser Feitelson in 1934. The two later married, but continued creating independent bodies of work. Lundeberg’s distinctive blend of abstraction and figuration made its first appearance at Louis Stern Fine Arts in 2004, in "Helen Lundeberg and the Illusory Landscape: Five Decades of Painting." "Infinite Distance—Architectural Compositions by Helen Lundeberg" followed in 2007.

Karl Benjamin (1925–2012), who emerged on the national art scene in 1959 as one of four Southern California Abstract Classicists and engaged in a lifelong exploration of color relationships, began his affiliation with the gallery in 2004 with "Karl Benjamin: Paintings from 1950-1965." Subsequent Benjamin exhibitions at Louis Stern Fine Arts include "Dance the Line: Paintings by Karl Benjamin" in 2007, "Karl Benjamin and the Evolution of Abstraction 1950-1980" in 2011, and "Karl Benjamin: The Late Paintings" in 2014.

June Harwood (1933–2015) although not part of the first exhibition of work considered to be hard edge, Many of her early paintings consisted of shapes that were more or less rectangular, often in silver, gray and black, defined by crisp lines and edges. Characteristic of hard edge paintings, they had a flat, geometric look. Harwood's work was included in a 1964 hard edge show in San Diego, curated by her husband, Jules Langsner. Exhibitions at Louis Stern Fine Arts include "June Harwood: Hard Edge Revisited" in 2008, and "June Harwood: Splinter, Divide and Flow" in 2015.

Additional work and exhibitions

The gallery has also presented major exhibitions by European modernists, including "János Mattis Teutsch and the Hungarian Avant-Garde, 1910-1935," in 2002.

The exhibition program has also featured "Frederick Wight: Visions of California" in 2005, "Seeing the Light: Post-Modern Luminous Landscapes by Frederick Wight" in 2008, and "Roger Kuntz: Signs of LA" in 2012.

In addition, the gallery shows contemporary painting, sculpture and photography by Carlos Cruz-Diez, Knopp Ferro, George Herms, James Jarvaise, Samella Lewis, Cecilia Miguez, Elizabeth Patterson, among others.

Louis Stern Fine Arts is also active in the secondary market, representing impressionist, modern, and contemporary works of art. Louis Stern Fine Arts is a member of the Art Dealers' Association of America (ADAA).

== The Alfredo Ramos Martinez Research Project ==
Louis Stern Fine Arts began a public association with Mexican modernist Alfredo Ramos Martinez in 1991 with a retrospective exhibition of works by the artist, who lived in Los Angeles from 1929 until his death, in 1946. In collaboration with his daughter, Maria Martinez Bolster, and art historian Margarita Nieto, the gallery subsequently established the Alfredo Ramos Martinez Research Project to "protect the artist’s legacy and to advance the understanding and appreciation of the artist whom many have deemed the father of Mexican Modern Art." The Research Project published a monograph, Alfredo Ramos Martinez & Modernismo, by Margarita Nieto and Louis Stern in 2009, and is currently compiling a catalogue raisonné of the artist’s paintings and frescos.

== Publications ==
Louis Stern Fine Arts has published catalogs in conjunction with its exhibitions of works by Karl Benjamin, Lucien Clergue, Lorser Feitelson, James Jarvaise, Samella Lewis, Helen Lundeberg, Alfredo Ramos Martinez, and Frederick Wight. In collaboration with the Feitelson/Lundeberg Art Foundation, the gallery co-published two monographs, Helen Lundeberg: Poetry Space Silence by Suzanne Muchnic and Lorser Feitelson: Eternal Recurrence by Diane Moran, in 2014. A catalogue raisonné of Karl Benjamin’s work is underway in partnership with the artist’s daughter, Beth Benjamin and is accessible online.

== Artists presented ==
- Karl Benjamin
- Harry Bertoia
- Jean Charlot
- Mimi Chen Ting
- Lucien Clergue
- Gabriele Evertz
- Lorser Feitelson
- Laurie Fendrich
- Knopp Ferro
- Frederick Hammersley
- June Harwood
- George Herms
- Ana Mercedes Hoyos
- Heather Hutchison
- James Jarvaise
- Ynez Johnston
- Béla Kádár
- Matsumi Kanemitsu
- Judit Kárász
- Jerome Kirk
- Roger Kuntz
- Mokha Laget
- Mark Leonard
- Samella Lewis
- James Little
- Helen Lundeberg
- Cecilia Miguez
- Leonard Nimoy
- Magali Nougaréde
- Doug Ohlson
- Elizabeth Patterson
- Anita Payró
- Ken Price
- Alfredo Ramos Martinez
- Hugo Scheiber
- Leon Polk Smith
- Jean-Francois Spricigo
- János Mattis-Teutsch
- Frederick S. Wight
- Richard Wilson
