= Samella Lewis =

American art historian (1924–2022)

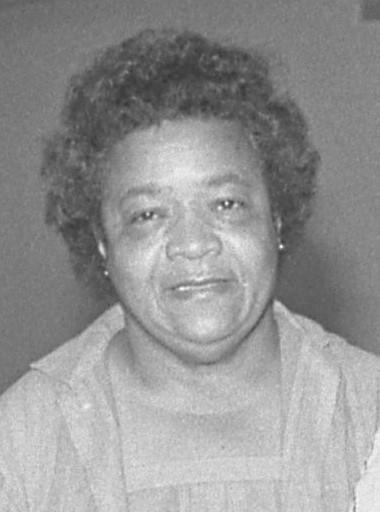
- Lewis in 1984
- Born: Samella Sanders; February 27, 1923; New Orleans, Louisiana, U.S.
- Died: May 27, 2022 (aged 99); Torrance, California, U.S.
- Education: Hampton Institute; Hampton University; Ohio State University
- Occupations: Artist, art historian
- Spouse: Paul Gad Lewis (m. 1948–2013; his death)
- Children: 2

Samella Sanders Lewis (February 27, 1923 – May 27, 2022) was an American visual artist and art historian. She worked primarily as a printmaker and painter. She has been called the "Godmother of African American Art". She received Distinguished Artist Award for Lifetime Achievement from the College Art Association (CAA) in 2021.

“Art is not a luxury as many people think – it is a necessity. It documents history – it helps educate people and stores knowledge for generations to come.” – Dr. Samella Lewis

== Early life and background ==
Samella Sanders was born to Samuel Sanders and Rachel Taylor Sanders in New Orleans, Louisiana, on February 27, 1923, and raised in Ponchatoula, Louisiana. Her father worked as a farmer and mother along other jobs worked as a domestic worker. Widely exhibited and collected as an artist herself, Lewis was better known as a historian, critic, and collector of art, especially African-American art. Lewis completed four degrees, five films, seven books, and a substantial body of artworks which have received critical respect. She pursued an art degree starting off at Dillard University in 1941, but left Dillard for Hampton Institute in Virginia, earning her master's degree in 1947. She earned her B.A. degree at Hampton University, then completed her master and doctorate in art history and cultural anthropology at the Ohio State University in 1951. Lewis was the first female African American to earn a doctorate in fine art and art history.

While finishing her doctorate, Lewis taught art at Morgan State University. Lewis became the first Chair of the Fine Arts Department at Florida A&M University in 1953; that same year Lewis also became the first African American to convene the National conference of African-American artists held at Florida A&M University. She was a professor at the State University of New York, California State University, Long Beach, and at Scripps College in Claremont, California. She co-founded, with Bernie Casey, the Contemporary Crafts Gallery in Los Angeles in 1970. In 1973, she served on the selection committee for the exhibition BLACKS: USA: 1973 held at the New York Cultural Center.

Lewis's grandson is Bay Area artist and musician Unity Lewis. He plans to create a contemporary version of Samella Lewis's catalog Black Artists on Art, which featured black artists not typically showcased in mainstream art galleries and sold thousands of copies. "I wanted to make a chronology of African American artists, and artists of African descent, to document our history. The historians weren't doing it. I felt it better the artists do it anyway, through pictorial and written information… It was really about the movement," Samella Lewis said of the book published in 1969 and 1971.

In 1960–70s, Samella Lewis belonged to a group of artists that would meet every month.

Lewis began collecting art in 1942. She mostly collected art from WPA and the Harlem Renaissance.

== Career ==
In the 1960s and 1970s Lewis's work, which includes lithographs, linocuts, and serigraphs, reflected humanity and freedom. Between 1969 and 1970, Lewis and E.J. Montgomery were consultants for a "groundbreaking" exhibition creating awareness to the history of African American history and art.

Lewis was the founder of the International Review of African American Art in 1975. In 1976, she founded the Museum of African-American Art with a group of artistic, academic, business and community leaders in Los Angeles, California. These founders had similar goals, including increasing the public's awareness of African American art. Many individuals and corporations, such as Macy's, made generous donations to the museum. Lewis, as the staff's senior curator in the museum, not only organized a great number of exhibitions but also developed diverse ways of educating the public on African American arts. In an article, she discussed the ideas of "art of tradition", and argued that museums had the responsibility to explore the African roots of African American art. The museum operates on donations in the Baldwin Hills Crenshaw Plaza with staff and volunteers who are dedicated to supporting the museum. Lewis once mentioned an "art of inspiration" based on the experiences of African Americans themselves. Lewis founded three other museums in the Los Angeles, California.

Lewis was an NAACP member, and a collector of art with her collection including African, Chinese, Asian, South American, and other works. Some of the art that Lewis collected was transferred to the Hampton Institute, now the University Museum.

In 1984, she produced a monograph on the artist Elizabeth Catlett, who had been one of Lewis's mentors at Dillard University.

In 2012, works by Lewis were exhibited alongside selected artworks from her personal collection in Samella Lewis and the African American Experience at Louis Stern Fine Arts in West Hollywood, California. The exhibition was accompanied by a full-color catalogue with text by art writer and critic Suzanne Muchnic.

In 2015, Unity Lewis and art entrepreneur Trevor Parham created The Legacy Exhibit, which featured three generations of black fine artists, including contemporary artists as well as some included in the original Black Artists on Art. The show launched their recruitment efforts for 500 black American artists to participate in the updated volumes.

== Personal life and death ==
Lewis married mathematician Paul Gad Lewis in 1948 and they had two sons. He died in 2013. She died from renal failure in a hospice in Torrance, California, on May 27, 2022, at the age of 99.

== Exhibitions ==
- 1969: Samella Lewis and George Clack, Brockman Gallery, Los Angeles
- 1980: Solo Exhibition, University Union Gallery, California State Polytechnic University, Pomona, California
- 1980: Smithsonian Institution traveling exhibition, United States and Canada
- 1981: Solo exhibition, Pasadena City College, Pasadena, California
- 1981: Solo exhibition, University of California, San Diego
- 1984: African American Art in Atlanta, Public and Corporate Collections, High Museum of Art, Atlanta, Georgia
- 1984: Solo exhibition, Museum of African American Art, Los Angeles, California
- 2011: Now Dig This!: Art and Black Los Angeles 1960–1980, Hammer Museum, Los Angeles, California
- 2012: Samella Lewis and the African American Experience, Louis Stern Fine Arts, West Hollywood, California

== Awards and recognition ==
- 1962: Fulbright Fellowship to study Asian culture at First Institute of Chinese Civilization and Tung Mai University, Taiwan
- 1964–65: National Defense Education Act postdoctoral fellow at University of Southern California, studying Chinese language and Asian civilization
- 1993: Charles White lifetime Achievement Award
- 1995: UNICEF Award for the Visual Arts
- 1996–97: Named a Distinguished Scholar by the Getty Center for the History of Art and Humanities
- 2003: The History Maker Award
- 2004: Special Day Recognition Award for Outstanding Contributions from the City of New Orleans
- 2005: Alumni Association Award from the Ohio State University
- 2021: Distinguished Artist Award for Lifetime Achievement from the College Art Association
