= Frederick S. Wight =

American painter

Frederick S. Wight 1973, Courtesy of The Estate of Frederick S. Wight

Frederick S. Wight (June 1, 1902 – July 26, 1986) was a multi-talented cultural leader who played a significant role in transforming Los Angeles into a major art center. An influential educator at the University of California, Los Angeles, who presented museum-quality exhibitions at the campus gallery later named the Wight Art Gallery, Wight was also a highly accomplished painter and writer. In his final years he concentrated on his painting, producing radiant landscapes that appear to be animated by mysterious, spiritual forces.

== Early life ==
Frederick Stallknect Wight was born in New York City, the only child of Carol Wight, who became a professor of English and the classics at Johns Hopkins University after a struggle with mental illness, and Alice Stallknect, an artist with a forceful personality who encouraged her son's creative proclivities. The family moved repeatedly during Frederick's childhood, finally settling in Chatham, a small fishing town on Cape Cod, Massachusetts, in 1910. He graduated from high school in 1917, at 15, and spent the following year preparing to enter the University of Virginia. Upon graduation in 1923, his uncle, Dr. Sherman Wight, who had financed the young man's college education, provided additional funds for him to spend two years studying art at the Académie Julian in Paris.

== Career beginnings ==
Wight returned to Cape Cod in 1925 and attempted to support himself as a portrait painter. His subjects included family friends, local sea captains and, eventually, prominent arts figures such as writers Erskine Caldwell, James Branch Cabell and Henry Seidel Canby, sculptor for Jacques Lipchitz and painter Lyonel Feininger. He also developed an interest in psychologically charged landscapes and established himself as a writer. His first novel, "South", was published in 1935. His work was also part of the painting event in the art competition at the 1932 Summer Olympics.

=== Personal life ===
His marriage in 1936 to a young English woman, Joan Elizabeth Bingham, led to a blissful period of travel in Joan's homeland and the South of France, where Frederick painted landscapes, experimented with a new style that he called Semi-Surrealist and pursued his writing. In 1938, the couple returned to the United States and settled in Chatham, where Frederick devoted most of his time to literary work, in the hope of forging a career in writing. Their only child, George Frederick Wight, was born in nearby Hyannis, in 1942.

=== War years and beyond ===
Wight had considerable success as a novelist and short story writer, but World War II changed his professional course. When the United States entered the war, he joined the Navy and was sent to Europe. He initially worked as an illustrator. Later, when his superiors became aware of his literary talent, he was editor of the amphibious forces' newspaper. Toward the end of the war, he was sent to London, where he made drawings of Normandy beaches in preparation for the 1944 invasion. After taking part in the liberation effort, he worked for the Naval Division of Office of Strategic Services in London as an interrogator of prisoners and espionage suspects. In his final assignment, he interviewed French Resistance leaders and wrote a report on their work.

Discharged from the Navy in 1945 as a lieutenant commander, Wight returned to Chatham. Faced with the uncertain prospect of supporting his family as a writer or painter, he decided to go into museum work with the help of the G.I. Bill of Rights. He enrolled in Harvard's museum training program led by Paul J. Sachs at the Fogg Art Museum, where he also worked with noted art historians Agnes Mongan, John Rewald and Jakob Rosenberg. The oldest and most experienced member of his class, Wight wrote the principal essay for the catalog of the students’ exhibition, "Between the Empires: Géricault, Delacroix, and Chassériau: Painters of the Romantic Movement." He graduated with a master's degree in 1946.

Wight spent the next six years at the Institute of Contemporary Art, Boston, first as director of education, then associate director of the institute. Among his projects were exhibitions of the work of Louis Sullivan, José Clemente Orozco, Le Corbusier and Walter Gropius.

== Mid-career ==
In 1953 Wight accepted an offer to teach at UCLA's art department and direct of the university's new art gallery. He stayed for 20 years, becoming chair of the department and shaping a stellar exhibition program in a period when Los Angeles had relatively few museums. To raise funds and the gallery's profile, he organized a private support group and circulated UCLA's shows to other institutions.

During his 20-year tenure, UCLA presented the work of major figures including Jean Arp, Morris Graves, Hans Hofmann, Arthur Dove, Henri Matisse, Pablo Picasso and Richard Neutra, as well as thematic exhibitions. In addition to organizing the shows, Wight wrote essays in dozens of exhibition catalogs and authored monographs on prominent artists. He also helped to establish the university's Grunwald Center for the Graphic Arts and Franklin D. Murphy Sculpture Garden. Midway in his tenure, in 1964, he was a resident artist and scholar at the American Academy in Rome.

The gallery was named the Wight Art Gallery in 1974 in his honor, and in 1991 it held a commemorative exhibition of his work entitled "Sudden Nature: The Art of Frederick S. Wight", featuring more than 50 of his paintings.

== Art ==
Wight painted throughout his life and frequently showed his work, but his career as an artist took off with surprising force after his retirement from the university in 1973. Moving from relatively quiet still lifes to highly expressive landscapes, he painted celestial fireworks, planets in motion, dramatic sunsets and sunrises, ominous winds and clouds, powerful mountain ranges and seismic shocks.

"While for many artists the twilight of a career often represents a refinement of familiar gestures, it was for Wight nothing less than a new dawn, the beginning of his true artistic originality," art historian Edith A. Tonelli wrote in the catalog of UCLA's 1991 exhibition of Wight's work. "He became in these years that rarity at any age, a great painter."

"The ultimate theme Wight explored," she wrote, "was the interaction between the ocean shore, the water, and the sky beyond. The continuously shifting illumination of the coast under a variety of climatic conditions and the essential simplicity of the primordial entities of shore, water, and sky encouraged him to an ever greater pictorial freedom."

In a catalog essay for a 2008 exhibition at Louis Stern Fine Arts in West Hollywood, Michael Duncan described Wight as a late bloomer who perpetuated "a tradition of hallucinatory American landscape painting by artists such as Agnes Pelton, Marsden Hartley, Raymond Jonson and Georgia O'Keeffe."

"His luminous landscape paintings made from 1974 until his death in 1986 are his true legacy," Duncan wrote, "a body of work that significantly contributes to American and Californian art. Still fresh, powerful, and wildly underrated, Wight's landscapes are one of the premier achievements of west-coast art of the 1980s."

Wight died July 26, 1986.

== Selected Art Publications ==
"Milestones of American Painting in Our Century," exhibition catalog, Institute of Contemporary Art, Boston. New York: Chanticleer Press, 1949. "The Work of Lyonel Feininger," exhibition catalog, Cleveland Museum of Art. Cleveland: Cleveland Museum of Art, 1951. "Milton Avery," exhibition catalog, Baltimore Museum of Art. Baltimore: Baltimore Museum of Art, 1952. "Goya." New York: Harry N. Abrams, 1954. "Hans Hofmann," exhibition catalog, UCLA Art Galleries. Los Angeles: Regents of the University of California, 1957. "Modigliani: Paintings and Drawings," exhibition catalog, Los Angeles County Museum and Museum of Fine Arts, Boston. Los Angeles: Committee on Fine Arts Productions, University of California, Los Angeles, 1961. "Bonne Fete Monsieur Picasso," exhibition catalog, UCLA Art Galleries. Los Angeles: Committee on Fine Arts Productions, University of California, Los Angeles, 1961. "Years of Ferment: The Birth of Twentieth Century Art: 1886–1914," exhibition catalog, UCLA Art Galleries. Los Angeles: UCLA Art Galleries, 1965. "Henri Matisse," exhibition catalog, UCLA Art Galleries. Los Angeles: UCLA Art Council and UCLA Art Galleries, 1966. "The Negro in American Art," exhibition catalog, UCLA Art Galleries. Los Angeles: UCLA Art Galleries, 1966. "New British Painting and Sculpture," exhibition catalog, Whitechapel Gallery. London: Whitechapel Gallery, 1968. "The Potent Image: Art in the Western World from Cave Paintings to the 1970s." New York: Collier Books, Division of Macmillan Publishing Inc., 1976.

== Novels ==
"South." New York: Farrar and Rinehart, Inc., 1935. "The Chronicle of Aaron Kane." New York: Farrar and Rinehart, Inc., 1936. "Youth in Trust." New York and Toronto: Farrar and Rinehart, Inc. 1937. "Inner Harbor." Boston: Little, Brown and Company, 1949. "Kindling." Boston: Little, Brown and Company, 1951. "Verge of Glory." New York: Harcourt Brace and Company, 1956.
