= John Rosenbaum =

American physicist and kinetic sculptor

John Rosenbaum (September 3, 1934 – September 30, 2003) was an American physicist, educator and kinetic sculptor, associated with the San Francisco Renaissance and the counterculture of the 1960s.

== Early life and education ==
Rosenbaum was born on September 3, 1934, in Brigantine, New Jersey. He attended Cornell University, where he graduated with a degree in engineering physics in 1957.

== Career ==
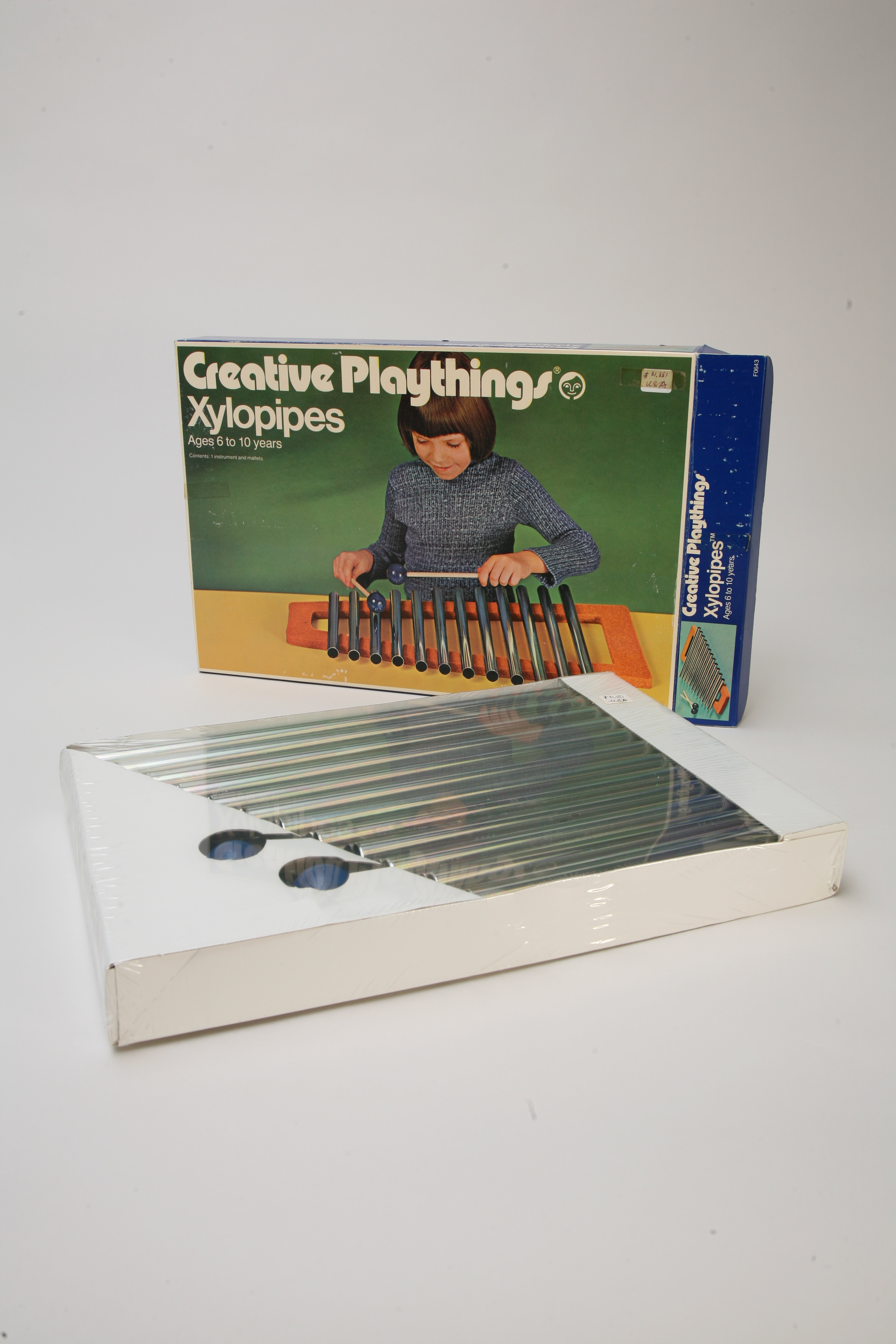
Xylopipes, designed by Rosenbaum for Creative Playthings, c. 1960s

After graduated from Cornell University in 1957, Rosenbaum moved to the San Francisco Bay Area in the early 1960s, where he contributed to the Harvard Project Physics textbooks. He was associated with the free school movement in the 1960s, and was a colleague of the educator Herbert Kohl, who described Rosenbaum's educational work in his book The Open Classroom and Math, Writing & Games in the Open Classroom. He designed the Xylopipes xylophone children's toy for Creative Playthings.

Rosenbaum created "Light Boxes", kinetic sculptures using polarized light and layers of cellophane laminated between pairs of rotating glass disks, producing changing patterns and colors similar to, and on a smaller scale than, light shows projected at rock concerts in the 1960s. He was exhibited by the Landau Gallery in Beverly Hills, among others. He was a colleague of silk screen artist Arthur Okamura. He designed the original logo for Herbie Mann's Embryo Records.

== Exhibitions ==
- 1969 Felix Landau Gallery, Los Angeles
- 1975 Walnut Creek, California (with Arthur Okamura)

== Death ==
Rosenbaum died in Alameda, California, on September 30, 2003, from complications of Parkinson's disease.
