= Felix Landau (art dealer) =

American art dealer (1924–2003)

Landau, at his Los Angeles gallery (date not known)

Felix Henry Landau (1924 – February 17, 2003) was an American art dealer whose Los Angeles gallery was a showcase for modern and contemporary art in the 1960s.

Landau was born in Vienna, the son of musician Fritz Landau. His family fled the Nazis and moved to New York City in 1938. He served in the U.S. Army in the Pacific Theater, where he met Pete Seeger and, after the war, became the folk singer's first manager.

He moved to Los Angeles in 1948, and in 1951 opened the Felix Landau Gallery on La Cienega Boulevard, which would become a central location for art galleries in the city. He introduced Egon Schiele and Gustav Klimt to Los Angeles, and featured California abstract painter John McLaughlin. He presented Francis Bacon's first show in Los Angeles, and held an exhibition of Peter Voulkos' work. Other artists featured in his gallery included Henry Moore, Sam Francis, Leon Goldin, John Levee, Paul Wonner, James Jarvaise, Richard Diebenkorn, William Dole, John Rosenbaum, Jack Zajac, Giacomo Benevelli, Giò Pomodoro, Gaston Lachaise and James Gill as one of the representatives of the early "Pop art".

A 1967 Los Angeles Times interview called him "the tastemaker of La Cienega." His clientele included Hollywood celebrities such as Billy Wilder, Jack Lemmon, Julie Andrews and Marlo Thomas.

In 1966 he also began operating the Landau-Alan (later Felix Landau) Gallery in New York City, which introduced David Hockney to the U.S.

In 1971 he closed his galleries and moved to Europe, working as a private dealer in Paris until his death.
