= Giacomo Benevelli =

Italian sculptor

Giacomo Benevelli (1925 – 13 July 2011) was an Italian-French sculptor. He was brought up in France. He lived and studied in Nice, Paris, Rome, Aix-en-Provence, and Munich. He mainly lived and worked for over forty years in Milan.

== Biography ==
Benevelli was born on 1925 in Reggio Emilia. He was the nephew of Anselmo Govi, a painter from Reggio Emilia, who painted the fresco of the dome of the Ariosto Theatre. Benevelli was a member of the Tiberina Academy, an ancient and prestigious institution founded in 1813 with the aim to promote Italian arts and letters; Antonio Canova and Marino Marini belonged to the same institution. Benevelli was awarded the Gold Medal of Merit in the Fine Arts by the Italian Government Presidency for his contributions to the arts.

Since 1957 Benevelli exhibited in Italy and worldwide. His first US exhibition was in 1963 at the Felix Landau Gallery in Los Angeles. In 1964 he was invited to the 42nd Venice Biennale with a group of sculptures.

In 1966 he was appointed as Head of Sculpture at the Accademia di Brera in Milan. Between the late 1960s and the early 1970s, he created a series of lamp-sculpture, the most famous is the Roto lamp (1970s) and Arabesque (late 1960s). In 2009 he started a collaboration with the worldwide design and furniture brand Natuzzi in the newly created Natuzzi Open Art, a space dedicated to the collaboration between art and design. Benevelli created a new line of art-objects which first premiered at the Cologne Trade Fair (imm Cologne Furniture and Design fair), Salone del Mobile (Milan International Design Fair) and at the AD Home Show in New York (2010).

In 1993, he realised a bronze sculpture called "Teleios", which can be seen in Piazzale Loreto in Milan.

In 2000, the city of Mantua organized a major exhibition of his works in the museum of the historical Casa del Mantegna. A book was published by Edizioni Casa del Mantegna on this occasion. In 2001, he exhibited his works in the historical Palazzo Isimbardi during an exhibition organized by the city of Milan. During the 2006 Winter Olympic Games in Turin, he was invited to take part at the Italian Sculpture Exhibition at the Palazzina di Stupinigi.

He realised a number of sacred art works for contemporary and ancient churches, and his works are preserved in numerous public and private collections in Italy and worldwide including at the Royal Museum of Fine Arts in Antwerp and at The British Museum in London.

Benevelli died on 13 July 2011 in Pavia, Italy.

== Bibliography ==
- Dalla Pietra all’Ago, Rizzoli, 1983
- Tre scultori di Milano, Kenjirō Azuma, Giacomo Benevelli, Giancarlo Marchese, 196?
- Azuma, Benevelli, Marchese: Galleria Mosaico, Chiasso, La Galleria, 1966
- Benevelli: sculture e disegni : Castello di Sartirana (Pavia), [2 giugno - 9 settembre 1990] Ed. "Centro Studi", 1990
- Sculture contemporanee nello spazio urbano: Kengiro Azuma, Iginio Balderi, Giacomo Benevelli, Gianfranco Pardi, Giò Pomodoro, Carlo Ramous, Mauro Staccioli. July 1973, Tipo-lito Nuova Step
- Giacomo Benevelli: forme, Andrea B. Del Guercio, editor S. Benevelli, Photography Cristina Cocullo, Translator R. A. Landon, Casa del Mantegna, 2000, ISBN 978-88-7943-022-7
- Giacomo Benevelli, Forme al Giardino Malaspina, Pavia - Malaspina Gardens, Pavia, exhibition catalogue, Rossana Bossaglia, Photos by Cristina Cocullo, 2001
- M. Hopkinson, Italian Prints 1875-1975 (2007), exhibition catalogue, 208 pp., 48 colour, 80 b&w illus. The British Museum, London
