= Henry Taylor (artist) =

American painter

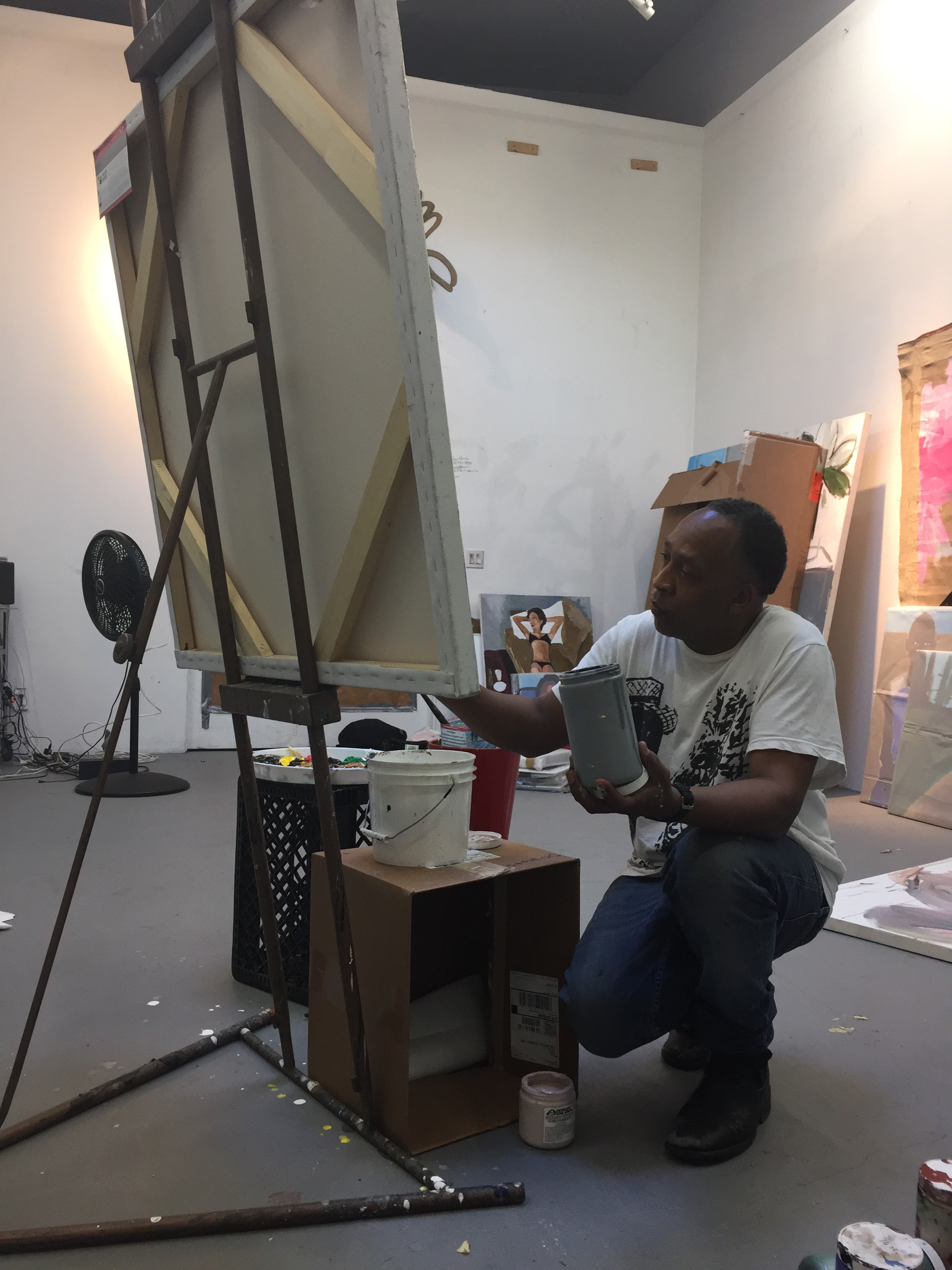
- Artist Henry Taylor working on a painting
- Born: 1958 (age 67–68); Ventura, California, U.S.
- Education: California Institute of the Arts
- Known for: Painting

Henry Taylor (born 1958) is an American artist and painter who lives and works in Los Angeles, California. He is best known for his acrylic paintings, mixed media sculptures, and installations.

== Life ==
Henry Taylor was born the youngest of eight brothers and sisters, which earned him the childhood nickname "Henry VIII" (which he still occasionally calls himself) in Ventura, California, to a father who was employed by the U.S. government as a commercial painter and is listed as a painter on Henry's birth certificate. Raised in Oxnard, California, Henry took art classes at Oxnard College under James Jarvaise, who became an ongoing mentor. His brother, Randy, was a founding member of the Ventura County chapter of the Black Panthers.

After 10 years of working as a psychiatric technician at Camarillo State Mental Hospital, Taylor retired in 1997. He attended the California Institute of the Arts, where in 1995, he obtained his Bachelor's of Fine Art.

Taylor has three children: Jade, Noah, and Epic. The youngest of which, Epic, Taylor had with artist Liz Glynn.

== Work ==
Taylor's largest output of work is in portraiture: he is known to paint obsessively, on various materials, including empty cigarette packs, detergent boxes, cereal boxes, suitcases, crates, bottles, furniture, and stretched canvas. His subjects include family, friends, patients (when employed at the hospital), acquaintances, strangers, waitresses, celebrities, homeless people, himself, historical figures, cultural figures, sports heroes, politicians, and individuals from photographs or other art works. At times, Taylor collapses time periods and spaces, as in Cicely and Miles Visit the Obamas (2017): in this work, Cicely Tyson and Miles Davis—painted after a famous photograph of the couple from 1968—are seen in front of the White House, alluding to their imaginary visit to the Obamas. Taylor's painterly style has been variously described as sensuous, vibrant, bold, fast and loose, full of empathy, generosity, and love, and the visual equivalent to blues music, while retaining a profound critical social sensibility. His work has been lauded for maintaining an impossible balance between careful and sophisticated art-world references with a seemingly spontaneous and natural expressiveness. Taylor's oeuvre has been aligned within various American lineages, including the portraiture tradition of Alice Neel, and the work of Harlem Renaissance painters such as Jacob Lawrence and Romare Bearden, and compared with his peer Kerry James Marshall.

One of Taylor's more recent works, The Times Ain't A Changing, Fast Enough! captures the events of the shooting of Philando Castile, who was shot and killed in his own car with his girlfriend and 4-year-old.

Taylor showed work that delved into the old practice of the Master's Golf Tournament using Black only caddies in a show titled: "Disappeared, but A Tiger Showed Up, Later" at Hauser & Wirth, Southampton.

== Exhibitions ==
Taylor's important exhibitions include a mid-career retrospective at MoMA PS1, along with solo exhibitions at the Studio Museum in Harlem, Artpace, and the Santa Monica Museum of Art, along with group exhibitions at the Whitney Museum of American Art, the Corcoran Gallery of Art, the Museum of Contemporary Art, Los Angeles, the Hammer Museum, the Carnegie Museum of Art, the Rubell Museum, and the Bruce High Quality Foundation.

In 2023, he was an Artist-in-Residence at the Fabric Workshop Museum in Philadelphia, in which he presented the solo show Henry Taylor: Nothing Change, Nothing Strange. Also in 2023, Taylor collaborated with rapper and music businessman Pharrell Williams on designs for the 2024 Spring Season men's collection for luxury brand Louis Vuitton.

The exhibit Henry Taylor: B Side was exhibited at the Whitney Museum of American Art in Manhattan from October 4, 2023 to January 28, 2024. From November 6, 2022 to April 30, 2023, it was at The Museum of Contemporary Art (MOCA) in Los Angeles. Exhibition Catalogue Coinciding with the retrospective of the at the Whitney Museum of American Art, Taylor has been honored as the artist whose works were first presented at the inaugural exhibition of Hauser & Wirth's Paris gallery in Paris in October, 2024.

From April 8 to September 6, 2026, the Musée Picasso-Paris will exhibit Henry Taylor: Where Thoughts Provoke that explores the breath of Taylor’s works and is Taylor’s first retrospective in France.

== Permanent collections ==
His works are included in the permanent collections of prestigious institutions in the United States such as Pérez Art Museum Miami, Carnegie Museum of Art, the Museum of Modern Art, New York, San Francisco Museum of Modern Art, the J. Paul Getty Museum, the Pinault Collection, Institute of Contemporary Art/Boston, and Hammer Museum at University of California, Los Angeles, among many others.

=== Awards ===
He was awarded the Robert De Niro, Sr. Prize for his achievements in painting.

== Art market ==
Taylor has been represented by Hauser & Wirth since 2020. Until 2025, he also worked with Blum & Poe in Los Angeles.

== Quotes ==
“I paint everyone, or I try to. I try to capture the moment I am with someone who could be my friend, a neighbor, a celebrity, or a homeless person.”

"It takes courage to do a lot of things. But, in a way, it doesn’t actually take courage, because you are free to do it. It’s like jumping in the water. The water’s cold, but you just jump in. You’ve gotta just jump in all the fucking time."
