= Elizabeth Patterson (artist) =

American Photorealist artist (born 1954)

Elizabeth Patterson (born 1954) is an American Photorealist artist whose color pencil drawings portray intricate and abstracted landscapes, often emphasizing the subjective quality that water brings to a composition.

== Background ==
Originally from Pennsylvania, Elizabeth Patterson went on to earn a Bachelor of Fine Arts at Minneapolis College of Art and Design and relocated to the Los Angeles area in 1979. She worked in a variety of mediums and styles with a penchant for graphite and color pencil rendering. Patterson earned recognition from an early age, but her success as an emerging artist came to a halt in 1984 due to a severe injury that resulted in the complete loss of use of her drawing hand. The injury necessitated two years of intensive therapy treatment, and left Patterson uncertain that she would ever draw again. Consequently, she put her artistic pursuits aside and embarked on a different career path.

== Rediscovering art ==
Patterson traveled to Hawaii in 1986 where she explored the undersea world. Little did she know, the visual impressions of this trip were committed to memory and would resurface many years later to inspire her color pencil drawings. Thirteen years later, her partner insisted that she return to her art career, and she was surprised to learn that her gift for drawing was still present despite her injury. The result was a series of aquatic drawings that catapulted the artist back into the world of creativity.

== Present ==
"Patterson's unique expression of Photorealism is both incredibly realistic and simultaneously dreamlike, wavering between abstraction and hyperrealism."

She spoke about her art and process in an interview by Galerie Louis Carré.

Patterson's 2010 exhibition at Louis Stern Fine Arts earned her a glowing review by Los Angeles Times critic, David Pagel

Elizabeth Patterson is represented by CK Contemporary and Thomas Paul Fine Art.

== Exhibitions ==
- 2001 Colored Pencil Society of America – 9th International Juried Exhibition, San Francisco, CA
- 2002 Colored Pencil Society of America – 10th International Juried Exhibition, Ft. Worth, TX
- 2003 Colored Pencil Society of America – 11th International Juried Exhibition, Brea, CA
- 2004 Color Pencil Society of America – 12th International Juried Exhibition, Memphis, TN
- 2005 Colored Pencil Society of America – Explore This! 3, La Jolla Ca.
- 2006 Colored Pencil Society of America – 14th Juried Exhibition, Albuquerque, NM.
- 2006 CPSA Signature Showcase, Cornell Museum of Art and History, Del Ray Beach, FL.
- 2006 The Human Element, Dunedin Creative Arts Center, Dunedin, FL.
- 2007 California Open Exhibition, TAG Gallery, Santa Monica, CA
- 2007 Colored Pencil Society of America - 15th International Juried
- 2008 In the Eye of the Beholder: Contemporary Drawings, Louis Stern Fine Arts, West Hollywood, CA
- 2008 Colored Pencil Society of America - 16th International Juried Exhibition, Seattle, WA
- 2009 Colored Pencil Society of America - 17th International Juried Exhibition, Atlanta, GA
- 2009 Colored Pencil Society of America — Explore This! 5, Online Exhibition
- 2010 Colored Pencil Society of America - 18th International Juried Exhibition, Loa Gatos, CA
- 2010 Chasing the Rain — Drawings by Elizabeth Patterson, Louis Stern Fine Arts, West Hollywood, CA
- 2010 Los Angeles Art Show, presented by the Fine Art Dealers Association, Louis Stern Fine Arts, Los Angeles, CA
- 2011 Splash, Carnegie Art Museum, Oxnard CA
- 2011 Houston Fine Art Fair, Louis Stern Fine Arts, Houston, TX
- 2011 Art Aspen, Louis Stern Fine Arts, Aspen Colorado
- 2011 Los Angeles Art Show, presented by the Fine Art Dealers Association, Louis Stern Fine Arts, Los Angeles, CA
- 2011 Influential Element: Depictions of Water, Long Beach Museum of Art, Long Beach, CA
- 2012 Elizabeth Patterson: Imagining the Rain, Galerie Louis Carré, Paris, France
- 2013 The National Weather Center Biennale Exhibition, National Weather Center, Norman, OK.
- 2014 Photorealism: The Everyday Illuminated, Jonathan Novak Contemporary Art, Los Angeles, California
- 2015 Important Works on Paper, Jonathan Novak Contemporary Art
- 2016 Elizabeth Patterson: The Abstraction of Reality, Galerie Louis Carré, Paris, France.
- 2016 Elizabeth Patterson: Paris and Other Places, Louis Stern Fine Arts, Los Angeles, CA
- 2017 The National Weather Center Biennale Exhibition, National Weather Center, Norman, OK.
- 2017 Summer Group Show, Thomas Paul Fine Art, West Hollywood, CA.
