= Matsumi Kanemitsu =

Japanese-American painter

- Born: 1922; Ogden, Utah, U.S.
- Died: 1992 (aged 69–70); Los Angeles, California, U.S.
- Other name: "Mike" Kanemitsu
- Occupation: Artist
- Known for: Hard-edge painting, abstract expressionist painting, lithography
- Partner(s): Nancy Uyemura (1980s-his death, 1992)
- Website: https://www.matsumikanemitsu.com

Landscape by Matsumi Kanemitsu, 1967, Honolulu Museum of Art

Matsumi "Mike" Kanemitsu (May 28, 1922 – May 11, 1992) was a Japanese-American painter who was also proficient in Japanese style sumi and lithography.

== Early life ==
Kanemitsu was born to Japanese parents in Ogden, Utah on May 28, 1922. At age three, he was taken to Japan and grew up in a suburb of Hiroshima with his grandparents. He returned to the United States in 1940 and enlisted in the United States Army in 1941 at Fort Douglas, at which point he renounced his Japanese citizenship and became solely an American citizen. He was arrested after the attack on Pearl Harbor and interrogated then released. In the following years he was detained in army camps in the Midwest (including Fort Douglas, Utah, and Fort Riley). While incarcerated, he began drawing portraits and decorating with supplies provided by the American Red Cross. After his release, Kanemitsu volunteered for service overseas and served as a hospital assistant in France.

== Career ==
In 1946, Kanemitsu was discharged from the Army and undertook formal art education with Fernand Léger in Paris, with Karl Metzler in Baltimore, and with Yasuo Kuniyoshi at the Art Students League of New York beginning in 1951. Among the jobs he took to support himself while in art school was a position as director of entertainment in a Baltimore gambling hall, where he oversaw the striptease dancers.

Though he painted representational works in the early 1950s, Kanemitsu is generally considered a second-generation abstract expressionist. Later in the 1950s, with the support of Frank O'Hara and Harold Rosenberg, he was able to show his work at the Museum of Modern Art, the Whitney Museum, and the Radich Gallery. He is best known for his non-objective paintings, which are often hard-edge.

While at the Art Students League he associated with artists such as Paul Jenkins, Warren Brandt, Jackson Pollock, Lee Krasner, Robert Motherwell, Willem and Elaine de Kooning, and others. By 1958 he was firmly entrenched in abstract expressionism and was close with Norman Bluhm. In the 1950s and early 60s he received two Longview Foundation awards and a Ford Foundation Fellowship to practice lithography at the Tamarind Lithography Workshop in Los Angeles.

=== Los Angeles ===
He moved to Los Angeles in 1961, in part due to his dislike of the rise of Pop Art in New York, and was on the faculty of Chouinard Art Institute from 1965 to 1970, California Institute of the Arts from 1970 to 1971, and the Otis College of Art and Design from 1971 to 1983. In 1990, along with fellow artist Nancy Uyemura and two dealers from Japan, he opened Gallery IV, which showed both local Los Angeles artists and Japanese artists. Kanemitsu died of lung cancer at his home in Los Angeles on May 11, 1992.

== Legacy ==
In 2018, Kanemitsu's former home at 800 Traction Avenue in Los Angeles was set to be landmarked by the city, but controversy erupted over the erasure of its history as the home of a number of Japanese-American artists, including Kanemitsu.

Kanemitsu's work is represented by Louis Stern Fine Arts.

== Selected Public Collections ==
- Akron Art Museum, Akron, Ohio
- Art Institute of Chicago, Chicago, Illinois
- Baltimore Museum of Art, Baltimore, Maryland
- Benton Museum of Art at Pomona College, Claremont, California
- Berkeley Art Museum and Pacific Film Archive, University of California, Berkeley, California
- Cantor Arts Center, Stanford University, Palo Alto, California
- Cincinnati Museum of Art, Cincinnati, Ohio
- Detroit Institute of Arts, Detroit, Michigan
- Grunewald Center for the Graphic Arts, Hammer Museum, UCLA, Los Angeles, California
- Hiroshima Prefectural Art Museum, Hiroshima, Japan
- Hiroshima City Museum of Contemporary Art, Hiroshima, Japan
- Indianapolis Museum of Art, Indianapolis, Indiana
- Krannert Art Museum, University of Illinois Urbana-Champaign, Champaign, Illinois
- Los Angeles County Museum of Art, Los Angeles, California
- Madison Museum of Contemporary Art, Madison, Wisconsin
- Metropolitan Museum of Art, New York, New York
- Museum of Contemporary Art, San Diego, California
- Museum of Contemporary Art, Tokyo, Japan
- Museum of Modern Art, New York, New York
- National Gallery of Art, Canberra, Australia
- National Gallery of Art, Washington, D.C.
- National Museum of Modern Art, Tokyo, Japan
- National Museum of Art, Osaka, Japan
- National Museum of Wales, Cardiff, Wales
- New Mexico Museum of Art, Santa Fe, New Mexico
- Norah Eccles Harrison Museum of Art, University of Utah, Logan, Utah
- Norton Simon Museum of Art, Pasadena, California
- Oklahoma City Art Museum, Oklahoma City, Oklahoma
- San Francisco Museum of Modern Art, San Francisco, California
- Smithsonian American Art Museum, Washington, D.C.
- Santa Barbara Museum of Art, Santa Barbara, California
