= Julius Schmid (painter) =

Austrian painter (1854–1935)

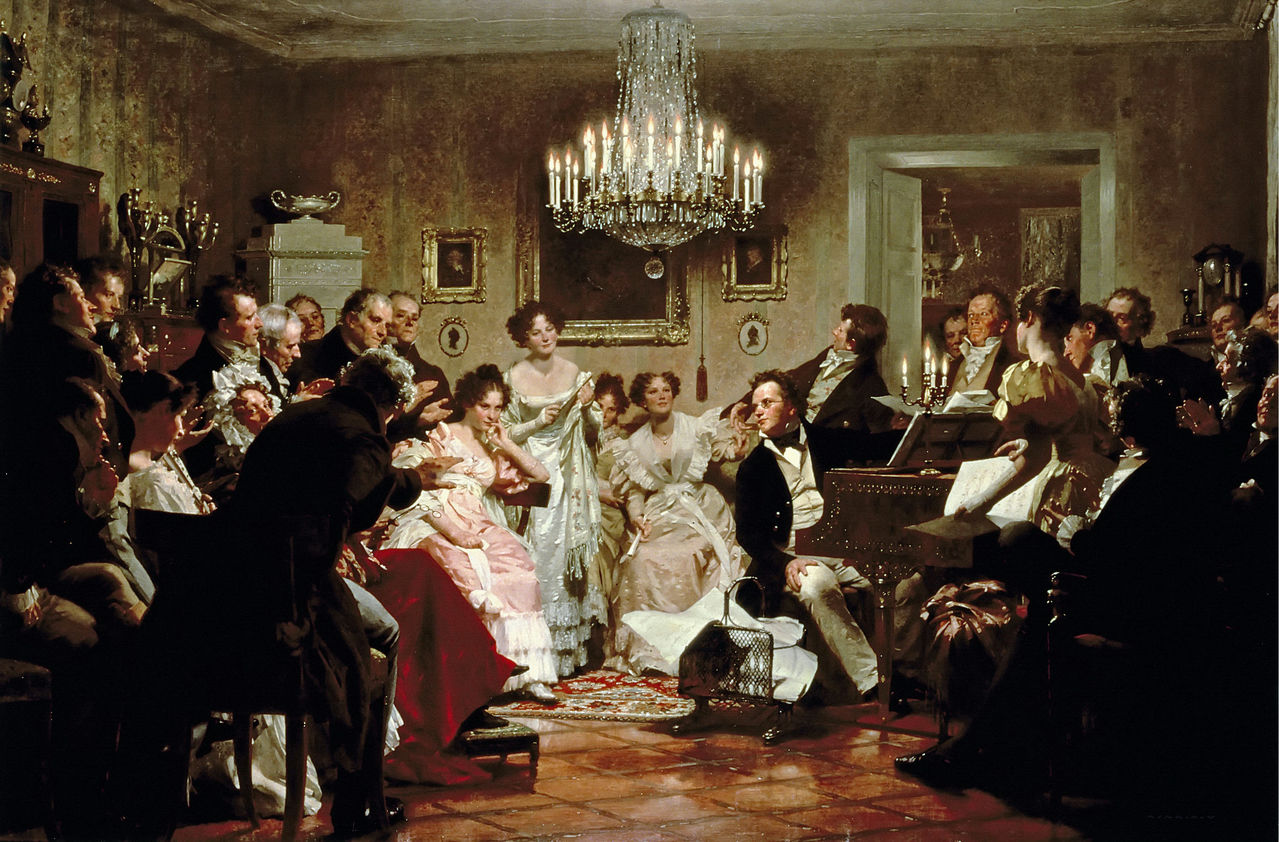
Julius Schmid's Schubertiade, 1896

Julius Schmid (1854–1935) was a Viennese painter best known by his painting of Franz Schubert, Schubertiade (also known as Schubertabend). He fell into obscurity in the 20th century.

== Biography ==
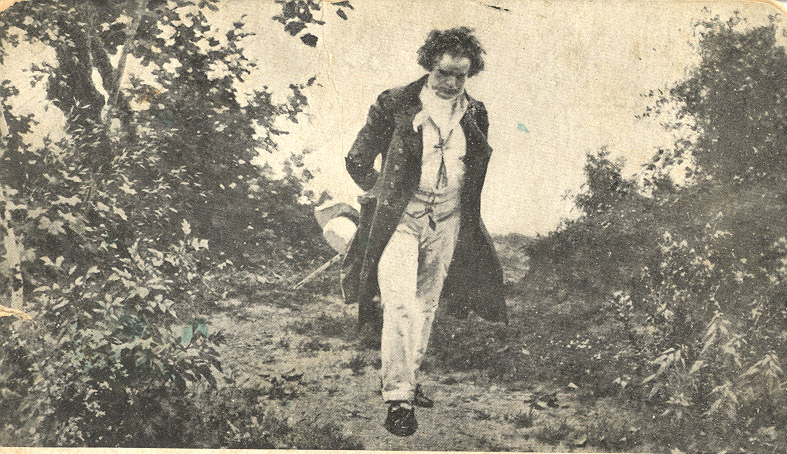
Beethoven's walk in nature, by Julius Schmid

Schmid was born in Vienna, and studied at the local Academy of Fine Arts for seven years. He won the Prix de Rome in 1878, which allowed him to study there for two years, after which he decided to travel around Italy to improve his craft. He was taught briefly by Hans Makart, who also taught Gustav Klimt.

Schmid's painting of Beethoven was used as the cover image of the 18 March 1927 issue of The Radio Times.
