= Alfredo Ramos Martínez =

Mexican artist (1871–1946)

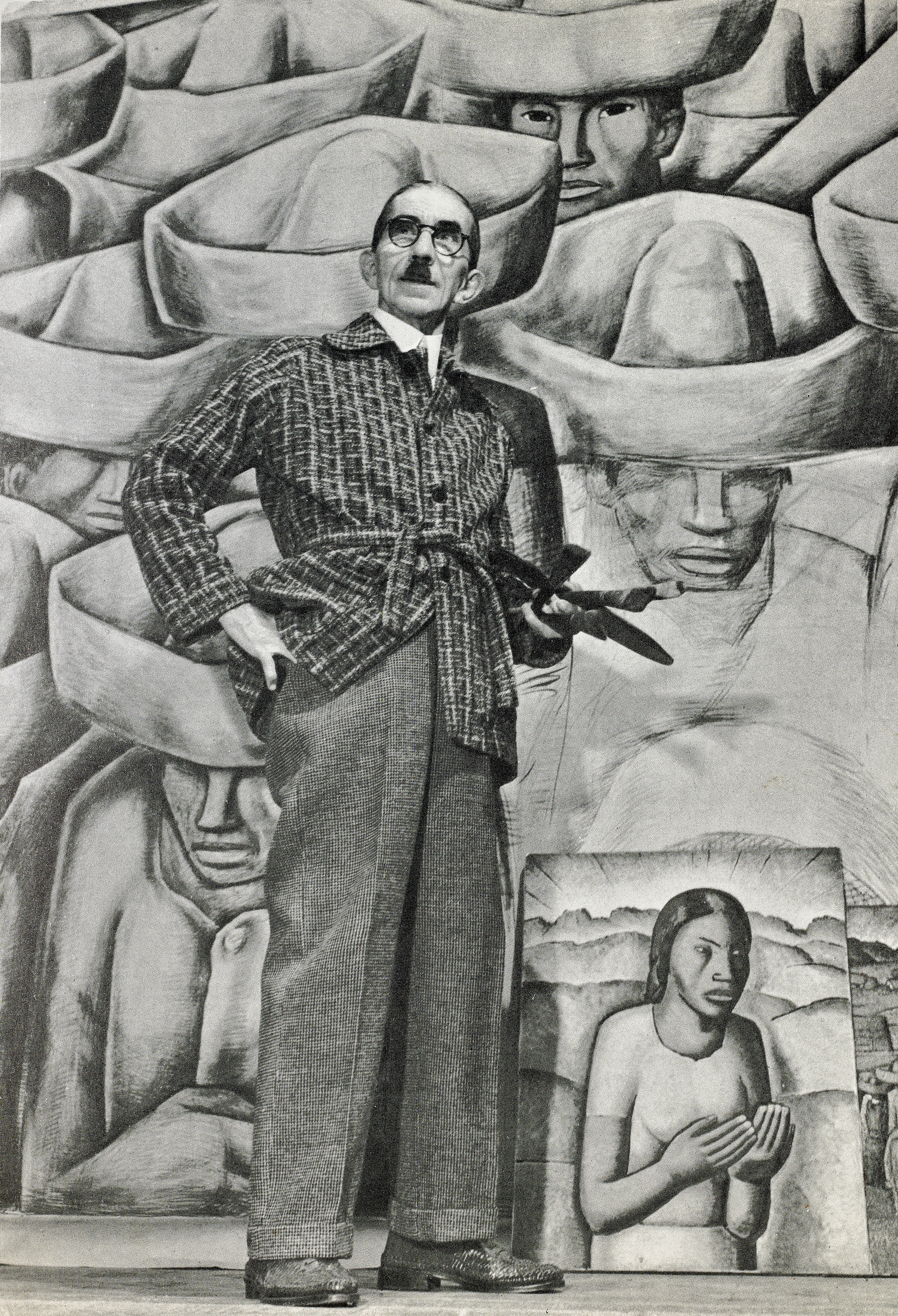
- Alfredo Ramos Martínez in Los Angeles, 1941. In the background, a drawing for the unexecuted mural, Los Charros del Pueblo.
- Born: November 12, 1871; Monterrey, Nuevo León, Mexico
- Died: November 8, 1946 (aged 74); Los Angeles
- Education: Academia Nacional de Bellas Artes, Mexico City
- Known for: Painting, Fresco, Murals, Drawing, Watercolor, Printmaking
- Notable work: Margaret Fowler Frescoes (1945; unfinished), Scripps College, Claremont, California
- Movement: Modernism, Mexican muralism, Figurative art, Portraiture, Impressionism
- Awards: Grand Cross of the Order of Leopold (Belgium), 1923
- Patrons: Phoebe Hearst, (San Francisco); William Alanson Bryan (Los Angeles); Harold Grieve (Los Angeles); Albert M. Bender (San Francisco)

Alfredo Ramos Martínez (November 12, 1871 – November 8, 1946) was a painter, muralist, and educator, who lived and worked in Mexico, Paris, and Los Angeles. Considered by many to be the 'Father of Mexican Modernism', Ramos Martínez is best known for his serene and empathetic paintings of traditional Mexican people and scenes. As the renowned Nicaraguan poet Rubén Darío wrote, "Ramos Martínez is one of those who paints poems; he does not copy, he interprets; he understands how to express the sorrow of the fisherman and the melancholy of the village."

== Early years 1880–1900 ==
Ramos Martínez was born in 1871 in Monterrey, Nuevo León, the ninth child of Jacobo Ramos and his wife Luisa Martínez. His father was a successful merchant trading in jewelry, fine fabrics, silver, embroidered suits and hand-woven sarapes from Saltillo. All members of the Ramos Martínez family were involved with their father's business and it was expected that the artist, too, would one day join the ranks of "honorable merchant". However, Ramos Martínez's evident talent and instincts propelled him towards a career in the arts; a choice that his family ultimately supported.

At the age of nine, one of Ramos Martínez's drawings, a portrait of the governor of Monterrey was sent to an exhibition in San Antonio, Texas, and won first prize. A portion of that prize included a scholarship to study at the most prestigious art school in all of Mexico, the Academia Nacional de Bellas Artes (Academy of Fine Arts) in Mexico City. Thus the entire Ramos Martínez family relocated to Coyoacán, a small town on the outskirts of Mexico City.

From an early age Ramos Martínez was recognized as prodigiously talented. As a student, his preferred medium was watercolor and he won numerous awards for his achievements. Though he found the teaching methods at the Academy repressive and counter-intuitive to his more emotional plein air impulses, Ramos Martínez created a significant body of work that he was able to sell while still a student. Gratifying as his youthful accomplishments were, the news from France, and the examples of the brilliance of the Impressionist and Post-Impressionist artists, persuaded the young painter that he needed to be in Europe to continue his education and define his career. Though his family was by no means poor, they did not have funds to support Ramos Martínez's European dream.

In a supreme bit of good fortune, Phoebe Hearst attended a dinner in Mexico City for the President of Mexico, Porfirio Díaz, which featured place mats designed and painted by the young Ramos Martínez. Hearst was so impressed with the decoration that she asked to meet the artist and see other examples of his work. After their meeting, she not only bought all of Ramos Martínez's watercolors, but agreed to provide financial support for the artist's continued study in Paris.

== Paris 1901–1910 ==
Ramos Martínez's arrival in Paris in 1900 coincided with further development of the Post-Impressionist movement. He was able to see firsthand the work of Paul Gauguin, Vincent van Gogh, Henri Matisse, Claude Monet, Georges Seurat and Odilon Redon. Furthermore, Hearst's monthly stipend of 500 francs, combined with Ramos Martínez's fluent French, afforded him a comfortable lifestyle and the ability to travel throughout Europe.

While in Paris, Ramos Martínez attended various artistic and literary salons and made the acquaintance of the modernist Nicaraguan poet, Rubén Darío. Darío and Ramos Martínez became close friends, thus insuring Ramos Martínez 's inclusion in a circle of rather extraordinary bon vivants such as Isadora Duncan, Paul Verlaine, Eleonora Duse, Rémy de Gourmont and Anna Pavlova.

Darío wrote at length about the painterly and literary ideas that defined the creative output of both artists during those years. The two sojourned to Belgium and Holland to study the works of Rembrandt and Van Gogh. The artist's works from this period are strongly influenced by the somber tonalities of the Dutch sky and sea.

Also, it was in Brittany, that Ramos Martínez began painting and drawing on newspapers, a material/medium he used to superb effect during his years in California. When the artist discovered he had run out of drawing paper, he asked the concierge at the inn where he was staying during a holiday weekend if he had any paper suitable for drawing. The gentleman offered him discarded newspapers in abundance.

In 1905, Ramos Martínez began participating in the yearly Salon d'Automne in Paris, perhaps the most important of all the salons of that era. Within a year of his first showing there, his painting Le Printemps was awarded the Gold medal.

However, after this great acknowledgment, Hearst decided she would no longer give him his monthly stipend and Ramos Martínez began the struggle of earning his living as an artist.

Ramos Martínez showed at a number of galleries in Paris. One of the leading art critics of the day, Camille Mauclair wrote that the work of Ramos Martínez was in the same class as the finest Impressionist landscapes exhibited in Paris. Though sales of his artwork were proceeding, and Ramos Martínez had achieved a degree of comfort as a 'Parisian', in 1909 he felt a strong desire to return home to Mexico.

== Mexico 1910–1929 ==
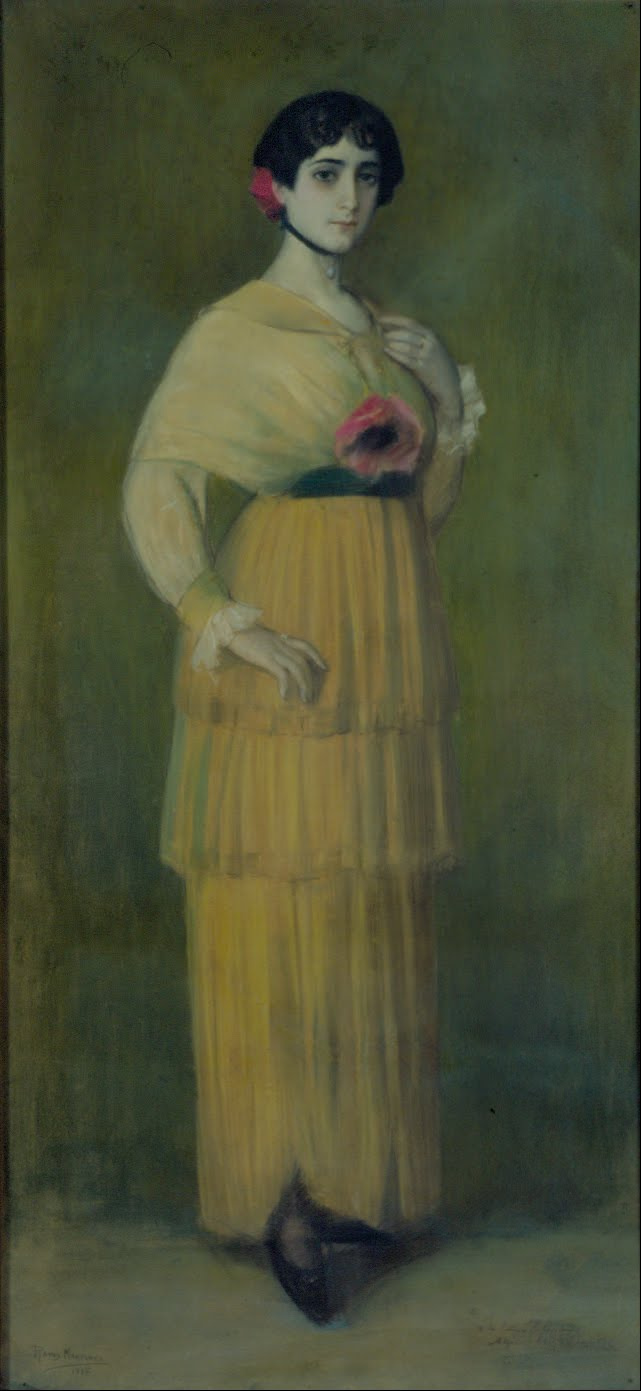
Portrait of Belinda Palavicini. 1915. Pastel on paper. 187 × 87 cm. Museo Nacional de Arte.

By the time Ramos Martínez arrived in early 1910, Mexico was a nation in turmoil. The Mexican Revolution was beginning in earnest and the 30-year rule of President Porfirio Díaz was on the verge of collapse due to the pressure of the political reforms of Francisco I. Madero. Within a year of the President's resignation in 1911, the art students at the National Academy called a strike in order to protest the 'aesthetic dictatorship' of the Academy. They demanded the establishment of a 'Free Academy' and proposed Ramos Martínez as director. Hailed as a distinguished alumnus, a bona fide European success, and sympathetic to the students' cause, Ramos Martínez became first the assistant Director and, by 1913, the Director of the Academy.

As Director, Ramos Martínez was able to open the first of his Open Air Schools of Painting. The first school was established in the Santa Anita Iztapalapa borough of Mexico City with an initial class of 10 students, including David Alfaro Siqueiros and Federico Cantú, who would later become successful artists in their own right. By 1914, Ramos Martínez stepped down as Director of the Academy but opened another Open Air School in Coyoacán. That same year, his students' work was featured in the "Exhibition of Works from Public and Art Schools" at the Spanish Pavilion and met with extremely favorable response.

The political situation in Mexico remained extremely volatile for the next decade and by 1920 Ramos Martínez was reinstated as Director of the Academy. Despite all the politics, the Open Air Schools flourished and Ramos Martínez was acknowledged as a true innovator in the Mexican art world and frequently called the 'Father of Modern Mexican Art'.

Ramos Martínez' art pedagocial ideas were introduced in Japan by the Japanese painter Tamiji Kitagawa, who worked as a teacher at the Open Air Schools in Tlalpan and Taxco during the 1920s and 1930s, and became an influential figure in the liberal art education movement in postwar Japan.

While Ramos Martínez invested most of his energy in teaching and the establishment of his Open Air Schools, he also continued his own work as a painter. In 1923, he was awarded the Grand Cross of the Order of Leopold by King Albert I of Belgium in recognition of his contributions to the visual arts.

In 1928, Ramos Martínez married Maria de Sodi Romero of Oaxaca. Their daughter, Maria was born one year later, suffering from a crippling bone disease. Ramos Martínez resigned as Director of the Academy and sought treatment for his daughter's condition. During his stay at the border between Mexico and the United States, where Ramos Martínez was in Ensenada, Baja California, waiting for the American consulate to approve his immigration visa to the United States to bring his daughter with health problems to the latter country, he was hired to create murals and portraits at Playa Ensenada, hotel and casino. Many of the murals and paintings that still decorate the walls and ceilings of the old former hotel, were characterized by their geometric, Renaissance, and medieval features, which gave a touch of exaltation to the highly decorated tourist complex. The family first traveled to the Mayo Clinic in Rochester, Minnesota, and eventually settled in the milder climate of Los Angeles, with Maria under the care of Dr. John A. Wilson.

== California 1930–1946 ==
Having relocated to Los Angeles in 1929, Ramos Martínez was offered an exhibition by William Alanson Bryan, Director of the Los Angeles County Museum of Art (LACMA) at Exposition Park.

Warner Brothers art director and interior decorator to the stars Harold Grieve acquired a number of works by the artist and championed the artist's work to his clients. Noted film directors Ernst Lubitsch and Alfred Hitchcock, costume designer Edith Head, screenwriter Jo Swerling, and actors Charles Laughton, Gary Cooper, James Stewart, and Beulah Bondi, among others, were collectors.

Ramos Martínez was also exhibited with great success in San Diego at the Fine Arts Gallery of Balboa Park and in San Francisco at the California Palace of the Legion of Honor. It was there that celebrated Bay Area art patron Albert M. Bender first saw Ramos Martínez's work. Bender became a lifelong friend of the artist and acquired numerous works for his personal collection. Furthermore, he purchased and donated Ramos Martínez works to several San Francisco institutions, including the Legion of Honor, the San Francisco Museum of Art, the California Historical Society, and Mills College.

In addition to his mastery of all conventional media including drawing, printmaking, watercolor, and easel painting, Ramos Martínez was an extremely skilled muralist who excelled in the technically challenging art of traditional fresco painting. Though a number of his murals were destroyed, including those at the Chapman Park Hotel in Los Angeles (adjacent to the famous Brown Derby Restaurant) and the Normal School for Teachers (Escuela Normal) in Mexico City, several important examples have survived. These include the Chapel of the Santa Barbara Cemetery (1934); the La Avenida Café, Coronado, California (1938) (later restored and moved to the Coronado Public Library); and the unfinished fresco project, The Flower Vendors in the Margaret Fowler Garden at Scripps College, Claremont, California (1945). The Scripps mural was commissioned by the College at the urging of Millard Sheets, the much loved California artist and long-time admirer of Ramos Martínez. Another fresco, one of Ramos Martínez' most significant works, the La Guelaguetza, which was named after the ancient Oaxacan celebration of the Earth's abundance, was commissioned in 1933 by screenwriter Jo Swerling for his Beverly Hills home. Having fallen into obscurity for many years it was rescued before demolition of the residence in 1990.

Alfredo Ramos Martínez died unexpectedly at the age of 73 on November 8, 1946, in Los Angeles. He was buried at Holy Cross Cemetery in Culver City, California. At the time of his death, Ramos Martínez was working on a series of murals entitled "The Flower Vendors" at Scripps College. The unfinished murals have been preserved as a tribute to the artist.

== Recent history ==
After the artist's death, the Dalzell Hatfield Gallery in Los Angeles continued to showcase his paintings and drawings. Maria Sodi de Ramos Martínez, the artist's widow, saw to it that Ramos Martínez was included in numerous gallery exhibitions. Until her death in 1985, she was the primary champion of her late husband's work.

In 1991, Louis Stern presented the first major retrospective of the artist's work since his death. The exhibition, "Alfredo Ramos Martínez (1872–1946)," was on view at Louis Stern Galleries in Beverly Hills from October 1, 1991, through January 6, 1992. This exhibition was the foundation of the monumental Ramos Martínez exhibition, "Alfredo Ramos Martínez (1871–1946), Une Visión Retrospectiva," at Mexico City's renowned Museo Nacional de Arte (MUNAL) in April 1992.

These two exhibitions became the cornerstones of a re-examination of Ramos Martínez's work and subsequent development of a secondary market for these works. As with the other major Mexican modernists, indigenous peoples were the principal subjects in the mature works of Ramos Martínez. In recent years, several of these paintings have realized high prices on the international art market. His 1938 painting Flowers of Mexico brought over $4 million at Christie's, New York in May 2007.

== The Alfredo Ramos Martinez Research Project ==
Louis Stern Fine Arts began a public association with Mexican modernist Alfredo Ramos Martinez in 1991 with a retrospective exhibition of works by the artist, who lived in Los Angeles from 1929 until his death, in 1946. In collaboration with his daughter, Maria Martinez Bolster, and art historian Margarita Nieto, the gallery subsequently established the Alfredo Ramos Martinez Research Project to "protect the artist's legacy and to advance the understanding and appreciation of the artist whom many have deemed the father of Mexican Modern Art." The Research Project published a monograph, Alfredo Ramos Martinez & Modernismo, by Margarita Nieto and Louis Stern in 2009, and is currently compiling a catalogue raisonné of the artist's paintings and frescos.

== See also ==
- Mexican muralism
- Mexican art
- Rosario Cabrera
