= Decorative Impressionism =

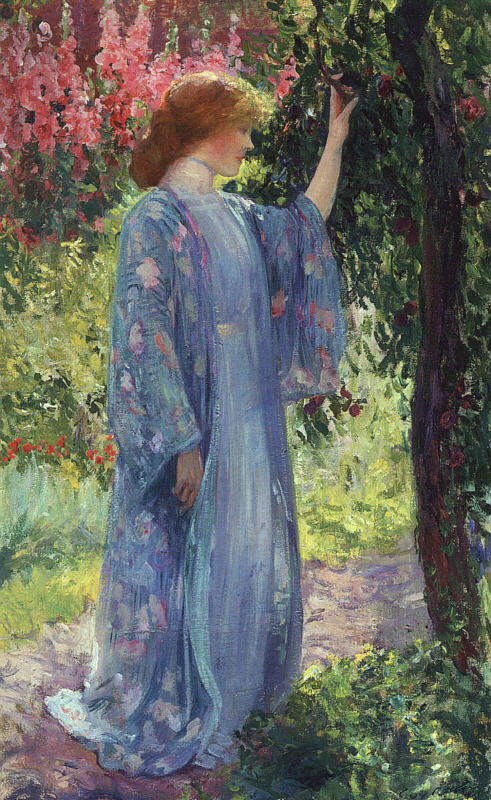
Guy Rose. The Blue Kimono. His work has been termed Decorative Impressionism.

Decorative Impressionism is an art historical term that is credited to the art writer Christian Brinton, who first used it in 1911. Brinton titled an article on the American expatriate painter Frederick Carl Frieseke, one of the members of the famous Giverny Colony of American Impressionists, "The Decorative Impressionist."

However, use of the term has been revived in recent decades by the influential and prolific art historian William H. Gerdts to describe the figurative works of not only Frieseke, but some of his Giverny compatriots including Richard E. Miller, Louis Ritman and Robert Reid. The same term has been applied to other Giverny school painters who painted the figure including Guy Rose, Karl Anderson and Karl Albert Buehr. Decorative Impressionism describes a way of painting the human figure that attempts to reconcile academic techniques with Impressionist and Post-Impressionist influences.

The works of these artists tend to be either high-key outdoor depictions of women in languid poses, or interior scenes with the figures illuminated by natural light from windows. Many of these highly decorative paintings have a recognizable influence from Japanese art or Japonisme, with the strong use of patterns in the backgrounds. The work of the originators of first Decorative Impressionists was popular from about 1905 until the mid-1920s, but the style continued until at least the middle of the 20th century through the work of some of the students of the Giverny painters and, the style has been revived in recent years by some contemporary figurative painters.

== Giverny ==
While American artists had been painting in the small village of Giverny since the 1880s, the group of painters who developed the characteristic style known as Decorative Impressionism settled in Normandy after the turn of the 20th century. They came to a similar way of working because their academic training was similar; they were aware and interested in the developments of French Impressionism and Post-Impressionism; and wanted to adopt some elements from these movements into their own work. Each of them had their own way of working, their own degree of solidity on their figures and their own style of brushwork, but they were all joined together by the beauty of their subjects and their decorative approach.

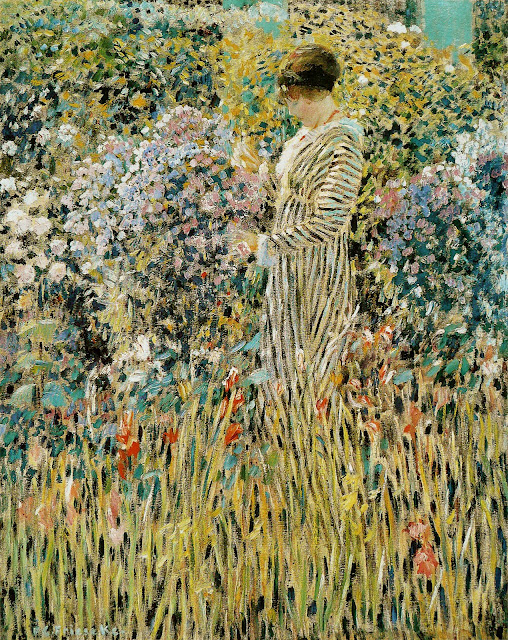
Frederick Frieseke. Lady in a Garden.

Frederick Frieseke was a Michigan born and Chicago-trained artist who had studied in Paris. The American expatriate settled in Giverny in 1906 where he painted female figures in outdoor settings, often using a pastel palette. Influenced by Renoir, Frieseke's canvasses were carefully designed and he often juxtaposed one pattern against another. Richard Edward Miller was raised and trained in St. Louis, Missouri and he studied in France at the Académie Julian briefly before his first large figurative works paintings were accepted in the Paris Salon. His early works featured well-drawn figures with more loosely rendered backgrounds, but after he settled in Giverny, his work became brighter and he developed a style where his figures were well modeled, but the backgrounds were often patterns of small brush strokes.

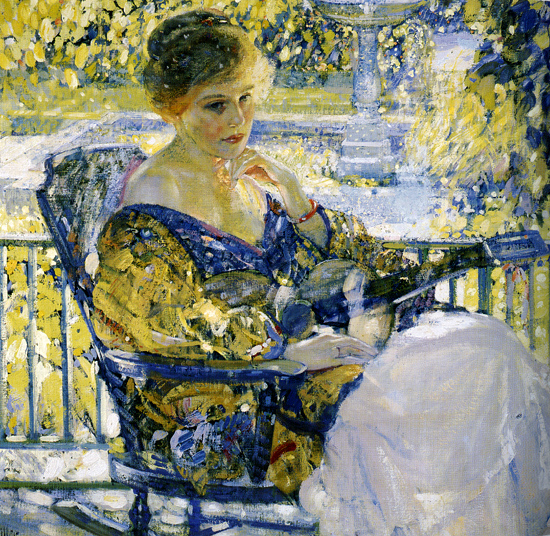
Richard E. Miller. Girl with a Guitar (Daydreams) (1916-17).

The California-born artist Guy Rose studied in San Francisco and Paris, coming first under the influence of the Naturalist School and then French Impressionism. He is often described as the most French of the California Impressionists and he visited Giverny before finally settling there with his wife Ethel in 1904. Rose was both a landscape and figurative painter and in Giverny, he painted female figures in outdoor light, keeping the draftsmanship he learned in Paris for the figures and using a more Impressionist style for the setting.

Lawton S. Parker was an artist and teacher who traveled frequently between the United States and Europe and he settled in Giverny in 1903. Even though Parker shared a Giverny garden with Frieseke, he is not credited with painting figures in garden settings extensively until about 1909. Then, he painted the same sorts of subjects as his Giverny companions. Edmund Greacen was a New Yorker and he arrived in Giverny in 1907 where he painted a series of garden and domestic subjects in a painterly manner, with a clear French influence. The Chicago-trained painter Karl Anderson was only in Giverny a short time, but it changed the direction of his career and he will always be identified with the French village because he adopted the same subjects and a similar way of working.

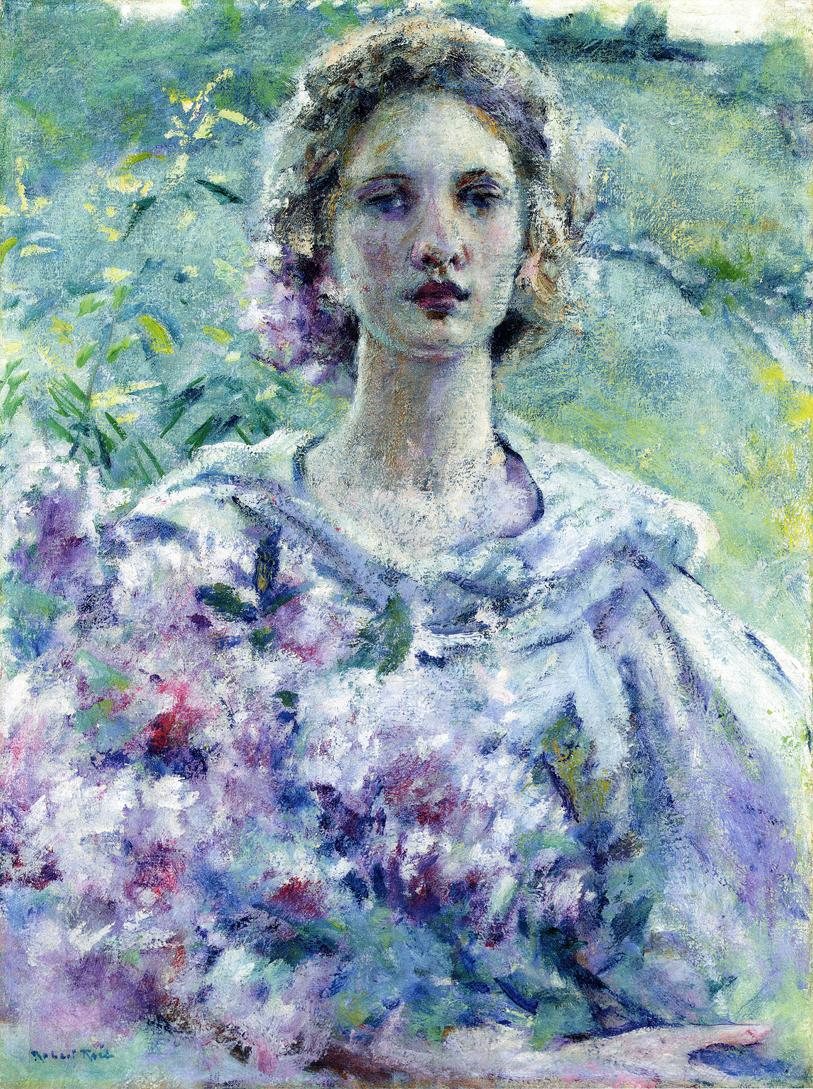
Robert Reid. Girl with Flowers.

In December 1910, six of the Giverny painters - Frieseke, Miller, Parker, Rose, Graecen and Anderson were given a show at the Madison Gallery in New York which termed them "The Giverny Group" and one of the reviews called them "Impressionists of the very best sort." The German-born Chicago painter Karl Albert Buehr came to Giverny about 1909 and spent summers there until 1912. In Giverny, he turned to painting women in outdoor light, leaving behind the darker tonalities and landscape subjects of his earlier work. Buehr too became associated with Giverny and with French Impressionism and he passed his confidence in the Impressionist palette to his many students.

A younger artist, Louis Ritman, was Russian born and Chicago-trained and he came to Giverny in 1911 and spent the next eighteen summers there, even during World War I, when most of the Americans had left for home. Ritman was highly influenced by Frieseke and he painted women in interior and outdoor settings, usually approaching the figure with some delicacy and handing the background in a manner reminiscent of French Impressionism.

Another American painter whose work clearly falls under the description of "Decorative Impressionism" is Robert Reid. Although Reid was not part of the Giverny Colony, he was Paris-trained and at the same time it was active, he was working out his own solution of how to reconcile his academic training with a decorative aspect. His solution was different from the Giverny painters. He used boldly decorative compositions, full of cool tones, that had a distinct organic influence that made them reminiscent of Art Nouveau.

== A second generation ==
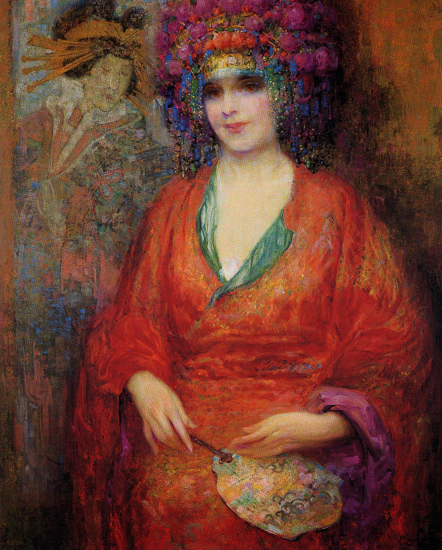
Theodore Lukits. Oriental Harmony (1918).

Because several members of the Giverny Colony were teachers and mentors to a number of other American painters, their style of painting lived on through the works of their students. Two of these artists, the Chicago trained painters Theodore Lukits and Christian von Schneidau both ended up in California, where American Impressionism remained popular for a longer time than anywhere else. Both Lukits and Von Schneidau were students of the Giverny Impressionist Karl Albert Buehr, at the School of the Art Institute of Chicago where they both excelled and won traveling scholarships. Both were also students of Richard E. Miller. Lukits studied with Miller in St. Louis, when he was a young prodigy and von Schenidau studied with him in the art colony of Provincetown, Massachusetts, where Miller lived until his death.

Lukits was already doing large, decorative works with well modeled figures and highly patterned backgrounds in Chicago in 1918 and 1919 and he continued the practice in California, with many works of Asian subjects like the silent film actor Sōjin Kamiyama and portraits like "Mrs. Ray Milland" (1942). Theodore Lukits used the term "Decorative Portraits" himself in describing such works, so the alignment with Brinton's original thesis is clear. Like Miller's work, the artist painted the figure quite realistically, but created the background with more decorative elements. Von Schneidau did several large, very decorative portraits that were exhibited widely in the 1920s and reproduced including "5'O'clock (Mrs. Elwood Riggs)" and "Mary Pickford (Reading the Sundial).

== See also ==
- Impressionism
- American Impressionism
- California Plein-Air Painting
