= Karl Albert Buehr =

German artist (1866-1952)

Karl Albert Buehr (1866–1952) was a painter born in Germany.

Buehr was born in Feuerbach – near Stuttgart. He was the son of Frederick Buehr and Henrietta Doh (Dohna?). He moved to Chicago with his parents and siblings in the 1880s. In Chicago, young Karl worked at various jobs until he was employed by a lithograph company near the Art Institute of Chicago. Introduced to art at work, Karl paid regular visits to the Art Institute, where he found part-time employment, enabling him to enroll in night classes. Later, working at the Institute as a night watchman, he had a unique opportunity to study the masters and actually posted sketchings that blended in favorably with student's work. Having studied under John H. Vanderpoel, Buehr graduated with honors, while his work aroused such admiration that he was offered a teaching post there, which he maintained for many years thereafter. He graduated from the Art Inst. of Chicago and served in the IL Cav in the Spanish–American War. Mary Hess became Karl's wife—she was a student of his and an accomplished artist in her own right. In 1922, he was elected into the National Academy of Design as an Associate member.

== Art studies in Europe ==
In 1904, Buehr received a bronze medal at the St. Louis Universal Exposition, then, in 1905, Buehr and his family moved to France, thanks to a wealthy Chicago patron, and they spent the following year in Taormina, Sicily, where the artist painted local subjects, executing both genre subjects and landscapes as well as time in Venice. Buehr spent at least some time in Paris, where he worked with Raphaël Collin at the Académie Julian.

== Giverny and American Impressionism ==
Prior to this time, Buehr had developed a quasi-impressionistic style, but after 1909, when he began spending summers near Monet in Giverny, his work became decidedly characteristic of that plein-air style but he began focusing on female subjects posed out-of-doors. He remained for some time in Giverny, and here he became well-acquainted with other well known expatriate American impressionists such as Richard E. Miller, Theodore Earl Butler, Frederick Frieseke, and Lawton Parker. It seems likely that Buehr met Monet, since his own daughter Kathleen and Monet's granddaughter, Lili Butler, were playmates, according to George Buehr, the painter's son. His other daughter Lydia died before adulthood due to diabetes. He returned to Chicago at the onset of World War I and taught at The Art Inst for many years. One of his noted pupils at the Art Institute was Archibald Motley, Jr. the famous African American Harlem Renaissance painter. Motley credits Buehr with being one of his finest teachers and one who encouraged his style.

== Teaching career in Chicago ==
Buehr remained an expressive colorist, but broadened his brushwork somewhat in later years when impressionism waned. Back in America, he was immediately successful. He won a silver medal at the Panama-Pacific International Exposition in San Francisco and the Purchase Prize of the Chicago Municipal Art Commission in the following year. Buehr had a one-man exhibition at the Century of Progress Fair in Chicago in 1934.

Karl Buehr died in Chicago at the age of 86.

His nephew Walter Buehr (1897–1971) was the author and illustrator of many children's books.
