= Christian von Schneidau =

American painter

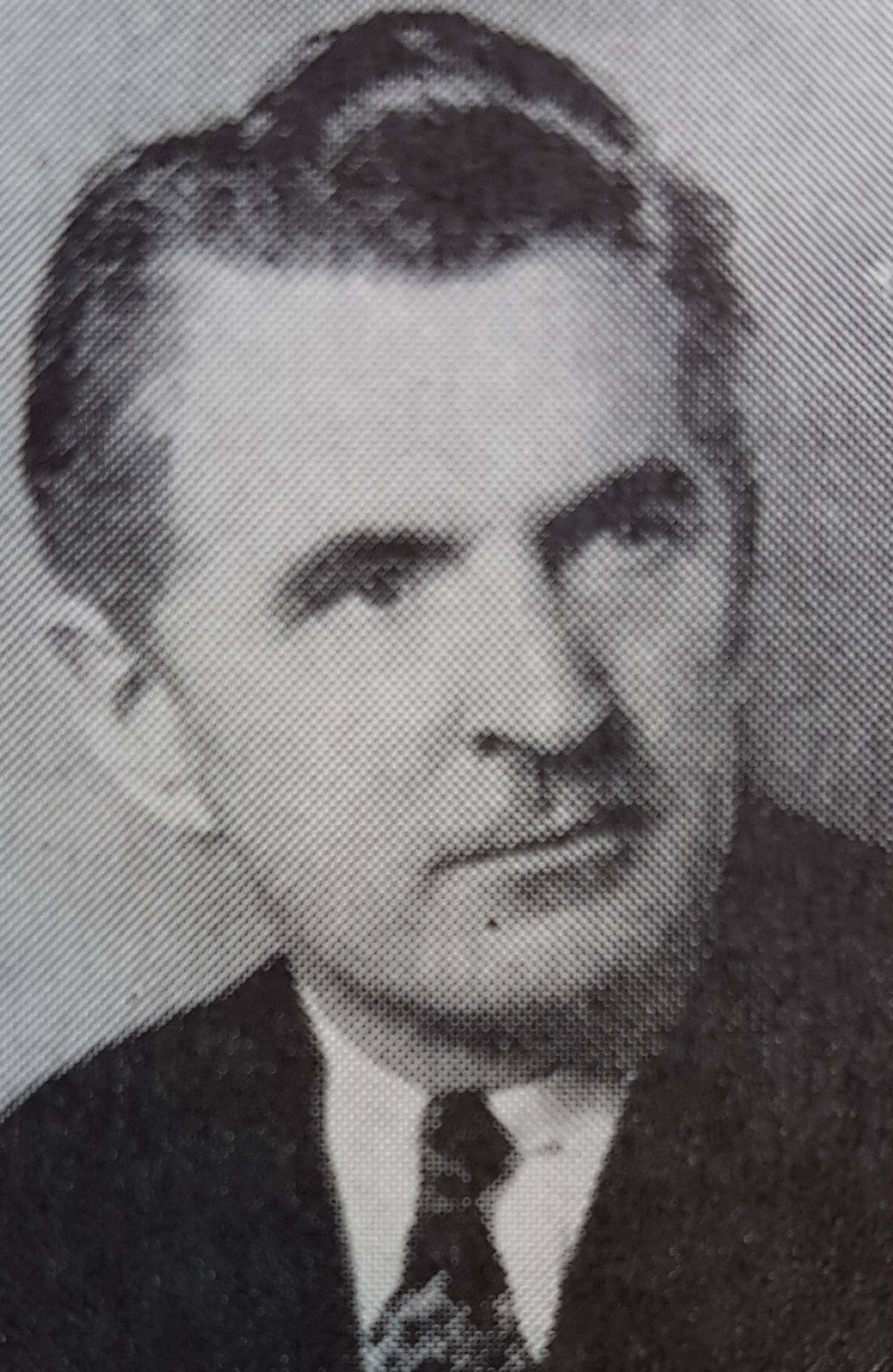
- von Schneidau, c. 1920
- Born: Bror Christian Valdemar Von Schneidau; March 24, 1893; Ljungby, Sweden
- Died: January 6, 1976 (aged 82); Orange, California, US
- Known for: Landscape Painting, Portraiture, Mural Painting
- Movement: California Plein-Air Painting, American Impressionism

Bror Christian Valdemar Von Schneidau (March 24, 1893 – January 6, 1976) was a Swedish-born American painter. Active during the Roaring Twenties, he painted film industry figures in the American Impressionist style. Von Schneideau was born in Kalmar County, Sweden 1893, with the name Bror Christian Valdemar Von Schneidau, but went by the shortened Christian von Schneidau. In addition to his portraiture, von Schneidau was also a landscape painter and a private teacher who passed on the French principles of instruction, which he learned at the Art Institute of Chicago to his students. Von Schneidau was also the founder of the Scandinavian-American Art Society in 1938 and served as its president for many years. He was also an active member of the California Art Club.

== Childhood and education in Chicago ==
Christian von Schneidau was born on March 24, 1893, in Ljungby, to Waldemar and Sophie von Schneidau. His father's family was a noble one and many of his ancestors had served in the Swedish government. His father was a horse breeder and therefore von Schneidau grew up on a large estate. As with most painters, he showed his artistic talents at an early age and received encouragement and private lessons. The von Schneidau family emigrated to America, and like many Scandinavians, they settled in Minnesota. He won a scholarship to study at the Art Institute of Chicago, which was the largest art school in the United States. He received a formal, French Beaux-Arts style education at the Art Institute. While there, he shared a studio with a younger artist, Theodore Lukits, whom he would be linked to and remain friends with for the rest of his life. The pair shared an interest in figurative painting while many of their contemporaries were landscape painters. They would both paint film stars as well as painting figures in natural light, and they both studied with Richard E. Miller and Charles Hawthorne. He won the John Quincy Adams Traveling Scholarship at the Art Institute in 1916, but because Europe was at war, he used the funds to finance his art studies in the east and to travel west to California.

== Von Schneidau in California ==
Von Schneidau moved to California in 1917 and immediately became part of the artistic life of his chosen home. He exhibited his painting of Joan de Arc at the California Art Club's annual exhibit in 1918 and a portrait of the gallery owner Joseph Kanst the following year. Once in California, he was influenced by the high-key work of the California Plein-Air Painting movement. He then met the American Impressionist Richard E. Miller who had been a member of the Giverny School and began to paint vigorously brushed landscapes as well as figurative works. Von Schneidau decided he needed further study, especially in painting figures out of doors, so he spent six months of 1920 studying with Charles Hawthorne (1872–1930) and Richard E. Miller (1875–1943) in the art colony of Provincetown, Massachusetts. When he returned from Massachusetts, he worked up a large number of paintings from his sketches, and in February 1921, had a solo exhibit at Kanst Gallery in Los Angeles, titled 'Portraits, Figures, and Landscapes by C. von Schenidau.' Some of these new works- high key portraits with a decorative appearance- are strongly reminiscent of the works of Decorative Impressionism, which his teachers Miller and Buehr began to experiment with in Giverny, France.

== See also ==
- Art Institute of Chicago
- California Art Club
- California Impressionism
- Decorative Impressionism
- Theodore Lukits

== Book and catalog references ==
- Morseburg, Jeffrey, Christian von Schneidau: 1893-1976, Unpublished Essay, 2010
- Ask Art Online Database, The Artists Bluebook,Dunbier, Lonnie Pearson, 2005
- Davenport, Ray, Davenport's Art Reference, 2005
- Pyle, Amy, Spanierman Gallery Catalog, 'Re-Emerging American Artists: Art for the New Collector,' 2004
- Hughes, Edan Milton, Artists in California: 1786-1940, 2002
- Falk, Peter Hastings, Who was Who in American Art, 1564-1975, 1999
- Gerdts, William; South, Will, California Impressionism, 1998
- 'Southwest Art,' The Red Book, 1993
- Falk, Peter Hastings, The Annual Exhibition Record of the Art Institute of Chicago, 1990
- Hughes, Edan Milton, Artists in California, 1786–1940, 1989
- Stern, Jean; Fleischer, Morton; Dominik, Janet, Masterworks of California Impressionism, 1986
- Dominik, Janet, Christian Von Schneidau, Petersen Publishing Company, 1986
- Opitz, Glenn, 'American Painters, Sculptors & Engravers,' Mantle Fielding's Dictionary, 1986
- Falk, Peter Hastings, Who was Who in American Art: Artists Active Between 1898-1947, 1985
- Dawdy, Doris, Artists of the American West: A Biographical Dictionary, 1985
- Moure, Nancy Dustin Wall, Southern California Art, 1984
- Westphal, Ruth Lilly, Plein Air Painters of California: The Southland, 1982
- Opitz, Glenn, Dictionary of American Artists, 1982
- Frey, Joseph, Art and Artists: Desert Art Center, 1965
- Mallett, Daniel Trowbridge, Index of Artists: International Biographical, 1935

== Periodical references ==
- Los Angeles Times, February 20, 1921
- Los Angeles Times, March 22, 1925
