= Louis Ritman =

American painter

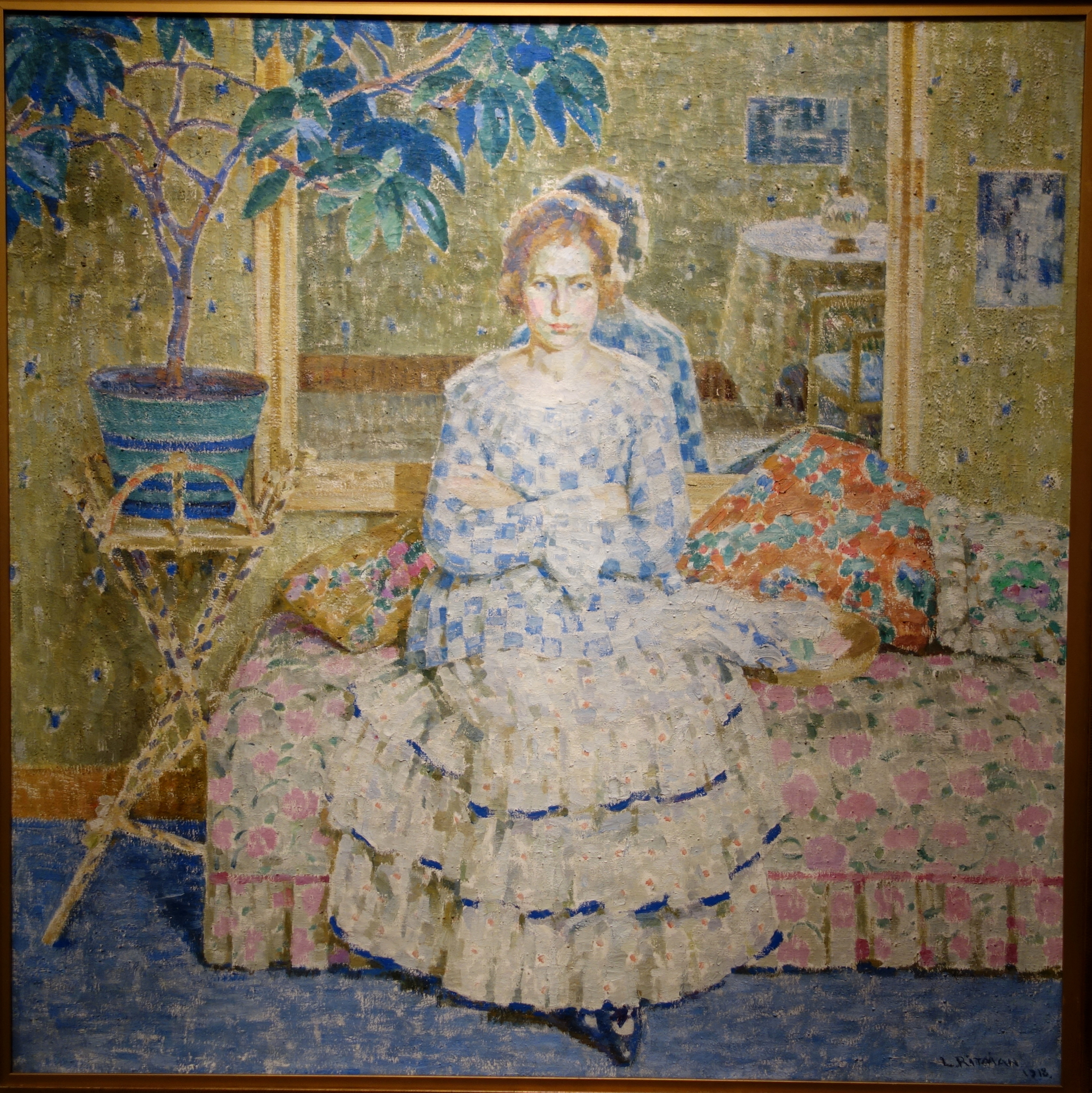
Woman before a Mirror, 1918

Louis Ritman (1889–1963) was an American impressionist painter. He is best known for his female nudes, painted in a fashion similar to that of his friends Frederick Carl Frieseke, Lawton S. Parker, and Richard E. Miller, all American artists who studied and lived in France.

Ritman was born in Kamianets-Podilskyi, Russian Empire, and moved with his family to Chicago around 1900. He took a drawing class at Hull House, then attended the Art Institute's school, the Chicago Academy of Fine Arts, and briefly the Pennsylvania Academy of the Fine Arts in Philadelphia, then in 1909 moved to the École des Beaux-Arts in Paris at the advice of Parker to continue his studies. Ritman was a member of the second generation of American artists to work in Giverny, where he first painted in 1911 and would continue to summer for the next twenty years. He and his contemporaries preferred the female nude as their subject, painted in dappled sunlight or in chromatic interiors. While his work bears strong similarities to Frieseke's, art historian William H. Gerdts notes "an appealing wistfulness which is also quite distinct." The influence of Paul Cézanne may be seen in the more structural, blocky brushstrokes of paintings after the mid- 1910s.

In 1929 Ritman returned to the United States to instruct at the School of the Art Institute of Chicago, yet continued to visit France until the end of his life. He died in Winona, Minnesota.
