= Le Mesnil-sur-Blangy =

- Commune
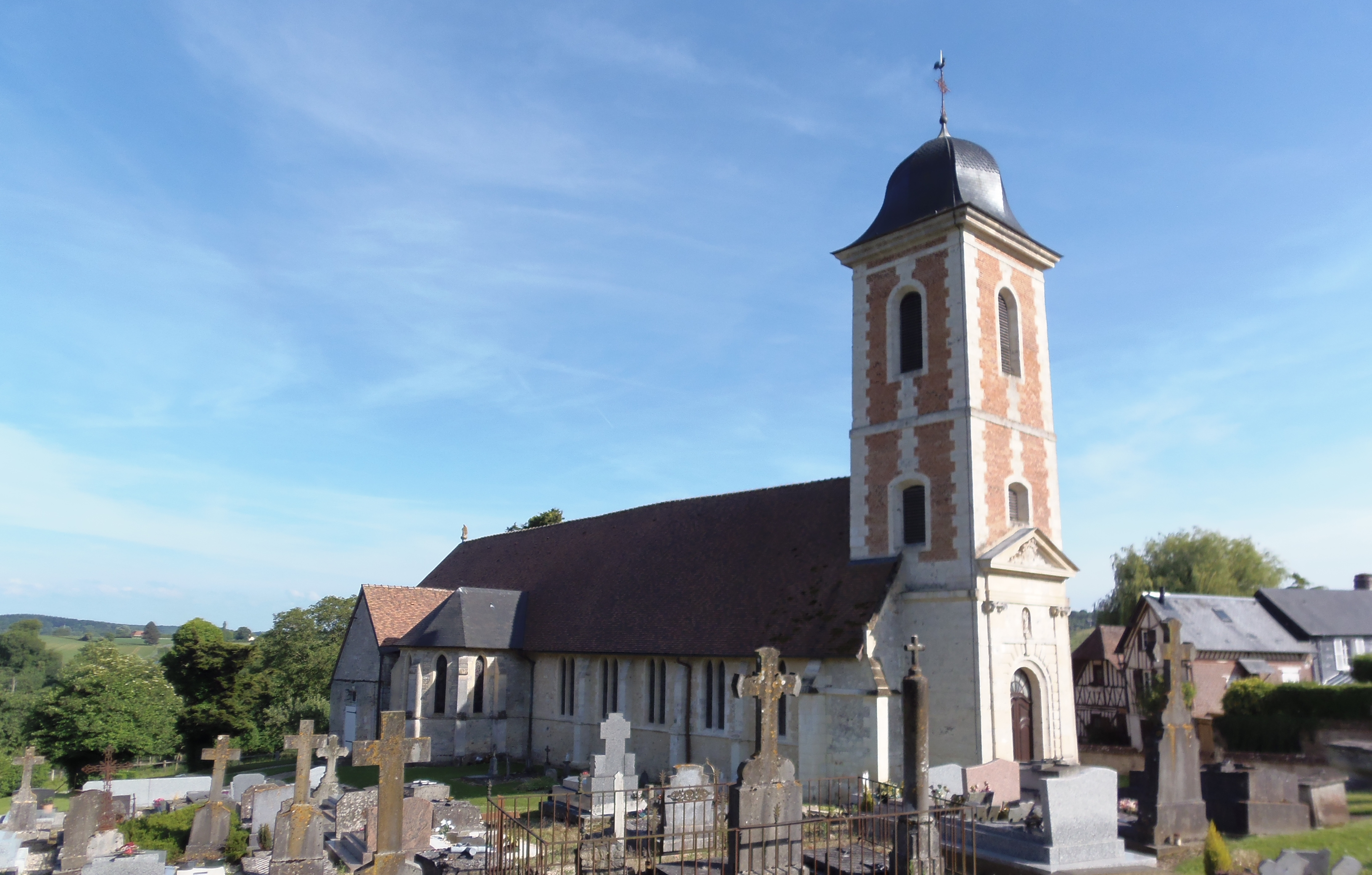
- The church in Le Mesnil-sur-Blangy
- Location of Le Mesnil-sur-Blangy
- Location within France Location within Normandy
- Coordinates: 49°15′39″N 0°15′40″E
- Country: France
- Region: Normandy
- Department: Calvados
- Arrondissement: Lisieux
- Canton: Pont-l'Évêque
- Intercommunality: CC Terre d'Auge

Government
  - Mayor (2020–2026): Benoît Legouix
- Area^{1}: 7.37 km^{2} (2.85 sq mi)
- Elevation: 192 m (630 ft)
- Highest elevation: 162 m (531 ft)
- Lowest elevation: 34 m (112 ft)
- Population (2023): 175
  - Density: 23.7/km^{2} (61.5/sq mi)
- Time zone: UTC+01:00 (CET)
  - Summer (DST): UTC+02:00 (CEST)
- INSEE/Postal code: 14426 /14130
- ^{1} French Land Register data, which excludes lakes, ponds, glaciers > 1 km^{2} (0.386 sq mi or 247 acres) and river estuaries.

Le Mesnil-sur-Blangy (French pronunciation: [lə menil syʁ blɑ̃ʒi], literally Le Mesnil on Blangy) is a commune in the Calvados department in the Normandy region in northwestern France.

== Population ==
Historical population
Year	Pop.	±% p.a.
1968	150	—
1975	120	−3.14%
1982	138	+2.02%
1990	149	+0.96%
1999	184	+2.37%
2007	179	−0.34%
2012	171	−0.91%
2017	166	−0.59%
2023	175	+0.88%
Source: INSEE

== See also ==
- Communes of the Calvados department
