= Richard E. Miller =

American painter (1875–1943)

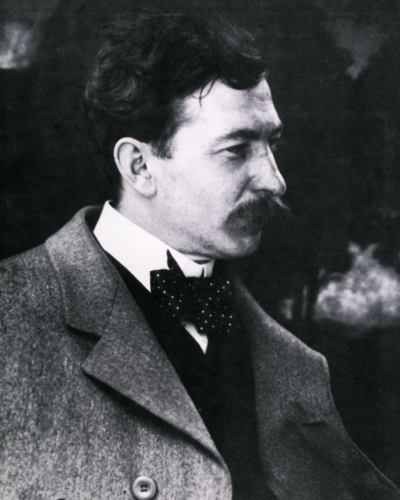
- Born: March 22, 1875; St. Louis, Missouri, U.S.
- Died: January 23, 1943 (aged 67); St. Augustine, Florida, U.S.
- Education: Studied with Edmund H. Wuerpel, Lawton Parker, Jean-Paul Laurens, Jean-Joseph Benjamin-Constant
- Known for: Painting
- Movement: American Impressionism, Decorative Impressionism
- Awards: National Academician; Bronze Medal, Pan-American Exposition, 1901; Silver Medal, St. Louis World's Fair, 1904; Silver Medal, Paris Salon, 1904; Chevalier de La Legion D'honneur

Richard E. Miller (March 22, 1875 – January 23, 1943) was an American Impressionist painter and a member of the Giverny Colony of American Impressionists. Miller was primarily a figurative painter, known for his paintings of women posing languidly in interiors or outdoor settings. Miller grew up in St. Louis, studied in Paris, and then settled in Giverny. Upon his return to America, he settled briefly in Pasadena, California and then in the art colony of Provincetown, Massachusetts, where he remained for the rest of his life. Miller was a member of the National Academy of Design in New York and an award-winning painter in his era, honored in both France and Italy, and a winner of France's Legion of Honor. Over the past several decades, he has been the subject of a retrospective exhibition and his work has been reproduced extensively in exhibition catalogs and featured in a number of books on American Impressionism.

== Youth and training ==
Richard Edward Miller was born and raised in St. Louis, Missouri, which was then one of the largest and most prosperous American cities. His father, Richard Levi Miller, was a well-respected civil engineer from Pennsylvania, who specialized in bridges and his mother was Esmerelda Story, a native of Missouri. Miller began drawing and painting as a boy and first worked as an assistant to George Eichbaum, a portrait painter. He studied art at the Washington University in St. Louis School of Fine Arts (f. 1879), first in evening classes in 1891, then as a full-time student in 1892. This was the first art school in the United States that was part of a university and it relied on the French Beaux-Arts method of curriculum. The courses he took in Drawing, Modeling, Painting, Artistic Anatomy, Perspective, and Composition would have been very similar to what a student in France would have received at that time. Miller was known for his work ethic and excelled at the School of Fine Arts, where he studied under Halsey C. Ives, the organizing director of the school, and perhaps also under Lawton S. Parker.

The Chicago World's Fair occurred while Miller studied in St. Louis and it is believed that he attended the fair and saw the thousands of contemporary works that were on exhibit, including works by the artists of the emerging American Impressionist movement and the Tonalist School. During his five years at the School of Fine Arts, Miller won many of its prizes and began to exhibit locally in 1894. Because the school was attached to the St. Louis Museum of Fine Arts and on the campus grounds of the school, students had the opportunity to see important historic works as well as exhibitions which included works from contemporary movements like Tonalism via the works of John La Farge, (1835–1910), and American Impressionism via the works of Theodore Robinson, (1892–1896), whose works were on view there during the 1895–1896 season.

At Washington University, Miller studied with Edmund H. Wuerpel, an alumnus of the school, who had recently returned from Paris, and whose own works ('spare landscapes') were highly influenced by the French Barbizon School as well as the works of Whistler. Because of his teachers' orientation and the popularity of what was called the "Tonal School" at that time, Miller's earlier works were of quiet landscapes, Tonalist in orientation. By 1897, he was working as an illustrator for the St. Louis Post Dispatch and was saving money to go to Paris to further his studies. He was subsequently honored by receiving the first scholarship to study in Paris awarded by the St. Louis School of Fine Arts Student Association.

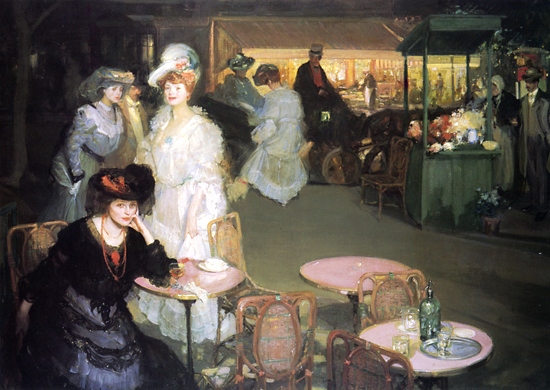
Cafe de Nuit, Richard E. Miller, Oil on Canvas, 48 1/2" × 67 3/8", collection of Terra Museum of American Art

== Paris ==
When Miller went to Paris in 1898 he was already a trained painter and was rapidly making progress at the Academie Julien, the private academy where he and many other American artists studied. He lived a modest existence with other students on the left bank. There he was acquainted with the Chicago painter, Lawton Parker, who helped him get his start in Paris. Miller's work was critiqued by Jean-Paul Laurens and Benjamin Constant, two accomplished academic painters who had an excellent reputation in the Salon. The large, ambitious works Miller produced at the turn of the century were primarily scenes of Paris cafe life. In these works of stylish Parisian women, the figures are handled in an almost academic fashion with only some areas of the background painted in an indistinct manner.

== The Giverny Colony ==
Miller seemed to turn to highly decorative works of attractive young women in their dressing gowns or kimono about 1904 and these are the works that he is best known for. He would spend summers in the American Art Colony of Giverny, which grew around Claude Monet's estate at about 1906, where he became close friends with Frederick Frieseke, another Impressionist painter. While a number of the American artists in Giverny taught, most of their instruction was informal. In contrast, Miller had an excellent reputation as a teacher and a number of his students followed him to Giverny, including John "Jack" Frost, the son of the well known illustrator A. B. Frost, who followed him to Giverny in 1909. That same summer he met a young woman painter from Maine, Harriette Adams, who would later become his wife. Miller was back in his hometown of St. Louis in the spring of 1910, but it is not known how long he remained there—probably just a few months—because he was back in Giverny that summer.

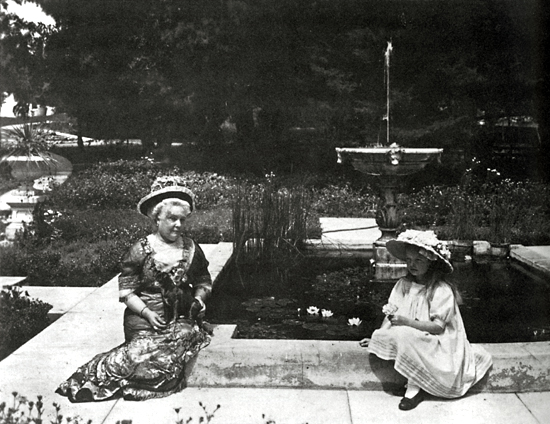
Eva Scott Fenyes with granddaughter Leonora Curtin, Pasadena, c. 1912

== Life in Pasadena ==
Miller moved back to the United States about the time World War I began. Because of his friendship with Guy Rose in Giverny, Miller moved west to the Los Angeles suburb of Pasadena to teach at the Stickney Memorial Art School. When Miller settled in Pasadena, he could not find a studio that was pleasing, with the type of filtered light he liked to use for his painting. So instead, he painted at the home of the wealthy painter and patron of the arts, Eva Scott Fenyes. A number of the paintings he is known to have painted in California are clearly sited there. There is a fountain and a pool at the Fenyes mansion that appear in several of Miller's paintings. Additionally, he painted a portrait of Mrs. Fenyes' grand daughter and a large nude which is in the collection of the Pasadena Museum of History today, located on the grounds of the Fenyes estate.

== Provincetown, Massachusetts ==
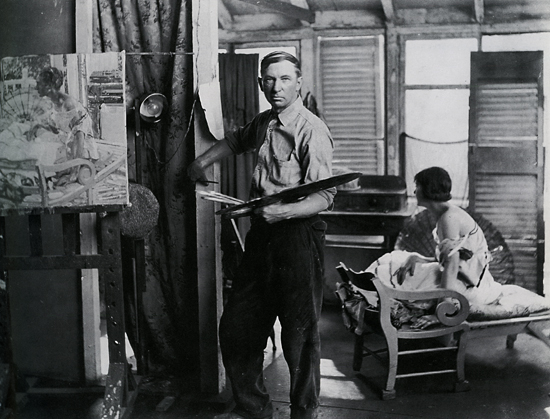
Richard E. Miller in his Provincetown studio, 1920s

Miller moved to Provincetown in 1917.

== Assessment ==
Of his classic American Impressionist paintings, production is divided between works that were done in Paris, usually in darker tonalities, the brightly colored works done in Giverny, a brief but productive period in Pasadena and then his years in Provincetown, Massachusetts.

Miller painted landscapes on occasion, but they are rare in Miller's artistic production. The women in his paintings were often depicted looking in a mirror or with a necklace in their hands, doing some sort of activity to keep them from being completely idle. The art historian William Gerdts, who has written most extensively on the American Impressionist movement, compared Miller to his friend, Frederick Frieseke: "Miller almost always stressed drawing and structure more than his colleague. The models he chose were quite distinct from Frieseke's, more poignant and lovely, less in the Renoir mode." Late in his career, his work turned darker in palette and more somber in subject and these paintings are not in the same demand as the sunnier depictions of idle women.

== Prominent students ==
- Mildred Burrage
- Catharine Carter Critcher
- John "Jack" Frost
- Theodore Lukits (1897–1992)
- Leon Makielski
- Harriette Adams Miller
- Hilda Rix Nicholas
- Pauline Palmer
- Christian von Schneidau

== See also ==
- Académie Julian
- American Impressionism
- Art colony
- California Art Club
- California Plein-Air Painting
- Decorative Impressionism
- En plein air
- French Impressionism
