= Frederick Carl Frieseke =

American painter

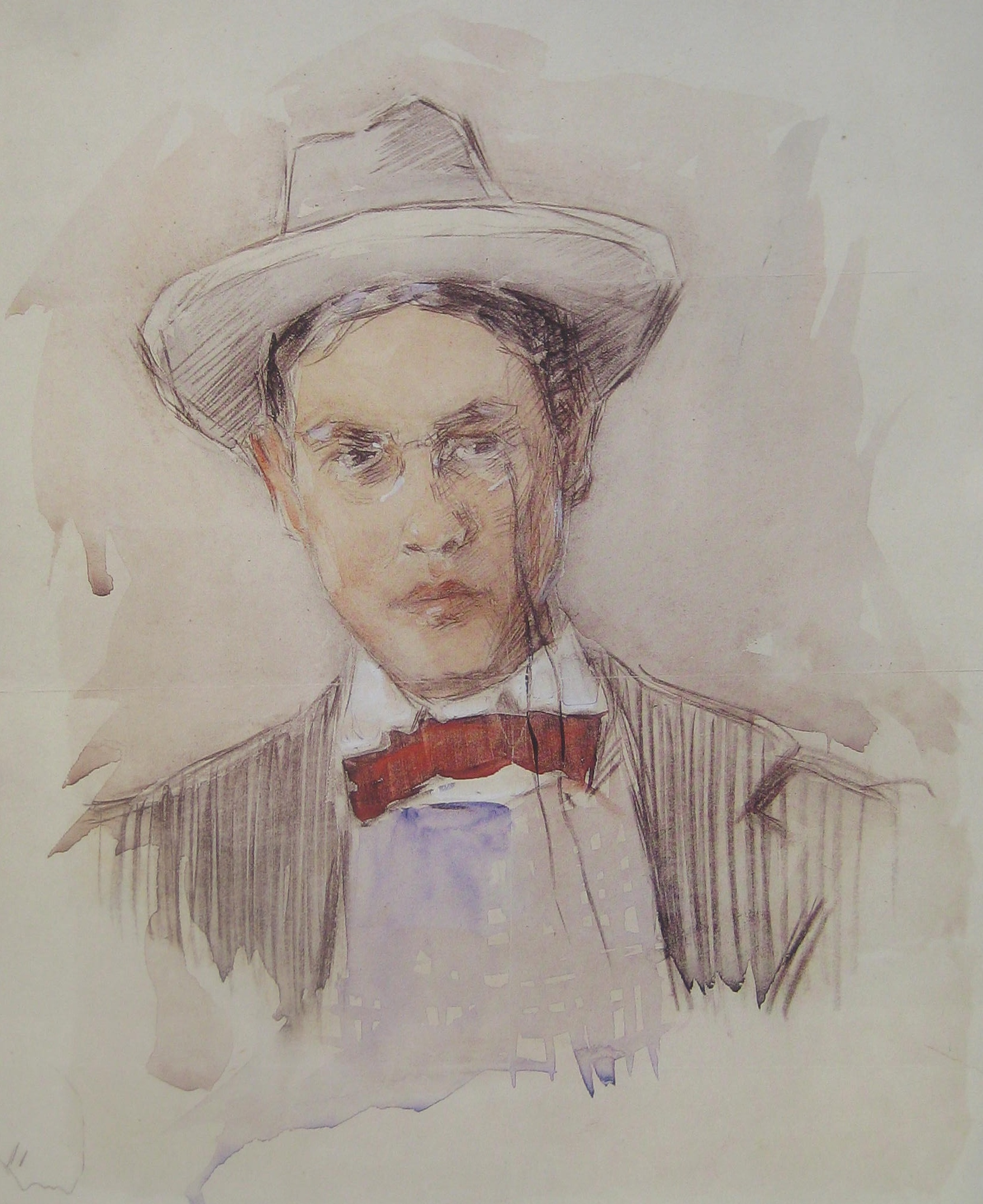
- Self-Portrait, 1901
- Born: April 7, 1874; Owosso, Michigan
- Died: August 24, 1939 (aged 65); Le Mesnil-sur-Blangy, Normandy, France
- Known for: Painting
- Movement: Impressionism/19th century Academic painting
- Awards: 1904, silver medal, Louisiana Purchase Exposition • 1904, gold medal, Munich Exposition • 1908, Clark Prize, Corcoran Gallery of Art • 1913, Temple Gold Medal, Pennsylvania Academy of the Fine Arts • 1915, Grand Prize, Panama–Pacific International Exposition • 1920, two gold medals and the popular prize, Art Institute of Chicago • 1920, Chevalier of the French Legion of Honour
- Elected: 1912, Associate, National Academy of Design • 1914, Academician, National Academy of Design

Frederick Carl Frieseke (April 7, 1874 – August 24, 1939) was an American Impressionist painter who spent most of his life as an expatriate in France. An influential member of the Giverny art colony, his paintings often concentrated on various effects of dappled sunlight.

== Background and early life ==
In 1858, Frederick Carl Frieseke's grandparents, Frederick Frieseke and his wife, emigrated from Pritzerbe (near Brandenburg, Germany) with their sons, including Herman Carl. They settled in the small central Michigan town of Owosso. Herman served in the Union Army then returned to Owosso, where he established a brick manufacturing business. He married Eva Graham and in 1871 their daughter Edith was born. Their son, Frederick Carl, was born in Owosso in 1874. Eva died in 1880 when Frederick was six years old, and in about 1881 the family moved to Florida. Herman started another brick manufacturing business in Jacksonville. The four years in Florida left an enduring impression on young Frederick; years later, when he contemplated a return to the United States from Europe, he concentrated on Florida.

Frederick's aunt recounted how, unlike most boys, he was interested in the arts more than in sports. His grandmother, Valetta Gould Graham, enjoyed painting, and encouraged Frederick in his artistic pursuits. An 1893 visit to the World's Columbian Exposition in Chicago also stimulated his desire to become an artist.

== Education ==
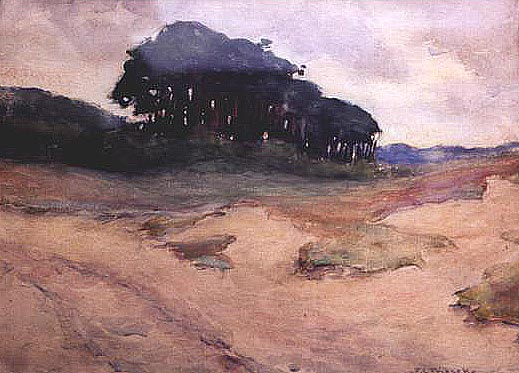
Holland 1898

In 1893, Frieseke graduated from Owosso High School, then began his artistic training at the Art Institute of Chicago, studying with Frederick Warren Freer and John Vanderpoel. After moving to New York in 1895, he resumed his art education at the Art Students League in 1897. He worked as an illustrator, selling cartoons he had drawn to The New York Times, Puck, and Truth. He claimed that he might have curtailed his art education if he had been more successful in that endeavor. The following year, he moved to France, where he would remain, except for short visits to the United States and elsewhere, as an expatriate for the rest of his life. He did continue his education, enrolling at the Académie Julian in Paris, studying under Jean-Joseph Benjamin-Constant and Jean-Paul Laurens, and receiving criticism from Auguste Joseph Delécluse. His studies also included some time at Académie Carmen under James Abbott McNeill Whistler. Frieseke visited Holland, including the Katwijk and Laren artist colonies, in the summer of 1898. During this time he sketched and painted in watercolors, and he initially planned to make that his specialty, but he was encouraged by Académie Carmen instructor Frederick William MacMonnies to work in oils.

Frieseke discounted his formal art education, referring to himself as self-taught; he felt that he had learned more from his independent study of artists' work than he had from his academic studies.

== Life and work ==
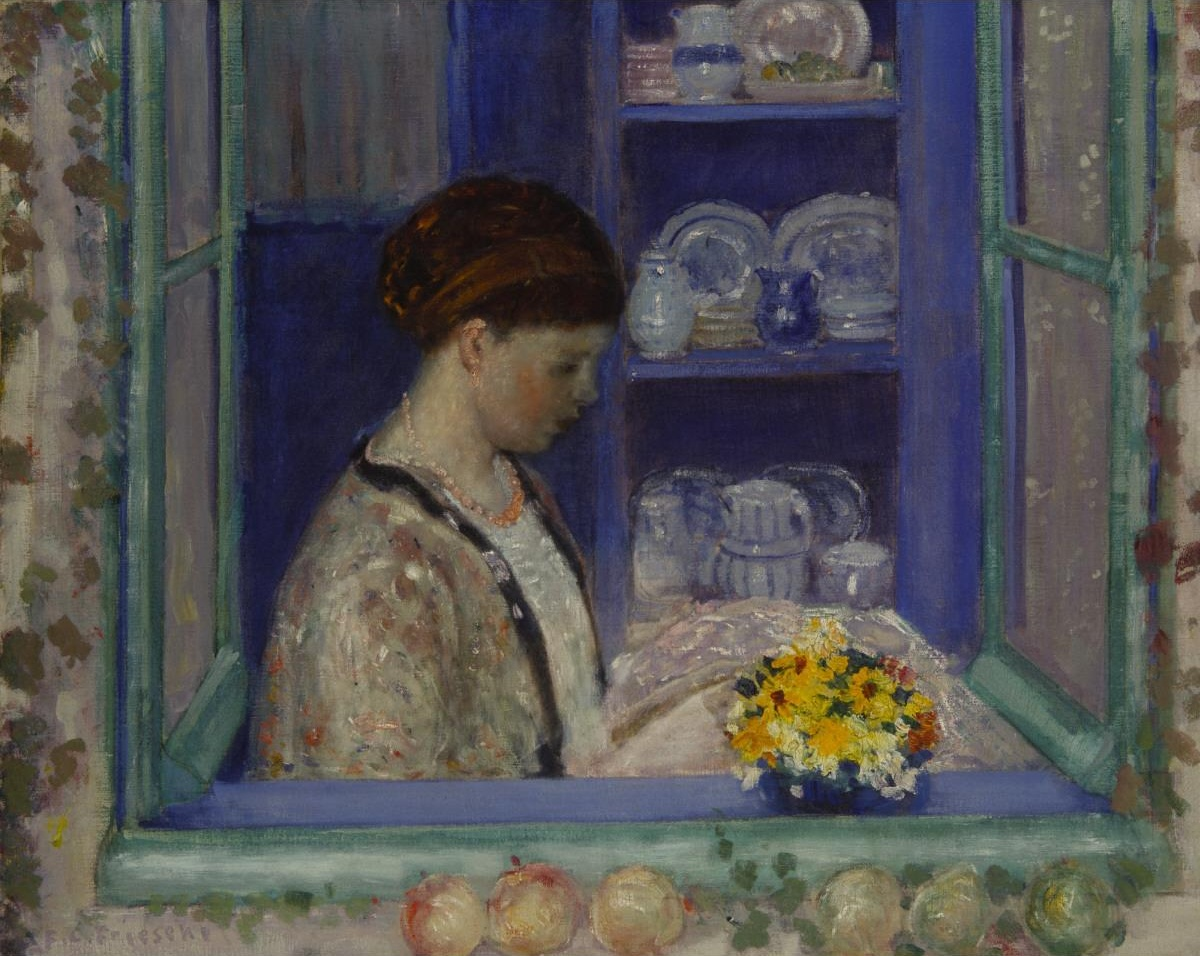
Mrs. Frieseke at the Kitchen Window, 1912

Starting in 1899, just over a year after his arrival in Paris, Frieseke exhibited at the Salon of the Société Nationale des Beaux-Arts.

Whistler's influence is evident in Frieseke's early mature paintings, with close tonalities. By his post-1900 work, his palette had evolved toward that of the Impressionists, becoming light and colorful; however, he still retained the strong linear customs of art back in the United States.

In the summer of 1905, he spent at least a month in the Giverny art colony. In October of that year he married Sarah Anne O'Bryan (known as Sadie), whom he had met seven years earlier. Frieseke and his wife (and later, their daughter) spent every summer from 1906 to 1919 in Giverny. He kept a Paris apartment and studio throughout his life, and the Friesekes spent the winters in Paris. Their Giverny house, previously the residence of Theodore Robinson, was next door to Claude Monet's. Despite the proximity, Frieseke did not become close friends with Monet, nor was Monet an artistic influence. He said in an interview, "No artist in [the impressionist] school has influenced me except, perhaps, Renoir." Indeed, Frieseke's paintings of sensually rounded figures often bear a resemblance to those of Pierre-Auguste Renoir.

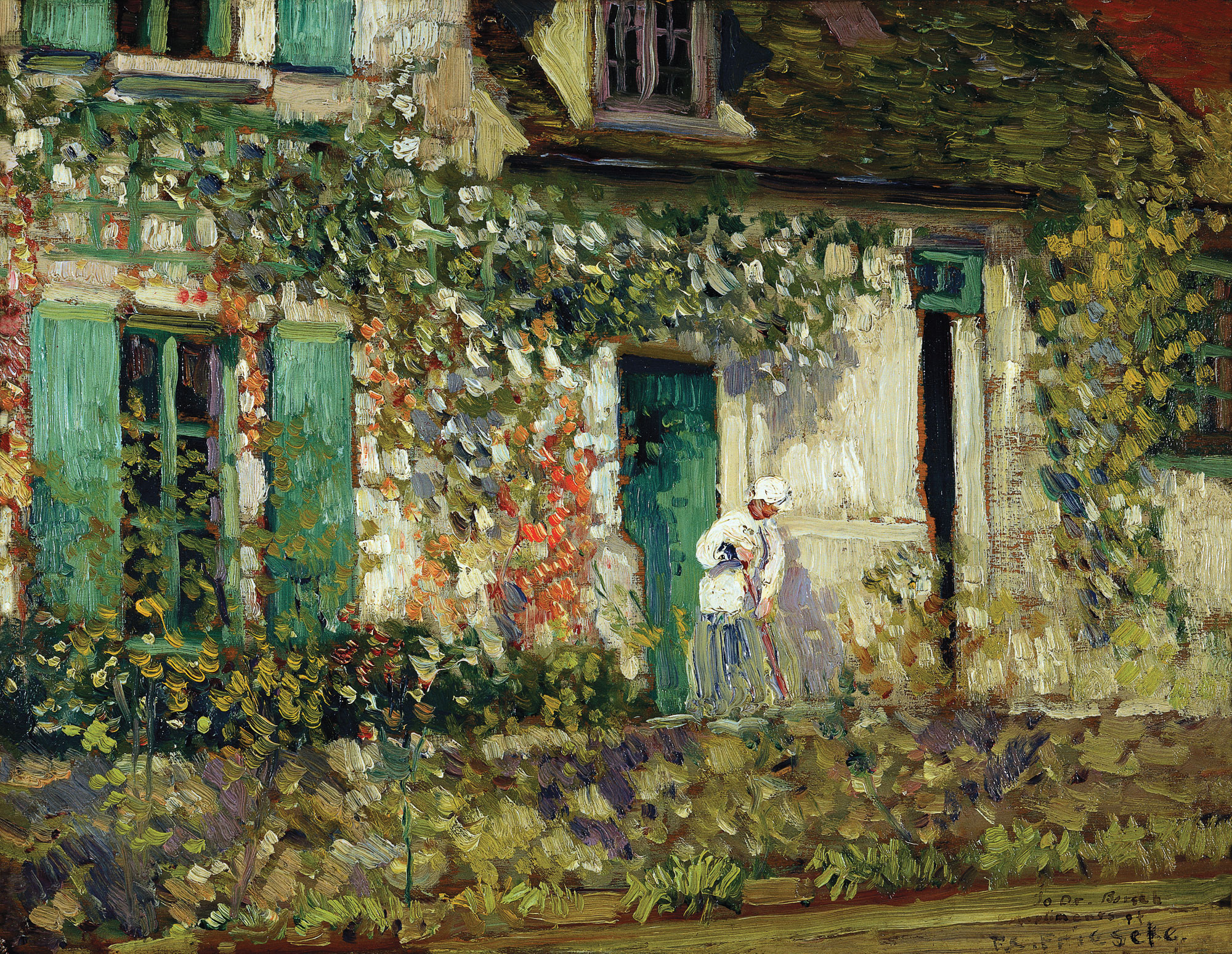
The House in Giverny, ca. 1912

The Friesekes' Giverny home and the garden they created there were often featured in his paintings, and his wife would frequently pose for him. He also kept another studio nearby on the Epte river. Many of his outdoor nudes were painted there.

After spending some time in Giverny, his unique style quickly emerged, and he would be quite influential with most of the other members of the colony. Although well known as an Impressionist, some of his work, with its "intense, almost arbitrary colors", demonstrates the Post-Impressionist influence of artists Paul Gauguin and Pierre Bonnard. The term "Decorative Impressionism" was coined by an art writer to refer to Frieseke's style. It combined the decorative style of Les Nabis, expressively using color and pattern, with classic Impressionist interests in atmosphere and sunlight.

He was very interested in rendering sunlit subjects on canvas, saying, "It is sunshine, flowers in sunshine; girls in sunshine; the nude in sunshine, which I have been principally interested in. If I could only reproduce it exactly as I see it I would be satisfied." However, his interpretation of sunshine often did not appear natural. According to a recent observer, "His light hardly seems to be plein air light at all. In fact it seems entirely artificial ... a stunning concoction of blues and magentas frosted with early summer green and flecks of white."

The prestigious Venice Biennale featured seventeen Frieseke paintings in 1909.

Frieseke's artistic influence was greatly felt among the Americans in Giverny, most of whom shared his Midwestern background and had also begun their art studies in Chicago. Among those artists were Louis Ritman, Karl Anderson, Lawton Parker, and Karl Buehr.

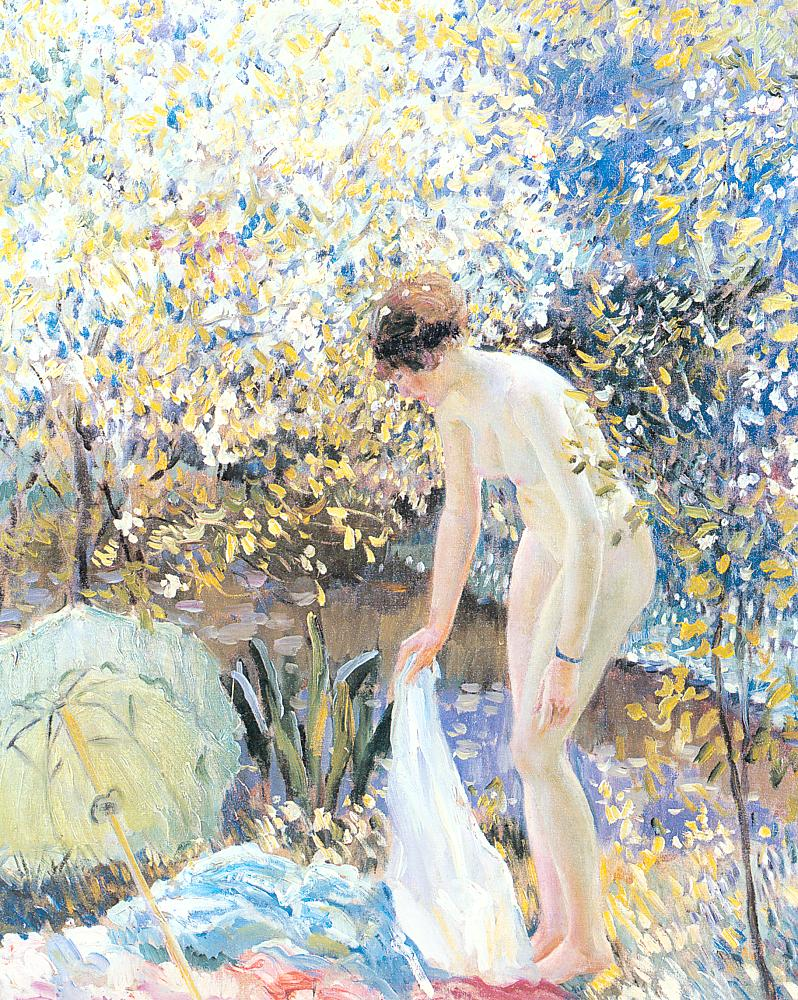
Cherry Blossoms, ca. 1913

Frieseke preferred the attitudes in France over those which he encountered in the United States: "I am more free and there are not the Puritanical restrictions which prevail in America – here I can paint the nude out of doors." He found the American attitudes to be frustrating, but occasionally a source of amusement. While on his first visit back home in Owosso in 1902, Frieseke wrote, "I get much pleasure in shocking the good Church people with the nudes".

The Friesekes' only child, daughter Frances, was born in 1914. In 1920 Frieseke and his family moved to a farm in Le Mesnil-sur-Blangy, Normandy. His art of this period concentrated on female figures, particularly nudes. While developing a more modern style, he included historical and contemporary references. He used a darker color palette and limited his use of surface patterns. In these works, his interest in chiaroscuro may be discerned.

In 1923 he left the Salon of the Société Nationale des Beaux-Arts and co-founded, with other artists, the Salon des Tuileries. He resumed painting in watercolors, especially while on trips to Nice in the winter and during a 1930 to 1932 visit to Switzerland.

Frieseke had established a superb reputation during his career. A 1931 book refers to Frieseke as "one of the most prominent members of our self-exiled Americans." He died in his Normandy home on August 24, 1939, of an aneurysm.

== Awards ==
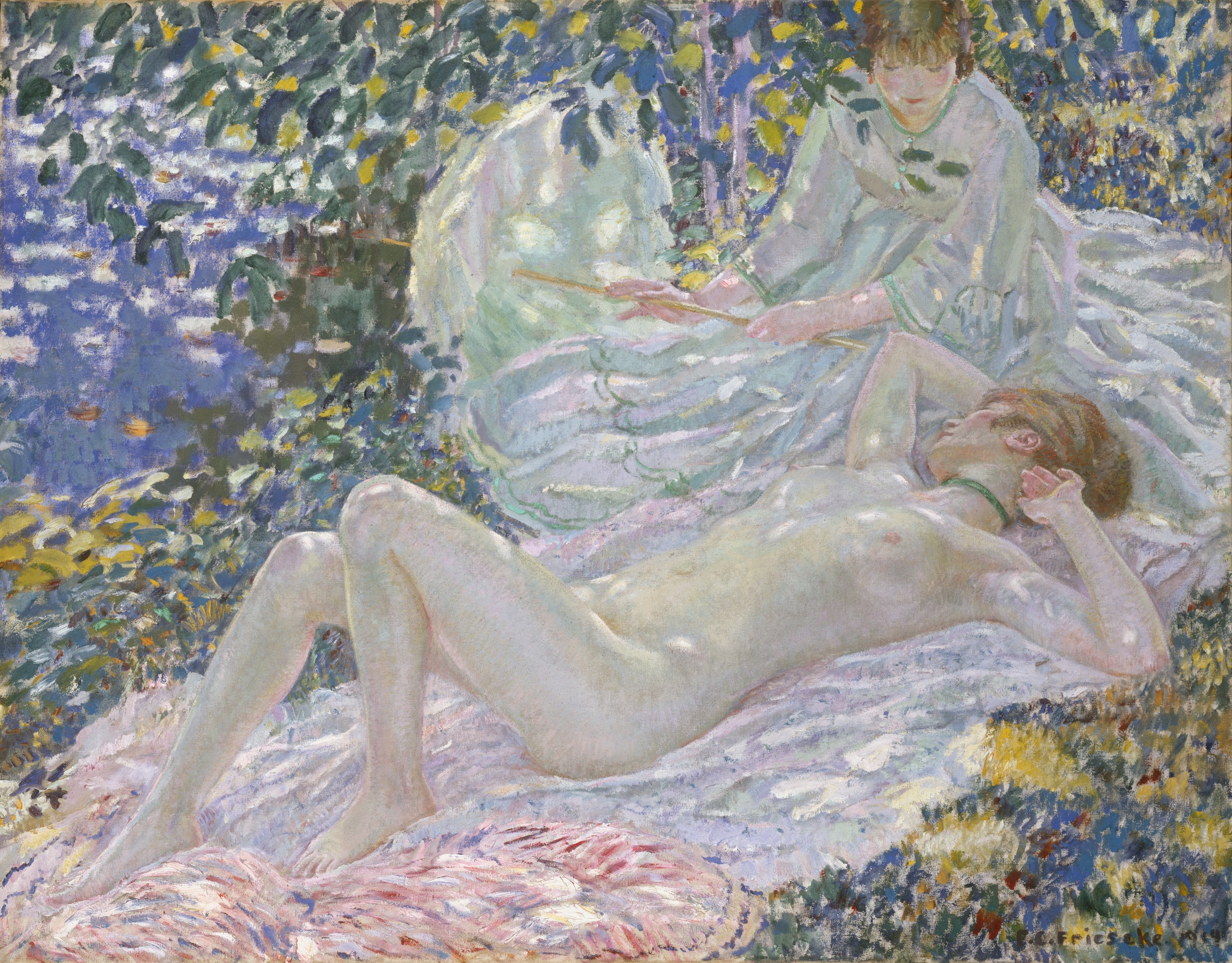
Summer, 1914

He won many awards during his career. In 1904 he received a silver medal in St. Louis at the Louisiana Purchase Exposition and was awarded a gold medal at the Munich International Art Exposition. He was honored with the William A. Clark Prize at the Corcoran Gallery of Art's 1908 biennial, and the Temple Gold Medal in the Pennsylvania Academy of the Fine Arts' annual exhibition of 1913. One of his greatest honors was winning the Grand Prize at the Panama–Pacific International Exposition, which was held in San Francisco in 1915. Among his entries was Summer, now at the Metropolitan Museum of Art. The New York Times proclaimed in June 1915: "Mr. Frieseke, whose accomplished work is well known to New Yorkers, says the last word in the style that was modern before the Modernists came along. Whatever he does has a sense of design, color, and style. A sense of gayety, an entertaining and well considered pattern, a remarkable knowledge of the effect of outdoor light on color are found in nearly all of his most recent paintings."

He received two gold medals from the Art Institute of Chicago in 1920 and he also won the popular prize, decided by artists as well as the viewing public.

Frieseke was elected an Associate of the National Academy of Design (ANA) in 1912, and an Academician (NA) in 1914. He was decorated as a Chevalier of the French Legion of Honour in 1920, a rare recognition for an American painter.

== Collections ==
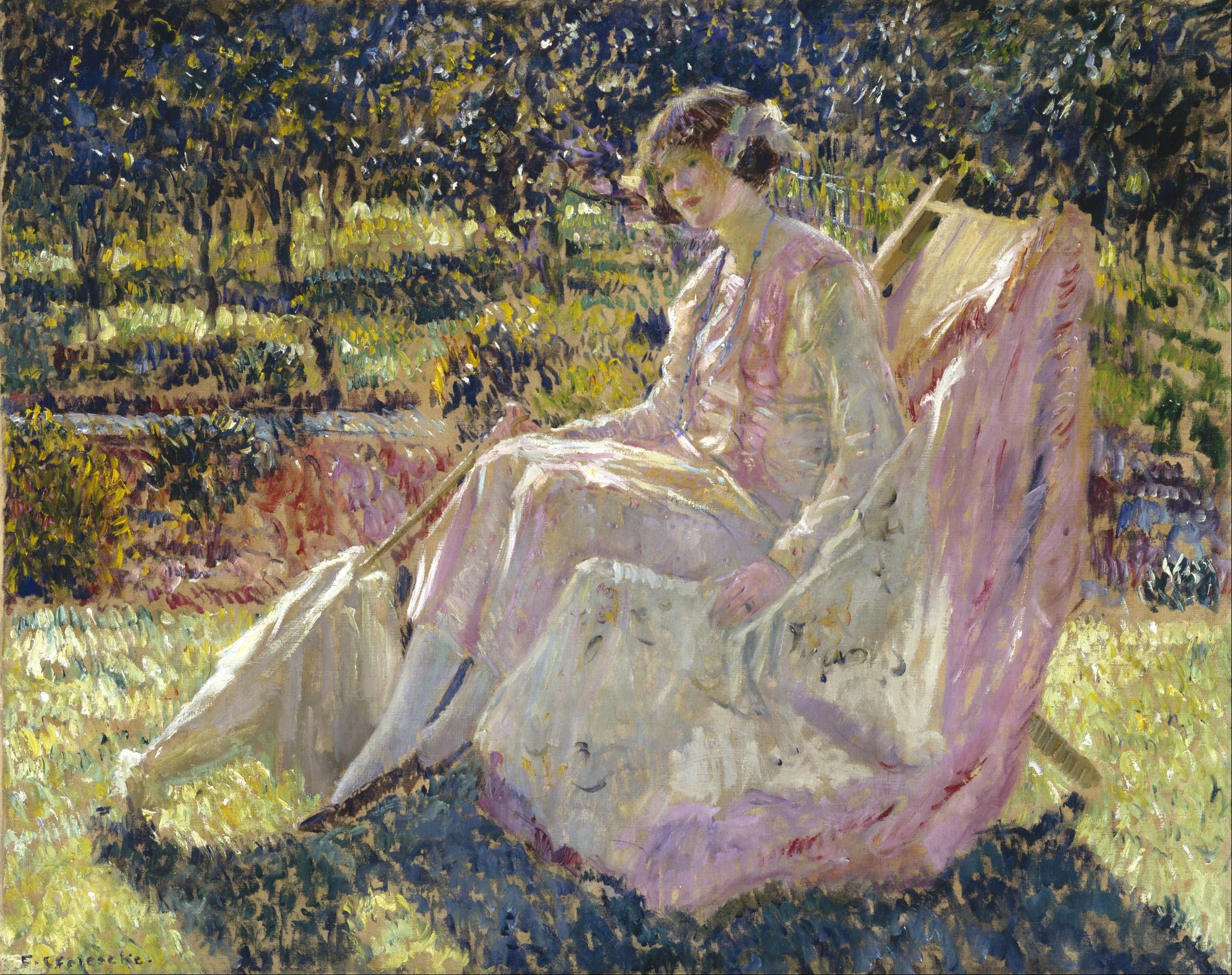
Sunbath 1908/1918

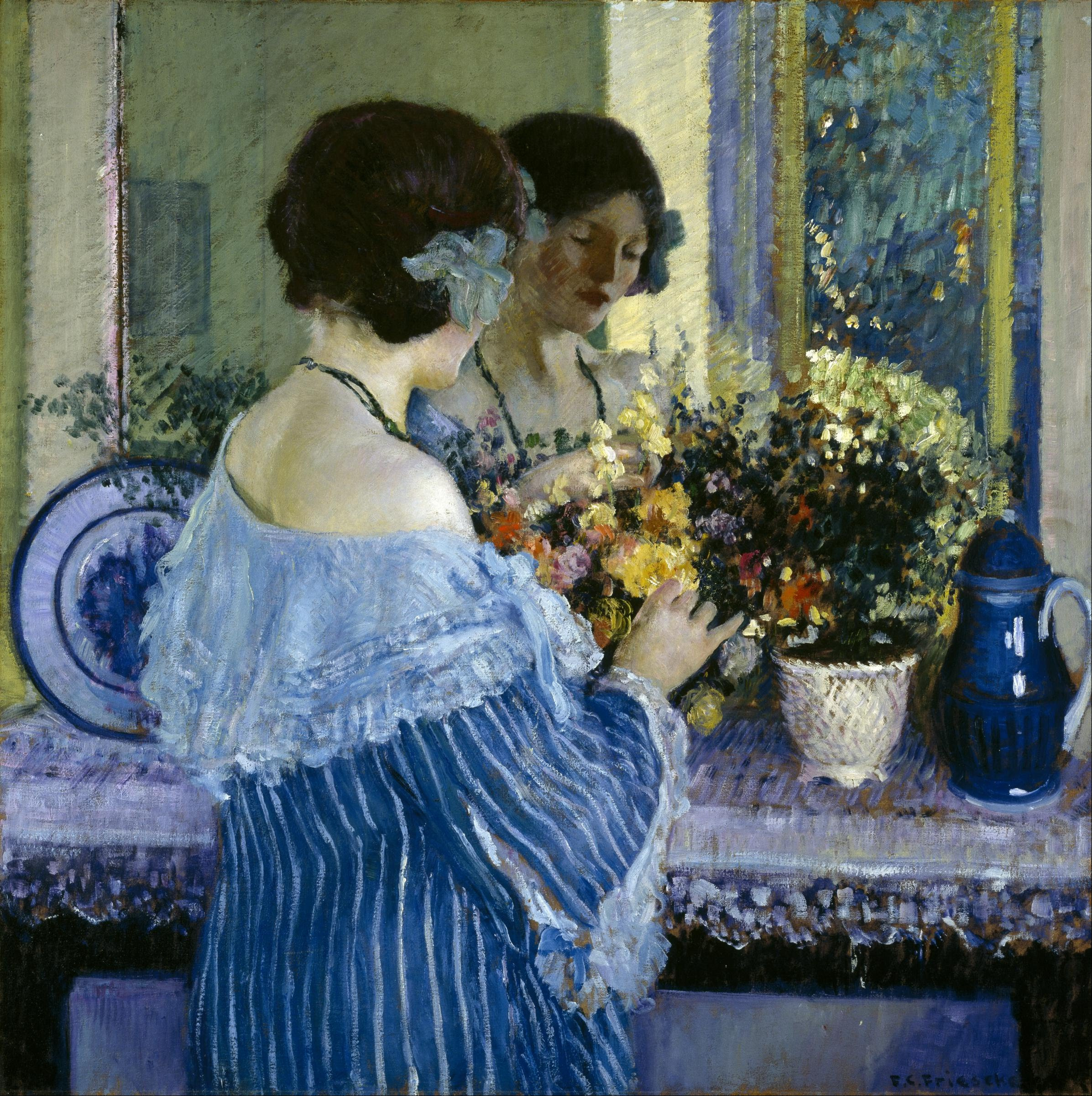
Girl in Blue Arranging Flowers

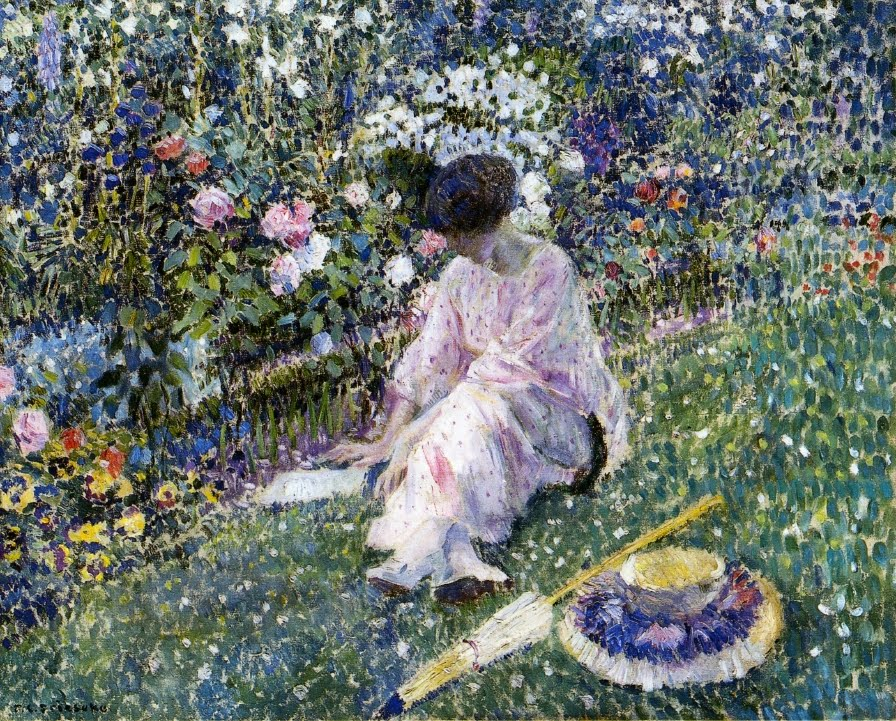
1911 garden in June

Frieseke's work is in many major collections including:

- Addison Gallery of American Art, Andover, Massachusetts
- Akron Art Museum, Akron, Ohio
- Art Institute of Chicago
- Brigham Young University Museum of Art, Provo, Utah
- Brooklyn Museum, New York City
- Butler Institute of American Art, Ohio
- Chrysler Museum of Art, Norfolk, Virginia
- Corcoran Gallery of Art, Washington D.C.
- Crocker Art Museum, Sacramento, California
- Cummer Museum of Art and Gardens, Jacksonville, Florida
- Detroit Institute of Arts
- Georgia Museum of Art, Athens, Georgia
- Grand Rapids Art Museum
- Hirshhorn Museum and Sculpture Garden, Washington D.C.
- Huntington Library, San Marino, California
- Indianapolis Museum of Art
- Los Angeles County Museum of Art
- Maier Museum of Art at Randolph College, Lynchburg, Virginia
- Metropolitan Museum of Art, New York City
- Minneapolis Institute of Arts
- Musée franco-américain du château de Blérancourt
- Musée Léon Dierx, Saint-Denis, Réunion
- Museo d'Art Moderna de Ca' Pesaro, Venice
- Museum of Fine Arts, Boston
- Museum of Fine Arts, Houston
- Museum of the National Academy of Design, New York City
- Musée des Impressionnismes (formerly the Musée d'Art Américain), Giverny
- National Gallery of Art, Washington D.C.
- National Museums Liverpool
- New Britain Museum of American Art, Connecticut
- North Carolina Museum of Art, Raleigh
- Parthenon Museum, Nashville, Tennessee
- Pennsylvania Academy of the Fine Arts, Philadelphia
- Philadelphia Museum of Art
- Saint Louis Art Museum, Saint Louis, Missouri
- Shiawassee Arts Center, Owosso, Michigan
- Smithsonian American Art Museum, Washington D.C.
- Telfair Museum of Art, Savannah, Georgia
- Terra Foundation for American Art, Chicago
- Thyssen-Bornemisza Museum, Madrid
- Virginia Museum of Fine Arts, Richmond
- University of Michigan Museum of Art, Ann Arbor, Michigan
- Wichita Art Museum

== Gallery ==
Paintings by Frederick Carl Frieseke

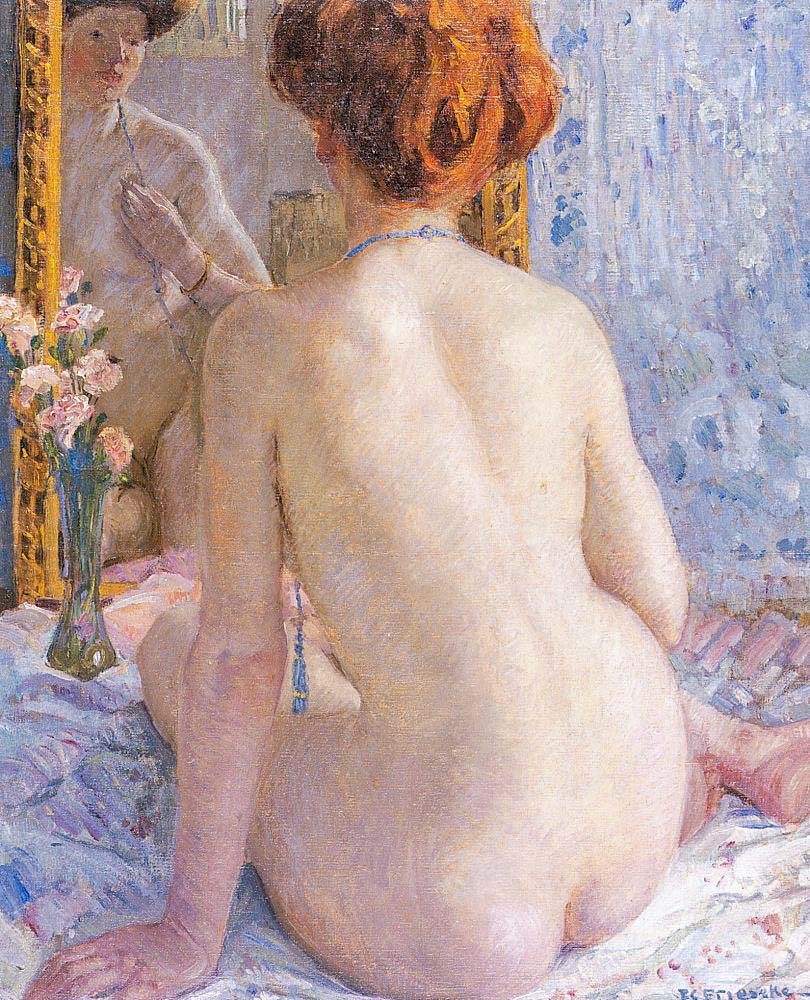
Reflections (Marcelle), by 1909

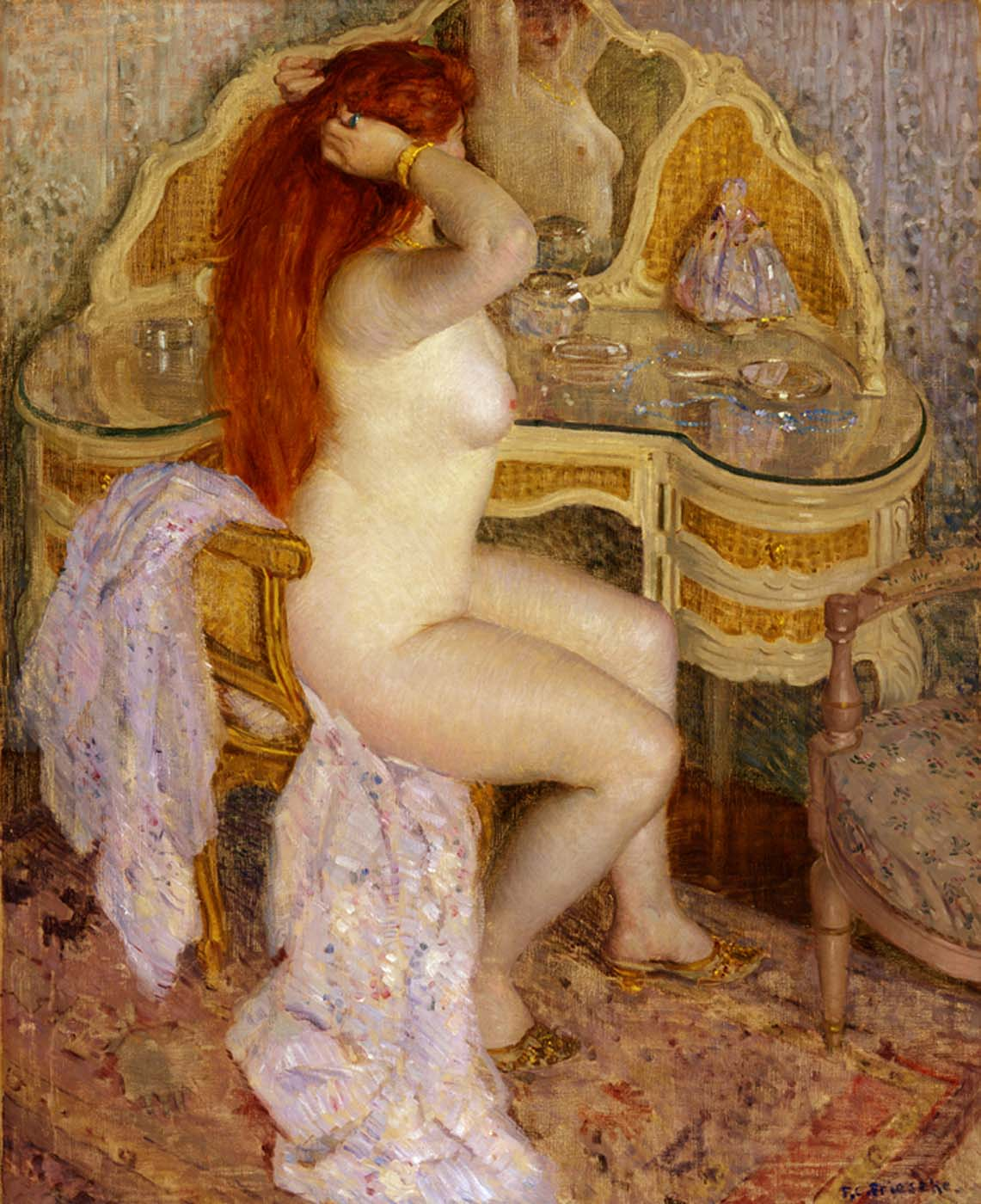
Nude Seated at Her Dressing Table, 1909

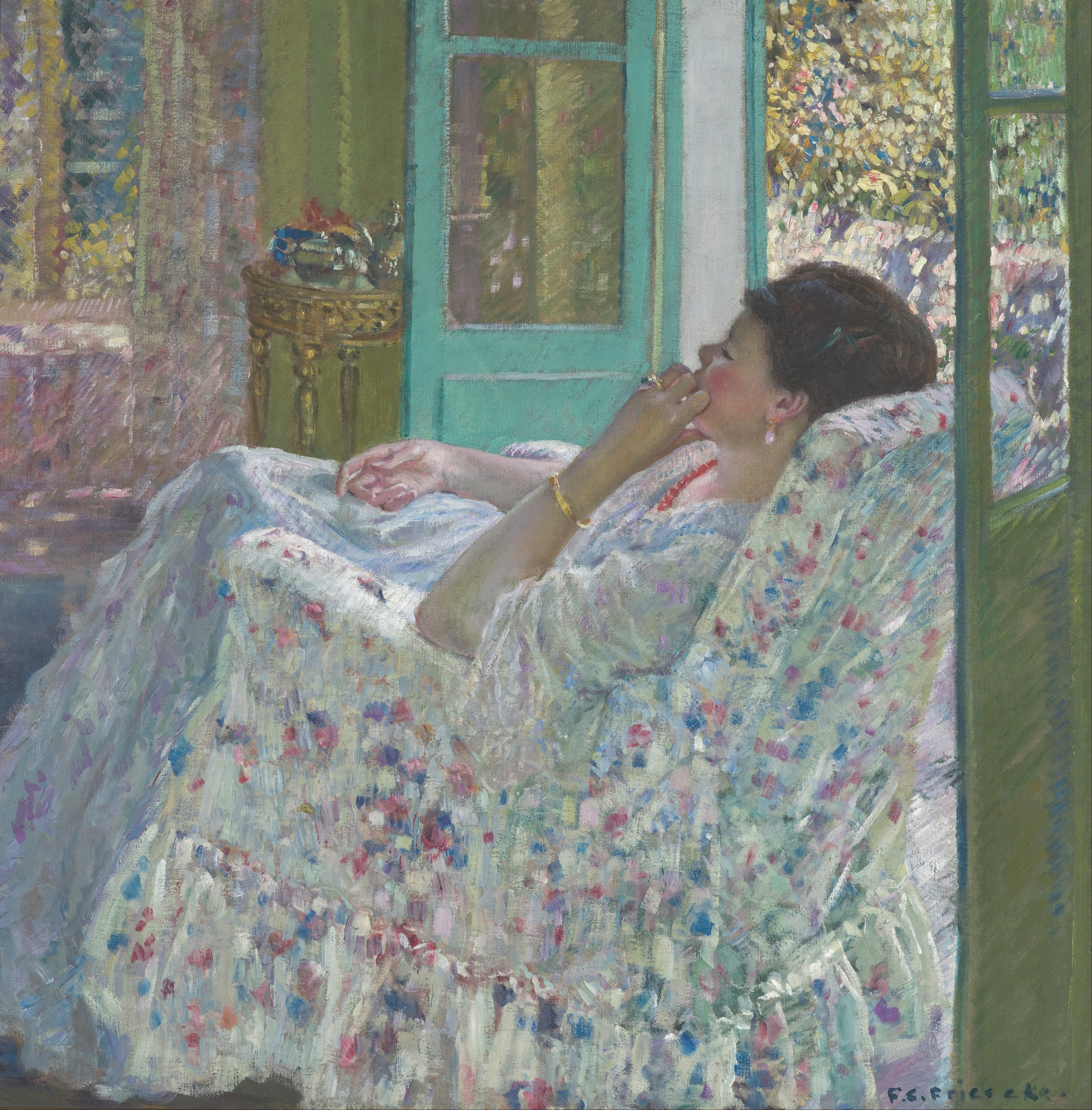
Afternoon – Yellow Room, 1910

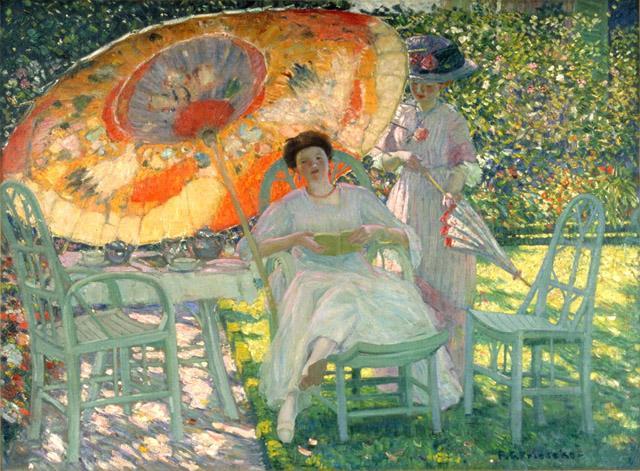
The Garden Parasol, ca. 1910

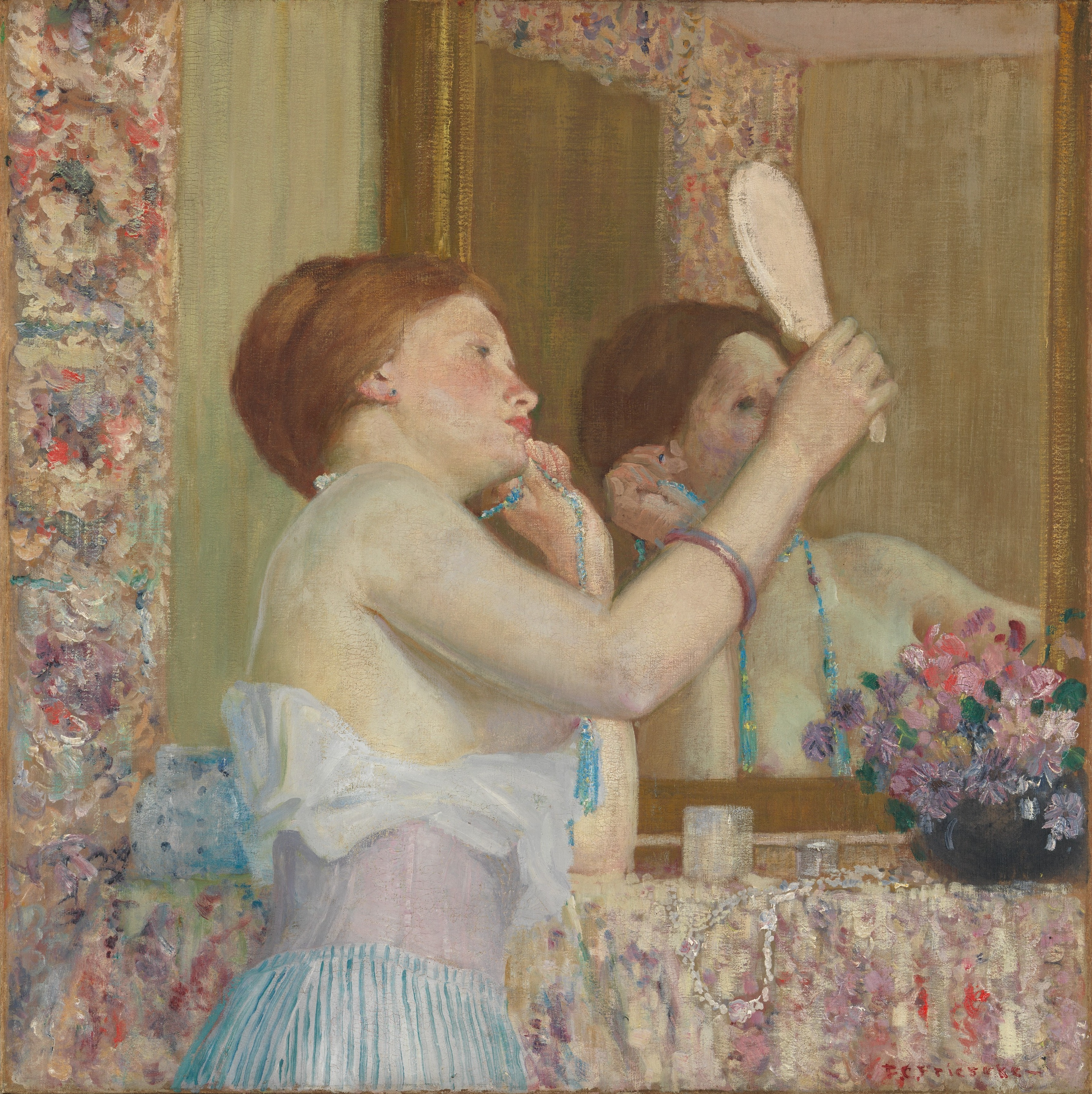
Woman with a Mirror, 1911

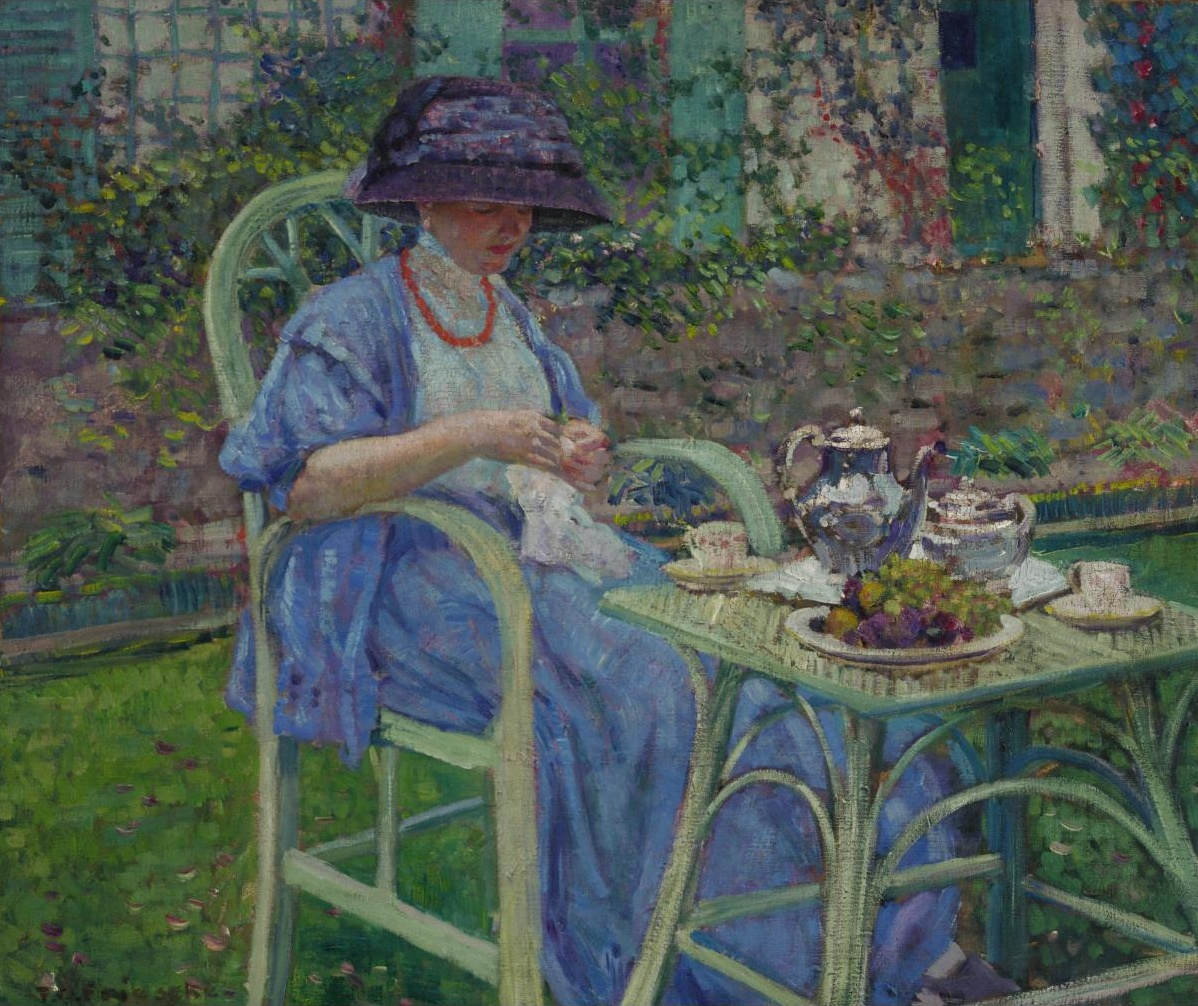
Breakfast in the Garden, ca. 1911

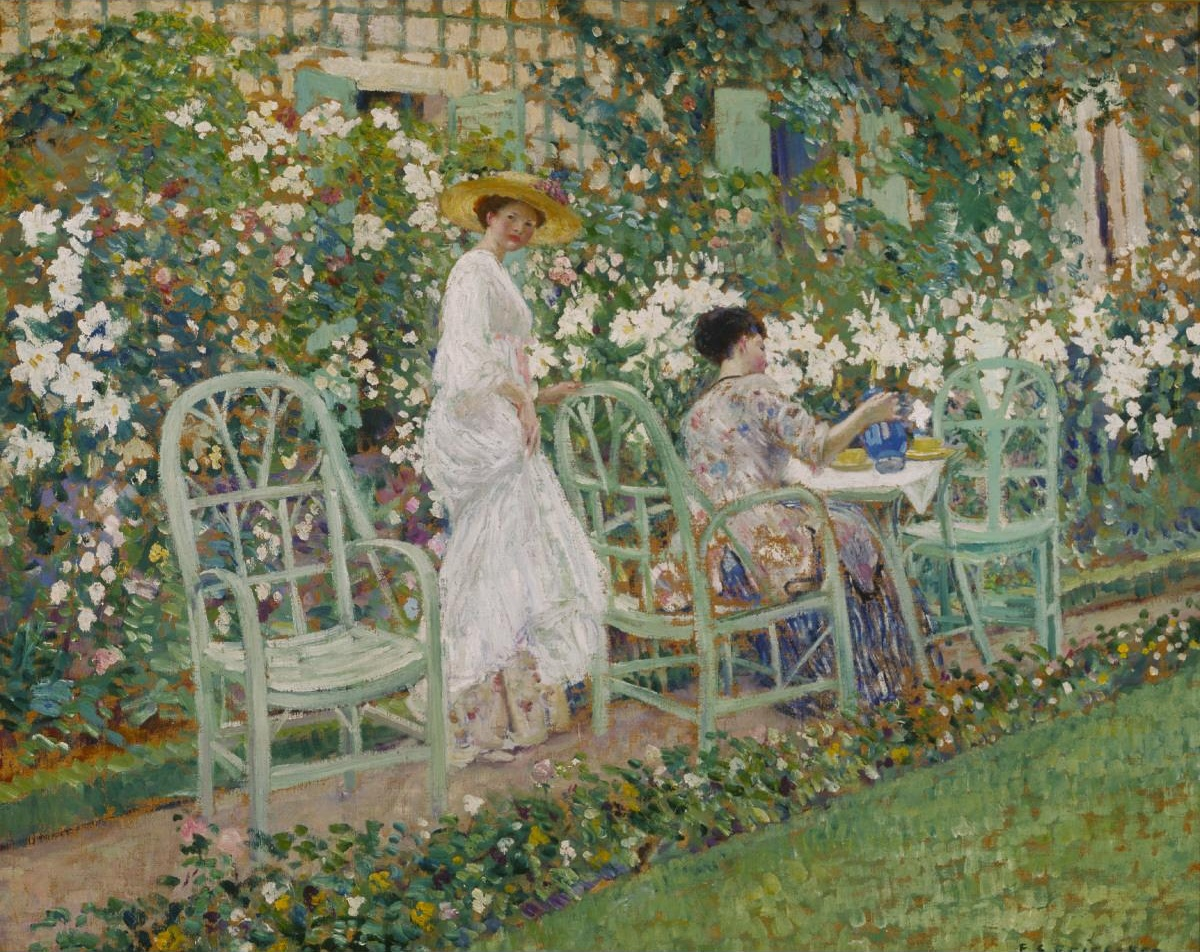
Lilies, by 1911

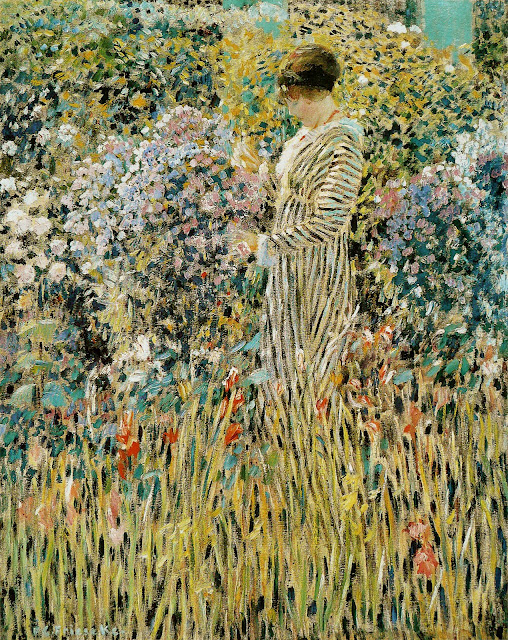
Lady in a Garden, by 1912

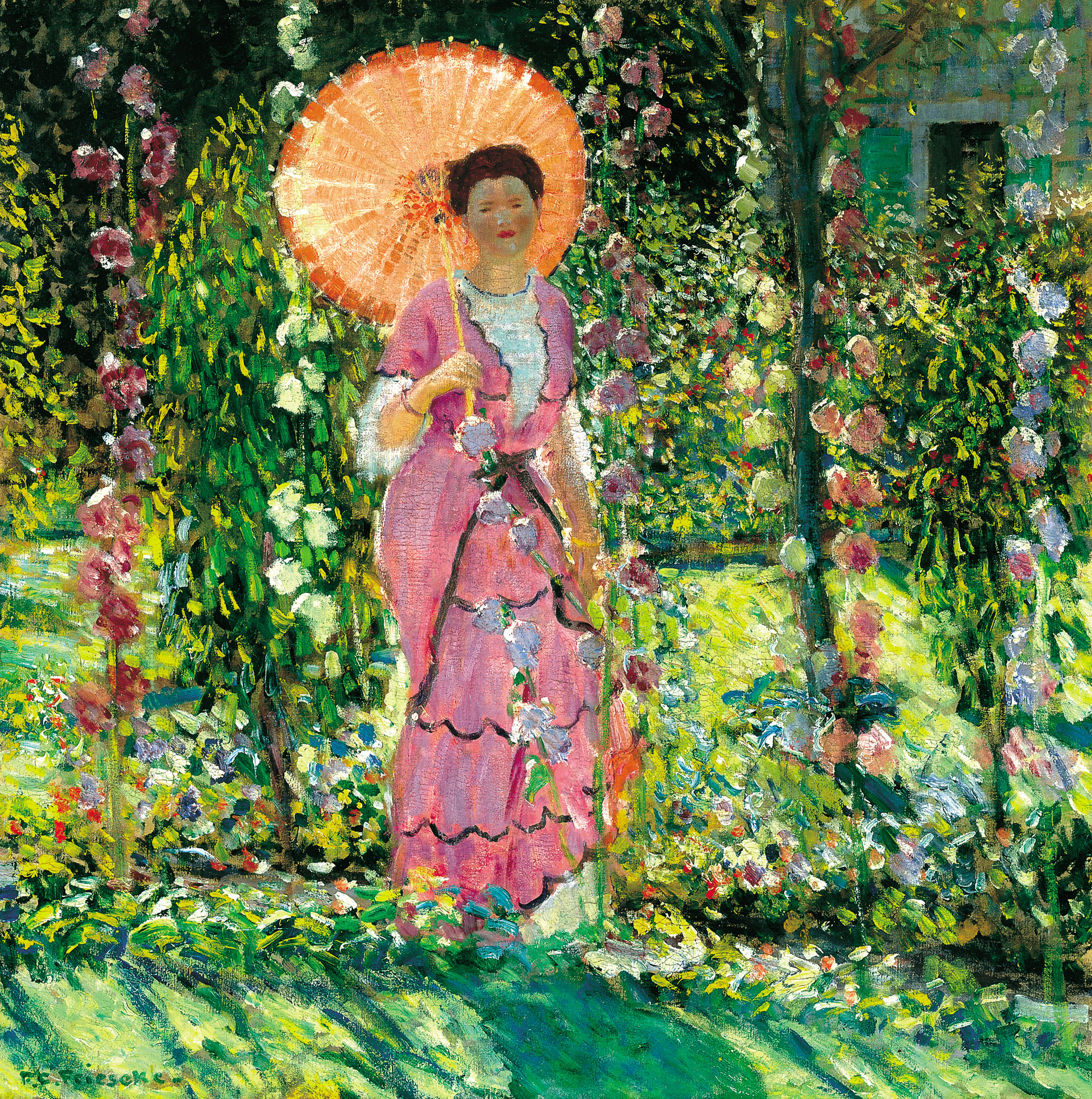
Hollyhocks, ca. 1912–1913

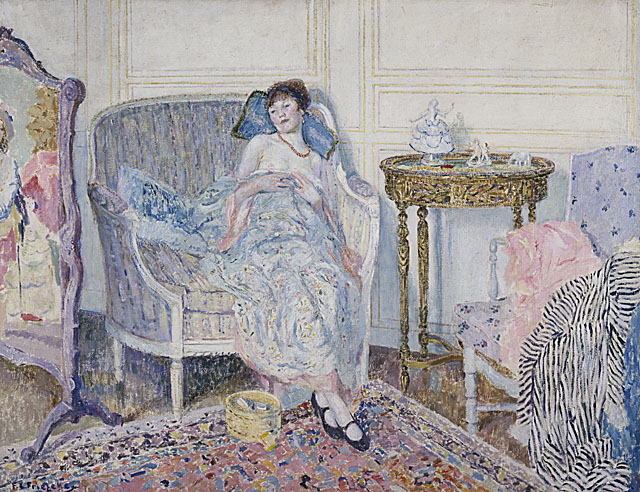
In the Boudoir, 1914

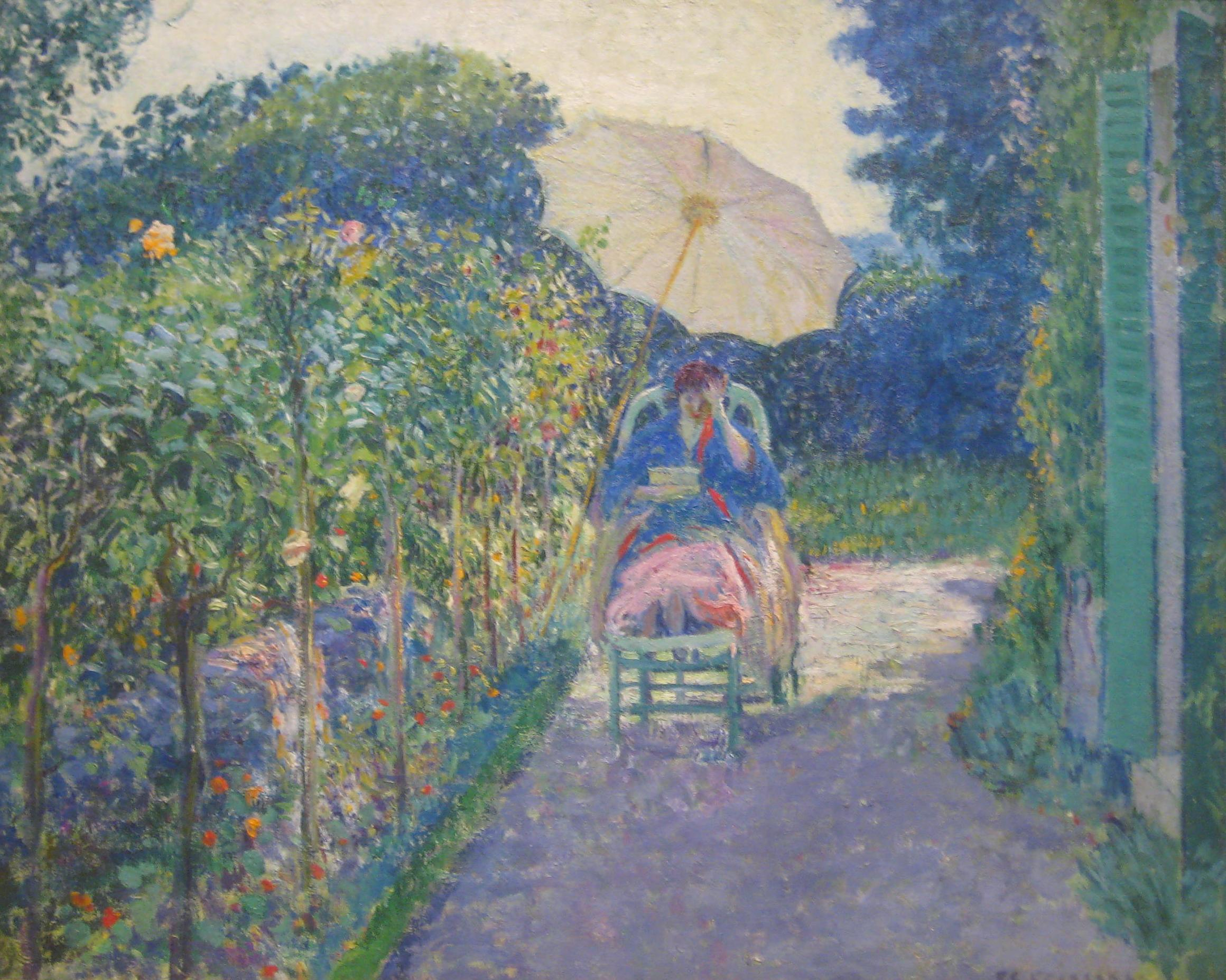
Woman Seated in a Garden, 1914

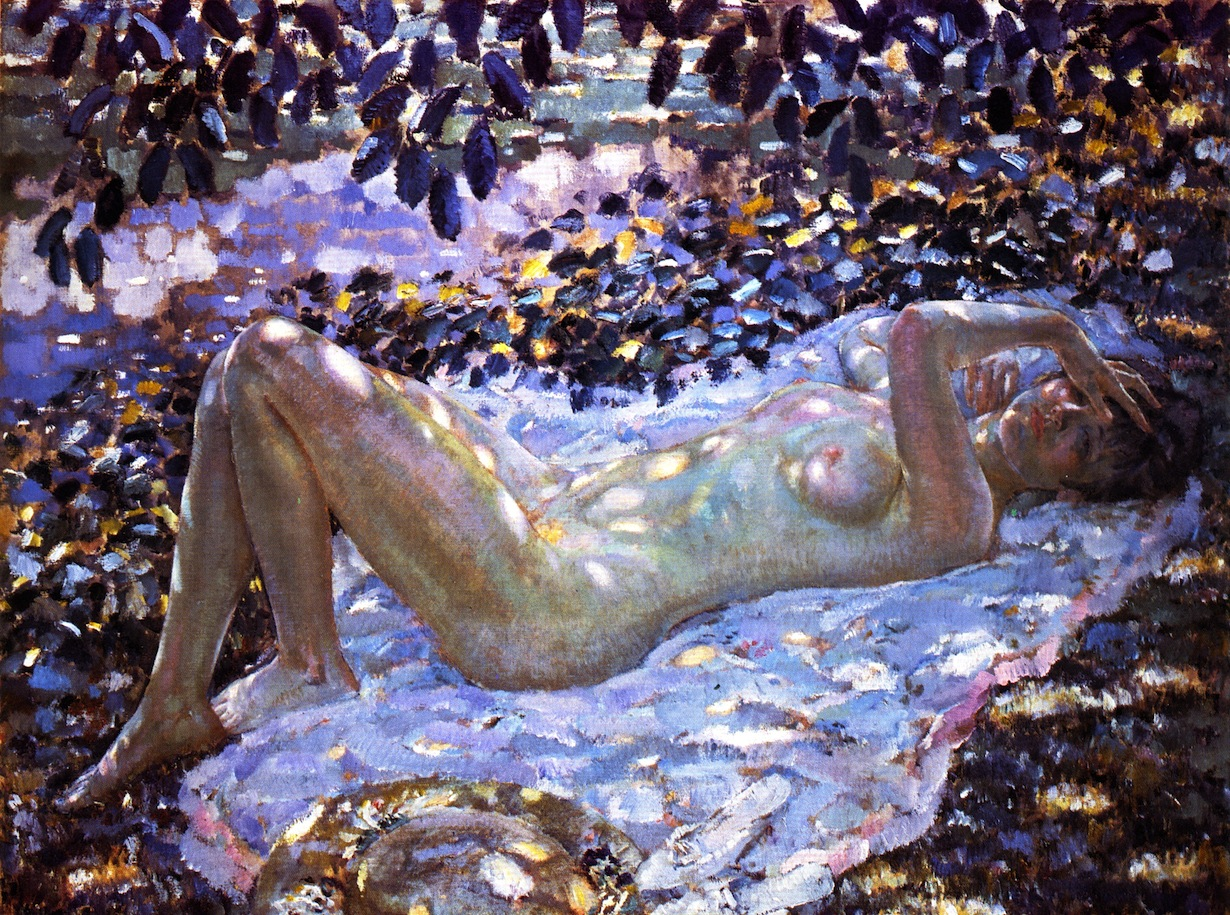
Nude in Dappled Sunlight, 1915

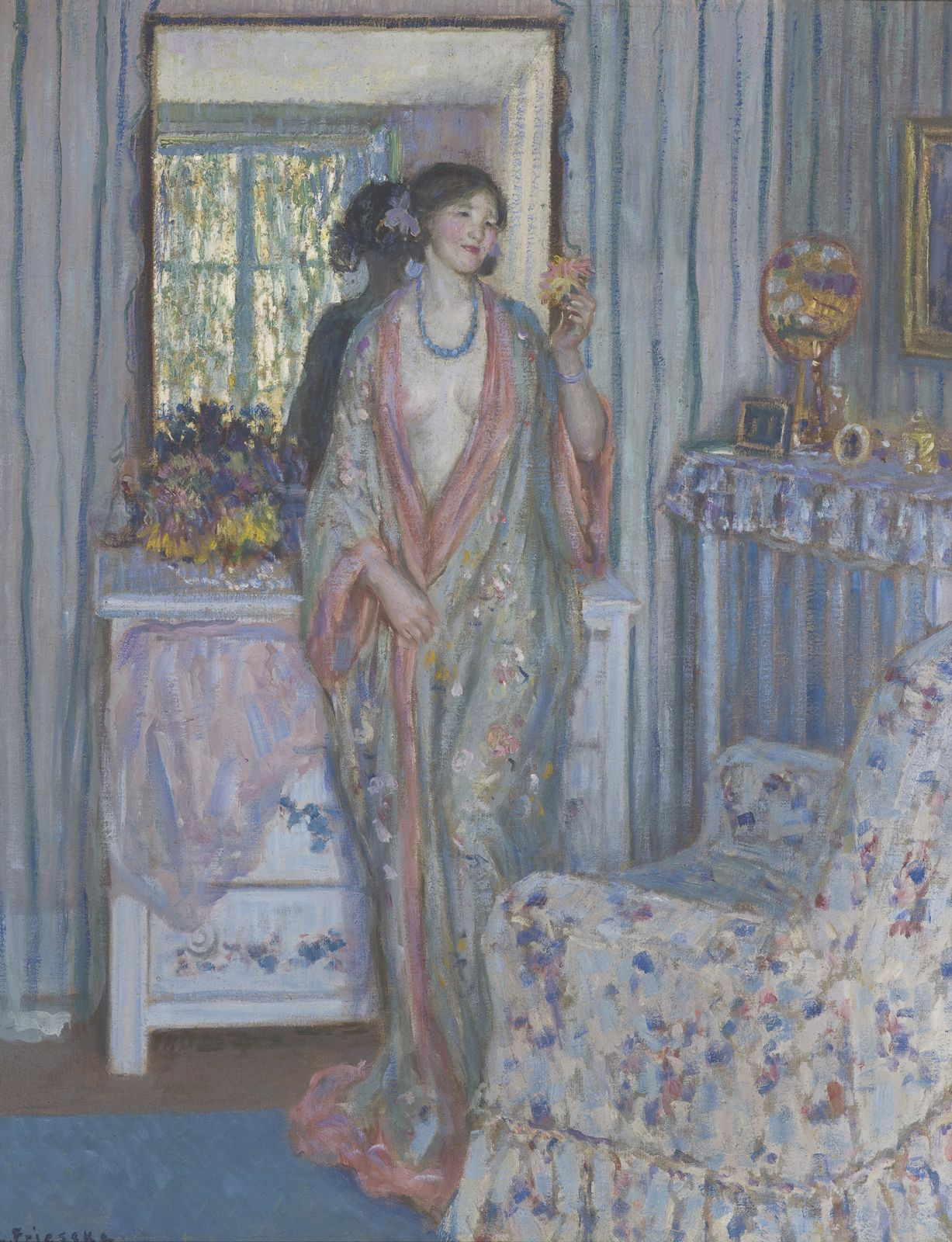
The Robe, 1915

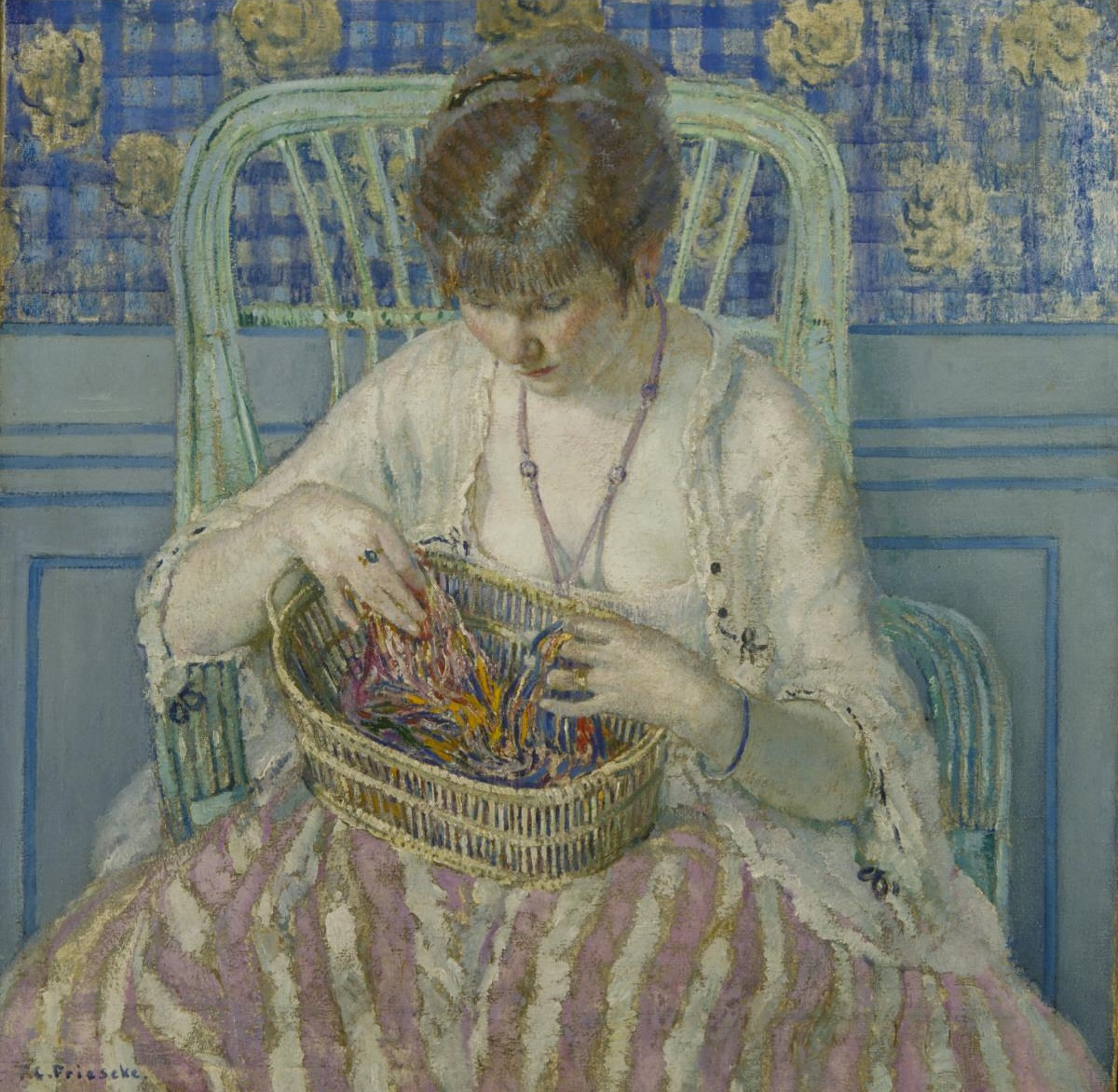
Unraveling Silk, ca. 1915

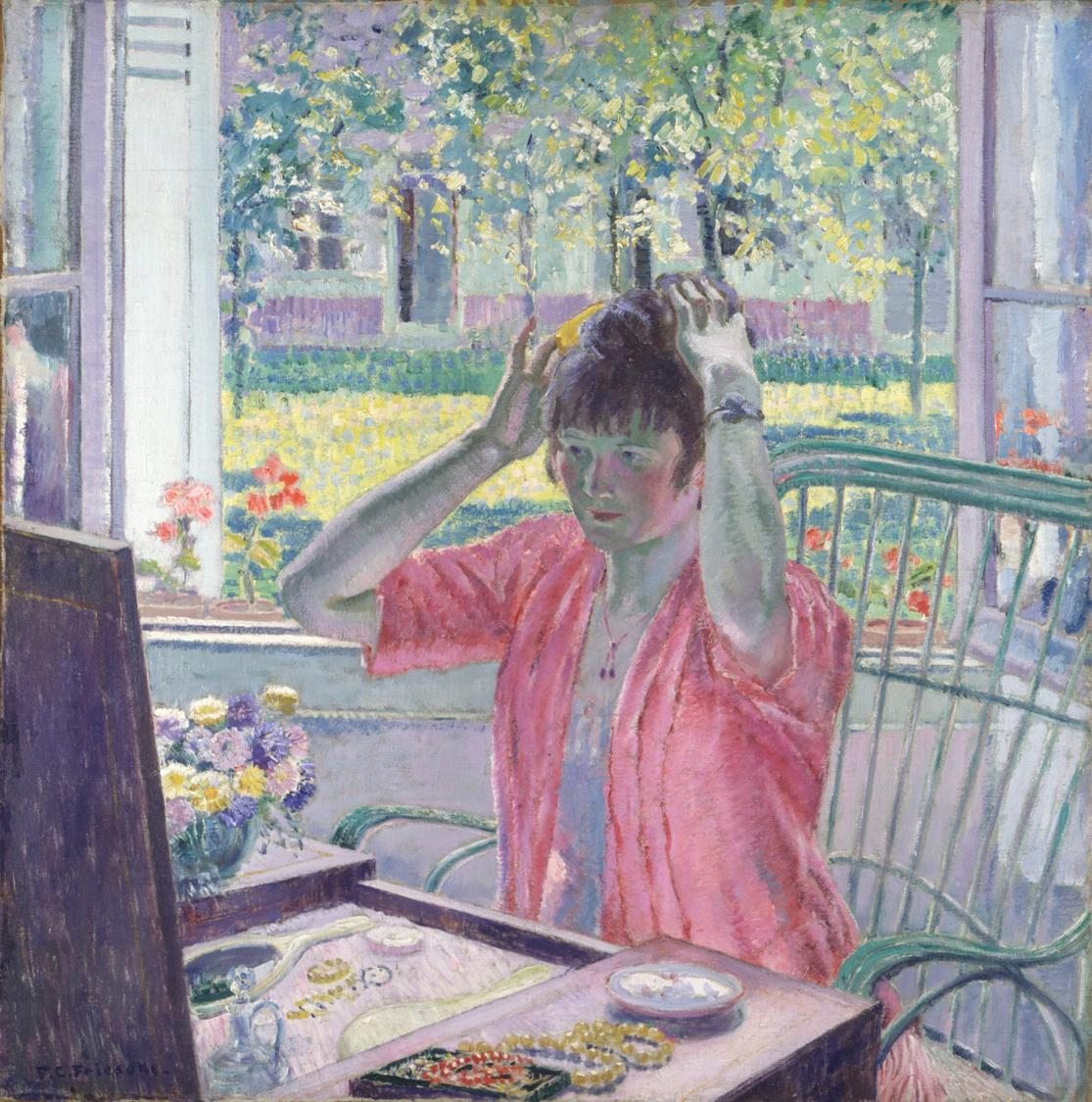
The Window, ca. 1915

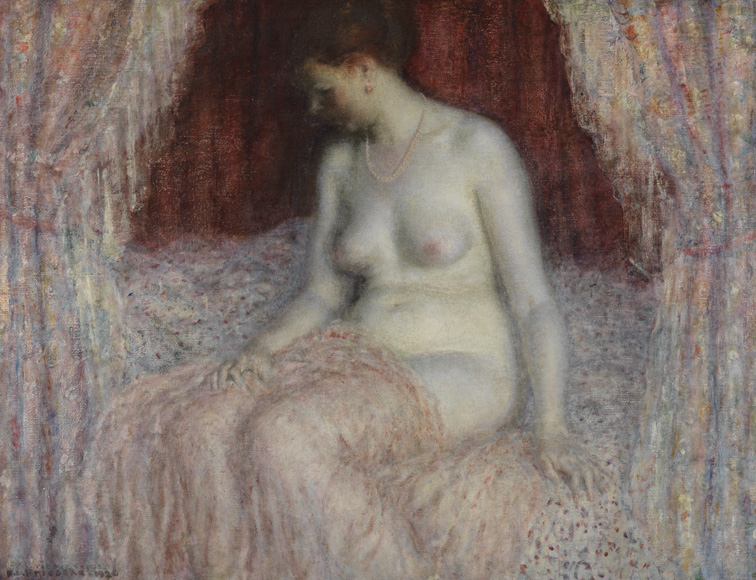
Seated Nude, 1920

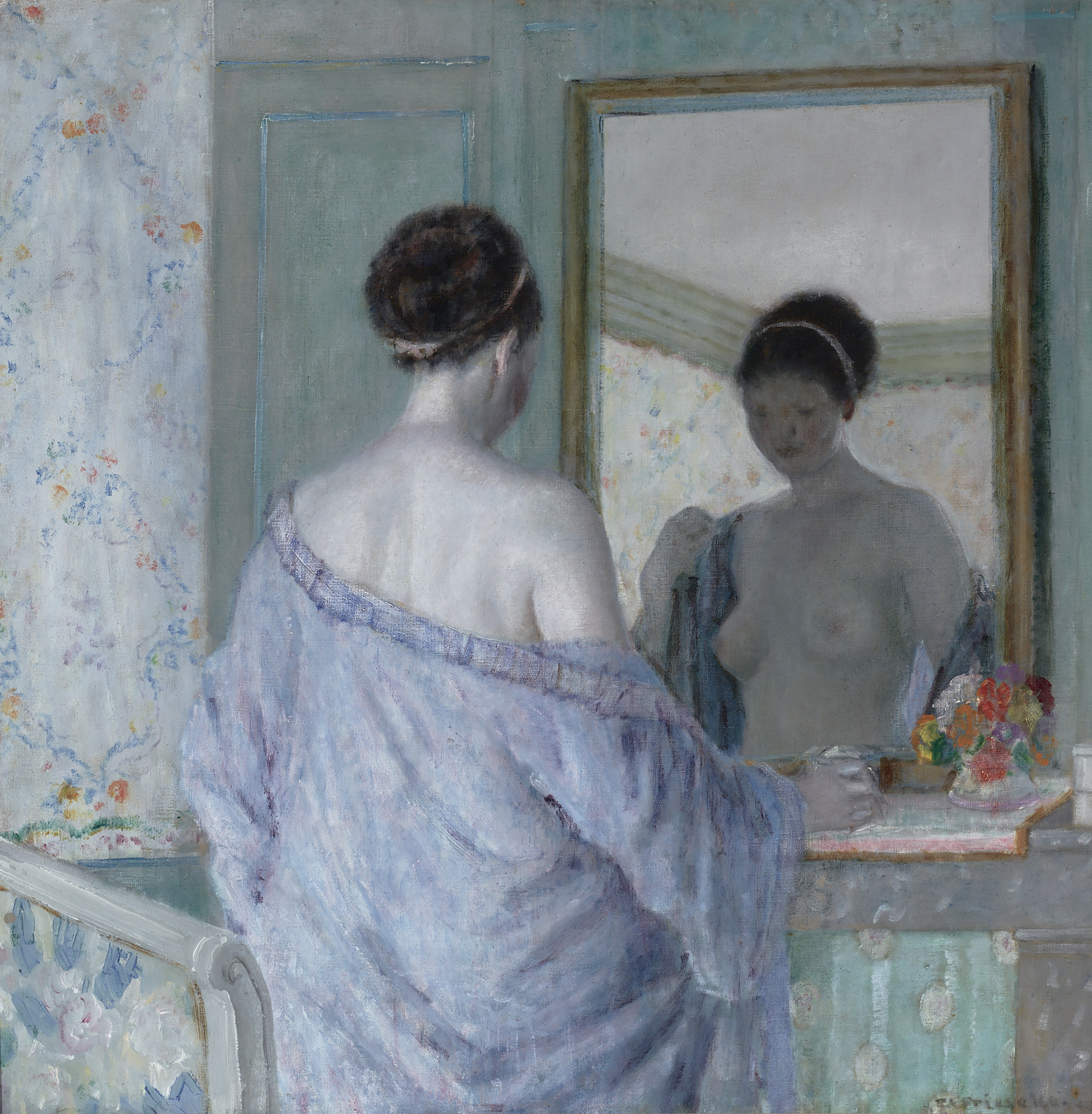
Lady at the Mirror, ca. 1922

== Sources ==
- Dearinger, David B. (2004). Painting and Sculpture in the Collection of National Academy of Design. New York: Hudson Hills Press. ISBN 1-55595-029-9.
- Hoopes, Donelson F. (1972). The American Impressionists. New York: Watson-Guptill Publications. ISBN 0-8230-0212-8.
- Kilmer, Nicholas; Mecklenburg, Virginia M.; Sellin, David; Weinberg, H. Barbara (2001). Frederick Carl Frieseke: The Evolution of an American Impressionist. Savannah, Georgia: Telfair Museum of Art. ISBN 0-691-08922-1.
- Neuhaus, Eugen (1931). The History and Ideals of American Art. Palo Alto, California: Stanford University Press. ISBN 9780804715676. OCLC 491066766.
