= Giverny =

- Commune
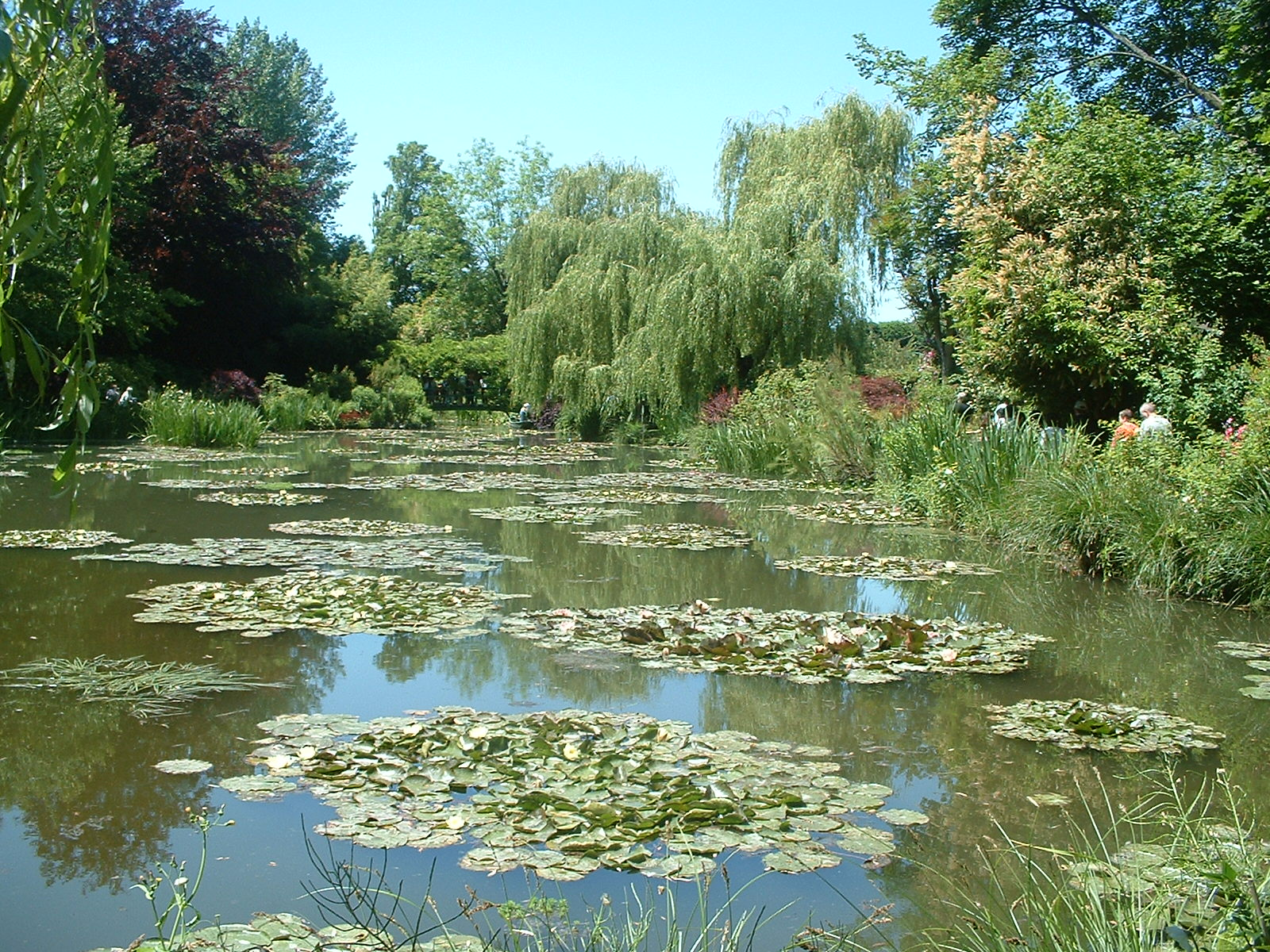
- Water lilies in Claude Monet's garden in Giverny, from which he created his Water Lilies series. (2005)
- Location of Giverny
- Location within France Location within Normandy
- Coordinates: 49°04′37″N 1°31′48″E
- Country: France
- Region: Normandy
- Department: Eure
- Arrondissement: Les Andelys
- Canton: Vernon
- Intercommunality: Seine Normandie Agglomération

Government
  - Mayor (2026–32): Sébastien Depoix
- Area^{1}: 6.46 km^{2} (2.49 sq mi)
- Elevation: 17 m (56 ft)
- Highest elevation: 139 m (456 ft)
- Lowest elevation: 10 m (33 ft)
- Population (2023): 430
  - Density: 67/km^{2} (170/sq mi)
- Time zone: UTC+01:00 (CET)
  - Summer (DST): UTC+02:00 (CEST)
- INSEE/Postal code: 27285 /27620
- ^{1} French Land Register data, which excludes lakes, ponds, glaciers > 1 km^{2} (0.386 sq mi or 247 acres) and river estuaries.

Giverny (French: [ʒivɛʁni]) is a commune in the northern French department of Eure. The village is located on the "right bank" of the river Seine at its confluence with the river Epte. It lies 80 km (50 mi) west-northwest of Paris, in the region of Normandy. It is best known as the location of Claude Monet's garden and home.

Several American Impressionist artists also settled in Giverny, drawn by the landscapes, the overall atmosphere, and the presence of Monet. Other attractions include the Museum of Impressionism Giverny, dedicated to the history of impressionism and the Giverny art colony, and the Hôtel Baudy, which was the center of artistic life in Giverny's heyday. It is now a café and restaurant, with period decoration.

== History ==
A settlement has existed in Giverny since Neolithic times and a monument uncovered attests to this fact. Archeological finds have included bootees dating from Gallo-Roman times and to the earlier 1st and 2nd centuries AD. The town was known in ancient deeds as "Warnacum". The cultivation of grapes has been an occupation of the inhabitants of Giverny since Merovingian times.

The village church dates from the Middle Ages and is built partially in the Romanesque style, though additions have since been made. It is dedicated to Sainte-Radegonde. Most of the present building dates from the 15th century. Inside are 15th-century stone statues, including a Virgin and Child, fragments of 16th-century polychrome stained glass and wall paintings. The village has remained a small rural setting with a modest population (numbering around 301 in 1883 when Monet discovered it) and has since seen a boom in tourism since the restoration of Monet's house and gardens.

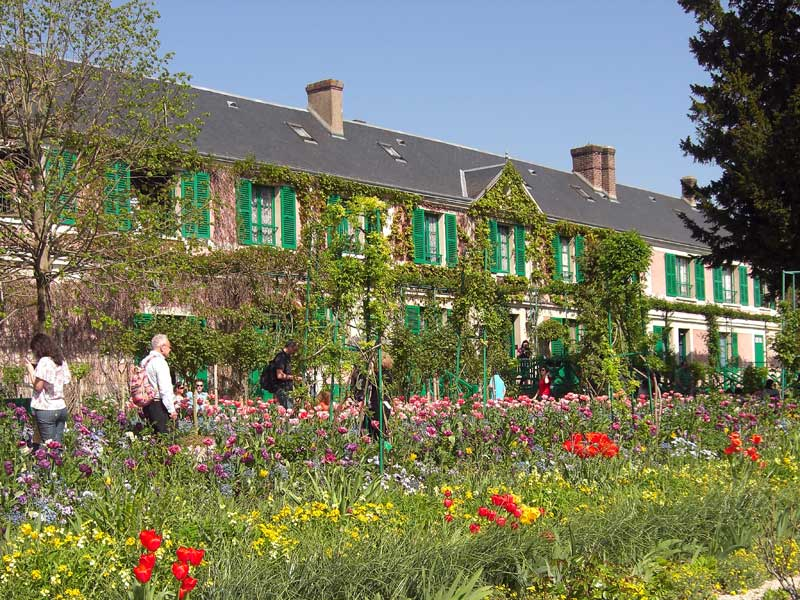
Monet's house in Giverny, Normandy

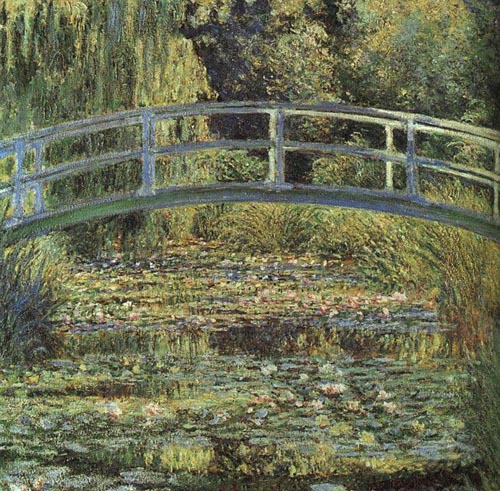
The water lily pond in Monet's garden at Giverny shown in his The Waterlily Pond, green harmony (1899)

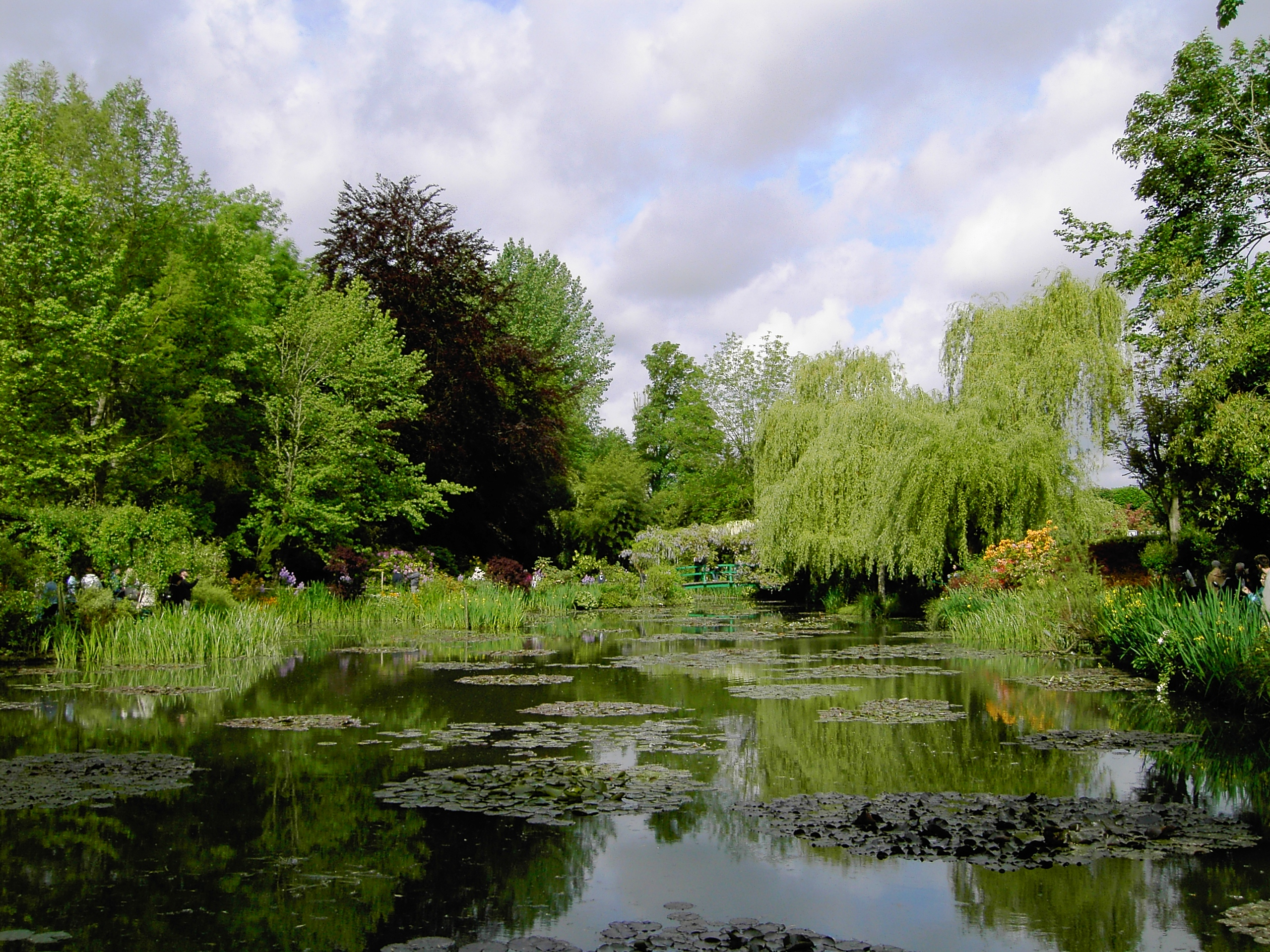
Giverny (summer 2005)

== Monet at Giverny ==
Claude Monet noticed the village of Giverny while looking out of a train window. He made up his mind to move there and rented a house and the area surrounding it. He moved into the house, then known as Le Pressoir, on 29 April 1883, renting it from the landowner Louis-Joseph Singeot. On 17 November 1890 he bought it for 20,000 francs, payable in four annual instalments, and set out to create the gardens he wanted to paint.

Some of his most famous paintings were of his garden in Giverny, famous for its rectangular Clos Normand, with archways of climbing plants entwined around colored shrubs, and the water garden, formed by a tributary to the Epte, with the Japanese bridge, the pond with the water lilies, the wisterias and the azaleas.

Monet died at Giverny on 5 December 1926 and was buried on 8 December in the family grave beside the east end of the village church, where his wife Alice Hoschedé-Monet, his sons Jean and Michel and other members of the Hoschedé family also rest.

== The Giverny Colony ==
Beginning around 1887, several American Impressionist artists settled to work in Giverny, drawn by the landscapes, the overall atmosphere, and the presence of Monet. These included Willard Metcalf, Louis Ritman, Lydia Field Emmet, Theodore Wendel, and John Leslie Breck. Soon many American extended their visits from summer through the entire year. American painter Theodore Earl Butler married Monet's stepdaughter and sometime-model Suzanne Hoschedé there in 1892.

Frederick Carl Frieseke spent every summer from 1906 through 1919 in a residence next door to Monet's. The term Decorative Impressionism was coined in 1911 to describe Frieseke's work, and the term describes the work of a "second wave" of American painters in Giverny such as Richard E. Miller. In December 1910, six of the Giverny artists (Frieseke, Miller, Lawton S. Parker, Guy Rose, Edmund Greacen and Karl Anderson) were given a show at the Madison Gallery in New York which termed them "The Giverny Group."

The First World War largely marked the end of the art colony.

== Attractions ==
Claude Monet's property at Giverny (house and gardens), left by his son to the Académie des Beaux-Arts in 1966, became a Museum opened to public visit in 1980 after completion of large-scale restoration work: the huge Nymphea's studio was restored and the precious collection of Japanese woodblock prints was displayed in several rooms, hung in the manner chosen by the master himself; the gardens were replanted as they once were. The house became a popular tourist attraction (the Claude Monet Foundation), particularly in the summer when the flowers are in bloom. The house and gardens, which belong to the Académie des Beaux-Arts, are open seasonally; in 2026 they were open from 1 April to 1 November.

The other main attraction of the village is the Museum of Impressionism Giverny, dedicated to the history of impressionism and its continuation in the Giverny art colony and along the valley of the River Seine. From 27 March to 5 July 2026 it presented Avant les nymphéas. Monet découvre Giverny, 1883–1890 (Before the Water Lilies: Monet Discovers Giverny), an exhibition on the painter's first years in the village, from his arrival in 1883 to the end of 1890.

The Hôtel Baudy was a center of artistic life in the Giverny heyday. It is now still a café and restaurant, with period decoration.

Giverny is also located 9.0 km from the Middle Age castle of La Roche-Guyon and the Seine River Bank.

== See also ==
- Communes of Eure

== Bibliography ==
- Katherine M. Bourguignon (ed), Impressionist Giverny. A Colony of Artists, 1885-1915 (Giverny: Terra Foundation for American Art, 2007).
