= California Art Club =

Arts organization in California, United States

The California Art Club (CAC) is one of the oldest, still active arts organizations in California. Founded in December 1909, it originally evolved out of The Painters' Club of Los Angeles, a short-lived male-only arts organization that lasted from 1906–1909. The new organization was more inclusive, as it accepted women, sculptors and out-of-state artists.

Most of the major early California painters belonged to the CAC, including Franz Bischoff, Carl Oscar Borg, Edgar Payne, Julia Bracken Wendt, and William Wendt. As the members of the first generation of California Plein-Air Painters aged and died, the membership was filled by younger professional painters, including Millard Sheets, Mabel Alvarez, Emil Kosa Jr., and watercolorist Rex Brandt, along with amateur painters and commercial artists. Other notable members include Sir Winston Churchill, Dean Cornwell, Nicolai Fechin, Sam Hyde Harris, Alfredo Ramos Martinez, and Richard Neutra. Today its membership consists of representational artists and sculptors, but it is broadly inclusive and includes many women painters as well as painters and sculptors who emigrated to the United States from Europe and Asia. The CAC hosts an annual Gold Medal Exhibition each year along with a number of other smaller public and special museum exhibitions. Headquartered in one of the large bungalows that was part of the historic Vista del Arroyo Hotel in Pasadena, the California Art Club has a number of chapters throughout California.

== Origins ==
The history of the California Art Club begins with an earlier organization, The Painters' Club of Los Angeles. On the evening of March 10, 1906, a number of painters who lived in the Los Angeles area met together with the purpose of forming a club. Soon afterward, on the evening of March 17, eleven of these same men met at the studio of William Swift Daniell (1865-1933). After some discussion, it was unanimously decided to form a club then and there, and the Painters’ Club of Los Angeles was born with the goal to arrange exhibitions and further the fine arts in Southern California. The eleven founding Charter Members included Antony E. Anderson (1863-1939), Carl Oscar Borg (1879-1947), William Henry Cole (1870-1955), Albert Clinton Conner (1848-1929), Frank C. Conner, William Swift Daniell, David H. Dunn, Frank Elwin Evans, Frank Rennsselear Liddell (1864-1923), Hanson Duvall Puthuff (1875-1972), and George Thomas Winterburn (1865-1953). According to the membership roster, the Painters' Club grew and eventually numbered around 42 members. After several years and a number of exhibitions it became apparent to the members that the scope of the organization, which was open only to male painters, was too limited and a consensus arose to dissolve the organization in order to form one that was wider in scope. The Painters' Club of Los Angeles was disbanded in December 1909, but there would be a new group to follow, "to be called the California Art Club." A core group of members from the Painters' Club - Charles Percy Austin (1883-1948), Franz Bischoff (1864-1929), Carl Oscar Borg, Benjamin Chambers Brown (1865-1942), Frank Rennsselear Liddell, Hanson Puthuff, and William Wendt (1845-1946) - would be instrumental in laying the groundwork for the nascent California Art Club, as well as supplying its first three presidents.

== Founding ==
The California Art Club was founded in December 1909, immediately after The Painters' Club of Los Angeles was disbanded. Although the date and location of the first club meeting is unknown, the second was held February 5, 1910 in Franz Bischoff's Studio, located at 320 Pasadena Avenue, South Pasadena. Among its founding and earliest members were Hector Alliot (1862-1919), Antony E. Anderson (1863-1939), Charles Percy Austin, Franz Bischoff, Carl Oscar Borg, Benjamin Chambers Brown, Mauritz DeHaaff (1877-1948), Allen Durand (1865-1939), Aaron E. Kilpatrick (1872-1953), Frank Rennsselear Liddell, Everett Carroll Maxwell, William A. Matern (1867-1923), Frederick Roland Miner (1876-1935), John Hubbard Rich (1876-1954), Rob Wagner (1872-1942), Jack Wells [or Welles], William Wendt, and most likely Wendt's wife, sculptor Julia Bracken Wendt (1868-1942).

One of the main objectives behind the founding of the new club was to expand its membership and encourage others to participate - "No longer limited to male painters based in L.A., the Club opened its membership to women, sculptors and artists living as far away as New York." By the time of the club's Second Annual Exhibition in 1911, membership had increased by about thirty members, including nine women: Helena Adele Dunlap (1876-1955), Helma Heynsen Jahn (1874-1925), Mary Ann Van Alstine Bartow (1848-1924), Alma May Cook (1884-1973), S. Henrietta Dorn Housh (1855-1919), Helen Hutchinson (1866-?), Louise Elizabeth Garden MacLeod (1857-1944), Lydie G. Price, and Elizabeth Waggoner. By early 1912 Xarifa Hamilton Towner (1881-1918) would also join.

Frank Renssellear Liddell served as the first club president from 1909-10. Liddell was succeeded by William Wendt who filled the office of president twice: from 1911-14 as the second president, and from 1917-18 as the fourth. Wendt's terms bookended the club's third president, Benjamin Chambers Brown, who held that office from 1915-16. The organization grew quickly in prestige under Wendt and Brown, connecting itself with the newly formed Museum of History, Science and Art in Exposition Park. The Art Committee of the new museum's Gallery of Fine Arts included at least four CAC members, including Everett C. Maxwell, who was both an Honorary CAC Member as well as Curator of the County Museum Art Gallery. The club began holding its annual exhibitions in the new space less than a year after the new museum was founded and would continue to do so for more than two decades.

As the CAC was being founded, California Impressionism was just beginning to emerge in Southern California. Many club members had studied overseas in European ateliers like the Académie Delécluse, the Académie Julian, and the École des Beaux-Arts. Benjamin Brown studied at the Académie Julian with Jean-Paul Laurens (1838-1921) and Jean-Joseph Benjamin-Constant (1845-1902); Rob Wagner was also a student at Académies Julian and Delécluse. John Hubbard Rich spent four years at the Art Students League in New York City, then spent time at the School of the Boston Museum as well as two years studying in Europe. Along with classical atelier painting, the influences of French Impressionism were starting to be felt. Helena Dunlap studied with William Merritt Chase (1849-1916) in New York City and André Lhote (1885-1962) in Paris, and Charles Percy Austin was a pupil of John Twachtman (1853-1902). Others like Julia Bracken Wendt, William Wendt, and Edgar Payne studied at schools like the Chicago Art Institute. Through the work of its artists and its annual exhibitions, the CAC was greatly responsible for popularizing the Impressionist style in California. Authorities like Professor William Gerdts have long identified California Impressionism as a regional variation of American Impressionism which was a very broad movement that was loosely bound to the French style. Most American and California Impressionists adopted the painterly brush work, brighter palette and colored shadows of French Impressionism and the elementary practice of sketching outdoors, directly from nature or en plein air.

== Early years and California Impressionism ==
From its first exhibitions, the California Art Club became identified with Impressionism. In 1913, in the national magazine Arts Journal, the writer E.C. Maxwell wrote that "From a dozen different writers upon subjects pertaining to the development and trend of art in the west, the word has gone forth to the world that California, that land of golden light and purple shadows, is destined in the course of the next few years to give us a new school of landscape painting...Conditions seem right for a renaissance of art in California...If this art epoch of golden prophecy does not come to pass, it will not be the fault of the California Art Club." The activities of the California Art Club were chronicled in the pages of the Los Angeles Times, the Herald Examiner and the Pasadena Star News. The art columnist for the Times, Antony Anderson was a founding member of the club and he was lavish in his praise of its exhibitions and its leaders, men like William Wendt, Benjamin Chambers Brown and Jack Wilkinson Smith.

In the club's formative years, meetings were held at locations around Los Angeles, including members' homes and studios, various schools and galleries, and the Earl House, 2425 Wilshire Boulevard in Westlake Park. (now MacArthur Park). By the early 1920s, the club resolved to seek a more permanent location and laid out plans for a building fund with a goal to raise $150,000 primarily by exhibiting and selling artwork. CAC artist and Managing Director Walter Farrington Moses (1874-1947) led the effort of achieving their goal. A one-night exhibition was held at the Los Angeles Philharmonic Auditorium in 1923; included along with smaller donations was “$500 on the spot.”

Though the CAC as an organization is most often identified with California Impressionism, some CAC members worked in and experimented with other modes of painting and sculpting. Helena Dunlap (1876-1955), an early CAC member and exhibitor, also went on to found the Modern Art Society of Los Angeles in 1916 with five other CAC members: Bert Cressey (1883-1944), Meta Cressey (1882-1964), Edgar Keller (1868-1932), Henrietta Shore (1880-1963) and Karl Yens (1868-1945). At the CAC's Annual Exhibition at Exposition Park in 1931, members Ruth Peabody (1893-1966) and Phil Dike (1906–1990) won top honors for their work, which were dubbed "ultra modern." Another member, Stanton Macdonald-Wright (1890-1973), was a co-creator of Synchromism, an early abstract, color-based mode of painting which influenced artists like Donna Norine Schuster (1883-1953). In 1922 Mabel Alvarez became a member of the Group of Eight, along with Clarence Hinkle, Henri De Kruif, John Hubbard Rich, Donna Schuster, E. Roscoe Shrader, Edouard Vysekal, and Luvena Buchanan Vysekal. Organized largely by the Vyeskals, the group had a basis in the progressive art movement in California.

While the painters of the early California Art Club did not adhere to a stylistic code of any kind, they were all representational artists who worked from life, whether it was outdoors, from nature or in the studio from models. The California Art Club was part of a broadly representational movement that held sway in California long after more modern styles of painting became popular elsewhere. During the 1910s and the "Roaring 20s" when the American economy bounded back from the post-World War I recession, the California Art Club grew in membership and prestige, but it lacked a permanent clubhouse. That changed in 1926, when the wealthy heiress and art patron Aline Barnsdall (1882-1946) gifted her home Hollyhock House, designed by Frank Lloyd Wright, to the CAC to use as its headquarters as a fifteen-year loan. The club moved into the property atop Hollywood, known as Olive Hill, the following year. Gradually, during the 1930s, proponents of more modern movements also began to gain a foothold and younger patrons began to purchase their works instead of those of the California Impressionists.

== The Hollyhock House years (1927-42) and the Depression ==
By 1923, the idea of a new permanent home was gaining momentum. During “an animated meeting” at their temporary headquarters at 623 Park View, the CAC looked at two feasible options: Aline Barnsdall had offered the club use of Olive Hill, her estate in Hollywood; a second option comprised another location at “the southwest corner of Grand View and Third Street.” Two years later the idea of a permanent clubhouse was still enthusiastically discussed, but 1925 saw the club forced to restructure their project due to its being “suspended temporarily on the resignation of the business manager.” Strong interest remained despite the fact that they hadn’t yet reached their fundraising goal. With the club's efforts stalled, Aline Barnsdall approached the City of Los Angeles about managing a section of her estate as a cultural arts center.

Overlooking Hollywood Boulevard to the east and presenting panoramic views west towards the Pacific Ocean, the 36-acre hilltop estate south of Griffith Park was originally slated to include multiple structures dedicated to the arts. An eventual rift between Barnsdall and architect Frank Lloyd Wright meant that only three buildings would be completed: Hollyhock House, named after Miss Barnsdall's favorite flower, and two other structures referred to as “Residences A and B.”

Eventually in 1926 the City of Los Angeles agreed to take eight acres. The discussions between the City and Miss Barnsdall about how the property could be used included a stipulation that the California Art Club be given a lease on Hollyhock House lasting fifteen years. In the California Art Club Bulletin, the club's monthly publication, CAC President Edwin Roscoe Shrader (1878-1960) wrote accepting the gift: “Aline Barnsdall has brought to fruition her plans to establish a cultural center amidst the beauty of Olive Hill. The California Art Club happily, gratefully, accepts its share in this great movement and opens on August 31 the palatial home granted to the Club for fifteen years as its new galleries and headquarters.” The club feted Miss Barnsdall at a dinner and made her an Honorary Member.

The new clubhouse allowed the CAC to present lectures, club meetings, and black tie exhibition receptions. By early 1929, the CAC had attracted some 5,000 visitors to events and exhibitions at Hollyhock House. In late 1929, the CAC hosted the first Black American art exhibition in Los Angeles. The exhibit included work by Henry Ossawa Tanner and renowned Los Angeles architect, Paul R. Williams.

The club initially maintained a semblance of normality during the Depression as monthly club meetings continued to attract members - a “Social Meeting” held on December 19, 1931, was attended by 175 members and guests. Prominent new members joined the club, such as Colin Campbell Cooper (1856-1937), Dean Cornwell (1892-1960), and Alfredo Ramos Martinez (1872-1946). CAC member Richard Neutra debated architecture with Rudolph Schindler, José Clemente Orozco visited a club meeting in April 1930 while working on his murals at Pomona College, and David Alfaro Siqueiros gave a lecture at a dinner in his honor on June 17, 1932.

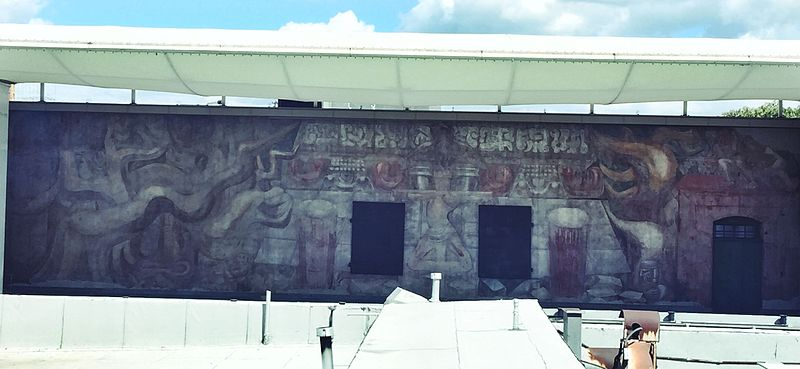
América Tropical: Oprimida y Destrozada por los Imperialismos (1932), photographed in 2016

A week before his CAC lecture, Siqueiros had unveiled his first Los Angeles mural, Street Meeting, done on an exterior wall at Chouinard Art School. The group assisting him included CAC members Henri De Kruif, Robert Merrell Gage, Barse Miller, Paul Starrett Sample, and Millard Sheets. Gage was then the current CAC President, Sample having held the post in 1931; Miller was 1st vice president. Siqueiros had consulted with Neutra about new approaches for Street Meeting that might better withstand the hot and dry Southern California climate. Shortly after his lecture at the Hollyhock House, Siqueiros would begin work on América Tropical with the help of 29 artists including CAC members Dean Cornwell, Karoly Fulop, and Frederick John Vrain Schwankowsky.

The stock market crash of 1929 was the big blow—it meant a decline in exhibition attendance and patronage. Then, as the Great Depression deepened, club membership gradually waned. This decline was somewhat inevitable as the founding members of the CAC aged, moved away or died throughout the 30s and 40s. William Wendt and Edgar Payne were living in Laguna Beach and had become active in the Laguna Beach Art Association. Membership fees for “Artists…and Lay Members” were reduced and it was noted in a bulletin that “a few more new members would enable us to join in the popular sport of ‘Balancing the Budget.’” Also, following the example of other groups, the Club “cancelled all unpaid dues prior to January 1932, providing the current dues [were] paid in full.” In addition, it created an Assistance Fund for any member needing financial aid. The deep impact of the Depression on the CAC was seen in “a dwindling membership,” and corroborated reports that “the [Hollyhock] house was in pretty bad shape towards the end of [their] tenure” when their fifteen-year lease with the Hollyhock House ended in 1942. After briefly giving the club an extension of their lease in January 1942, L.A. Parks Commission forced CAC to abandon Olive Hill by March of that year.

The club established a temporary headquarters at Plummer Park until about August 1942, after which they met at the Women’s Club of Hollywood for a year. After the Women's Club, monthly meetings were held at the Masonic Temple from October 1943-February 1945. At the January 26, 1945, meeting at this location, Los Angeles Mayor Fletcher Bowron and Supervisor John Anson Ford were guests.

== Postwar years ==
In 1946 the California Art Club partnered with the Veterans Administration to present the First Annual G.I. Art Exhibit at the Museum of History, Science and Art in Exposition Park. "First prize winners are given membership in the art club for one year with all fees and dues waived." There were forty-one exhibiting G.I. artists in all.

In 1947, the CAC (along with other art clubs that exhibited there, including the Painters and Sculptors Club of L.A.) abruptly lost the museum venue where they had held their Annual Exhibitions since 1914. The new museum director, James H. Breasted Jr., wanted to open the venue up to more artists, not just those in the clubs. It didn't go over well, and the headlines made it to Life Magazine: “The outraged artists set up their own canvasses on the museum’s steps and terrace and along the walls as examples of what should have been shown inside. Then they marched around the museum demanding that the director resign. Instead…[Director] James H. Breasted Jr. remained in his oak-doored office and quietly called police. Three radio patrol cars rolled up to the museum’s entrance and a swarm of police waded through canvasses of sunsets, mountain landscapes, pretty nudes and Chinese vases."

Without headquarters or an exhibition venue to exhibit their work, meetings and exhibitions were held in less prestigious venues and patronage became a secondary concern. Annual exhibitions were held at venues such as the Greek Theater in Griffith Park (1949–66), Brand Library in Glendale (1979, 1982, 1990), and even a short-lived California Art Club Gallery located at 1309 Westwood Boulevard for a handful of years. Meeting places during this period included Channing Hall at United Methodist Church (March 1945-February 1947) and Rexall Square (September 1947-May 1949), with the group eventually settling into Rancho Golf Club House for two decades (September 1949 – 1969). Victor Matson was President of the California Art Club in 1961 and 1962. He was a landscape painter and an able organizer who had been active in many of the Southland art organizations. By the late 1960s and 1970s, the ranks of the California Art Club consisted primarily of amateur artists, but there was still a small group of professional painters that were active, such as Sam Hyde Harris.

== The California Art Club Bulletin 1925-1994 ==
In November 1925, CAC President Shrader wrote in the foreword of the inaugural issue of The California Art Club Bulletin, "The Bulletin will fill a long-felt want in the activities of the Club." Published monthly for nearly 70 years, it reported on club activities, exhibitions, member news, meetings, lectures, and more, both within the club and around greater Los Angeles. After the July 1994 issue, the Bulletin was redesigned and renamed the California Art Club Newsletter, starting with the Summer 1994 issue. It continues to be printed for the club membership on a quarterly basis and includes articles written by art historians and scholars.

== California Art Club Newsletter 1994-present ==
Published by the California Art Club, the Newsletter is a quarterly journal that documents California's traditional arts heritage, both historic and contemporary. Each issue contains unique essays about artists and art movements written by art historians, museum curators, art writers, and artists. The publication includes "news briefs," club activities, membership news, book reviews, and exhibition listings.

Although the California Art Club was established in 1909, the first issue, Volume 1, No. 1, was printed in December 1925 and originally named "The California Art Club Bulletin" with artist Ralph Holmes (1876-1963) as its first editor. The "Bulletin" was published as a monthly periodical to keep members informed of fellow members and the goings-on of the local burgeoning Los Angeles art scene. The publication operated as a volunteer effort and was managed by several editors who were members of the club. However, after the Great Depression, Modernism, and World War II, the California Art Club fell on hard times, but still managed to exist, howbeit on a much smaller and scale.

With the 1990s resurgence of representational art forms, the California Art Club experienced a revival that was launched in 1993. The organization began to re-brand itself as a prime leader in the contemporary-traditional art movement and recognized the need for a scholarly publication to help further their mission. Under the newly named editor-in-chief Elaine Adams, the June 1994 issue was renamed the "California Art Club Newsletter." Over the years, the Bulletin has expanded from its single front-and-back 8-1/2 x 11 page to its present 36-page quarterly journal printed by Typecraft in Pasadena, California.

=== List of editors ===
Artist Ralph Holmes (1876–1963) served as the first editor of the "California Art Club Bulletin" from December 1925 to January 1927. From February 1927 to December 1931, artist Louise Everett (1899–1959) served as editor; and from January to December 1932 John Coolidge was the editor. For ten years the Bulletin took a hiatus until 1942 when Edward Lanser became its editor and changed the publication's name to "C.A.C. Bulletin: The Voice of the California Art Club." Lanser served as its editor until April 1948. Then, under Mary Jarrett who served as the new editor until 1954, the publication was renamed as "The Art Bulletin." Next, artist Vic Carl Houser (1895-1972) served as editor until May 1958; followed by artist Horace "H.E." Edmund Huey until March 1959, and in April 1959 Mary Jarrett returned to serve as editor, and then in June 1960 Vic Carl Houser returned as editor until April 1965. The Bulletin went into hiatus again until April 1968 when it published only one issue that year under Edris N. Baker as the editor. The next issue came out in October 1969 with artist Kaffy Reinhardt as the editor. Ruth Jones served as editor of the Bulletin until May 1994. Elaine Adams became editor-in-chief and renamed the publication as the "California Art Club Newsletter," which continues today in 2017 under her management.

== Revival of the CAC ==
By the early 1990s the membership of the California Art Club had been severely reduced. Peter Seitz Adams, a member in earlier years (he exhibited in the 68th Annual Gold Medal Exhibition in 1977), was contacted by longtime patron member Verna Gunther and 43rd CAC President Charles I. Harris (1922–2012) to take over the helm of the neglected California Art Club; Adams was elected the 44th president of the California Art Club in October 1993. His wife, Elaine Adams, managed the business of the organization, eventually becoming the executive director and CEO. In June 1994 Elaine Adams became editor-in-chief of the CAC Bulletin and immediately changed its name to the California Art Club Newsletter and soon expanded the publication to include scholarly articles about art history and profiles on contemporary artists of the CAC. The first wave of painters to join the reorganized California Art Club included Dan Goozeé, Steve Huston, Stephen E. Mirich, William Stout and Tim Solliday (December 1993), (January 1994), Alexey Steele and Jove Wang (February 1994), Daniel W. Pinkham and Sunny Apinchapong-Yang (June 1994), Meredith B. Abbott, John Budicin, Marcia Burtt, Karl Dempwolf, Richard Rackus, Roy Rose, and Leonid Steele (July 1994). A number of these artists consisted of students of Theodore Lukits (1897-1992) or the Russian landscape and figurative painter Sergei Bongart (1918–1985), both of whom had been CAC members themselves.

== Gold Medal Exhibition ==
The Gold Medal Exhibition is held each spring. Previous locations include: the Autry Museum of the American West, Pasadena Museum of History, USC Fisher Museum of Art, Pasadena Museum of California Art, and Luckman Fine Arts Complex at California State University, Los Angeles. Works are juried into the exhibition. Previously, at least two Gold Medals were awarded at each exhibition, but sometimes numbered as many as five per exhibition. The medals were voted on by the participating artist members of the organization. However, in 2016 the practice of presenting awards was discontinued.

The look and design of the medals changed throughout the years and were created by various club members. Along with the award medals given out at the Annual Exhibitions, the practice of which dates back at least to 1926, there were a number of Memorial Medals, Silver Medals, and Medals of Honor that were given to members to honor their services and special contributions to the club. In particular is the Medal of Honor created by Philip Paval around 1953. This medal was awarded in 1954 to Sir Winston Churchill when the statesman was invited by Paval to join the Club as an Honorary CAC Member. Churchill accepted and the medal is presently on display in the Collection of Chartwell House in the U.K.

== Special exhibitions ==
In 1996, the California Art Club organized the California Wetlands Exhibition at the Natural History Museum in historic Exposition Park in Los Angeles. In May through August 1998, the CAC mounted Treasures of the Sierra Nevada at the Natural History Museum of Los Angeles County. The Carnegie Museum in Oxnard, California, hosted a large exhibition of works by painters from the California Art Club in 1994, entitled, "The California Art Club: 85 Years of Art". In 1997, a traveling exhibition which contrasted the work of American Impressionists and Classical Realist painters from the East and Midwestern United States along with the California Impressionists titled, "East Coast Ideals West Coast Concepts," traveled from the Carnegie Museum in Oxnard to the Springville Museum of Art in Springville, Utah to the Academy of Art College in San Francisco. The California Art Club also organized and sponsored a traveling exhibition entitled, "Theodore Lukits, An American Orientalist," dedicated to the Asian-themed works of Thedore Lukits, who had first been a member of the California Art Club in 1922 and was later made a Life Member. This exhibition of colorful still lifes and figurative works originated at the Pacific Asia Museum in the fall of 1998 and traveled to the Carnegie Art Museum in the winter of 1998 and 1999, then concluded at the Muckenthaller Cultural Center in Fullerton, California, in the spring of 1999. Later in 1999, the California Art Club began a relationship with the Frederick R. Weisman Museum of Art at Pepperdine University in Malibu with the exhibition entitled, "On Location in Malibu".

== Membership ==
The California Art Club membership is broad, with fewer than 2,000 members in a number of categories of membership. Signature Members are the most established painters who have been approved for membership by their peers from the ranks of Artist Members. Artist Members are juried into the organization from new applicants and the ranks of the Painting Patron Members. There is a category for out of state artist members, enabling the group the benefit of having the work of some of America's best traditional painters. There is also a large membership of Patron Members and also a Collector's Circle, which requires a donation to the organization.

== Exhibitions ==
- Altadena Town & Country Club
- Annual Gold Medal Exhibitions (1911–present)
- CAC Gallery at the Old Mill, San Marino, CA (1999–present)
- Frederick R. Weisman Museum of Art, Pepperdine University, Malibu (2000, 2003, 2006, 2009, 2012, 2015)
- Marston's Restaurant, Pasadena (2005–present)

=== Selected past exhibition venues ===
- Autry Museum of the American West (2012, 2014, 2016-2017)
- Bakersfield Museum of Art (2011)
- Barker Brothers, Los Angeles (1946)
- Barnsdall Park (1927–1942)
- Bloomingdale's, New York City (1944)
- Bullock's, Los Angeles (1944)
- The Historic Blinn House, Pasadena (2001–2011)
- The Bowers Museum of Cultural Art (1997–2003)
- CAC Gallery, 1309 Westwood Blvd, Los Angeles (1974)
- CAC Gallery, 1027 West Seventh St, Los Angeles (1922)
- CAC Gallery, No. 424 Copp Building, Los Angeles (1914)
- Cathedral of Our Lady of the Angels (2014, 2010)
- Carnegie Museum of Art, Oxnard (2014)
- The Ebell of Los Angeles (various 1950s-1970s)
- Judson Gallery and Studios, Los Angeles (1997)
- Greek Theater, Los Angeles (1949–1966)
- Long Beach Museum of Art (2010)
- Muckenthaler Cultural Center, Fullerton (1998)
- Mission San Juan Capistrano (1995–2003)
- Museum of History, Science, and Art, Exposition Park, Los Angeles (Annual Gold Medal Exhibitions, 1914-1938)
- Occidental College (1946)
- Oceanside Art Museum (2011)
- Olaf Wieghorst Museum (2014, 2015)
- Pasadena Museum of California Art (Annual Gold Medal Exhibitions, 2003-2011)
- Pasadena Museum of History (2000–2002)
- Phippen Museum, Prescott, AZ (2000)
- San Diego Museum of Fine Arts (1920)
- San Luis Obispo Museum of Art (2011)
- Santa Paula Art Museum (2014)

== Members ==
- Mabel Alvarez,
- Aline Barnsdall,
- Franz Bischoff,
- Sergei Bongart,
- Maurice Braun,
- Carl Oscar Borg,
- Benjamin Chambers Brown,
- Nelbert Chouinard,
- Sir Winston Churchill,
- Alson Skinner Clark,
- Dean Cornwell,
- Frank Cuprien,
- Nicolai Fechin,
- Victor Forsythe,
- Will Foster,
- Ferdinand Lungren (1857–1932),
- Robert Merrell Gage,
- Sam Hyde Harris (1889–1977),
- Anna Althea Hills,
- Frank Tenney Johnson,
- Paul Lauritz,
- Kathryn Leighton,
- Theodore Lukits,
- Jean Mannheim,
- Richard Emil Miller,
- Richard Neutra,
- Stanton Macdonald-Wright,
- Alfredo Ramos Martinez,
- Walter Farrington Moses,
- Winifred Koch Park (1917–2007),
- Edgar Alwin Payne,
- Elsie Palmer Payne (1884–1971),
- Fritz Poock,
- Hovsep Pushman,
- Hanson Puthuff,
- John Hubbard Rich,
- William Frederic Ritschel,
- Guy Rose,
- Carl Rungius,
- Herbert Ryman,
- Donna Norine Schuster,
- Joseph Henry Sharp,
- Millard Sheets,
- Jack Wilkinson Smith,
- George Gardner Symons,
- Julia Bracken Wendt,
- William Wendt,
- Grace Vollmer.

=== Notable current members ===
- Peter Seitz Adams (born 1950)
- Armand Cabrera (born 1955)
- Karl Dempwolf (born 1939)
- Tony Pro (born 1973)
- Tim Solliday (born 1952)

== See also ==
- Landscape art
- California Tonalism
- Decorative Impressionism
