= Franz Bischoff =

American painter (1864–1929)

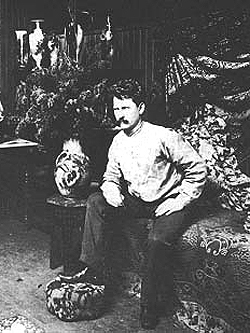
Franz Bischoff in his studio (c.1900)

Franz Albert Bischoff (January 14, 1864 – February 5, 1929) was an American artist known primarily for his China painting, floral paintings and California landscapes. He was born in Steinschönau, Austria (now known as Kamenický Šenov, Czech Republic). He immigrated to the United States as a teenager where he became a naturalized citizen. While in Europe, his early training was focused upon applied design, watercolor and ceramic decorations.

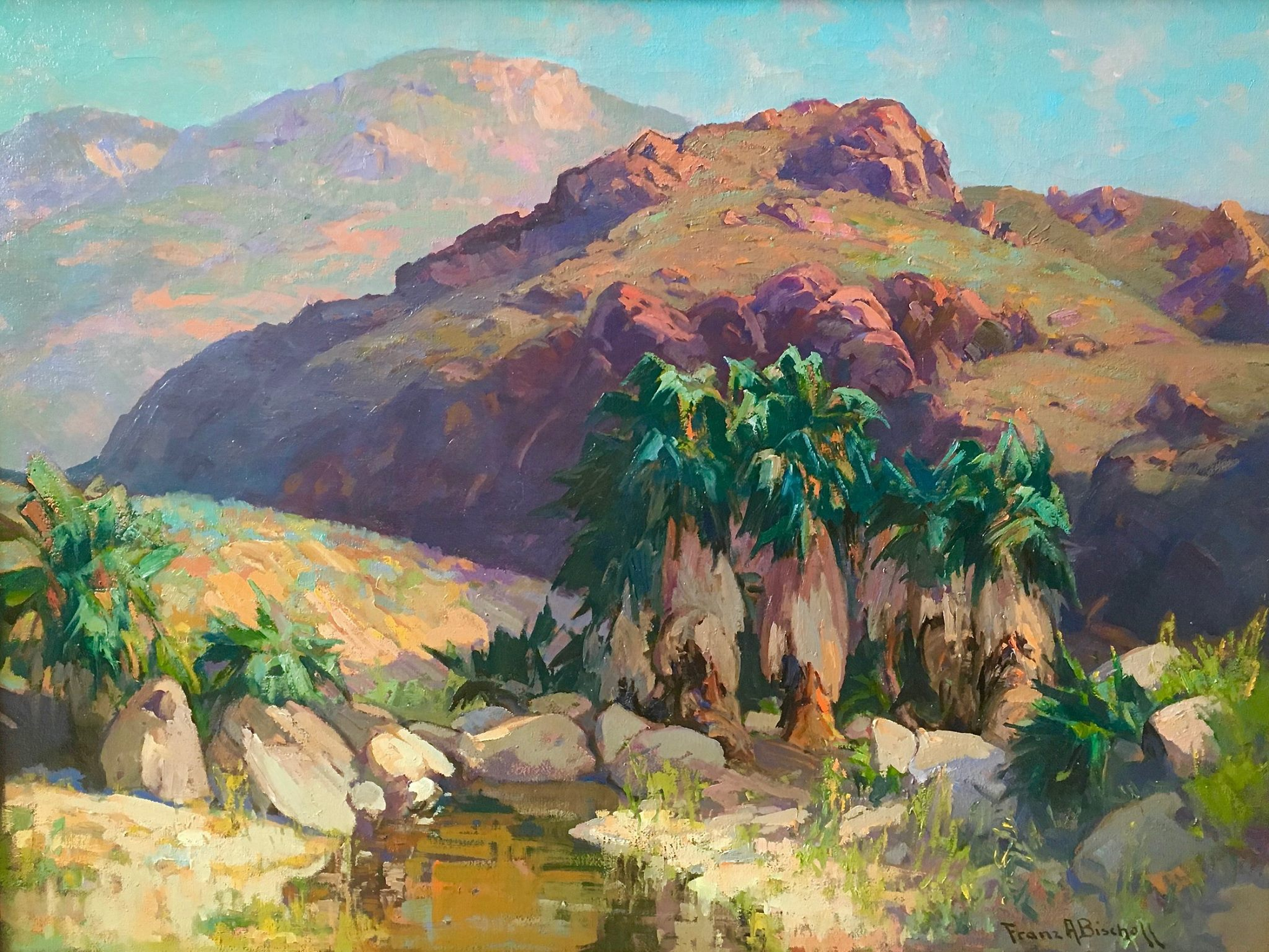
Palm Canyon, 1922 (Steven Stern Collection)

== California years ==
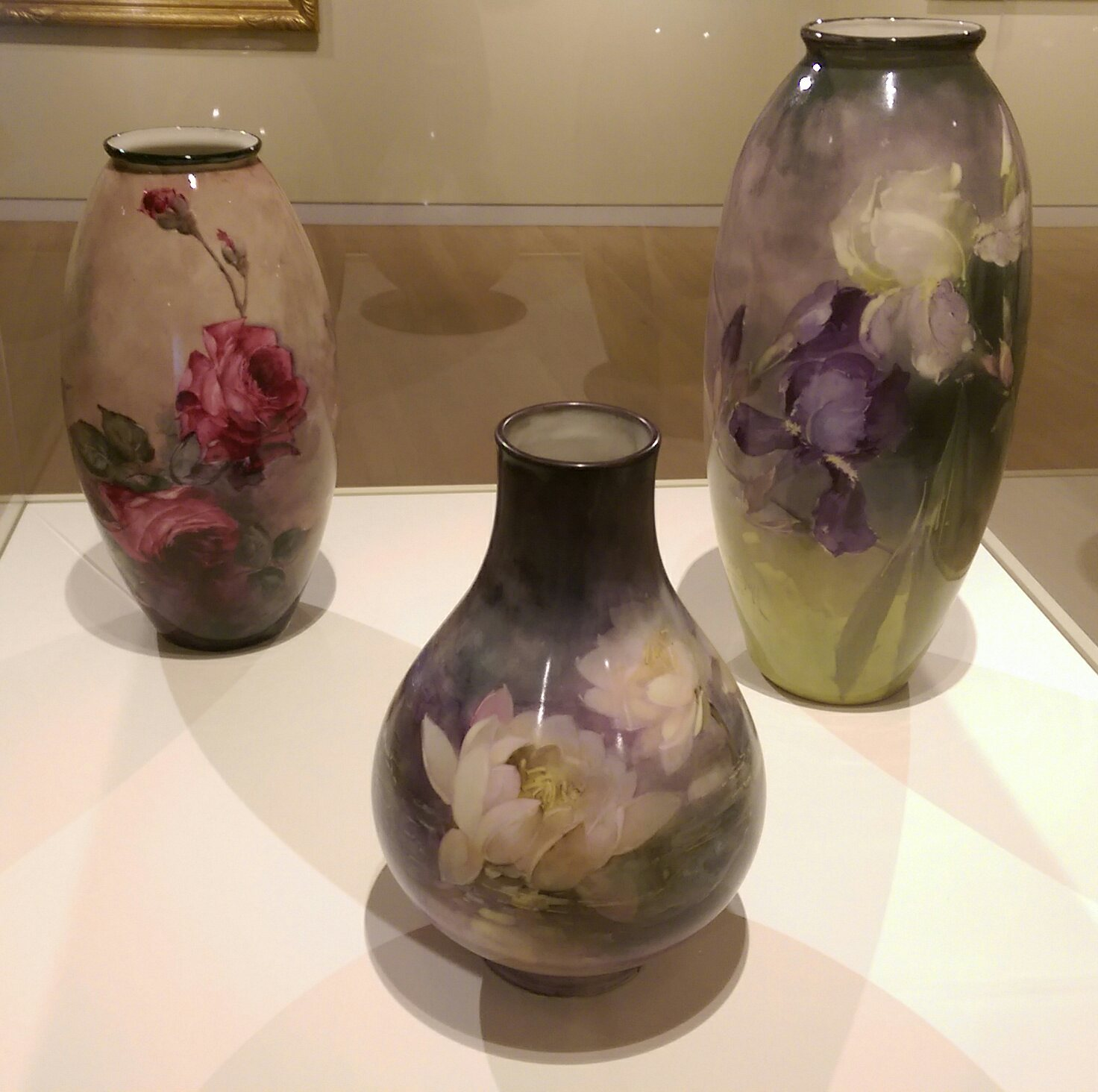
Vases by Franz Bischoff dated 1901, 1903 and 1908, on display at the Crocker Art Museum

After arriving in the United States, Bischoff worked in New York, Fostoria, Ohio, Detroit, Michigan, and Dearborn, Michigan. While in Detroit and Dearborn, he gained success as a porcelain painter, and as a teacher of the techniques, as well as a manufacturer of ceramic glazes as well as a teacher of watercolor painting.

Franz Bischoff decided to visit California in 1900 and ultimately chose to settle in the Los Angeles area in 1906. Shortly after arriving, he started making arrangements to design and build a large Italian Renaissance style home in Pasadena that also became his studio. This landmark home was completed in 1908.

Bischoff was one of the earliest members of the California Art Club, and the group's second meeting was held at his studio on February 5, 1910. Also present at that meeting were Carl Oscar Borg and William Wendt.

Inspired by the California countryside, Bischoff attempted to capture the area's brilliant light and diverse landscapes. Spending less time with ceramic painting following the start of World War I, Bischoff took up canvas painting. He painted local farms, fishing wharfs, coastal landscapes and scenes of the Sierra Nevada and the mountains of Utah, including Zion National Park. Recognized during his career for use of color and vivid composition, his paintings always displayed reverence for nature. One critic commented that some of his later works flirted with Expressionism and his use of colors were reminiscent of Fauvism. Franz Bischoff died of heart failure at home in his adopted city of South Pasadena, California, on February 5, 1929.

== Selected paintings ==
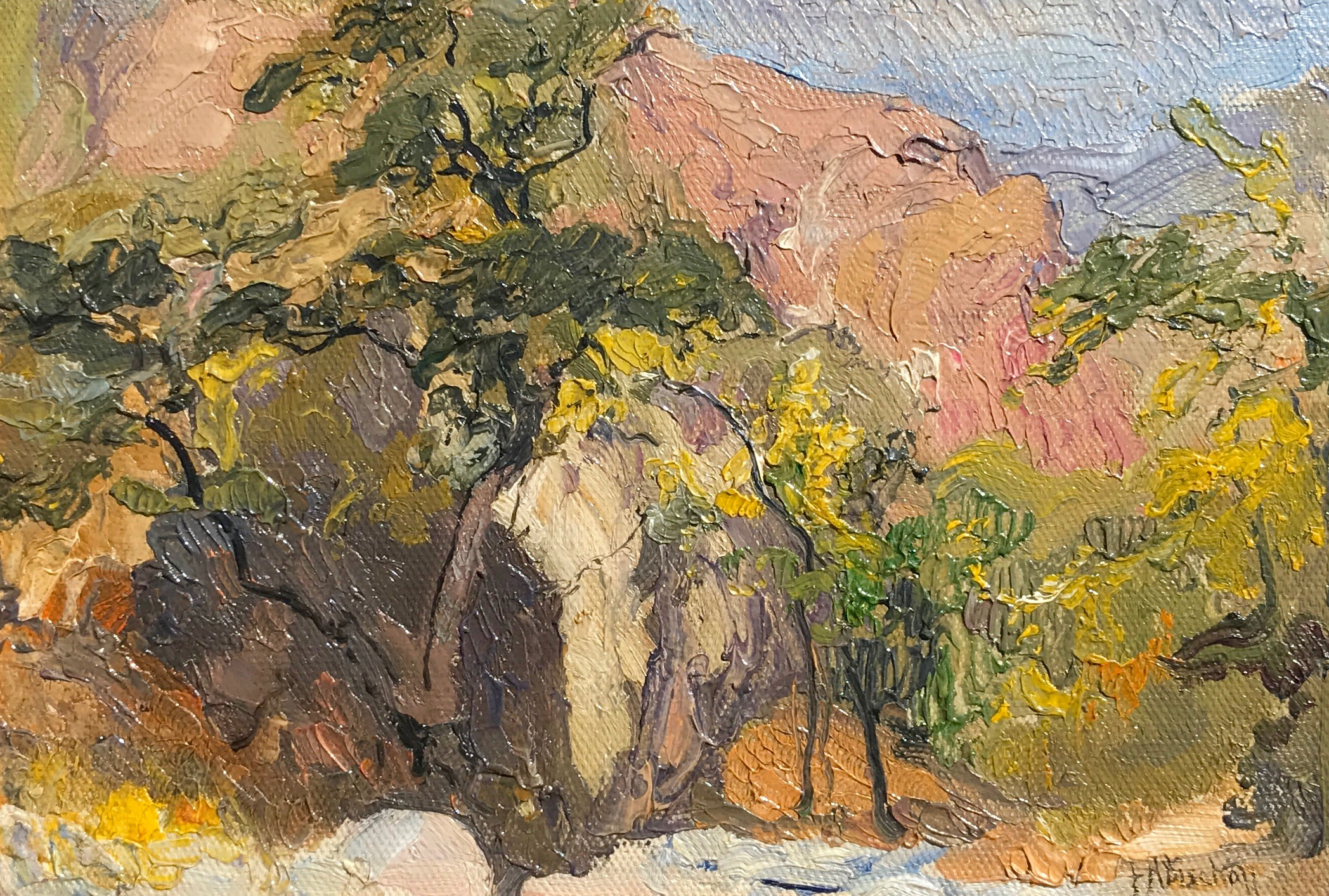
Franz Bischoff "Arroyo Seco, Pasadena"

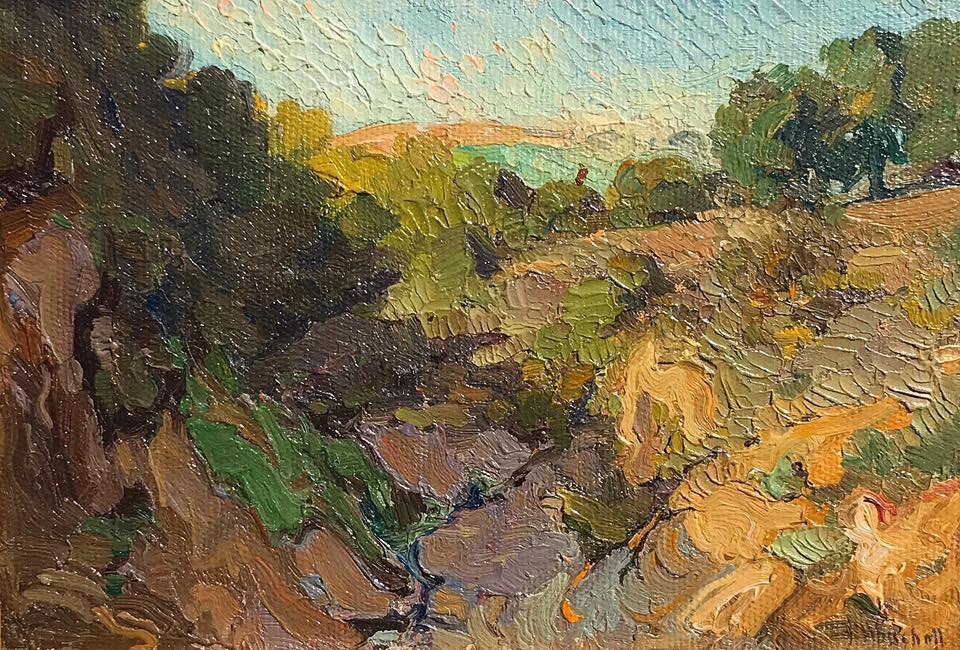
Franz Bischoff "Glimpse of the Sea

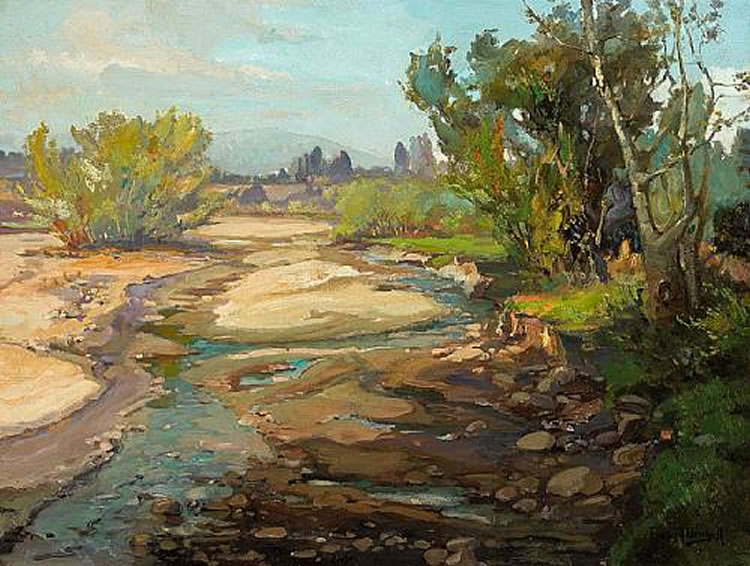
Franz Bischoff "Arroyo Seco" 18" x 24" Steven Stern Collection

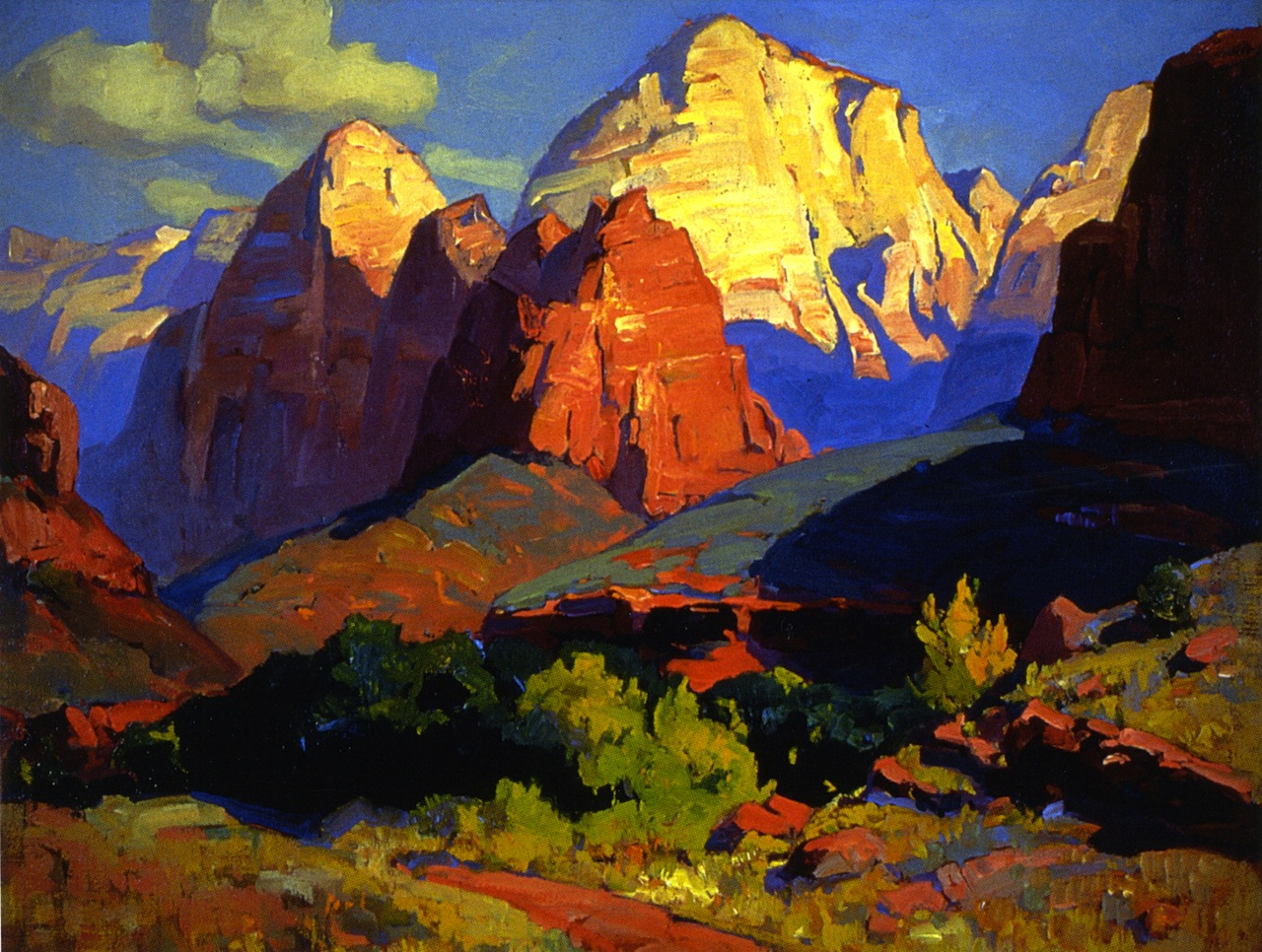
Zion National Park

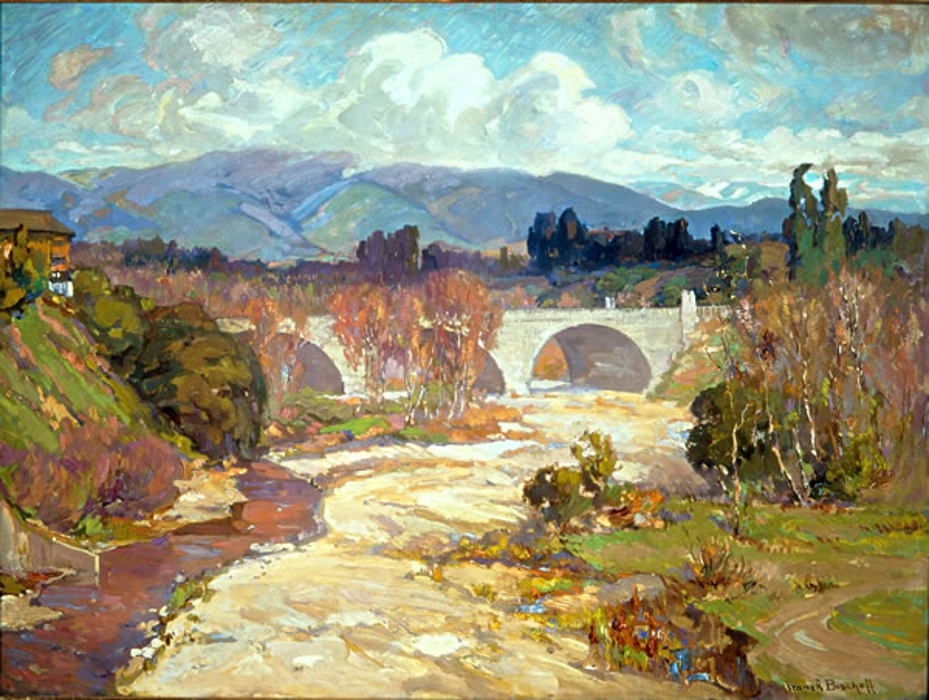
Arroyo Seco Bridge

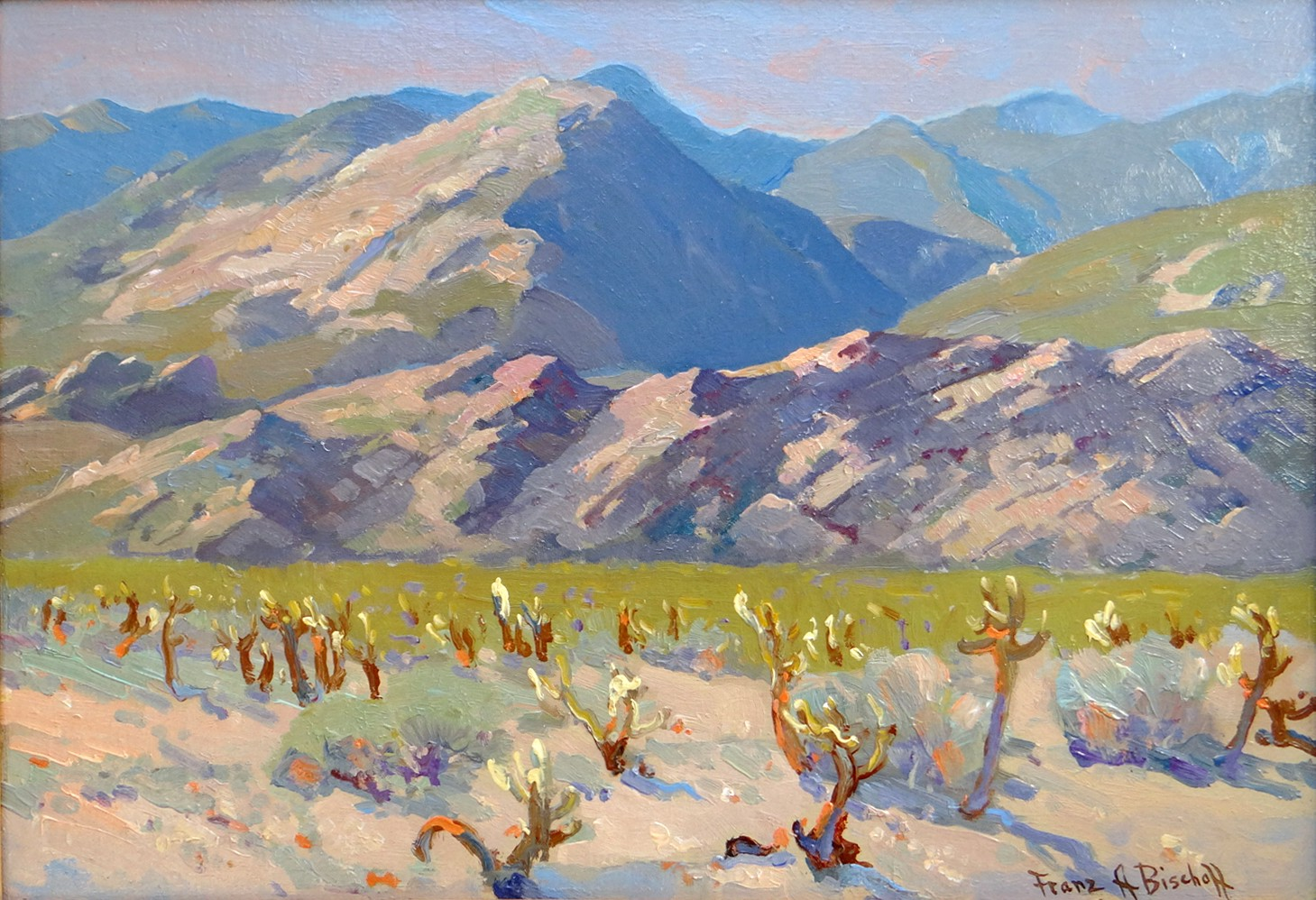
Cholla near Palm Springs

== Awards ==
- Huntington Prize, California Art Club, 1924

== Exhibitions ==
- Nov. 21,2010 - Mar 20, 2011: Gardens and Grandeur: Porcelains and Paintings by Franz A. Bischoff, Pasadena Museum of California Art

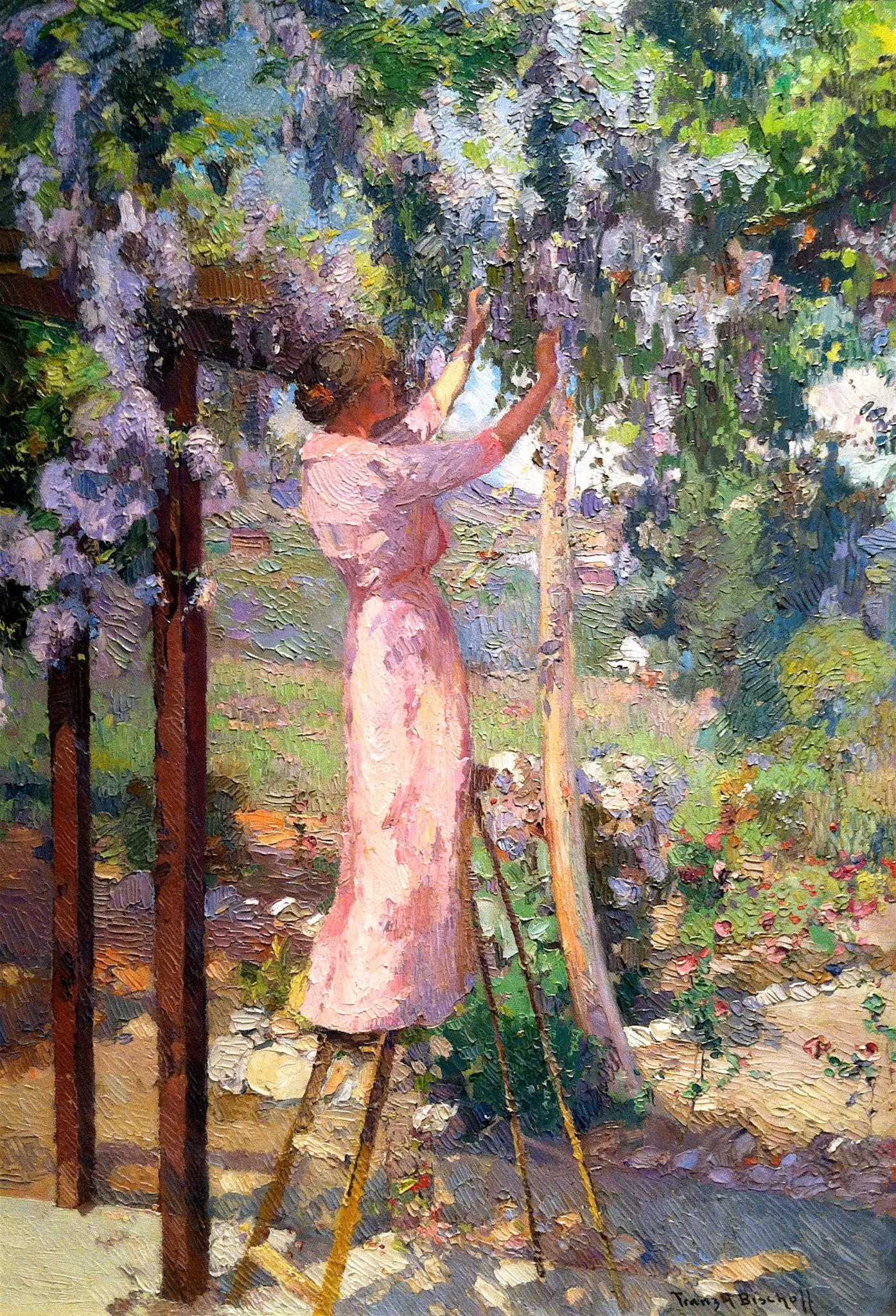
Mrs. Bischoff "Wisteria", c. 1916-1920 (Steven Stern Collection)

== Galleries & public collections ==
- Franz Bischoff Gallery of Art
- Laguna Beach Museum of Art, Laguna Beach, California
- Irvine Museum, Irvine, California
- Gardena High School, Gardena, California
- The Oakland Museum, California
- Crocker Art Museum, Sacramento, California
- William A. Karges Fine Art
