= Contemporary-Traditional Art =

Art produced in style associated with an earlier era

Contemporary-Traditional Art refers to an art produced at the present period of time that reflects the current culture by utilizing classical techniques in drawing, painting, and sculpting. Practicing artists are mainly concerned with the preservation of time-honored skills in creating works of figurative and representational forms of fine art as a means to express human emotions and experiences. Subjects are based on the aesthetics of balancing external reality with the intuitive, internal conscience driven by emotion, philosophical thought, or the spirit. The term is used broadly to encompass all styles and practices of representational art, such as Classicism, Impressionism, Realism, and Plein Air (En plein air) painting. Technical skills are founded in the teachings of the Renaissance, Academic Art, and American Impressionism.

== Organizations ==
Organized groups of practicing artists and institutions dedicated to furthering classical techniques include the Grand Central Atelier, Art Renewal Center, California Art Club, Florence Academy of Art, the Imperial Academy of Arts in St. Petersburg, Russia, Laguna College of Art and Design, Los Angeles Academy of Figurative Art, New York Academy of Art, and Portrait Society of America.

== Publications ==
Publications referencing the term, Contemporary-Traditional or living artists working in traditional styles:

- Empathy For Beauty, Carnegie Art Museum, essay by museum director Suzanne Bellah, 2014
- California Light, A Century of Landscapes - Paintings of the California Art Club by Jean Stern and Molly Siple, foreword by Elaine Adams, 2011
- Land of Sunlight; Contemporary Paintings of San Diego County (2007) by James Lightner
- On Location in Malibu (1999, 2003, 2006, 2009, 2012, 2015) Frederick R. Weisman Museum of Art, curated by museum director Michael Zakian, PhD. Essay, Painting in Malibu, 1999
- Selections From the Permanent Collection, Southern Alleghenies Museum of Art, essay by Michael Tomar, PhD., 1996

== Notable artists ==
Peter Seitz Adams (b. 1950)

Ned Bittinger (b. 1951)

Jacob Collins (b. 1964)

Karl Dempwolf (b. 1939)

Frederick Hart (1943-1999, Sculptor)

Everett Raymond Kinstler (b. 1926)

Jeremy Lipking (b. 1974)

Richard Schmid (b. 1934)

Nelson Shanks (1937-2015)

Tim Solliday (b. 1952)

Alexey Steele (b. 1967)

Patricia Watwood (b. 1971)

Bruce Wolfe (b. 1941, Sculptor)
