= Dempwolf =

Dempwolf is a surname. Notable people with the surname include:

- Gertrud Dempwolf (born 1936), German politician
- John A. Dempwolf (1848–1926), American architect
- Karl Dempwolf (born 1939), German-born American painter
