= Armand Cabrera =

American painter

Armand Cabrera (born June 5, 1955, in San Francisco, California) is an American oil painter recognized for his en plein air landscape art, seascapes, cityscapes, still lifes and figurative works. He is also well known as a game art designer who has delivered over 25 shipped games as a Lead and Senior Artist. His clients include Lucasfilm Games, Disney, Electronic Arts, Virgin Entertainment, Nickelodeon, Microsoft and Paramount Pictures.

Cabrera is represented by seven fine art galleries in the United States. He is the "Artist in Residence" at Riverbend Park in Great Falls, Virginia and is a member of the "Artist in Residence Program" at Century House on Nantucket Island, Massachusetts.

== Art competitions and museum exhibitions ==
Cabrera's National Art Competitions include the Laguna Plein Air Competition, Sonoma Plein Air, Plein Air Easton, Rocky Mountain Plein Air, California Art Club Gold Medal Exhibition, Carmel Art Festival, Napa Valley Museum and International Museum of Contemporary Masters "Salon International". Museum shows include the St. George Art Museum in Utah, the Pasadena Museum of History in Southern California, the Human History Museum in Utah, the Laguna Art Museum in California, the Pasadena Museum of California Art in California and the Napa Valley Museum in Northern California.

== "Art In Embassies" program ==
Cabrera is a participating artist in the Art In Embassies program of the U.S. Department of State. He has loaned two Western American paintings to the U.S. Embassy in Sana'a, Yemen.

== Periodicals and book ==
International Artist magazine published a 10-page article in 2008 featuring Cabrera's work and a painting demonstration. American Art Collector featured Cabrera's "Paintings of the Piedmont", a One Man Exhibition in a 4-page article in November 2009. Cabrera's landscape paintings have been featured in the 2009 book Southern California Story: Seeking The Better Life In Sierra Madre by Michele Zack and A Century of Sanctuary: The Art of Zion National Park by Peter H. Hassrick. A Cabrera "How To Demo" was featured in the instructional book, How Did You Paint That?: 100 Ways to Paint Seascapes, Rivers & Lakes.

== See also ==
Star Wars: X-Wing (video game series)#Developers
