= Sam Hyde Harris =

American painter (1889–1977)

- Born: February 9, 1889; Brentford, Middlesex, England.
- Died: May 30, 1977 (aged 88)
- Movement: California Impressionism

Samuel Hyde Harris (9 February 1889 – 30 May 1977) was an American painter known for impressionist paintings of California in the 20th century as well as a successful career as a commercial artist. He was a member of the California Art Club.

== Early life ==
Sam Hyde Harris was born in Brentford, Middlesex, England, on February 9, 1889. His parents were David Remnant Harris and Eliza Hyde Harris. His mother died when he was only three years old, leaving his father to care for seven children. He began working as an artist at a very young age. His family emigrated to the United States in November 1903, where they settled in Los Angeles.

He continued working as an artist and sign painter in the Los Angeles area. He enrolled in classes at the Art Students' League of Los Angeles and the Cannon Art School. He studied with Stanton Macdonald-Wright, Frank Tolles Chamberlain, Lawrence Murphy, and Will Foster. During the 1920s, while working as a professional artist, he studied under Hanson Puthuff, and painted with Puthuff, Edgar Payne, and Jean Mannheim.

== Commercial career ==
Throughout his life Sam Hyde Harris produced a large body of commercial work varying in scope from cards for individual store windows to posters produced for national advertising campaigns. Harris is particularly remembered for his posters produced for various rail lines and travel destinations. He worked for the Santa Fe, Union Pacific, and Southern Pacific Railroads. Harris also created the windmill logo for Van de Kamp's Holland Dutch Bakeries. Harris also created posters for Gilmore Gasoline, Eastside Genuine Bock Beer, Caterpillar, Old Colony Paint, Richfield Oil Corporation, Calirox Fruit Cookies, and Mission Pak Company.

A posthumous 2021 exhibit at Casa Romantica highlighted Harris career as a commercial artist.

== Teaching career ==
During the Great Depression, Harris began teaching part time, and continued teaching for the rest of his life. He taught at Chouinard Art Institute, Ebell Club of Los Angeles, the Spectrum Club of Long Beach, the Friday Morning Club of Los Angeles, the Glendale Tuesday Afternoon Club, and the Businessmen's Art Institute of Los Angeles.

== Easel Painting ==
Harris painted non-commercial works throughout his life. His favorite subjects were scenes from his area in southern California, including a series of paintings of Chavez Ravine before it was developed, and paintings of the early Los Angeles industrial landscape.

Harris exhibited with the California Art Club, Painters and Sculptors of Southern California, Laguna Beach Art Association, Little Gallery, Probst-Taylor Decorating Company, Pacific Advertising Club Association, Biltmore Salon, San Gabriel Artists' Guild, Hollywood Reviera Beach Club, The Artists Guild of California, South Pasadena Public Library, The Society for Sanity in Art, Armand Duvannes Gallery, and Los Angeles County Museum.

Harris won awards from the California Art Club, Laguna Beach Art Association, Los Angeles Art League, Painters and Sculptors Club, Artists of the Southwest, Valley Art Association, and the San Gabriel Festival of Arts.

== Legacy ==
Harris' papers from 1928 to 1980 are held in the archives of the Smithsonian Institution Archives of American Art.

== Collections ==
Harris' work is held in the permanent collection of decorative arts and design of the Los Angeles County Museum of Art.
