= Karl Dempwolf =

German-American painter (1939–2026)

- Born: 17 December 1939; Delmenhorst, Gau Weser-Ems, Germany
- Died: 26 February 2026 (aged 86); Sherman Oaks, California, U.S.
- Education: California State University, Northridge, Art Center College of Design, University of Southern California
- Known for: Landscape painting
- Movement: California Plein Air, California Impressionism

Karl Dempwolf (17 December 1939 – 26 February 2026) was a Dutch-American contemporary California Plein-Air painter who was known for his California Landscapes. He was a Signature Member of the California Art Club (f. 1909), and served in its Advisory Board of Directors.

== Early life and training ==
Karl Dempwolf was born in Delmenhorst, Germany on 17 December 1939. As a child, he spent the war years in Bavaria, where he developed his love for nature. In 1954, at the age of fourteen, he and his family immigrated to the United States aboard the S.S. America, at the request of the Lockheed Corporation, where his father was to serve as an aerospace engineer. Dempwolf attended Van Nuys High where he played basketball, then continued his education at California State University, Northridge where he studied art and photography, and became the school's very first All-American athlete. His training includes the Art Center College of Design (1969) and studies with Hans Burkhardt. He also had a master's degree in Fine Arts from the University of Southern California (1974).

== Early career ==
In the mid 1970s, with an interest and a background in art and photography, Dempwolf enjoyed a first career as an award-winning producer and director of documentaries. During this period he filmed a story that touched many viewers, recording the life of Dominic Calicchio, a craftsman who made prized trumpets by hand working out of his Hollywood home. During World War II, when brass was in short supply, he made his own metal alloy, and continued his trade in peacetime. Dempwolf filmed him every weekend for two years and the resulting film took many awards. The Council on International Non-Theatrical Events awarded him their Golden Eagle and he took Best in Show at the Bellevue International Film Festival in Washington.

== Painting career ==
With time, however, painting emerged as Karl Dempwolf's true passion: Early California artists such as William Wendt (1865–1946), Guy Rose (1867–1925), Charles Reiffel (1862–1942), William Ritschel (1864–1949), Edgar Payne (1883–1947) and others, as well as American Impressionist Childe Hassam (1859–1935), became his artistic icons. Additionally, the American Arts & Crafts Movement has been an inspiration for Dempwolf. The movement professed the idea that Art has the power to give the viewer a much needed spiritual lift. Jean Stern, Executive Director of the Irvine Museum in Irvine, California, writes: "…Karl’s paintings are richer with the lessons of Modernism. His forceful use of line gives his paintings great strength and intense formal qualities, and his luxurious use of color imparts a profound yet impassioned consciousness."

== Death ==
Dempwolf died on 26 February 2026, at the age of 86.

== Exhibitions ==
- 2014 – 103rd Annual California Art Club Gold Medal Juried Exhibition, Autry National Center of the American West
- 2014 – "Empathy for Beauty in the 21st Century," Carnegie Art Museum
- 2014 – "Legendary Landmarks of California," CAC Gallery at The Old Mill, San Marino, California
- 2014 – "The Missions of California: celebrating Father Serra’s 300th Birthday," Cathedral of Our Lady of the Angels, Los Angeles
- 2013 – 102nd Annual California Art Club Gold Medal Juried Exhibition, USC Fisher Museum of Art
- 2013 – "Then and Now: One Hundred Years of California Impressionism," The Palos Verdes Art Center
- 2013 – "Along El Camino Real: Missions of California," CAC Gallery at The Old Mill, San Marino, California
- 2012 – 101st Annual California Art Club Gold Medal Juried Exhibition, Autry National Center
- 2012 – "Saving Paradise: The Symbiosis of Landscape Painting and Environmental Awareness," The Bennington Center for the Arts, Vermont
- 2012 – "Saving Paradise," Los Angeles Municipal Art Gallery
- 2012 – "Catalina: The Wild Side," Catalina Island Conservancy
- 2012 – "On Location in Malibu," Frederick R. Weisman Museum, Pepperdine University, Malibu
- 2012 – "Monumental Miniatures III," CAC Gallery at The Old Mill, San Marino, California
- 2011 – 100th Annual California Art Club Gold Medal Juried Exhibition, Pasadena Museum of California Art
- 2011 – "Splendor: Paintings of the Tejon Ranch," Bakersfield Museum of Art
- 2011 – "Gold Coast: Paintings of Southern California," Oceanside Art Museum
- 2011 – "A Luminous Land," Carnegie Art Museum, Oxnard, California
- 2011 – "Gems from the Central Coast," San Luis Obispo Museum of Art
- 2011 – "California Dreamin'," CAC Gallery at The Old Mill, San Marino, California
- 2011 – "Capturing California's Preserved Lands and Historic Districts," CAC Gallery at The Old Mill, San Marino, California
- 2010 - 99th Annual California Art Club Gold Medal Juried Exhibition, Pasadena Museum of California Art
- 2010 – "Capturing California’s Preserved Lands: Gems from the Central Coast," CAC Gallery at The Old Mill, San Marino, California
- 2010 – "Historic Landmarks and Districts of Southern California," CAC Gallery at The Old Mill, San Marino, California
- 2010 – "Visions of the San Gabriels," CAC Gallery at The Old Mill, San Marino, California
- 2009 - 98th Annual California Art Club Juried Exhibition, Pasadena Museum of California Art
- 2009 – "California's Landscapes and Legacy," The Bennington Center for the Arts, Vermont
- 2009 – "On Location in Malibu," Frederick R. Weisman Museum, Pepperdine University, Malibu
- 2009 - "California Art Club: Artists Explore Los Angeles," Los Angeles Area Chamber of Commerce
- 2009 – "Paintings from the Southern Sierra Foothills," CAC Gallery at The Old Mill, San Marino, California
- 2008 - 97th Annual California Art Club Gold Medal Juried Exhibition, Pasadena Museum of California Art
- 2007 - 96th Annual California Art Club Gold Medal Juried Exhibition, Pasadena Museum of California Art
- 2007 – "Exhibition of California Landscape Paintings," Historic George H. Maxwell House, Pasadena
- 2006 - 95th Annual California Art Club Gold Medal Juried Exhibition, Pasadena Museum of California Art
- 2006 – "On Location in Malibu," Frederick R. Weisman Museum of Art, Pepperdine University, Malibu
- 2005 – "Monumental Miniatures 2," CAC Gallery at The Old Mill, San Marino California
- 2004 – 94th Annual California Art Club Gold Medal Juried Exhibition, Pasadena Museum of California Art
- 2004 – "Expressions of Winter," CAC Gallery at The Old Mill, San Marino, California
- 2003 - 93rd Annual California Art Club Gold Medal Juried Exhibition, Pasadena Museum of California Art
- 2003 – "Sights of Southern California," Bowers Museum of Cultural Art
- 2003 – "9th Annual California Art Club Plein Air Painting," Mission San Juan Capistrano
- 2002 – 92nd Annual California Art Club Gold Medal Juried Exhibition, Pasadena Museum of History
- 2002 – "Salon D’Automne: The Third Annual California Autumn Salon," Edenhurst Gallery and Morseburg Galleries
- 2002 – "8th Annual California Art Club Plein Air Painting," Mission San Juan Capistrano
- 2001 – 91st Annual California Art Club Gold Medal Juried Exhibition, Pasadena Historical Museum
- 2001 – "7th Annual California Art Club Plein Air Painting," Mission San Juan Capistrano
- 2001 – "Sights and Sounds of Santa Ana," Bowers Museum of Cultural Art
- 2001 – "Gardens of the Huntington, II," CAC Gallery at The Old Mill, San Marino, California
- 2001 – "Contemporary Views of L.A.'s Historic Chinatown," CAC Gallery at The Old Mill, San Marino, California
- 2000 – 90th Annual California Art Club Gold Medal Juried Exhibition, Pasadena Historical Museum
- 2000 – "On Location in Malibu," Phippen Museum, Prescott, Arizona
- 1999 – "On Location in Malibu," Frederick R. Weisman Museum of Art, Pepperdine University, Malibu
- 1999 – "Sights of Santa Ana: Scenes of Orange County," Bowers Museum of Cultural Art
- 1998 – "Treasures of the Sierra Nevada," Natural History Museum of Los Angeles
- 1998 - "Treasures of the Sierra Nevada," Muckenthaler Cultural Center, Fullerton, California
- 1997 – "Sights and Sounds of Santa Ana," Bowers Museum of Cultural Art
- 1996 – "California Wetlands: Paintings of California’s Endangered and Protected Wetlands," Natural History Museum of Los Angeles County
- 1996 – "Puertas del Santuario: Paintings of the Mission San Juan Capistrano," Carnegie Art Museum, Oxnard
- 1995 – "Modern Masters of Landscape Paintings," California Heritage Art Gallery, San Francisco

== Permanent Public Collections ==
- Collection of Chancellor Angela Merkel of Germany, presented as a diplomatic gift by Barack Obama
- Arts for the Parks, Permanent Collection
- McGraw Hill Publishers, Permanent Collection

== Awards ==
Karl Dempwolf's work has received wide recognition including the Lifetime Achievement Award granted byEric Rhoads' Streamline Publishing, producers of Plein Air and Fine Arts Connosieur magazines, at the Plein Air Convention held in San Diego in 2017.

== See also ==
- California Art Club
- California Plein-Air Painting
- En plein air
- Landscape art
- California Impressionism

== Books and Magazine References ==
- Stern, Jean and Siple, Molly. "California Light, A Century of Landscapes," Skira Rizzoli, A Division of Rizzoli International Publications, Inc., 2011
- Sherman Pearl, Melissa, "Destination Art," California Homes Magazine, April 2006
- American Art Collector Magazine, January 2006
- Sherman Pearl, Melissa, "Karl Dempwolf Expresses His Passion for the Masters," California Homes Magazine, March 2003
- Orange County Magazine, Annual Edition, Front Cover, 2003
- Metzger, Phillip W., Author, Rubin Wolf, Rachel, Editor, "Art from the Parks," North Light Books, September 1, 2000

== Catalogs ==
- California Art Club: 103rd Annual Gold Medal Juried Exhibition, 2014 (CAC Exhibition Catalog), Artist Entry and illustration
- "Empathy for Beauty in the 21st Century," Carnegie Art Museum, 2014
- California Art Club 102nd Annual Gold Medal Juried Exhibition, 2013 (CAC Exhibition Catalog), Artist Entry and illustration
- "Then and Now: One Hundred Years if California Impressionism," Palos Verdes Art center, 2013
- California Art Club 101st Annual Gold Medal Juried Exhibition, 2012 (CAC Exhibition Catalog), Artist Entry and illustration
- "Saving Paradise: The Symbiosis of Landscape Painting and Environmental Awareness," The Bennington Center for the Arts, Vermont, 2012
- California Art Club 100th Annual Gold Medal Juried Exhibition, 2011 (CAC Exhibition Catalog), Artist Entry and illustration
- "Splendor: Paintings of the Tejon Ranch," Bakersfield Museum of Art, 2011
- California Art Club 99th Annual Gold Medal Juried Exhibition, 2010 (CAC Exhibition Catalog), Artist Entry and illustration
- California Art Club 98th Annual Gold Medal Juried Exhibition, 2009 (CAC Exhibition Catalog), Artist Entry and illustration
- "On Location in Malibu," Frederick R. Weisman Museum of Art, Pepperdine University, Malibu, 2009
- "California's Landscapes and Legacy," The Bennington Center for the Arts, Vermont, 2009
- California Art Club 97th Annual Gold Medal juried exhibition, 2008 (CAC Exhibition Catalog), Artist Entry and illustration
- California Art Club 96th Annual Gold Medal Juried Exhibition, 2007 (CAC Exhibition Catalog), Artist Entry and illustration
- California Art Club 95th Annual Gold Medal Juried Exhibition, 2006 (CAC Exhibition Catalog), Artist Entry and illustration
- "On Location in Malibu," Frederick R. Weisman Museum of Art, Pepperdine University, Malibu, 2006
- California Art Club 94th Annual Gold Medal Juried Exhibition, 2005 (CAC Exhibition Catalog), Artist Entry and illustration
- California Art Club 93rd Annual Gold Medal Juried Exhibition, 2003 (CAC Exhibition Catalog), Artist Entry and illustration
- "Sights of Southern California," Bowers Museum of Cultural Art, Santa Ana, California, 2003
- California Art Club 92nd Annual Gold Medal Juried Exhibition, 2002 (CAC Exhibition Catalog), Artist Entry and illustration
- California Art Club 91st Annual Gold Medal Juried Exhibition, 2001 (CAC Exhibition Catalog), Artist Entry and illustration
- California Art Club 90th Annual Gold Medal Juried Exhibition, 2000 (CAC Exhibition Catalog), Artist Entry and illustration
- "On Location in Malibu," Phippen Museum, Prescott, Arizona, 2000
- "Treasures of the Sierra Nevada," Natural History Museum of Los Angeles County, Los Angeles, California 1998
- "Arts for the Parks: Artists Celebrating our National Parks," National Park Foundation, 1998
