= Walter Farrington Moses =

American painter

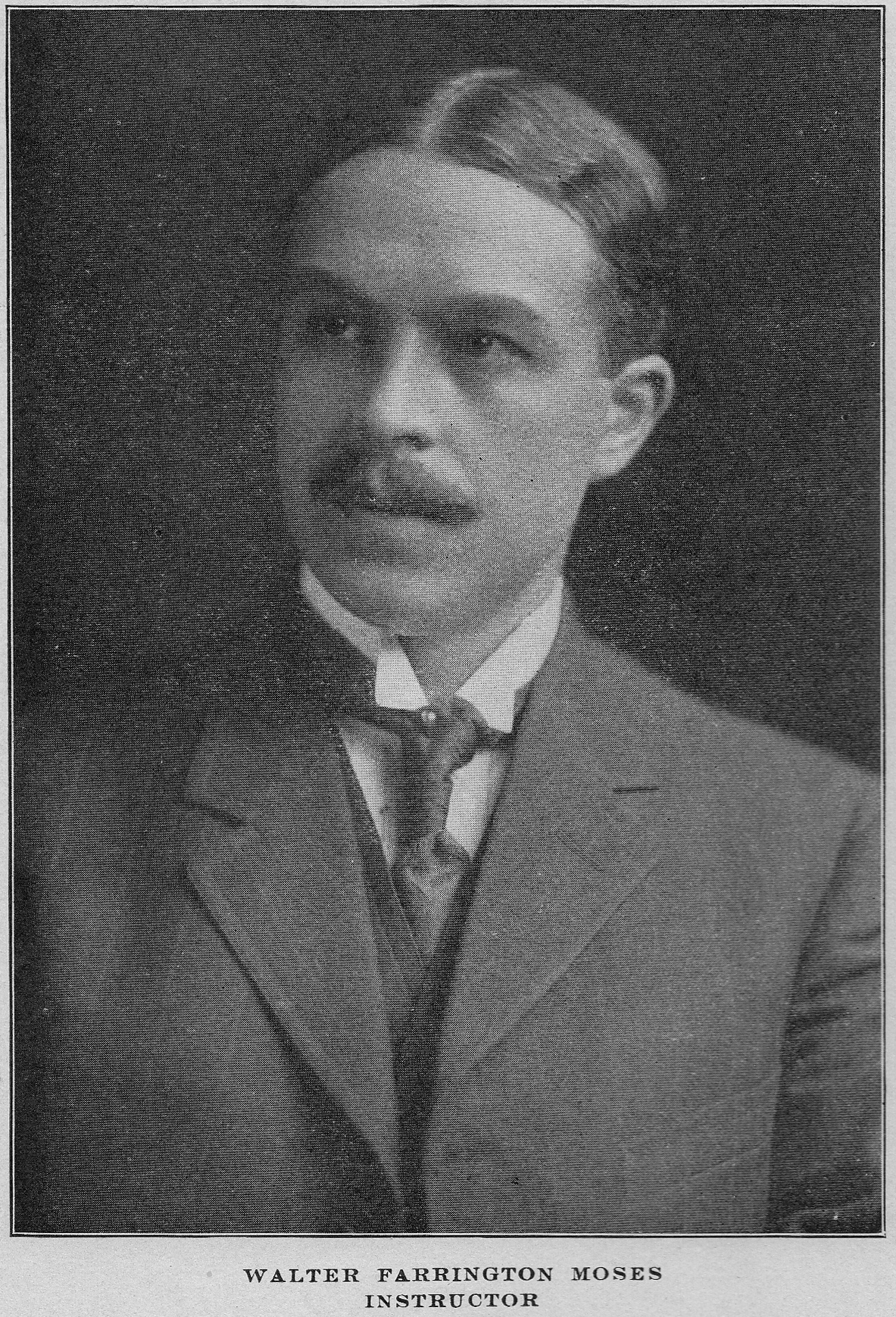
- Born: April 17, 1874; Sterling, Illinois
- Died: October 25, 1947; Los Angeles, California
- Known for: Painter

Walter Farrington Moses (1874-1947) was an American Landscape painter.

After studying at the School of the Art Institute of Chicago, he founded the Art Craft Club of Chicago in 1916 and was art director of Vogue Studios. He was an instructor at the Fashion School of Illustrating in Chicago. He was the author-illustrator of Artistic Anatomy and managing director of the California Art Club in 1922. A prolific plein air painter, his works are infused with light and air and captured the unspoiled beauty of Southern California of the 1920s and 1930s. He settled in Los Angeles in 1922 and founded the Art Guild Academy in 1930 where he taught for many years. He lived in Eagle Rock, California until his death on October 25, 1947. Moses signed his paintings using various variations of his name, including Walter Farrington Moses , Walter Farrington, W. Farrington, Farrington, Moses, Farrington Moses, W.F. Moses and Walton.

== Links ==
- Art Auction
- Art Auction
- Art Auction
