= Paul Lauritz =

Norwegian-born American painter

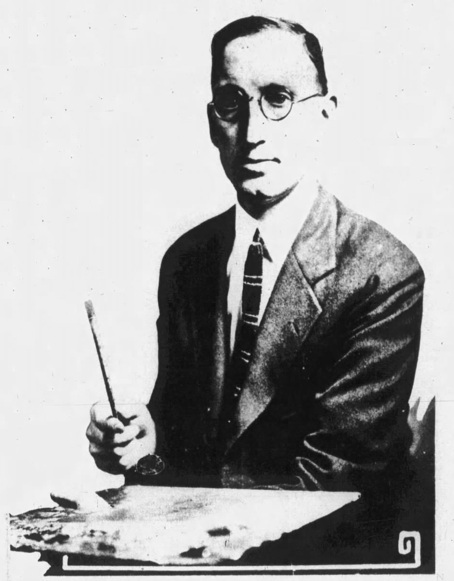
- Circa 1925
- Born: 18 April 1889; Larvik, Norway
- Died: 31 October 1975 (aged 86); Los Angeles, California
- Occupations: Painter, art teacher

Paul Lauritz (18 April 1889 – 31 October 1975) was a Norwegian-born American oil painter and art teacher.

== Biography ==
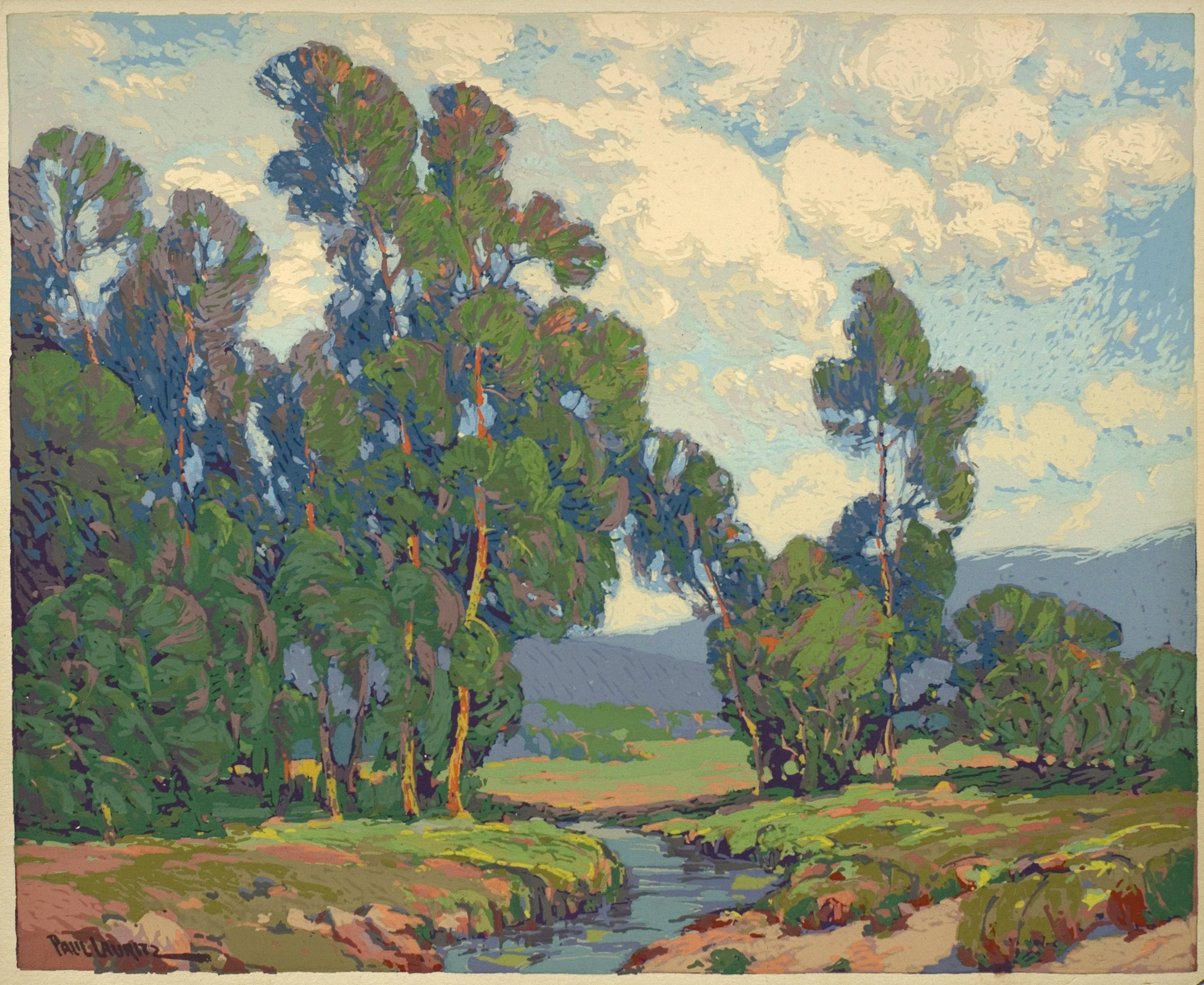
Paul Lauritz. A Song of Spring. Silkscreen. 1924

Paul Lauritz was born at Larvik, Norway, the son of Lauritz Olsen, a day laborer, and Maren Sofie Matisen. His initial art training came at age 14 when he attended a local art academy, spending two years drawing and getting some informal instruction from an English watercolorist. Early art critics reported that he attended art school in Oslo, studying under Frits Thaulow, but this is difficult to reconcile as Thaulow was living in France at the time Lauritz was in school.

He emigrated to eastern Canada at age 16 to live with relatives, working his way west to Nelson, BC, where his older brother Martin had established himself as a successful butcher. Here he tried hard rock mining and hunting, even travelling as far as northern Alberta. He also found time to paint.

Lauritz arrived in Portland, Oregon, in 1907 and worked as a painter in a paint store, eventually forming the Pacific Sign Company with his brother Ludvig. He married Mary Potterton, a Portland bookkeeper, in 1912. He continued his fine art studies, taking lessons from noted local artist Clyde Leon Keller and exhibited a work done at Nelson called "Kootenay Landing" in a show in Portland in 1914. That year Lauritz, Keller, and newly-arrived eastern artist Dana Bartlett became executive board members of the new Mutual Art Association, exhibiting works through 1916. Here Lauritz was exposed to many artists who had trained in eastern schools. Bartlett, himself trained at the Art Students' League, moved to California where he and Lauritz would exhibit together often. Lauritz traveled to San Francisco in 1915 to paint signage for the Panama Pacific Exposition with O. H. Friske.

In March 1916 Lauritz sailed the Inside Passage aboard the SS Admiral Watson from Seattle to Valdez, Alaska, where he camped on the beach for a month, painting. He arrived in Anchorage in April and, deciding to go into business and paint in his spare time, partnered with his sign painter friend O. H. Friske in a paint store. His wife joined him there and within a few months his brother arrived. They bought out Friske, operating as 'Lauritz Brothers' offering paint, wallpaper, and advertising signage. This same year artist Sydney Laurence moved his photography studio from Valdez to Anchorage. By 1917 Lauritz described his occupation as 'painter.' That May he returned to Portland to exhibit his Alaska landscapes with the Palette Club.

While his brother ran the store, Lauritz took hunting and painting trips to places like Matanuska, the Chugach Mountains, Eklutna Lake and the Willow Creek gold district. Again he returned to Oregon to show with the Palette Club and sell his work. Seeing Lauritz's work in Portland prompted the president of the University of Oregon to host a show in Eugene as well.

In the summer of 1919 he returned to Anchorage and continued to paint, showing fourteen canvasses alongside works by Sydney Laurence at the Pioneer Hall in Anchorage, to great reviews, the writer stating: "each one a striking example of the modern school of art." Lauritz described his Alaska experience as: "business wasn't successful, but painting was."

By late 1919 he moved to Los Angeles and opened a studio at the Lyceum Theatre. In December he exhibited in Santa Barbara, alongside Hanson Puthuff, Marion Kavanaugh Wachtel, Edgar Payne and others.

Lauritz had been making his own oil pigments since he was a youth, preferring walnut oil to linseed, as it didn't darken over time. With this experience he, along with his son, eventually developed it into a business under the brand name 'Perma Artist Colors'. Besides painting, he also taught at the Chouinard Art Institute and the Otis Art Institute, and from 1942-43 was the president of the California Art Club.

Paul's brother Ludvig stayed in Anchorage, selling the store in the 1920s. After Paul became successful in California the brothers did attempt to leverage their experiences in Alaska, to mine for gold at Sunrise Creek. In March 1927 Paul and Ludvig became directors in the newly incorporated Sunrise Hydraulicing and Dredging Company, but Ludvig died later that year.

Paul Lauritz exhibited regularly at the Kanst gallery in Los Angeles. In February 1922 the gallery held a show featuring two artists: Paul Lauritz and Charles M. Russell. He also exhibited often at the Cannell Chaffin Gallery and the Stendahl Gallery. His work is in the permanent collections of the Crocker Art Museum, the Los Angeles County Museum of Art, the Monterey Museum of Art, San Diego Museum of Art and Carnegie Art Museum (Oxnard, California).
