= Julia Bracken Wendt =

American sculptor

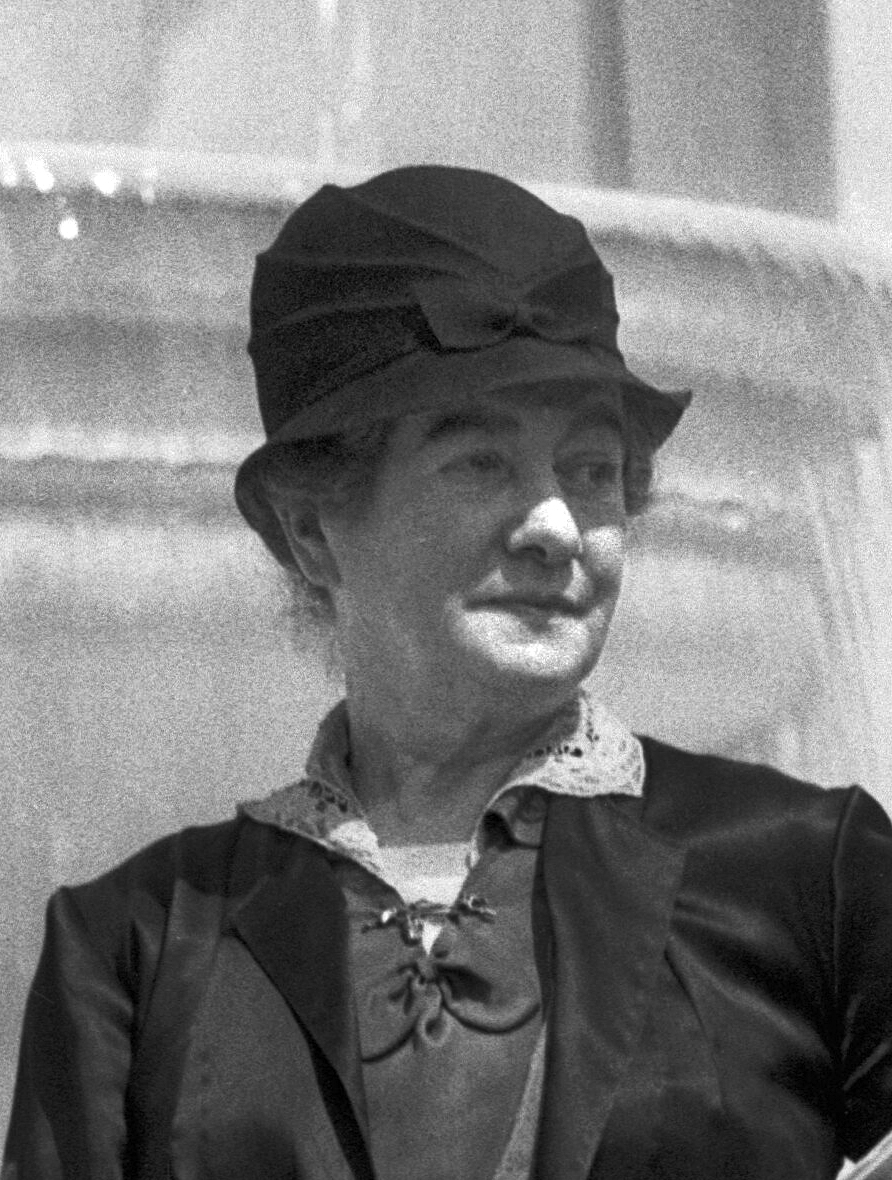
- Wendt in 1933
- Born: Julia Bracken; 1870; Apple River, Illinois, United States
- Died: 1942 (aged 71–72); Laguna Beach, California, United States
- Employer: Otis College of Art and Design
- Known for: Sculpture
- Notable work: Illinois Welcoming the Nations (1893) and The Three Graces: History, Science and Art (1914)
- Spouse: William Wendt (m. 1906)
- Awards: Gold medal for sculpture at the 1915 San Diego Exposition

Julia Bracken Wendt (1870–1942) was a notable American sculptor, born on June 10, 1871, in Apple River, Illinois, the twelfth of thirteen children in an Irish Catholic family.

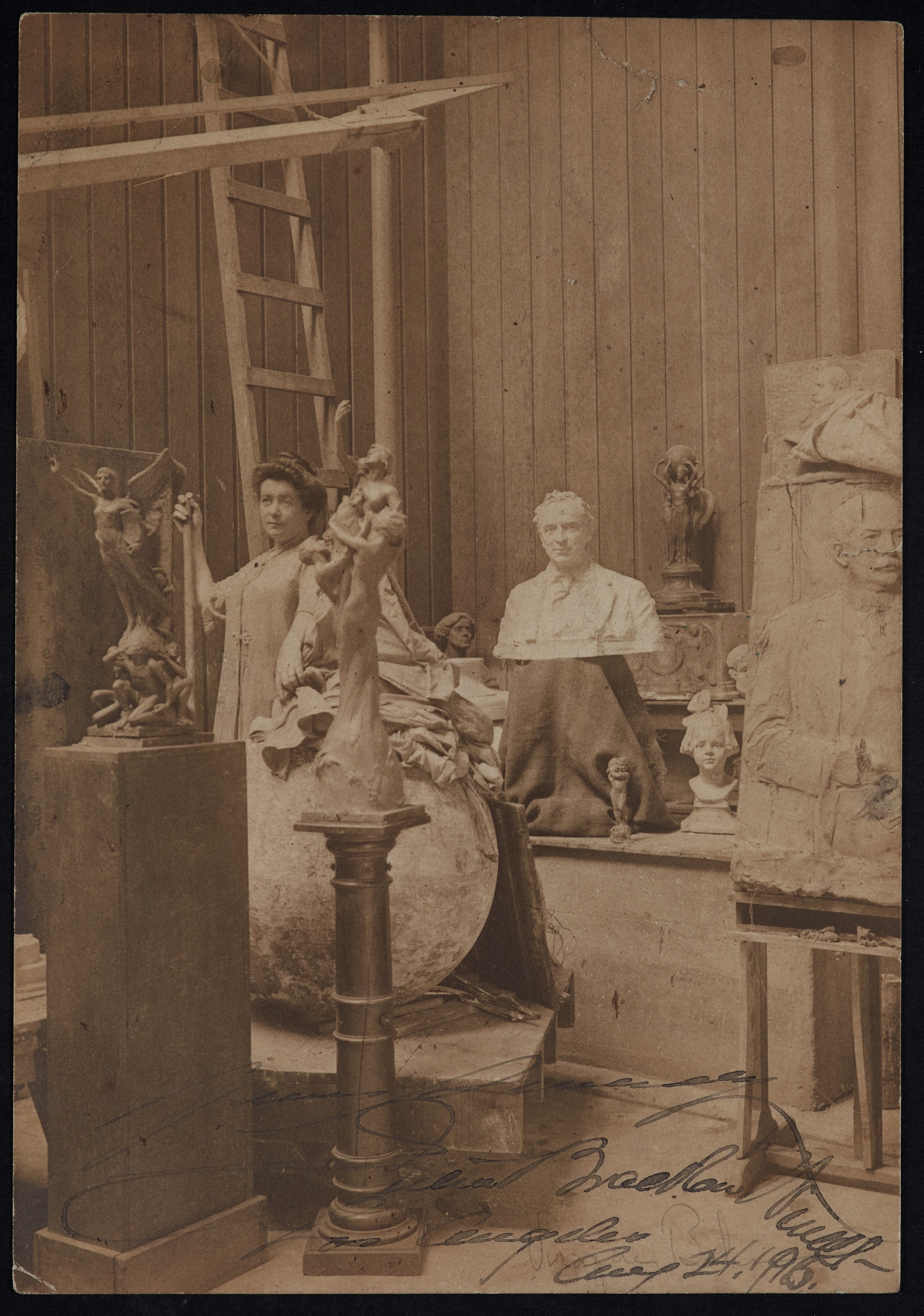
Bracken Wendt in her studio in 1916

Unsupported at home following the death of her mother when she was nine years old, she ran away from home, aged thirteen. By the age of sixteen, she was working as a domestic servant for a woman who recognized her talent and drive, and who paid to enroll her in the Art Institute of Chicago. There, she studied with Lorado Taft and, by 1887, she had advanced to become his studio and teaching assistant. In 1893, during the Columbian Exposition, she was one of several women sculptors nicknamed the White Rabbits who helped produce some of the architectural sculpture that graced the exposition buildings.

Aside from that, she was awarded a commission to produce Illinois Welcoming the Nations for the Fair. The work was later cast in bronze and unveiled at the Illinois State Capitol, at which time Governor Altgeld was the main speaker.

After pursuing her career for a number of years, in 1906 she married painter William Wendt and moved to Los Angeles, California, where she continued her success. In California, she taught at the Otis Art Institute and, with her husband, was instrumental in the founding of the California Art Club in 1909, which was developed on the premise of allowing women and sculptors into the membership.

In 1912, the Wendts moved to Laguna Beach and subsequently built their home/art studio.

Wendt was a member of the National Sculpture Society and exhibited and was featured in both the 1923 and 1929 Exhibitions and the resulting catalogues.

She died in Laguna Beach on June 22, 1942.

== Work ==
Her work can be found in:

- Chicago Historical Society
- Civil War Monument, Missionary Ridge, Chattanooga, Tennessee
- Laguna Art Museum
- Harvard University Portrait Collection
- Old Los Angeles City Hall (now located in the Natural History Museum of Los Angeles County)
- Lincoln Park, Los Angeles, California
- as well as in numerous private collections
