= Hanson Puthuff =

American painter

Hanson Duvall Puthuff (August 21, 1875 – May 12, 1972) was a landscape painter and muralist, born in Waverly, Missouri. Puthuff studied at the Art Institute of Chicago before moving to Colorado in 1889 to study at University of Denver Art School. He traveled to Los Angeles in 1903 and for 23 years worked as a commercial artist painting billboards while painting landscapes in his leisure. In 1926, he abandoned commercial art and devoted his full-time to fine art and exhibitions. He is nationally famous for his lyric interpretations of the Southern California deserts. Puthuff died in Corona del Mar on May 12, 1972.

Puthuff was one of the cofounders of the California Art Club and the Laguna Beach Art Association. He won awards in 1909 from the Alaska–Yukon–Pacific Exposition, a bronze medal at the Paris Salon in 1914, and two silver medals from the Panama–California Exposition in 1915. His works were exhibited at schools and fairs across Arizona, Missouri, and Utah during his life as well. His works are exhibited in, among other places, the Los Angeles County Museum of Art, Laguna Art Museum, Bowers Museum, and the UCI Langson IMCA. His exceptional dioramas backing many of the historical exhibits at the Los Angeles Natural History Museum are still prominently displayed. Many of his works are also cataloged in the Smithsonian American Art Museum art inventory.

In 2007, the Pasadena Museum of California Art featured California Colors: Hanson Puthuff, the first solo museum exhibition of his work. In conjunction with the exhibit, the Museum republished the artist's autobiography.
