= Philip Kran Paval =

Danish painter

- Born: 20 April 1899; Nykøbing Falster, Denmark
- Died: 1 March 1971 (aged 71); Los Angeles, California, United States
- Occupation: Painter

Philip Kran Paval (20 April 1899 – 1 March 1971) was a Danish painter. His work was part of the painting event in the art competition at the 1932 Summer Olympics.
