= Carl Oscar Borg =

Swedish-American painter

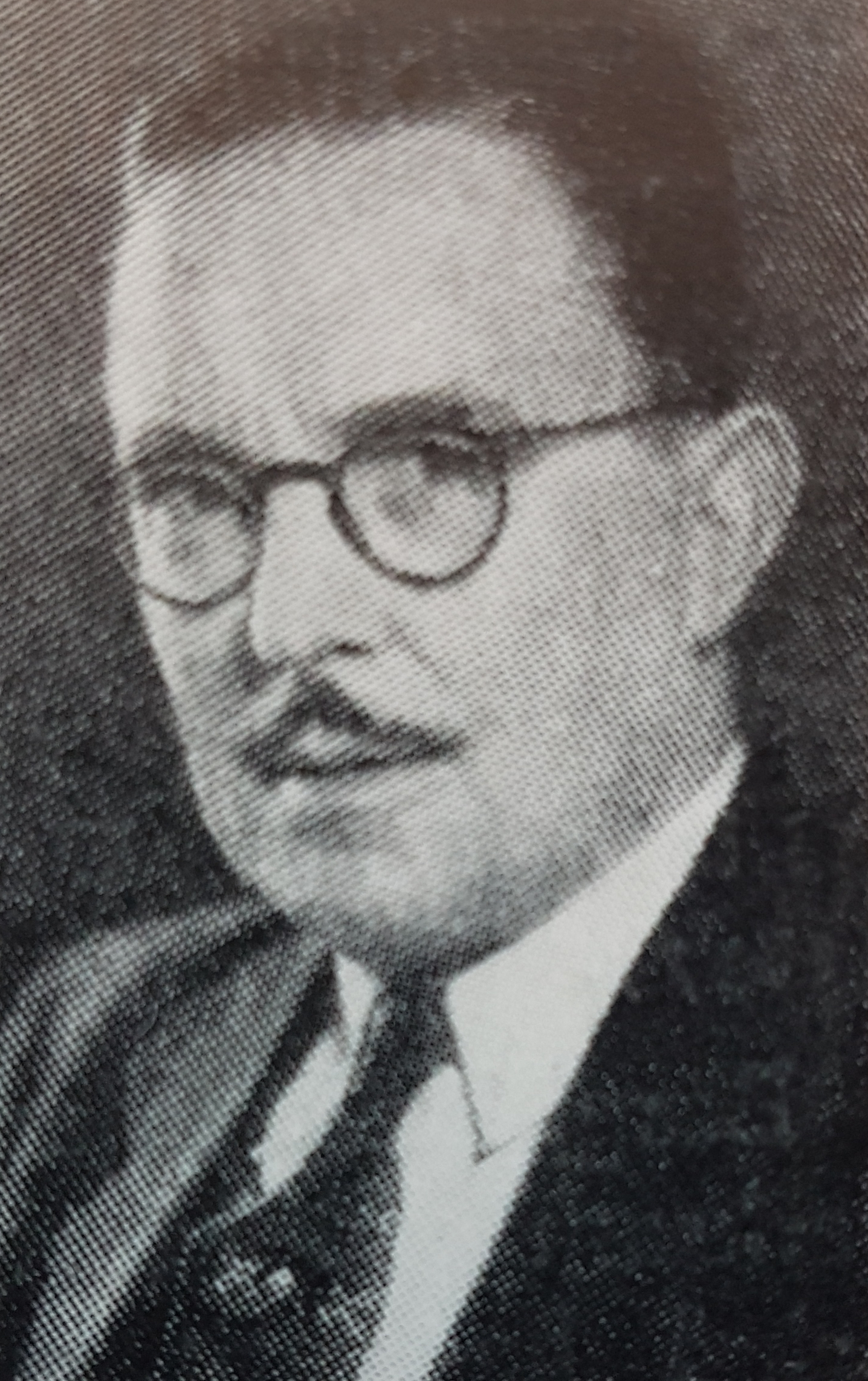
Carl Borg

Carl Oscar (or Oskar) Borg (March 3, 1879 – May 8, 1947) was a Swedish-born painter who settled in the United States and became known for views of California and the Southwest. He worked as a Southwest and California landscape painter, a poster artist for the Atchison, Topeka and Santa Fe Railway, and, in the mid-1920s, as a Hollywood art director.

== Biography ==
Carl Oscar Borg was born into a poor family in Grinstad parish, Dalsland province, Sweden. Oscar Borg moved to London at age 15 to assist portrait and marine artist George Johansen. In 1901, he sailed for the United States. Borg taught art at the California Art Institute in Los Angeles and at the Santa Barbara School of the Arts. He became a protégé of American philanthropist and art patron Phoebe Hearst. She gave him the opportunity to return to Europe to study art.

Borg was influenced by the nature of the southwestern United States, especially the states of Arizona and New Mexico. He worked in various mediums including oil, watercolor, etchings, and woodblock. He was commissioned to paint posters for the railway company, Atchison, Topeka and Santa Fe Railway. His posters were put up on the company's sales offices and attracted attention. He was known for his dramatic paintings of the Grand Canyon.

Borg was a founding member of the Painter's Club of Los Angeles and the California Art Club. He was one of the first art directors for a major movie studio in Hollywood, working on silent film productions in the years 1925–1928; he served as supervising art director on Douglas Fairbanks's Technicolor swashbuckler The Black Pirate (1926), overseeing construction of the film's pirate-ship sets. Examples of his art are on display at Brigham Young University, Harvard University, Smithsonian American Art Museum and the Fine Arts Museums of San Francisco. A substantial collection of his paintings and prints, as well as large parts of his personal collection, were given to the Världskulturmuseet in Gothenburg and Etnografiska museet in Stockholm, both branches of the Statens museer för världskultur (National Museums of World Culture) in Sweden, as gifts during his lifetime and by his widow.

His work was also part of the painting event in the art competition at the 1936 Summer Olympics.

== Personal life ==
Borg was married to Lily Borg Elmberg. He was a member of the National Academy of Design, the National Academy of Art, Société Nationale des Beaux-Arts and the Salmagundi Club.

== Selected works ==
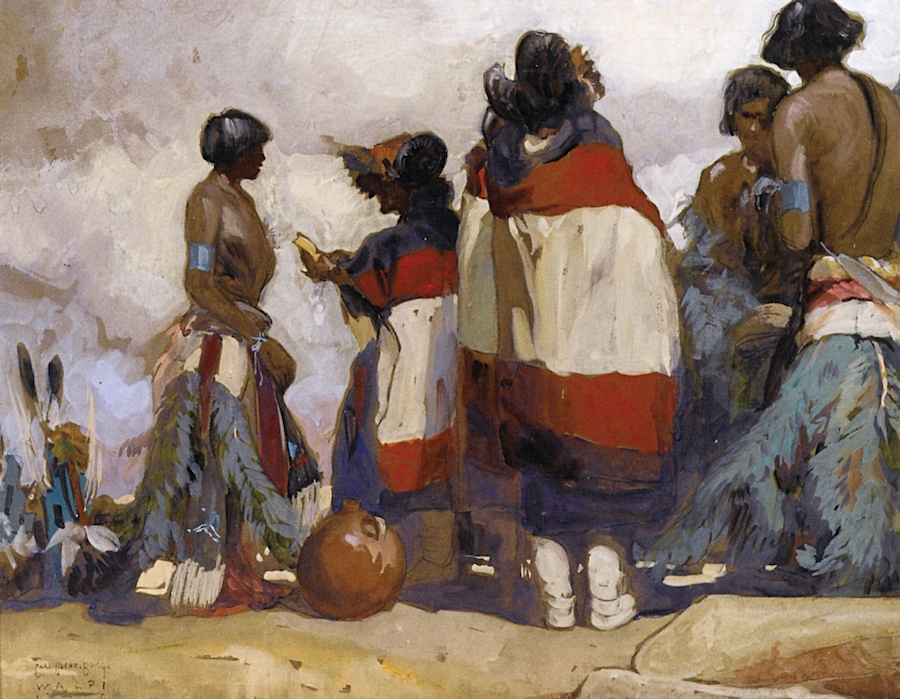
Walpi Women

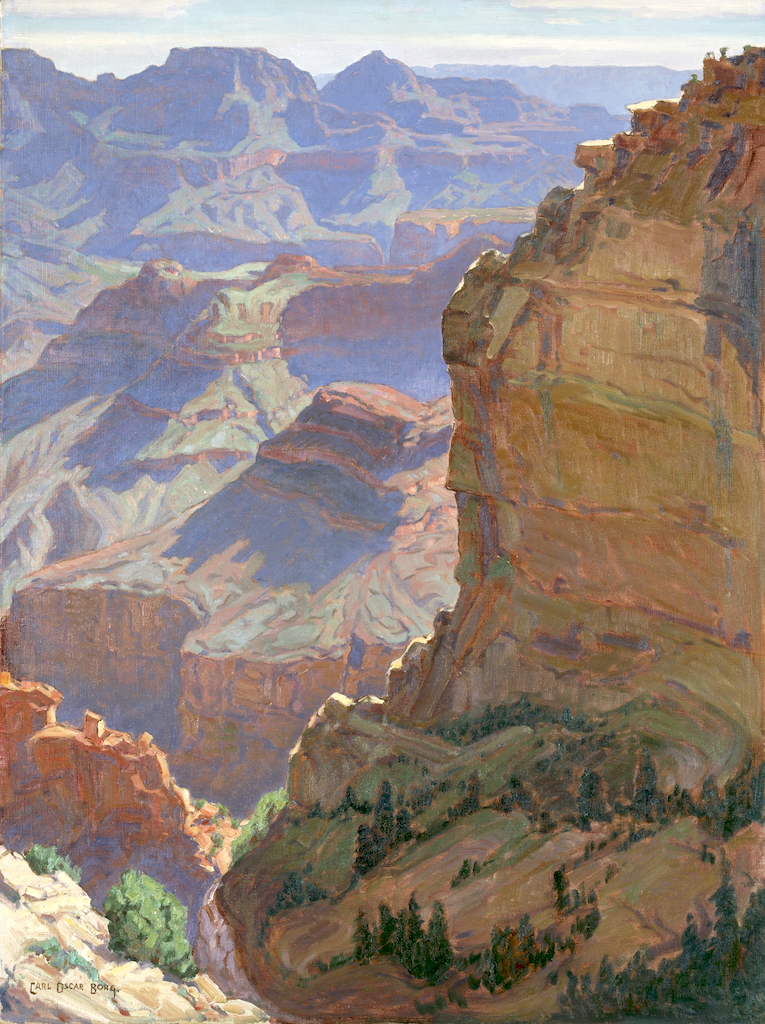
Grand Canyon

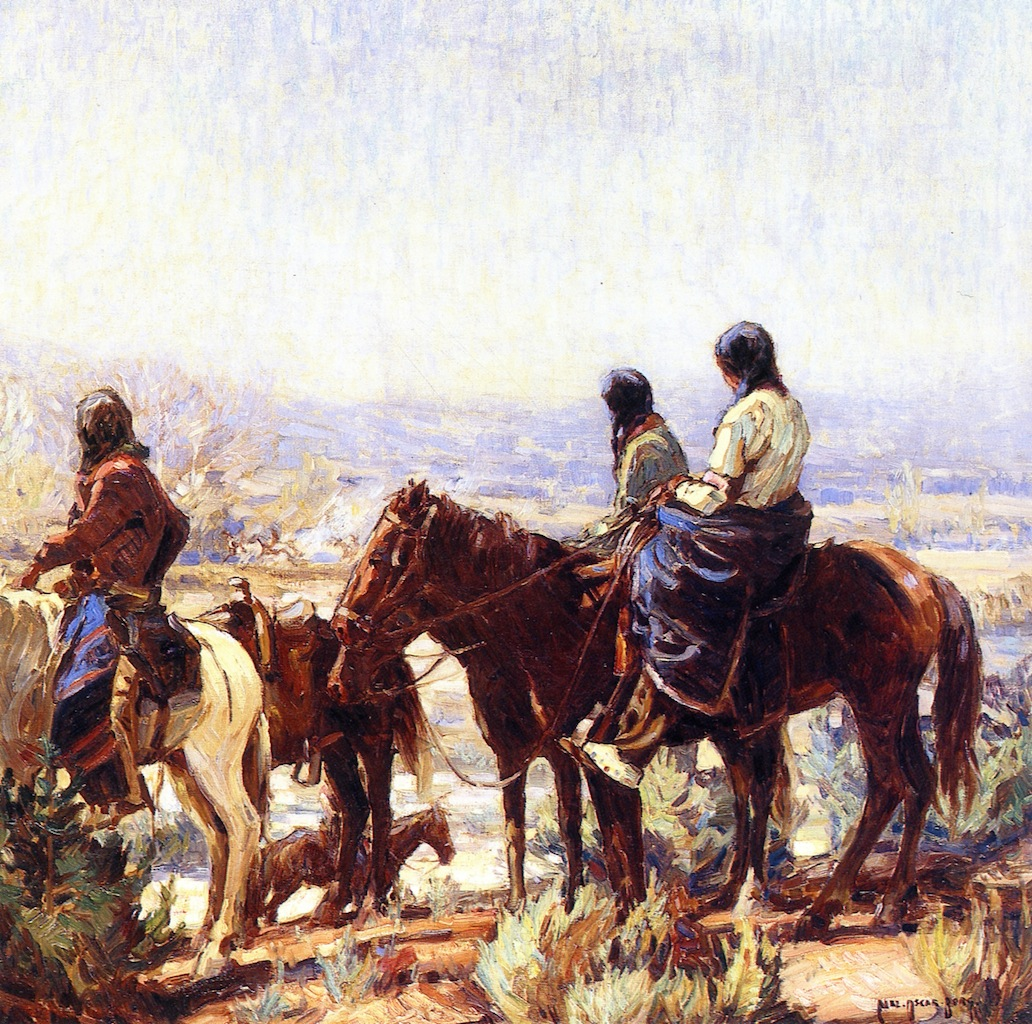
Watching the Race

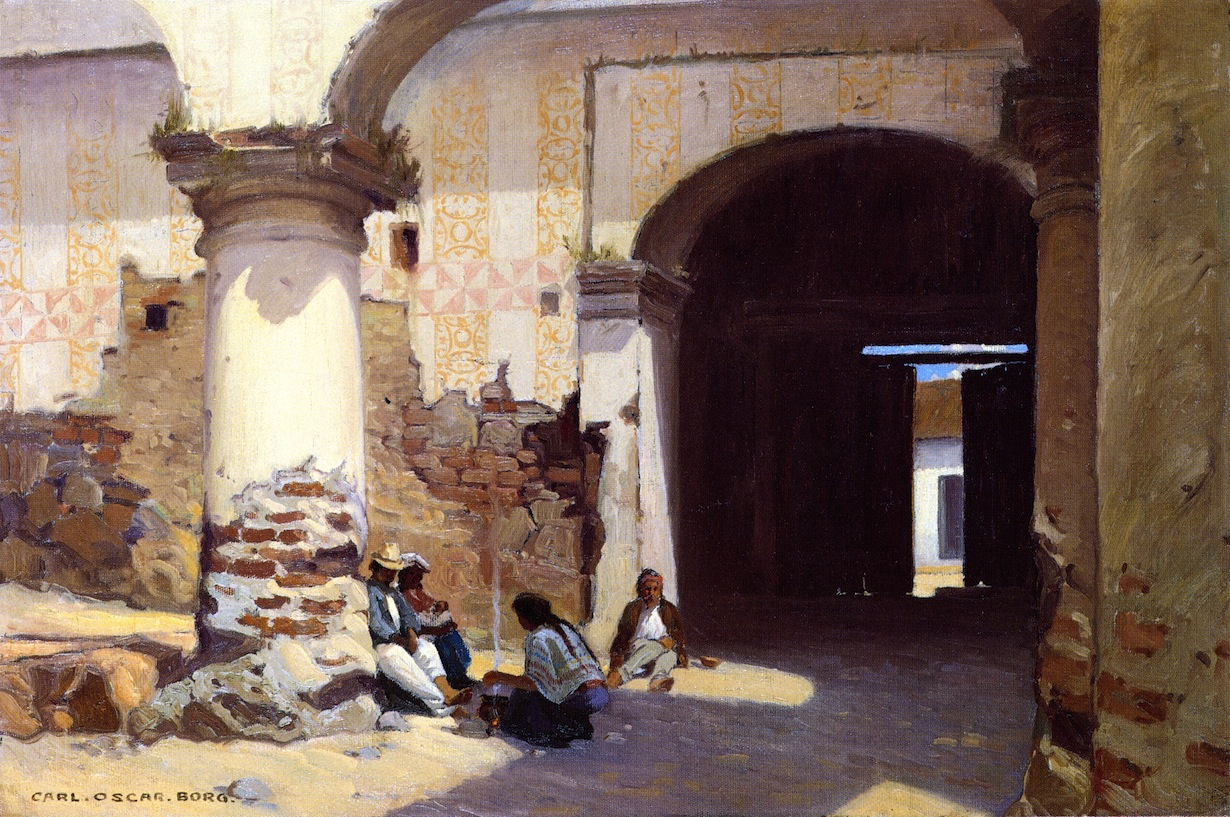
Open Door at the Governor's Palace

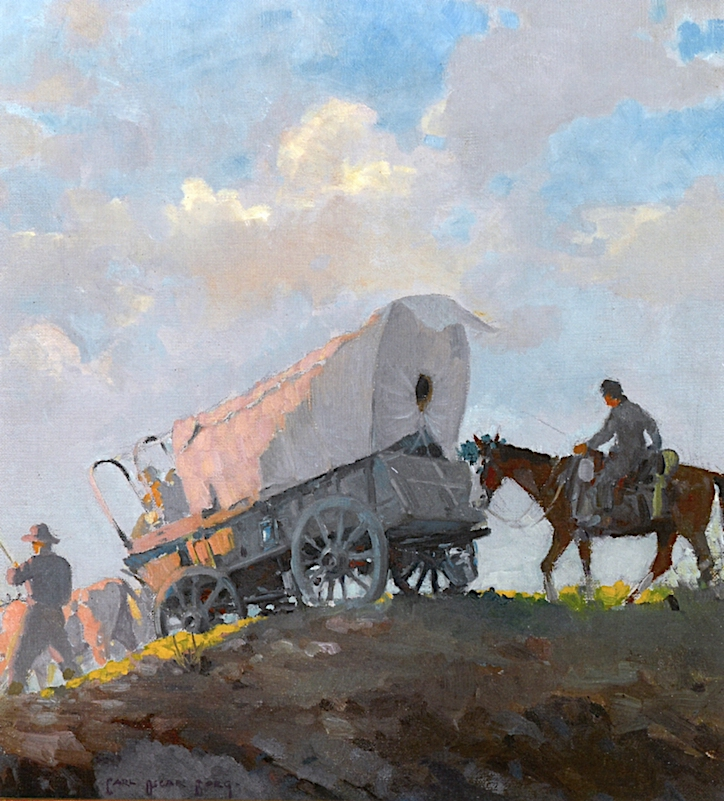
Wagon Train

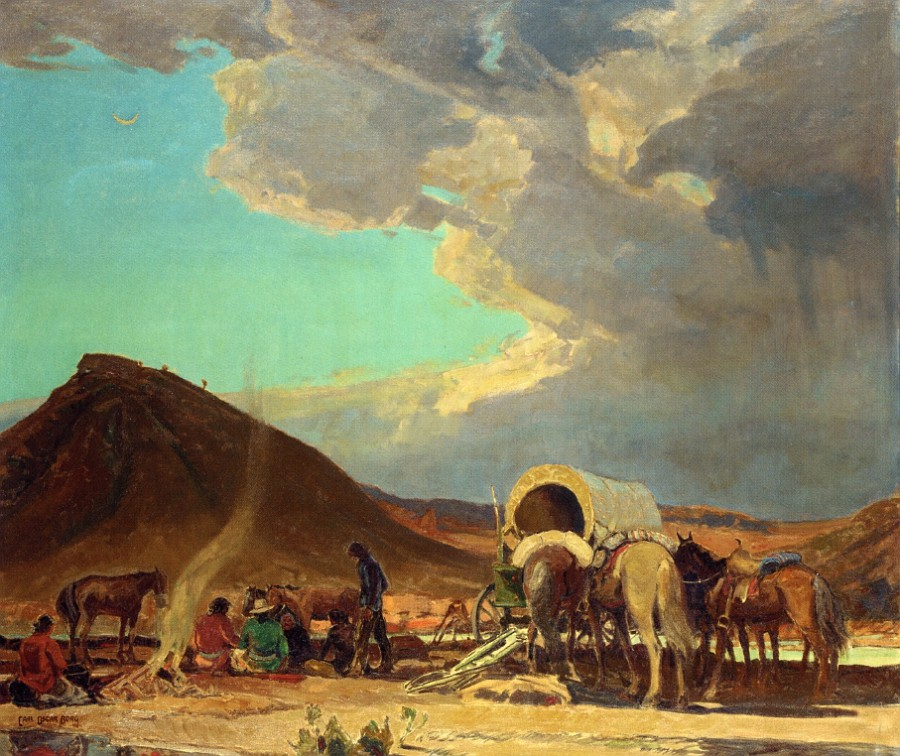
Indian encampment

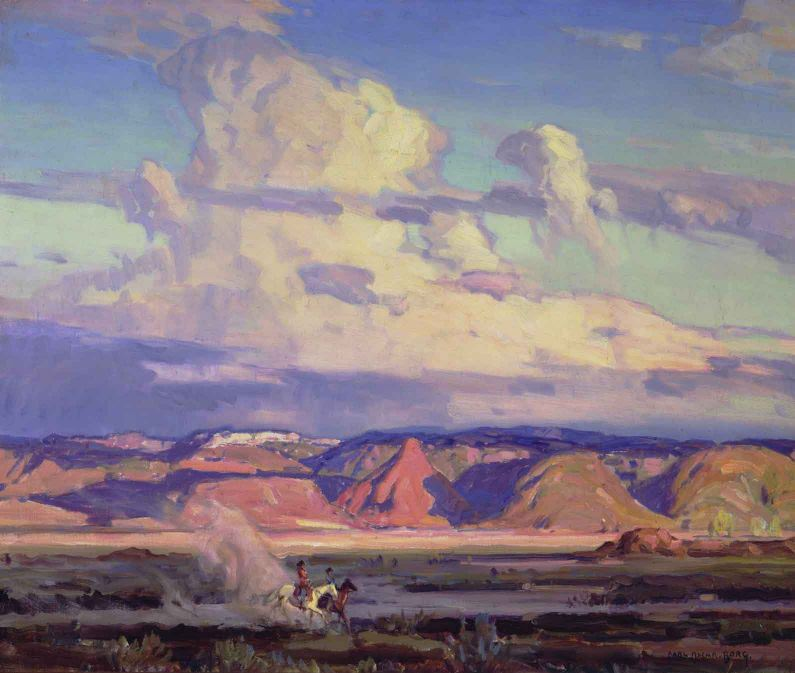
The Badlands, Arizona

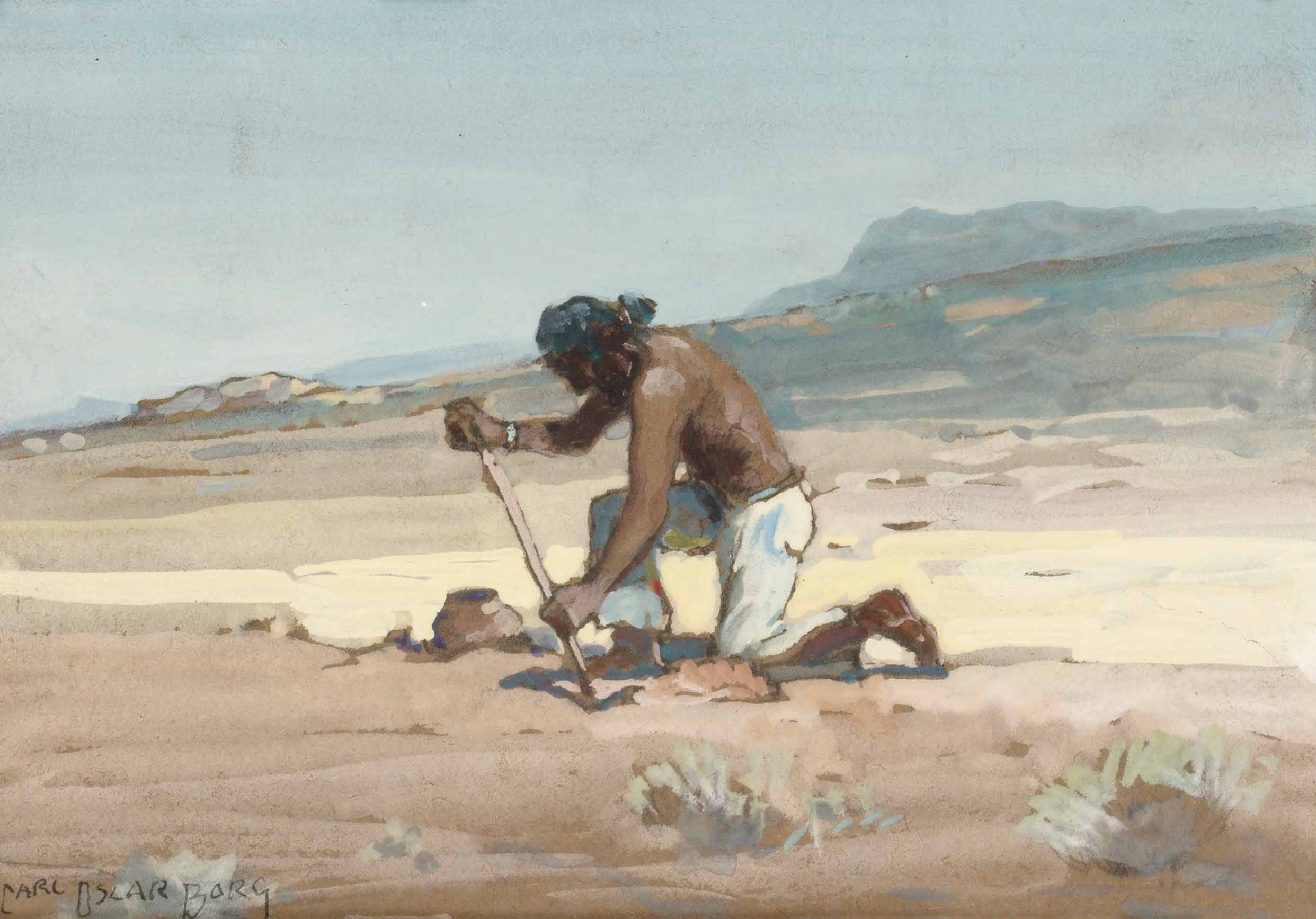
Indian at Work

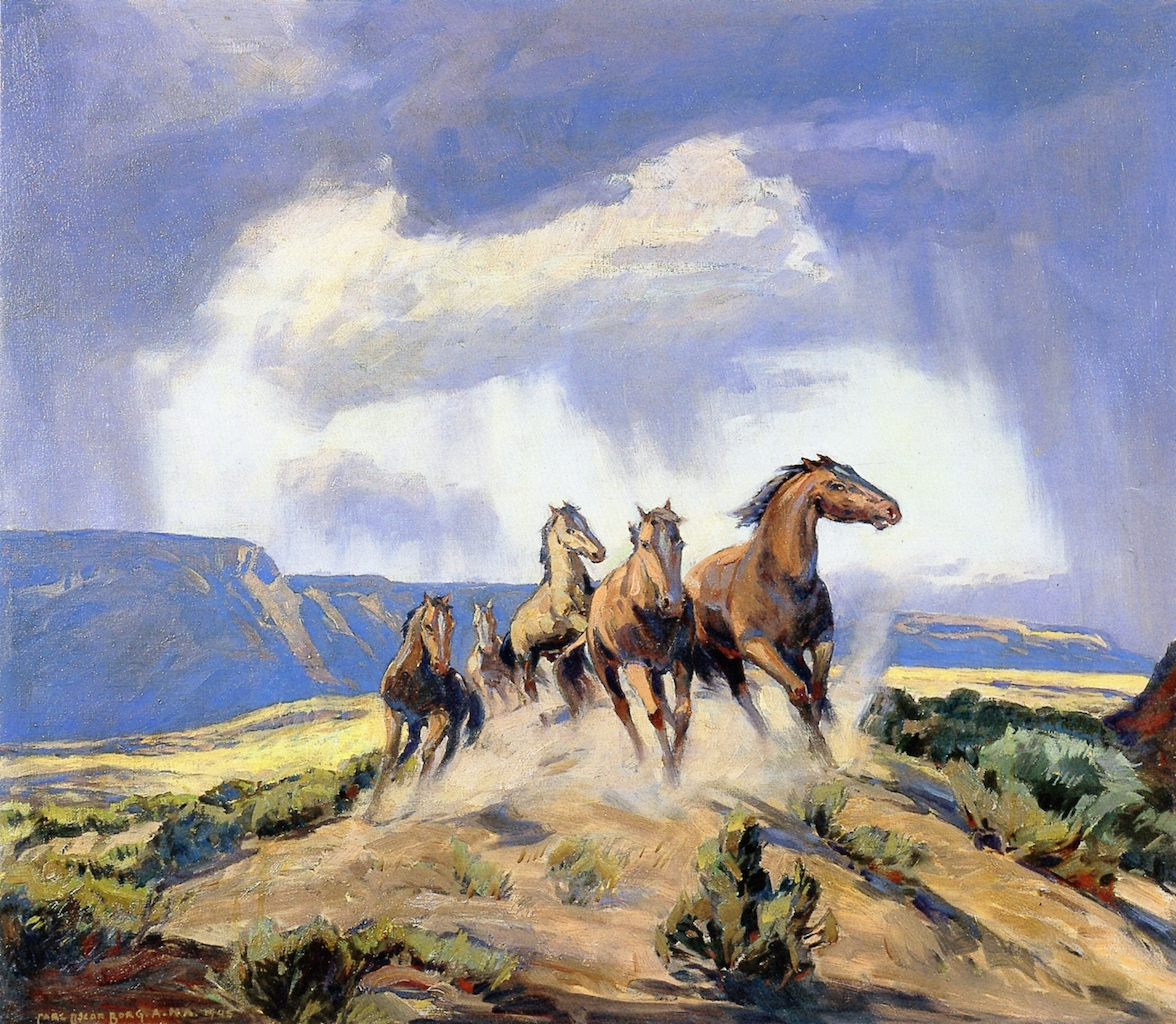
Wild Horses, Nevada
