= William Wendt =

American painter

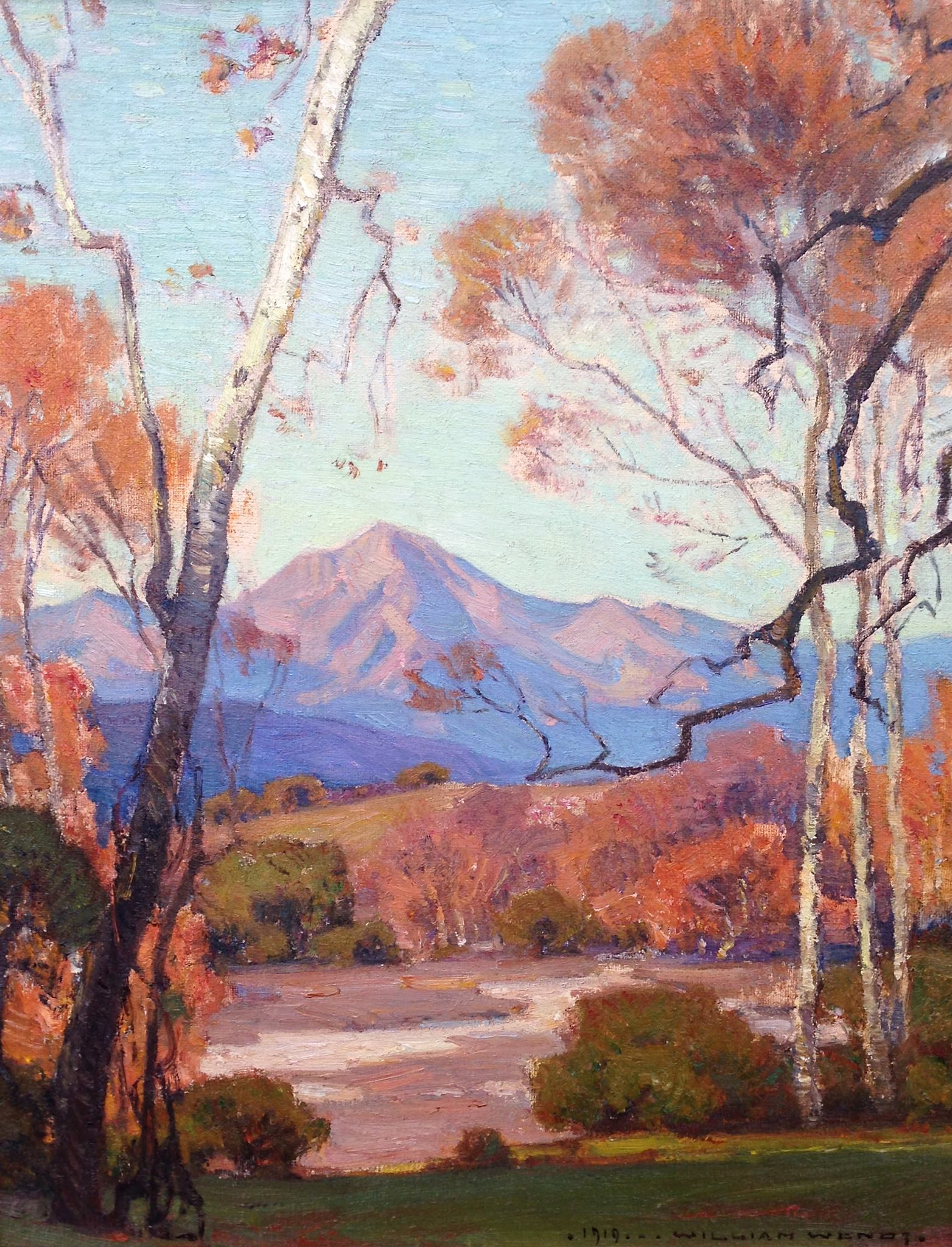
Saddleback, Steven Stern Fine Arts

William Wendt (February 20, 1865, Bentzen, Kingdom of Prussia – December 29, 1946, Laguna Beach) was a German-born American landscape painter. He was called the "Dean of Southern California landscape painters." Associated with the Eucalyptus School, his work is more closely aligned with the Arts and Crafts Movement in California than the French or American Impressionists.

Wendt viewed nature as a divine exhibit, believing his role was to interpret its meaning. His work rarely included people or animals, ensuring the landscape's spiritual essence remained central.

Being the only son of his parents William Wendt and Williamina Ludwig, he underwent an apprenticeship for cabinetmaking in his youth but was left unsatisfied by the experience. He later emigrated by himself to the United States in 1880. From 1894 to 1896, he traveled extensively with his friend, George Gardner Symons. He married the sculptor, Julia Bracken in 1906 and moved to California shortly thereafter.

Between 1912 and 1915, Wendt shifted his artistic approach. He left behind the light and soft qualities of Impressionism. Instead, he started using thicker brushstrokes, giving the natural forms in his paintings a firmer, more defined appearance.

Wendt was a founding member of the California Art Club, along with his wife Julia, and served as its first president for six years.

Wendt built his studio in Laguna Beach, California. A Laguna street, Wendt Terrace, bears his name.

Wendt assisted in the formation of the Laguna Beach Art Association in 1918 and also co established the California Art Club. His contributions were key to organizing the earliest gallery exhibitions for local artists, which solidified Laguna Beach's reputation as a noted art location.

== Early life and education ==
Wendt's first painting experience was reportedly as a staff painter for a commercial art shop where he was responsible for applying a single pigment to a painting in a production line of many artists. Working six days per week, he used his one-day off to go into the field, surrounded by nature and painting to satisfy his own creative talents. He was largely self-taught, having only attended two terms of evening classes at the Art Institute of Chicago.

== Awards ==
- Sole winner of an award at the first Chicago and vicinity annual exhibition, Chicago Art Institute, 1897
- Bronze Medal, Buffalo Exposition, 1901
- Cahn Prize, Art Institute of Chicago, 1904
- Fine Arts Building Prize of the Chicago Society of Western Artists, 1913
- Kirchberger Prize, Chicago Art Institute, 1913
- Silver Medal, San Francisco Exposition, 1915
- Black Prize, California Art Club, 1916
- Ranger Purchase Prize, National Academy of Design, 1926
- Yerkes Prize, 1893
- Young Fortnightly Club Prize, 1897

== Selected paintings ==
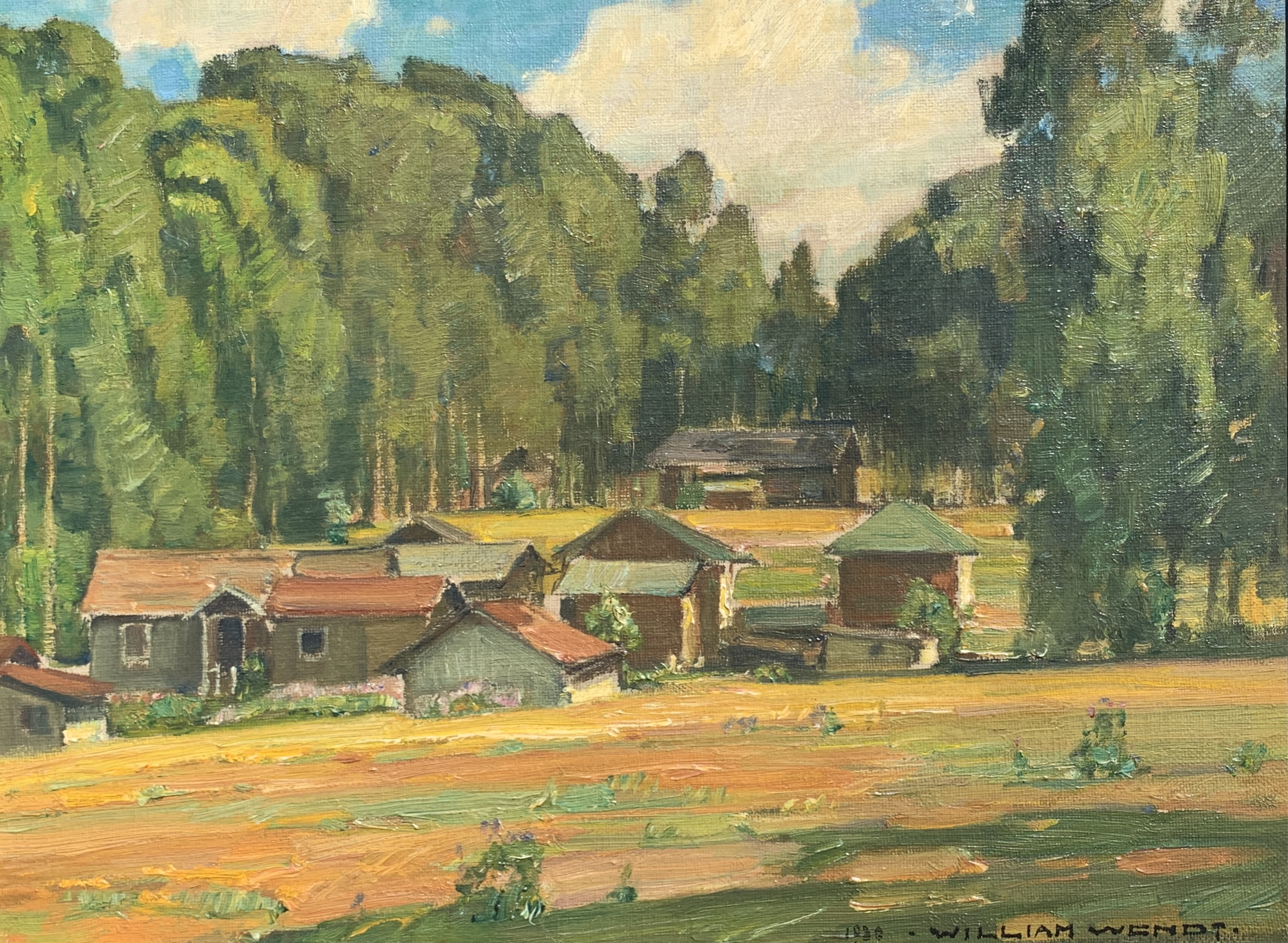
Huddled Houses, Steven Stern

== Galleries and public collections ==
- William Wendt Gallery of Art
- Bowers Museum, Santa Ana, California
- Art Institute of Chicago, Illinois
- Laguna Art Museum
- Irvine Museum, Irvine, California
- Pasadena Art Museum, California
- Richmond Art Museum, Indiana
- William A. Karges Fine Art
- Beale Memorial Library, Bakersfield, California

== Sources ==
- Edan Milton Hughes, Artists in California, 1786–1940, self-published, 1989 ISBN 978-0-9616112-1-7
- South, Will (November 28, 2008). "William Wendt: Plein Air Painter of California". Laguna Art Museum: In Nature's Temple: The Life and Art of William Wendt. Resource Library.
- John Alan Walker, Documents on the Life & Art of William Wendt, self-published, 1992.
- Ruth Lily Westphal, Plein Air Painters of California: The Southland, self-published, 1996 ISBN 978-0-9610520-0-3
