= George Gardner Symons =

American painter

Symons c. 1920

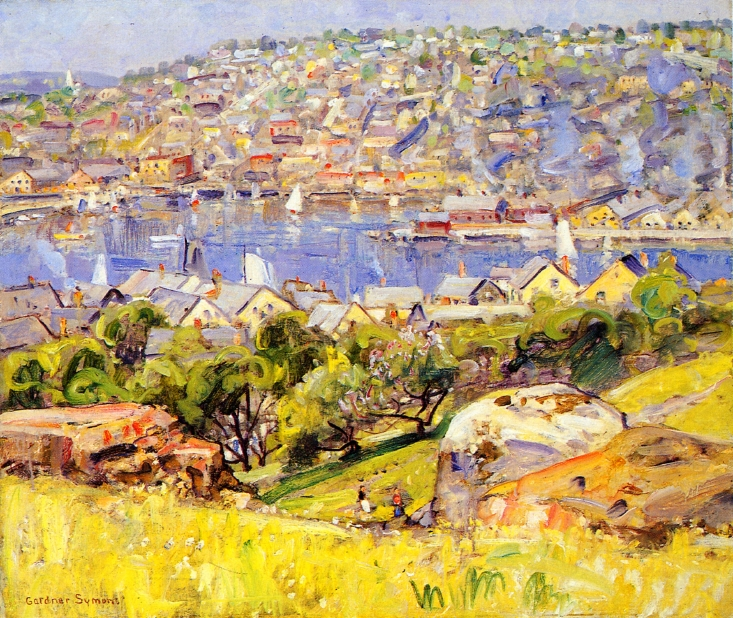
A Fishing Village - St Ives

George Gardner Symons (1861-1930) was an American impressionist painter.

== Career ==
Symons was born in either 1861 or 1863 in Chicago. Attending the School of the Art Institute of Chicago, he also studied in Europe and won awards from the National Academy of Design in Manhattan, New York and the Corcoran Gallery of Art in Washington, D.C. A plein-air painter, he built the first studio in the art colony of Laguna Beach, California during the early 1900s. He died in Hillside, New Jersey, adjacent to Elizabeth in 1930.
