= Pasadena Museum of California Art =

US museum

- Established: 2002
- Dissolved: 2018
- Location: 490 East Union Street, Pasadena, California 91101 626-568-3665
- Coordinates: 34.1469°N 118.1402°W
- Director: Susana Smith Bautista

The Pasadena Museum of California Art (PMCA) was an art museum located in Pasadena, California, United States, showcasing art and design originating from California. The museum was founded by long-time Pasadena residents and art collectors Robert and Arlene Oltman. Ground was broken in 2000 and the museum officially opened in June 2002.

The museum did not house a permanent collection, but instead featured changing exhibits. Notable exhibitions included Maynard Dixon: Masterpieces from the Brigham Young University and Private Collections, the largest exhibition of Dixon's art to date; Wayne Thiebaud: 70 Years of Painting, a retrospective survey; Data + Art: Science and Art in the Age of Information, organized in conjunction with the Jet Propulsion Laboratory, E. Charlton Fortune: The Colorful Spirit, and a mid-career retrospective of painter Mark Ryden. The museum hosted the California Design Biennial.

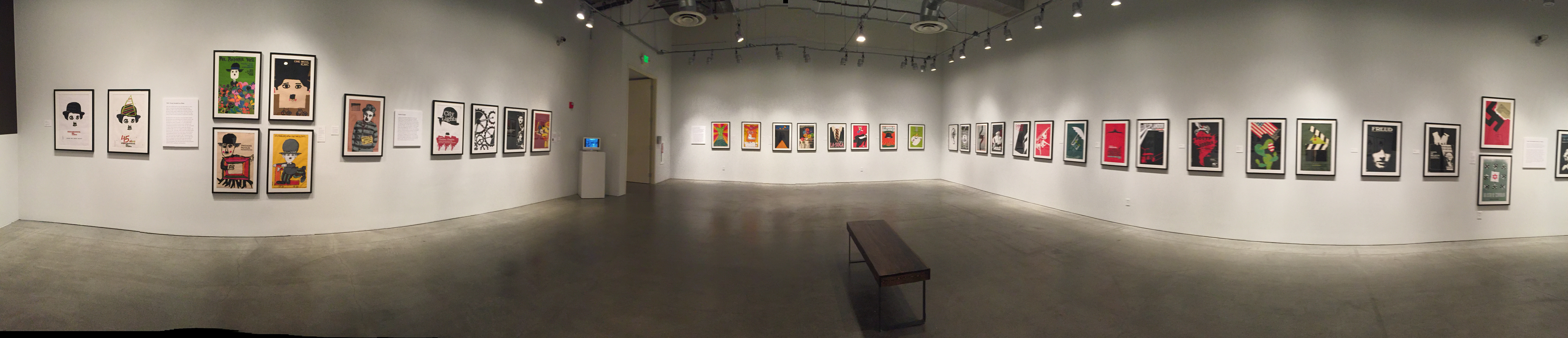
Panorama of the museum's Hollywood in Havana: Five Decades of Cuban Posters Promoting U.S. Films exhibit.

The museum closed in October 2018.
