= Arny Karl =

American painter

Arny Karl (birth name: Arnold Helmut Karl) (July 31, 1940 - February 15, 2000) was one of the key artists in the early stages of the California Plein-Air Revival, which started in the 1980s and continues to this day. Along with Tim Solliday (b. 1952) and Peter Seitz Adams (b. 1950), Karl helped revitalize the use of pastels to paint outdoors or en plein air, as the French described regarding the practice of working directly from nature. Karl was a student of Theodore Lukits (1897–1992), who was a prominent California Impressionist and the best known Early California painter to have worked in pastel. His work has been included in a number of museum exhibitions, is represented in a number of prominent public and private collections and has been the subject of a number of curatorial essays.

== Early life ==
Karl was born in South Tyrol, Italy to an Austrian father, Anton Karl (1899–1984) and an Italian mother, Rosa Maria Adami (1911–1966). His father was a minister and a writer, but it was his mother who encouraged Karl's artistic development through her own interest in design and the arts. The Karl family moved frequently, first to Milan, then to Rome and finally to Florence, where Karl grew up and, as a student, was fascinated and awed by the art of the Renaissance. Karl enjoyed the Italian countryside and was always drawn to nature as a subject. In 1961, he emigrated to the United States and settled in San Gabriel Valley, just east of Los Angeles, where his sister was living after her immigration into the United States. Initially, like many new immigrants, Karl worked at a variety of different jobs but because of his artistic talent, Karl enrolled at Pasadena City College to study commercial sign and scenic painting, which he felt would enable him to pursue a practical career that would still involve art.

== Commercial art career ==
To earn a living, Karl found employment in the outdoor advertising industry. In the 1960s, Los Angeles, with its tremendous urban sprawl, had a large billboard industry and large, colorful billboards towered over the streets and freeways. In that era most of the boards were still hand painted and were essentially large murals that were painted in vast studios, or on site, by artists on scaffolds. Initially, Karl was hired as a 'helper' or apprentice at Foster & Kleiser, a large Los Angeles outdoor advertising firm that is now part of Clear Channel Outdoor. He mixed paints and assisted the more experienced artists, while he learned the technique of completing vast paintings under a strict deadline. Karl quickly climbed up the union ladder and was soon painting his own large billboards for Foster & Kleiser and then for Pacific Outdoor Advertising. Like many commercial artists, he found the lack of creativity in commercial art frustrating and wanted a career as a fine artist, but realized he would need further training. Fortuitously, Bernardo "Barney" Sepulveda, a senior co-worker at Foster & Kleiser, introduced Karl to the iconoclastic figurative painter and Early California pastelist Theodore Lukits. Known as a staunch traditionalist, Lukits' own work and teaching career helped preserve the ideals and methods of the late-19th-century French ateliers and academies. Karl immediately recognized and respected Lukits' knowledge and mastery of pastel and oil landscapes, formal portraits, still lifes, and anatomical drawing and knew he had found a teacher and mentor.

== Personal life ==
Arny Karl was married to the teacher Lee Kietz on June 7, 1969. The couple lived in Rancho Cucamonga, beneath the San Bernardino Mountains that Karl often painted. The Karls had no children and were divorced April 15, 1982. Later, Karl had a long relationship with a woman that he referred to as his wife, Katherine "Kay" Karl, who survived him, but there does not seem to be a record of a formal marriage and there were no children from their relationship. He had a strong, masculine appearance and he was eccentric and colorful in appearance and actions. Karl usually wore paint-splattered clothing and has been described as "looking like he just emerged from the studio", which most often was the case. He could be secretive about his art work, seldom sharing his paintings with anyone except his closest artist friends, who he felt would understand them. In his later years, he was wary of outsiders and reclusive enough that few visitors ever were allowed access to his home. In spite of a generally retiring nature, he developed close friendships with a number of his co-workers in the billboard industry and several of his fellow art students. In his later years, Karl worked in a drafty studio with a complement of cats that was adjacent to his ramshackle home. He was reluctant to see doctors and this quirk contributed to his health issues. He died in a hospital in Ontario, in San Bernardino County, California, after a lengthy illness.

== Artistic education ==
After an introduction from the billboard painter Bernardo "Barney" Sepulveda, Arny Karl entered the Hancock Park atelier of Theodore Lukits (1897–1992), the Lukits Academy, in 1968. At that time painters like R. H. Ives Gammell (1893–1981) in Boston and Lukits in Los Angeles were two of the few fine arts teachers whose instruction was based on the ideals and techniques of the 19th century French École des Beaux-Arts. This type of instruction is now known as the "Atelier Method." The Beaux-Arts method had evolved over hundreds of years from the Renaissance through the 19th century and was brought to perhaps its highest level of refinement by Parisian masters like William-Adolphe Bouguereau (1825–1905), Jean-Léon Gérôme (1824–1904) and Leon Bonnat (1833–1922).

Lukits, who had been teaching since 1924, was a respected California portrait, landscape and still life painter whose work was popular with the film community. He was an award-winning graduate of the Art Institute of Chicago where he had studied with a host of Parisian- and European-trained painters including Alphonse Mucha (1860–1939), Edmund H. Wuerpel (1866–1947), Edwin Blashfield (1848–1936), Karl Albert Buehr (1866–1952), Wellington J. Reynolds (1865–1949), Richard E. Miller (1875–1943), Charles Webster Hawthorne (1872–1930) and Robert Henri (1865–1929). Lukits passed on the accumulated knowledge he learned in his years at the Washington University School of Fine Arts, Chicago Academy of Fine Arts and the Art Institute of Chicago to his students, who began by "drawing from the antique" which meant doing charcoal or graphite portraits of marbles and plaster casts of ancient Roman and Greek statuary. These studies taught the students to understand "values" which are the tonal gradations of light and shadow, applicable to working under artificial lighting conditions in the studio or out of doors under the natural light of the sun or moon. Advancement in a traditional atelier is based on mastery rather than an artificial quarter or semester system, so Karl moved from working from plaster casts to simple still life set-ups only after his instructor was satisfied with his work. Eventually he began to work in color, painting still life set-ups under the colored lights that Lukits used to simulate conditions an artist would find out of doors. As the years passed under Lukits' guidance, Karl also began attending Lukits' anatomy and life drawing classes. Karl studied with Lukits for an entire decade while he supported himself in the field of commercial art and he concluded his studies in 1978.

== Plein-Air painting career ==
From the time he was young, Arny Karl had always loved the outdoors and when he entered the atelier of Theodore Lukits, it was the elderly painter's large collection of Plein-Air Pastels that made the deepest impression on him. While Lukits was no longer working out of doors, he explained the techniques he used in his works of the 1920s to Karl and simulated conditions of natural light in his studio for his students. By the late 1960s, Karl was working out of doors, painted in the foothills of the San Gabriel and San Bernardino Mountains. He brought his works back to the Lukits atelier for the older artist to critique and his steadily work advanced and improved. By the mid-1970s, Peter Seitz Adams (b. 1950) and Tim Solliday (b. 1952), two younger painters who were interested in working out of doors, had entered the Lukits atelier. Karl, who had already been working out of doors for a number of years, served as their early mentor, helping them learn the techniques of working directly from nature. Together the three painters worked painting the stands of Eucalyptus along the Southern California Coast, working in places like St. Malo Beach, where the Adams family had their beach house, the wetlands at Batiquitos Lagoon and Laguna Beach. Karl, Solliday and Adams also made longer sketching trips to the High Sierras, Utah, Yellowstone National Park and the Canadian Rockies. These three painters worked almost exclusively in pastel and dedicated themselves to championing that medium as a method ideally suited to capturing the rapidly changing natural conditions that an artist encountered out of doors. Karl also painted in Europe the entire year of 1971, working in the Alps, Germany, Italy and Greece. He usually worked in small sizes when he painted from nature, from 6 in × 8 in (150 mm × 200 mm) to 12 in × 16 in (300 mm × 410 mm) and then worked up larger paintings in pastel or oil in his studio. Karl held his Plein-Air pastel works closely, seldom exhibiting them or showing them to anyone except his fellow artists, a practice he learned from his teacher and mentor, Theodore Lukits. He saw the pastel work as his reference material for larger, more ambitious works and they served as a form of visual memory, so he seldom wanted to let go of them. In large part because of Karl's influence, by the late 1970s, a number of painters were working out of doors in the Plein-Air Pastel tradition that artists like Theodore Lukits and William Louis Otte (1871–1957) had established in the 1920s.

== Professional career ==
About the time Karl finished his academic studies with Theodore Lukits he began to exhibit his work professionally. He sold his first works to the veteran Los Angeles dealer Howard Morseburg (b. 1924), a relationship that began because of the dealer's long friendship with Thedore Lukits. These early. less mature works were done in oil, "worked up" from his pastel studies. They were brightly colored paintings depicting vivid sunrises and sunsets, broadly painted with little detail. According to Morseburg, because of the intense colors, the paintings did not sell well and after working with Karl for a number of months, the business relationship faded. Karl also began to work with Doug Jones, another veteran dealer who had the Jones Gallery in La Jolla, California. Jones encouraged Karl and purchased and sold a number of his paintings including both figurative and landscape works in oil and pastel. Both Morseburg and Jones have cited Karl's eccentricity and unreliability as an impediment to the development of his artistic career in the 1980s. Karl began working with Trailside Galeries in Scottsdale, Arizona, a large western gallery, in the mid-1980s, but because of his infrequent visits to Arizona, they were never able to sell his work steadily.

It was not until the early 1990s, when he began working with Jeffrey Morseburg, Howard Morseburg's son, that his work began to be exhibited and sold steadily. While he seldom sold his pastel studies early in his professional career, by the mid-1990s, his dealer convinced him that his most personally revealing works were the ones done from nature and that the revival of interest in California Impressionism meant that there was a much greater appreciation for Plein-Air paintings. Morseburg began to market and advertise the works of a number of "Contemporary Plein-Air Painters" with Karl's works advertised and shown along with those of Peter Seitz Adams, Tim Solliday and the aging landscape painter Richard Rackus (b. 1922). Morseburg Galleries also hosted a number of large pastel exhibitions with Karl's work featured prominently. It was from these pastel exhibitions that the collector Sean Sullivan began his collection of pastels of the western American landscape that would later form the core collection for the Southern Alleghenies Museum of Art. Phoebe Faulkner, one of the premier collectors of the works of contemporary California Impressionists, also purchased many works from Morseburg's exhibitions. In the 1990s, Karl also began to paint medium-sized and large works based on his pastel studies and these works were sold by Morseburg Galleries and exhibited at Jones & Terwilliger Galleries in Carmel, California. Patricia Terwilliger of Jones & Terwilliger, was responsible for the sale of Karl's largest work, a 36 in × 45 in (910 mm × 1,140 mm) painting of the Carmel Coast to a Pacific Grove collector. With Morseburg's help, Karl began to exhibit his work with the revived and strengthened California Art Club and his Plein-Air pastels were included in the annual Gold Medal Exhibition as well as the museum shows Treasures of the Sierra Madre and the ecologically-themed exhibition California Wetlands both originating at the Natural History Museum of Los Angeles County.

== Late career and posthumous recognition ==
By the late 1990s, Karl began to experience health problems and was diagnosed with an advanced case of diabetes. He had problems with his eyesight, including severe cataracts that interfered with his ability to paint and his artistic production ceased for months at a time. After learning how to treat his diabetes and having eye surgery, Karl rallied for a time and was able to paint once again. However, by 1999, Karl's health began to decline once again and he died in February 2000 from complications from congestive heart failure. Since his death, Karl's work was the subject of one solo posthumous exhibition titled The Color of Mood, the Pastels of Arny Karl at the Morseburg Galleries in 2005. Karl's works have also been included in a number of exhibitions in public venues. A number of Arny Karl's pastels have been donated to the Southern Alleghenies Museum of Art which is located on the grounds of St. Francis University through the auspices of the Sean and Margaret Sullivan fund, the latest of which was donated in 2008. Sean Sullivan was one of the founders of the Southern Alleghenies Museum of Art (SAMA) and a passionate collector of Plein-Air pastels by Californian and Western American painters, both historic painters like Theodore Lukits and contemporary artists such as Peter Seitz Adams and Gil Dellinger. Three of Karl's works were exhibited in SAMA's 1999 exhibition titled Contemporary Romanticism: Landscapes in Pastel and again in the 2008 Exhibition titled From Charles Burchfield to Peter Adams in 2008. Additional gifts to the Southern Alleghenies Museum's pastel collection are planned. One of Karl's largest works "Windswept Sierras", has been promised to the California Art Club for its permanent collection.

== Assessment and oeuvre ==
Arny Karl's professional career was relatively short, no more than twenty years. In that time Jeffrey Morseburg, his dealer and fellow student of Theodore Lukits, estimates that he painted about 400-500 plein-air Pastels and about 100-150 oil paintings, so his artistic oeuvre was very limited. He was famously eccentric and difficult, so relationships with dealers were seldom steady. According to Morseburg's essays, Karl's earliest pastel works from the late 1960s and early 1970s were "blocky" with bold strokes of color. As his pastel works matured, the strokes of pastels became almost imperceptible, as he began to "paint" with his fingers. Karl's pastel works of the mid-1990s consisted primarily of foothill scenes, often of California Oaks or Eucalyptus. Some of his later pastel works could be quite detailed, in spite of the artist's eye problems. Sierra Autumn, Big Sur Overlook and Mono Lake, all of which were shown in public exhibitions, are all examples of these detailed pastels. Karl's early works in oil were thinly painted, with little impasto and boldly colored, evidently too boldly for many collector's tastes. His later oils could be more thinly painted or thickly brushed examples of California Impressionism. Most of these works relied on imprecise brushwork and were painted in a cool palette. Scenes of the Central California Coast and the High Sierras predominated in the works of Karl's last decade. Art authorities such as Michael Tomor, former Chief Curator of the Southern Alleghenies Museum of Art or art curator Jeffrey Morseburg, describe Karl as a "romantic" or "lyrical" painter because of his "moody" subjects and curvilinear compositions. In his 1999 exhibition catalog Tomor stated that "Jeffrey Morseburg, Lukits' biographer, believes Karl to be inspired by Lukits' pastels as well as the works of Caspar David Friedrich (1774-1840) and J. M. W. Turner (1775-1841). His Blue Moment and Pink Moments, plein-air pastels of the Sierra Mountains, convey the sublime and awe inspiring aspects of nature." While Karl's artistic oeuvre was small, because of his influence on a number of younger painters, strident advocacy of plein-air painting and the pastel medium and presence in several important public and private collections his influence is still being felt.

== See also ==
- California Art Club
- California Plein-Air Painting
- American Impressionism
- California Tonalism
- Tonal Impressionism
- Decorative Impressionism
- Theodore Lukits
- Peter Seitz Adams
- Tim Solliday

== Notable works ==
Notable Works by Arny Karl

== Museum exhibitions ==
- From Charles Burchfield to Peter Adams: Watercolors and Pastels from the Permanent Collection Southern Alleghenies Museum of Art, Loretto, Pennsylvania, March 21 - Sept 14, 2008; exhibited: Pink Moment, Blue Moment, San Gabriel Peaks
- Contemporary Romanticism: Landscapes in Pastel, Southern Alleghenies Museum of Art, Loretto, Pennsylvania, April 4 - May 30, 1999; exhibited: Pink Moment, Blue Moment, San Gabriel Peaks
- Treasures of the Sierra Madre, Natural History Museum of Los Angeles County, May 28 - August 30, 1998; Muckenthaller Cultural Center, Fullerton, California, September 12 - October 30, 1998
- California Wetlands: Paintings of California Endangered Species and Protected Wetlands, Natural History Museum of Los Angeles County, April 13 - September 1, 1996; exhibited: Mono Lake
- 86th Annual California Art Club Gold Medal Exhibition, Arcadia, California, Spring 1996; exhibited: Windswept Sierras
- 88th Annual California Art Club Gold Medal Exhibition, Arcadia, California, June 14–22, 1998; exhibited: Sierra Autumn and Big Sur Overlook

== History of professional representation ==
- Estate Representation, Jeffrey Morseburg, 2000–present
- Morseburg Galleries, West Hollywood & Los Angeles, California, c. 1990–2000
- Jones and Terwilliger Galleries. Carmel-by-the-Sea, California, c. 1994
- Trailside Galleries, Scottsdale, Arizona, c. 1982–1985
- Jones Gallery, La Jolla, California, c. 1980–1990
- Howard Morseburg Galleries, Los Angeles, California, 1980–1985
