= Lukits =

Lukits is a surname. Notable people with the surname include:

- Eleanor Merriam Lukits (1909–1948), American painter
- Theodore Lukits (1897–1992), Romanian-born American painter
