= Theodore Lukits =

American painter (1897–1992)

Theodore N. Lukits
- Theodore Lukits at Los Angeles museum, 1937
- Born: November 26, 1897; Timișoara, Austria-Hungary (now Romania)
- Died: January 20, 1992 (aged 94); Santa Monica, California, United States
- Education: St. Louis School of Fine Arts, Chicago Art Academy, Chicago Art Institute, Barnes Medical College, Alphonse Mucha
- Known for: Landscape painting, portraiture, illustration, mural painting
- Movement: California Plein-Air, American Impressionism

Theodore Nikolai Lukits (November 26, 1897 – January 20, 1992) was a Romanian American portrait and landscape painter. His initial fame came from his portraits of glamorous actresses of the silent film era, but since his death, his Asian-inspired works, figures drawn from Hispanic California and pastel landscapes have received greater attention.

Lukits began his professional career as an illustrator while still in his teens. He was a still life painter, muralist and founder of the Lukits Academy of Fine Arts in Los Angeles for more than sixty years. He had the reputation of a craftsman who made his own paints from raw pigments, constructed brushes and palettes, and designed and carved frames. Lukits was responsible for keeping the "Beaux-Arts" methods of the French academic system alive in the western United States, and several of his students went on to prominent careers. His works are displayed in many public collections. He was a member of a number of professional art organizations and won many awards in competitions. Lukits has been the subject of a number of solo museum exhibitions since his death, and his work has been included in a number of other museum exhibitions devoted to Tonalism and California and American Impressionism.

== Early history ==
Lukits was born Nicolae Teodorescu in Timișoara, Transylvania, which was then part of the Austro-Hungarian Empire. His father, Theodore Lukits, Sr., was a butcher, and his mother was a homemaker. He came to the United States at age two when his family immigrated in 1899, and he grew up in St. Louis, Missouri. Lukits began formal studies at the St. Louis School of Fine Arts (now the Sam Fox School of Design & Visual Arts) at Washington University in St. Louis before he was twelve. His first teacher was Edmund H. Wuerpel (1866–1958). He also studied with Richard E. Miller (1875–1943) in St. Louis, who had returned home from the art colony of Givery and was staying with his parents. Lukits left public school after the 8th grade in order to pursue a career in art, with the full cooperation of his parents. He worked from an early age, first as an office boy and then as an airbrush artist, painting delicate girls' heads on leather.

== Education in Chicago ==
Lukits moved to Chicago when he was fifteen to attend the Chicago Academy of Fine Arts and the Art Institute of Chicago. At the Chicago Academy he studied with the painter, illustrator and traveler Carl Werntz (1874–1944) who founded the school in 1902. He also studied with William Victor Higgins, who later became famous as one of the Taos Ten of the Taos art colony.

Lukits began at the Art Institute of Chicago with evening, weekend and summer classes because he was unable to enroll as a full-time student until he turned eighteen. Lukits studied with a number of instructors at the institute, but his main teachers and mentors were the American Impressionist Karl Albert Buehr (1866–1952), the society portrait painter Wellington J. Reynolds (1866–1949) and the figurative painter Harry Mills Walcott 1877–1930). Lukits worked under Edwin Blashfield (1848–1936) at some point in his Chicago years, presumably as an assistant on a mural project in the Midwest, but it is not known when. He also studied with the realist painters Robert Henri (1865–1929), Charles Webster Hawthorne (1872–1930), and George Bellows (1882–1925), who were guest instructors at the Art Institute during Lukits' tenure.

Another painter Lukits was influenced by was Housep Pushman (1877–1966). He first met the Armenian artist in 1916 in Chicago, where he had an exhibition at the Art Institute of his figurative works and Asian-themed still lifes.

During his student days, Lukits shared a studio with the Swedish-born painter Christian von Schneidau (1893–1976). The two became friends in Chicago and would later renew their friendship in California where they both would paint portraits of movie stars.

He won every major award at the Art Institute, including the Bryan Lathrop Traveling Scholarship. He paid for his studies by painting illustrations for major publications such as Cosmopolitan and The Saturday Evening Post. After his graduation in 1918, he returned for post-graduate work the following year under Karl Buehr. His last period of artistic study was a special scholarship which enabled him to study and travel with the Czech master of Art Nouveau, painter and Illustrator Alphonse Mucha (1860–1939) who was exhibiting his Slav Epic murals in the United States.

Lukits also attended Barnes Medical College to study human anatomy.

== Professional career ==
Study of an Old Man, Theodore Lukits (1915)

After he arrived in California he rapidly became known for his portraits of early Hollywood figures Theda Bara, Pola Negri, Mae Murray and Alla Nazimova. The portrait Lukits painted of the Mexican actor Dolores del Río was exhibited at the premiere of one of her films and reproduced in newspapers in Los Angeles and Mexico City.

Lukits opened the Lukits Academy in early 1924 and continued teaching until his retirement at age ninety. He was a well-known plein-air painter, choosing the pastel medium for more than one thousand sketches he did on location in the Sierra Nevada, Death Valley, the Mojave Desert, along the California coast and at the Grand Canyon. In the early 1930s Lukits also did a series of paintings of vaqueros and female dancers that are now known as the Fiesta Suite, as studies for a mural project for Howard Hughes that was never completed. This series of pastel and oil studies depicted many of the horsemen and young Latino actresses who came to Los Angeles to work as riders, stuntmen and extras in Hollywood films.

Lukits has been the subject of retrospective exhibitions at the Pacific Asia Museum in Pasadena, California; the Carnegie Art Museum in Oxnard, California; the Muckenthaller Cultural Center in Fullerton, California; and Mission San Juan Capistrano.

In addition to art students, Lukits taught Hollywood makeup artists. The prominent makeup artist Louis Hippe (1909–1967) advocated the study of drawing and anatomy under Lukits in order to understand the planes and facial structure of the human head and how it would appear under artificial light, and a number of other makeup artists followed him to Lukit's atelier in the 1930s and 1940s.

== Exhibitions ==
From the mid-1920s through the early 1930s, Lukits had a number of solo exhibitions in southern California. The fall of 1926 may have been his most successful season. He had an exhibition at the Southby Salon on Larchmont Boulevard that opened on September 23. The review in the Los Angeles Times stated, "About 100 people attended. The event of the evening was the first showing of the artist's striking portrait of Ethel Wade."

Souvenir of Seville, oil on canvas, 80" × 40" (1926), private collection

In November he had a showing in the salon of the Hollywood restaurant the Montmatre Cafe. His work included portraits, landscapes and marines. Along with Count Tolstoy and the actress Dolores Del Rio, he was the guest at a pair of receptions.

Lukits exhibited at a number of the premier Los Angeles galleries during the 1930s. In February 1931, he had an exhibition at the Desert Gallery in Palm Springs. In June he had a large exhibition of landscapes, still lifes and portraits at the Stendahl Galleries. In 1935 he had a solo exhibition at the Barbara Hotel in Santa Barbara. In 1937 he was invited to participate in a special exhibition at Harriet Day's Desert Inn Gallery in Palm Springs, Twenty Paintings by Twenty Artists, which included the work of Maurice Braun, Hanson Puthuff and Maynard Dixon. That same year Harry Muir Kurtzworth curated an exhibition at the Los Angeles Public Library titled Tonal Impressionism, with the works of Frank Tenney Johnson, Jack Wilkinson Smith, Alson Clark and Lukits.

== Marriages ==
Lukits met the aspiring artist and actress Eleanor Merriam (1909–1948) in 1931 when she came to study with him. She became one of his favorite models. He painted a well-exhibited pastel portrait of her in 1932, a prize-winning artistic oil portrait titled Gesture in 1934, and another portrait in 1936. In 1937, the couple eloped to Santa Barbara and were married. In 1940, they purchased a comfortable Spanish-style home on Citrus Avenue, just south of Wilshire Boulevard, adjacent to the Hancock Park neighborhood of Los Angeles.

Working together, Eleanor Merriam Lukits' work showed her husband's influence. He often worked on her pastels and paintings, and his bolder, more confident, stroke can be discerned, according to his biographer. Eleanor Lukits was outgoing, and drew her husband into the social whirl of Los Angeles, where she cultivated patrons and portrait sitters. The couple showed their work together extensively and she participated in many of the exhibitions for women artists of the Southland in the 1930s and 1940s. In 1948, as she and her husband were transferring gasoline from one container to another in their basement, the vapors were ignited by a pilot light. Both Eleanor and Theodore were burned, but her internal injuries led to her death in the hospital.

Several years later, Lukits began dating Lucille Greathouse, a Disney animator and also one of his students. They were married in 1952 after a short courtship. Lukits and his second wife lived a quieter social life, but they exhibited and were active with a number of Southern California's art organizations in the 1950s and early 1960s. From 1952 to 1990, Lucile Lukits helped her husband run his school and business affairs, and her assistance helped put the school on firmer financial footing. After her husband's death, Lucile Lukits took over management of her husband's artwork and estate before passing the responsibility on to his students. In 1997, feeling the effects of Parkinson's disease, she moved to Utah to be closer to her family. She died in Utah in 2003 at the age of ninety-four. There were no children from either of Lukits' marriages.

== Late career ==
The last generation of students that Theodore Lukits taught in the 1970s and 1980s included a number of notable figures. The plein air pastelist Arny Karl (1940–2000) studied with Lukits from 1968 to 1978. The plein air and figurative artist Peter Seitz Adams (b. 1950) apprenticed with Lukits for seven years from 1970 to 1977; and the western and plein air landscape artist Tim Solliday (b. 1952) apprenticed with Lukits for five years. Karl, Adams, and Solliday went on to work extensively in the pastel medium.

In 1990, Lucile and Theodore Lukits, who was then in declining health, donated a large collection of his work to the Jonathan Art Foundation in Los Angeles. This collection, which includes a large selection of his pastels as well as a number of portraits, has been loaned out to museums for exhibitions that have been mounted after his death.

== Posthumous exhibitions ==
Since his death in 1992, Theodore Lukits' work has been the subject of solo exhibitions in California museums. His work has also been part of many other museum exhibitions devoted to California Plein-Air Painting and figurative art. In 1998, a traveling show was organized under the auspices of the California Art Club, titled Theodore N. Lukits: An American Orientalist. The exhibition focused on Lukits' Asian-inspired work, and included stylized portraits, plein-air landscape pastels with Japanese art influences, and a few still lifes of Asian antiques. This exhibition opened at the Pacific Asia Museum in Pasadena, California, then traveled to the Carnegie Art Museum in Oxnard and culminated at the Muckenthaler Cultural Center in Fullerton, where it was combined with some of Lukits' Hispanic-themed works for a new exhibition title, Theodore N. Lukits: From Mandarins to Mariachis. These exhibitions included many of his high-key, brightly-colored works.

Lukits made many studies and portraits of Mexican and Mexican-American sitters, some of which were preparatory works for mural projects. These works were the subject of two different exhibitions at Mission San Juan Capistrano, in 1998 and 1999. The second exhibition, titled Theodore N. Lukits: The Spirit of Old California, was centered on what has been called his Fiesta Suite, a collection of paintings that was used for studies for a mural of an old California fiesta scene created for Howard Hughes. It included more than a dozen figurative works, a collection of pastels, and some works that were created en plein air on the grounds of the missions in the 1920s.

One of his students, Kalan Brunink, followed his lead and became principal artist of the famed Old Town Olvera Street, Los Angeles and has a notable collection of Spanish-Mexican-American paintings and Mission San Juan Capistrano works.

The Southern Alleghenies Museum of Art has a notable collection of plein-air pastels by Theodore Lukits. These have been central to two exhibitions at SAMA, one in 1999, devoted to landscape pastels, and the other in 2008, which featured watercolors and pastels.

Mission San Juan Capistrano was the site of another Lukits exhibition in 2001 titled Romance of the Mission, which was held in the courtyard of the mission in conjunction with the annual benefit dinner.

At the Dressing Table, Gouache, 9 1/4" × 8 3/8" (1917–18), promised gift, California Art Club

September Sunset, pastel, California Art Club

Destination – Falling Star, oil on panel, 30" × 30", private collection

== See also ==
- Peter Seitz Adams
- American Impressionism
- California Art Club
- California Plein-Air Painting
- Decorative Impressionism
- Early California artists
- Arny Karl
- Richard E. Miller
- Tim Solliday
- Tonal Impressionism
- Tonalism
- Carl Werntz
