= California Tonalism =

1890–1920 art movement in California

California Tonalism was art movement that existed in California from circa 1890 to 1920. Tonalist are usually intimate works, painted with a limited palette. Tonalist paintings are softly expressive, suggestive rather than detailed, often depicting the landscape at twilight or evening, when there is an absence of contrast. Tonalist paintings could also be figurative, but in them, the figure was usually out of doors or in an interior in a low-key setting with little detail.

Tonalism had its origins in the works of the French Barbizon school and in the works of American painters who were influenced by them. California Tonalism was born when the emphasis in California landscape painting passed from the grand landscapes of works like those of Thomas Hill and William Keith's early career, to more intimate views of a domesticated landscape. At the same time, the parallel Pictorialist Photography movement was born with gauzy landscapes and figurative photographs that bore a strong resemblance to Tonalist Paintings.

== The Barbizon Influence ==
In the years after the American Civil War, hundreds of American artists went to Europe to study. During this era, the 1870s and 1880s, the French Barbizon school was at the height of its popularity in France and French Impressionism was just beginning to emerge. In the annual Salons, the American painters were exposed to the soft, simple, muted Barbizon landscapes of forests and ponds painted by artists like Jean-Baptiste-Camille Corot (1796–1875), Rosseau and Diaz de la Pena. They also saw the roughly painted peasant scenes by Jean-François Millet, who lived in the tiny village of Barbizon, south of Paris. Some of the Americans became enthusiastic acolytes of the French movement and actually moved to the Village of Barbizon. The Bostonian William Morris Hunt (1824–1879) studied under Millet for several years after the conclusion of his Parisian studies. Hunt was responsible for popularizing the works of the French painters with American patrons of the Gilded Age and by the 1880s, their works were highly sought after and extremely valuable, from New York and Boston to San Francisco. Hunt's student John La Farge (1835–1910) also carried the Barbizon torch and developed his own, expressive versions of the French works. Other painters who were similarly influenced were Alexander Wyant (1836–1892), Henry Ward Ranger (1858–1916), Dwight William Tryon (1849–1925) and Charles Warren Eaton (1857–1937). The established landscape painter George Inness, who began his career when the Hudson River School was at its zenith, began to simplify his works and adopt what is now known as the Tonalist style, but then it could be referred to as Quietism. As American artists who had traveled or studied abroad brought the Barbizon style back with them, even homegrown talents were influenced. By the 1890s, dozens of Eastern American painters, in the American Barbizon school, were painting muted, intimate landscapes with a narrow range of colors and some of them were even exhibiting works of French peasants.

=== Whistler influence ===
The other major influence on the development of American Tonalism was the expatriate American painter James Abbott McNeill Whistler. Whistler was eccentric and unique and there were a number of different influences that were responsible for his artistic development. Because he lived and studied in Paris, he was familiar with the Barbizon School and knew a number of the French artists, but he was also a major exponent of Japonisme, the European and American movement influenced by Japanese art, especially their woodblock prints. Whistler was a major influence on a number of younger American artists with whom he came into contact in Europe. He advocated close color harmonies and simplified compositions, devoid of what he considered extraneous detail.

== Tonalism in Northern California ==
At the same time the California landscape became domesticated and its cities and towns were becoming well-developed, a group of artists a generation younger than William Keith and Thomas Hill were emerging in Northern California. Their development coincided with the popularity of the French Barbizon School with collectors and the growth of an American school of painters who had been influenced by the French movement. So, it seems natural that they turned to Tonalism to render and express their vision of the Northern California landscape, especially when the climate was often wet and misty.

== Tonalism in Southern California ==
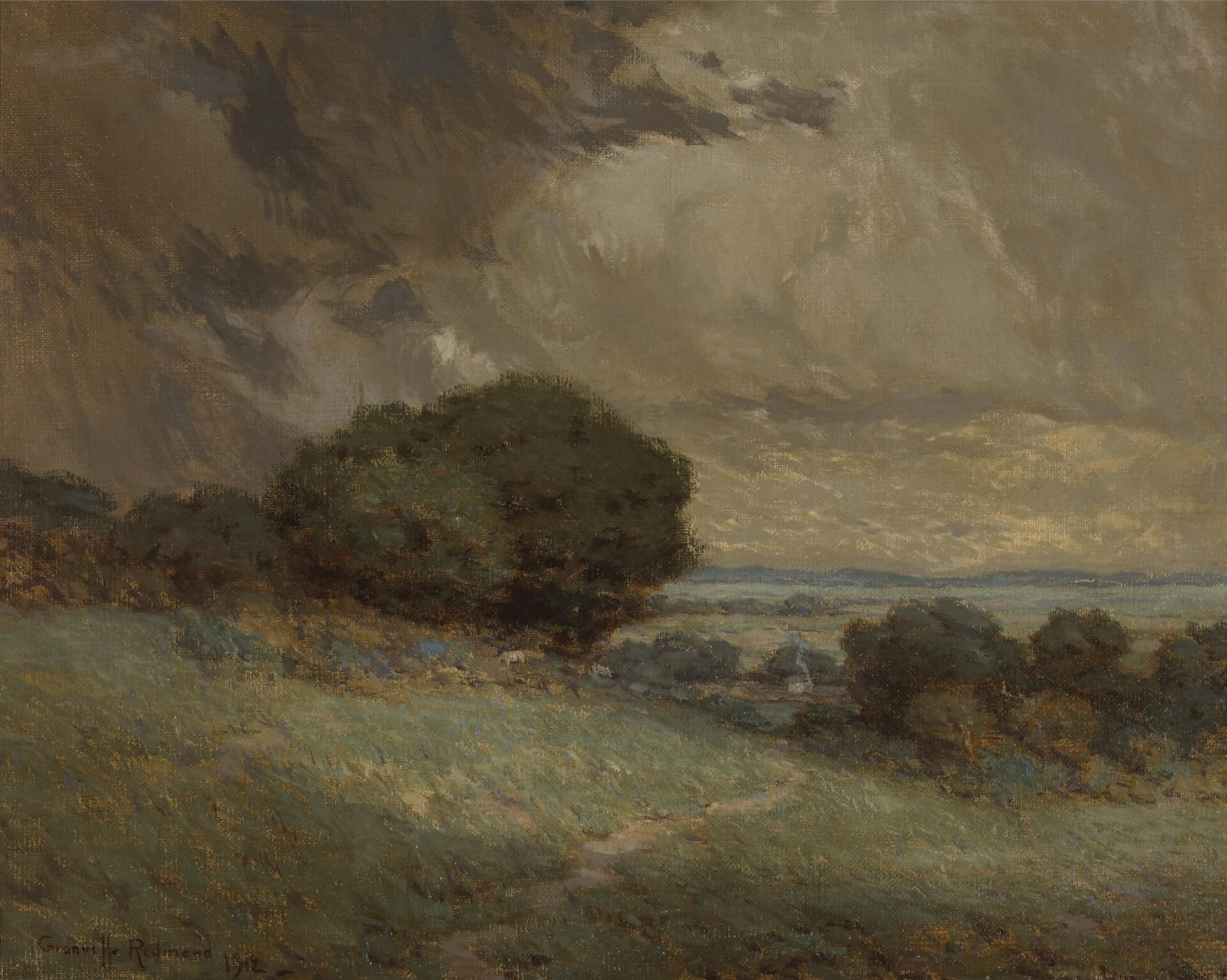
Granville Redmond, The Passing Storm, 1912, oil on canvas. 24.2 in (61.5 cm) x 30 in (76.2 cm).

In spite of Southern California's intense sunlight, a number of the artists who worked in and around Los Angeles in the last decade of the 19th century and the first few years of the 20th century at least began their careers as Tonalists. At that time, Barbizon paintings were extremely popular among collectors and many of the most successful American painters worked in Barbizon an influential style. The wooded glades that artists in France and Northern California favored were not abundant in Southern California, so some of the painters such as Elmer Wachtel, William Lees Judson, and Charles Ward painted the wooded arroyos in the Barbizon style. When Granville Redmond returned to California from Europe, he settled in Southern California, rather than farther north where he had grown up. The paintings that he painted in Southern California were not the poppy filled landscapes that most viewers are familiar with today, but very atmospheric landscapes or even scenes of sheep that show the influence of the Barbizon School. It was only many years later that he would turn to poppy fields rendered in an almost pointillist technique. John Bond Francisco, painter and symphony violinist, also began his career with Tonalist landscapes.

== California Pictorialist Photography ==
There was also a strong Camera Pictorialist movement in California and many of these photographers worked in a Tonalist manner, shooting and developing gauzy photographs of figures or landscapes or even figures in the landscape with a soft focus and absence of dramatic contrast. The aim of the early Pictorialists (a term that came into wide use about the turn of the 20th century) was for their photography to emulate painting and etching and Camera Pictorialism developed in parallel with Tonalist painting. In fact, one of the most famous figures in the Eastern Pictorialst movement was Edward Steichen, who was both an artist and a photographer. Two of the California Pictorialist photographers Victor Matson (1895–1972) and Otis Williams (1888–1962), both Southern Californians, were also painters. Matson was active with the 'Camera Pictorialists of Los Angeles' for several decades and Williams had a number of photographic exhibits in Los Angeles in the 1920s. The camera pictorialist movement lasted for many years in California and so it consisted of photographers who worked in the Tonalist tradition as well as those who favored greater contrast and a more precise focus. Anne Brigman (1869–1950) was a pioneering Northern California photographer who was known for her Tonalist photographs of nude figures in dramatic landscape settings. She began taking photographs about 1901 and was soon considered one of the leaders of the Pictorialist movement in the San Francisco Bay area. She corresponded with Alfred Stieglitz and her work was included in his legendary journal Camera Work and she was listed as a member of the Photo-Secession.

=== California Pictorialist Photography exhibitions ===
There has been a revival of interest in Camera Pictorialism in California and a number of museum exhibitions have been mounted and books published. Getty Publications, an offshoot of the J. Paul Getty Museum published Pictorialism in California, Photographs 1900–1940 in 1994. The Santa Barbara Museum of Art hosted both Lost and Found: Japanese American Photographs from the Dennis Reed Collection and Art Lost and Found: California Pictorialist Photographs from the Dennis Reed Collection in 2006.

== California Tonal Impressionism ==
Harry Muir Kurtzworth, who was Fine Art Curator for the Los Angeles County Museum of History, Art and Architecture from 1930 to 1932 seems to be the first one to establish the term Tonal Impressionism which he used to describe paintings done in the Tonalist manner with simplified compositions, a limited but which utilized the brighter, more chromatic palette of Impressionism. He titled an exhibition he curated "Tonal Impressionism." This was held at the Los Angeles Art Association Gallery at the Los Angeles Central Library in June 1937. The artists he included were Charles Bensco, Frank Tolles Chamberlin, Alson Clark, Clyde Forsyth, Ralph Holmes, Thodore Lukits, J. Mason Reeves, and Seymour Thomas. Kurtzworth's concept was that these painters painted subjects that the Tonalists would have favored, but by painting with a palette without the earth tones many of the earlier painters used, the result became quite different. The large body of work the California artist Theodore Lukits did in the pastel medium or the hundreds of moonlit scenes painted by the Western painter Frank Tenney Johnson, may best exemplify this approach. These artists both painted nocturnes, but they are dominated by a blue palette, clearly derived from the colored shadows of Impressionism.

=== California Tonalism Exhibitions ===
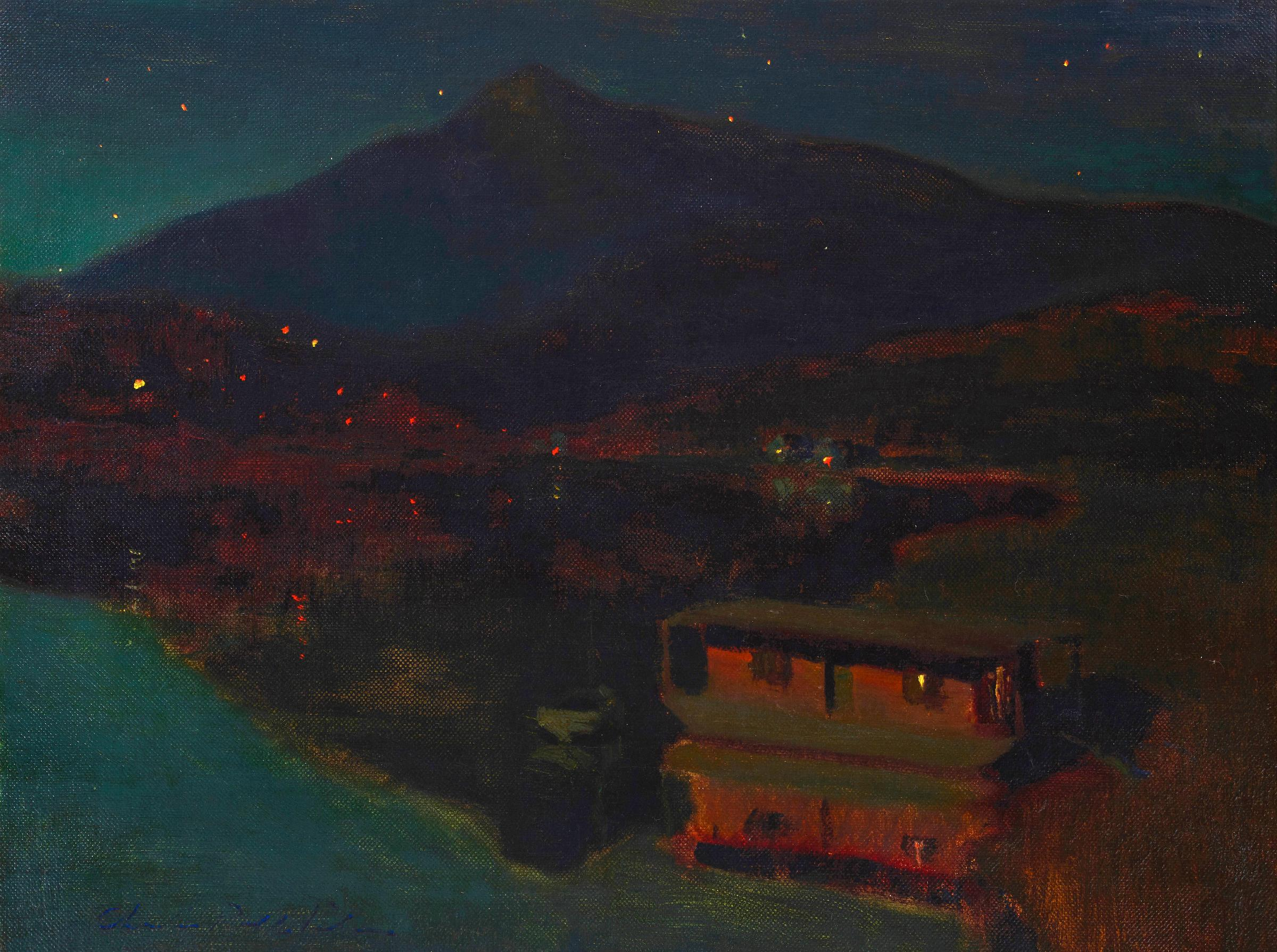
Charles Rollo Peters, Houseboats in Belvedere, oil on canvas, 19 x 25 1/4 in.

Although the term Tonalism was in common usage earlier in the century to describe "mood" painters, it seems to have reemerged in 1972 when the art historian Wanda Corn curated the exhibition "The Color of Mood:American Tonalism, 1880–1910" at the DeYoung Museum in San Francisco. This exhibition was accompanied by an exhibition catalog that laid out the history of American Tonalism and connected a wide range of artists and photographers as having similar motivations and as being part of the same movement. It has been described as a "landmark" exhibition in the art historical media. Nancy Moure explored the origins of art in Los Angeles in a 1995 exhibition, "Loners, Mavericks & Dreamers, Art in Los Angeles before 1900", for the Laguna Art Museum, which covered Southern California Tonalism.

Perhaps the most important exhibition on California Tonalism was "Twilight and Reverie: California Tonalist Painting, 1890–1930" which was curated by Harvey Jones for the Oakland Museum of California in 1995. While a number of California painters had been recognized as Tonalists and included in different exhibitions, this show was limited to works done in and of California. Works by George Inness, William Keith, Maurice Del Mue, Sydney J. Yard, Granville Redmond, Charles Rollo Peters, Eugen Neuhaus, Giuseppe Cadenasso, Will Sparks, Arthur Mathews and Lucia Matthews, Arthur Atkins, and Gottardo Piazzoni were included.

== See also ==
- American Impressionism
- California Plein-Air Painting
- En plein air
