= Solliday =

Solliday is a surname. Notable people with the surname include:

- Albert Solliday (1841–1924), American dentist, soldier and politician
- Tim Solliday (born 1952), American painter
