= Peter Seitz Adams =

American artist (born 1950)

- Born: August 27, 1950; Beverly Hills, California, U.S.
- Education: Instituto de Bellas Artes San Miguel de Allende, Otis College of Art and Design
- Known for: Landscape painting, portrait painting, still life, figurative works
- Movement: California Plein-Air Painting
- Awards: Gold Medal, 98th Annual CAC annual Exhibition; President, California Art Club

Peter Seitz Adams (born August 27, 1950) is an American artist. His body of work focuses on landscapes and seascapes created en plein air in oil or pastel as well as enigmatic figure and still-life paintings. He is noted for his colorful, high-key palette and broad brushwork. Adams has held numerous solo and group exhibitions in galleries and museums, including throughout California, the Western United States, and on the East Coast in Philadelphia, Vermont, and New York. Adams is the longest serving President of the California Art Club (f. 1909) and has served on its board of directors in Pasadena, California from 1993 to 2018. He is also a writer on subjects relating to historic artists for the California Art Club Newsletter, as well as for a number of the organization's exhibition catalogs.

== Family and personal background ==
Peter Adams' mother, Mary Seitz Adams (1917–2004), was a socially active homemaker and his father, James H. Adams, also known as Peter Adams, Sr., was a businessman by vocation, and an actor by avocation. Peter Adams, Sr. appeared in Hollywood epic films, such as Bullwhip, Omar Khayyam, The Big Fisherman, Jailhouse Rock and the television series Zorro. His maternal grandfather was the playwright and Hollywood movie director George B. Seitz (1888–1944). Adams has two older sisters, Mary Adams O’Connell, who is a businesswoman and Aileen Adams Cowan, who is a former Secretary of State for Consumer Affairs for the State of California and an Assistant Attorney General in the Clinton Administration. Adams grew up in Beverly Hills and attended Harvard Boys School (now Harvard-Westlake School). He is married to Elaine Shelby (Shelbi) Adams, a former stockbroker who has managed the California Art Club in addition to Adams' career since 1993. The Adams' live in a home that has been described as an eclectic mixture of Chinese furniture and Antiques, some significant works by his teacher Theodore Lukits as well as a broad selection of some of his own works chosen by his wife. The Adams have constructed elaborate waterfalls and pools, as well as walls and walkways made of river stones around their Pasadena property. Peter Adams' studio features a high-pitched roof that allows him to work on large paintings and glassed shelves housing a collection of art books. He is an avid outdoorsman who hikes in the San Gabriel Mountains with his border collies and makes painting trips to the Sierra Nevada (U.S.). He is a public speaker and raconteur.

== Early art studies ==
Adams was initially drawn to traditional, representational art. As a young man, he collected adventure books from the "Golden Age" of American illustration. He credits these romantic tales, illustrated by artists like Howard Pyle, N.C. Wyeth and Dean Cornwell, with not only inspiring his art but interesting him in the world beyond the shores of America. Adams wanted to learn how to paint like the turn-of-the-century painters did, but he couldn't keep up with the curriculum at the Instituto de Bellas Artes in San Miguel de Allende, Mexico (1969), Otis Art Institute and Art Center School (1970). In 1970 he was introduced to Theodore Lukits (1897–1992), a well-known painter of portraits, still lifes and landscapes who had been teaching in Los Angeles since 1924.

== Studies with Theodore Lukits ==
Peter Adams entered the atelier of Lukits in 1970. Adams has described entering the Lukits studio, which was lined with plaster casts of Roman and Greek sculpture, student’s drawings and Chinese antiques "like walking into another century” because the Lukits Atelier resembled those of the 19th-century Parisian painters' he admired. Adams was to study with Lukits for seven years and eventually he became his apprentice, but like all of Lukits' new students, he began by "drawing from the antique," doing charcoal or graphite portraits of marbles and plaster casts of ancient Roman and Greek statuary. These studies taught Adams to understand the tonal gradations of light and shadow. Advancement in a traditional atelier is based on mastery, so Adams moved from working from plaster casts to simple still life set-ups only after his instructor was satisfied with his work.

As a culmination of his graphite work, Adams did a series of still-life drawings of Asian antiques that set the direction for the still-life works of his professional career. Eventually, he began to work in color, painting still-life set-ups under the colored lights that Lukits used to simulate conditions an artist might find in the outdoors. He subsequently attended Lukits' anatomy and life drawing classes. Adams also began painting “En plein air”, directly from the landscape. He painted with Arny Karl (1940–2000), a fellow Lukits student, who had already been painting out of doors for a number of years. Using the pastel medium, the two went on plein air trips to the local foothills in the San Gabriel Mountains, beaches, and trips to St. Malo, near Oceanside, where the Adams family owned a beach house. Karl and Adams also made extended trips to the American and Canadian National Parks, traveling as far north as the Canadian Rockies. By the mid-1970s, they were joined by another fellow Lukits student, Tim Solliday (b. 1952). Together, the three artists traveled and painted en plein air using the pastel medium, as their teacher Theodore Lukits had done in the 1920s and 1930s.

== Professional career ==
Adams began painting professionally around 1980. He was first represented by the Greg Juarez Gallery in Beverly Hills. Run by the collector, philanthropist, and 9th-generation Californian Gregg Juarez, the Juarez Gallery represented Adams for a number of years. Next, he moved to the Adamson-Duvannes Gallery in West Hollywood, California. Jerome Adamson was an art collector who had purchased this historic gallery. He represented Adams for a number of years and mounted Adams' large exhibitions of works from Asia and Afghanistan. In 1992, Adams began to exhibit his work with the Morseburg Galleries in West Hollywood. There he participated in a long series of group exhibitions which included the older painter Richard Rackus (b. 1922), as well as two of his friends from the Lukits Atelier, Arny Karl (1940–2000) and Tim Solliday (b. 1952). These exhibitions emphasized plein-air landscape painting. Adams participated in a number of pastel shows along with Solliday, Karl, Gil Dellinger, Rich Hilker and Clark Mitchell. In 2003 his wife Elaine Adams opened American Legacy Fine Arts, a private art gallery developed on the first floor of Peter Adams’ studio and began promoting her husband’s work as well as other artists in Los Angeles.

== Artistic influences ==
Inspired by a broad spectrum of artists in the classical art tradition, however, Adams cites Theodore Lukits, his teacher and mentor, as providing him with the direct link to the art ateliers of Paris and to the 19th century academicians he admires, such as William-Adolphe Bouguereau (1825–1905) and Jean-Léon Gérôme (1824–1904). Like most Plein-Air painters he also cites the Spanish Impressionist Joaquin Sorolla (1863–1923) and the Swedish painter of figures in outdoor settings Anders Zorn (1860–1920) as having an impact on his work. However, in contrast to many painters steeped in the Plein-Air tradition, the course of Adams' life and career has been influenced by the Orientalists, the French, British and American painters who ventured to the Middle East in the 19th century, painting the "exotic" people who populated lands that were unfamiliar to them. He includes John Frederick Lewis (1804–1876) Sir David Roberts (1796–1864), Frederick Arthur Bridgman (1847-19280 and Edwin Lord Weeks (1849–1903) as painters who made him curious to explore remote lands and get to known distant peoples. Adams designs and constructs his paintings differently from most painters and he has been influenced in completely different ways by the English painter, illustrator, printmaker and muralist Sir Frank Brangwyn (1857–1956) and the Art Nouveau painter and muralist Alphonse Mucha (1860–1939). From Mucha, he learned about swirling, moving, compositions and curvilinear line. From Brangwyn he learned about the juxtaposition of interesting shapes.

== Assessment and oeuvre ==
While Adams considers himself a traditionalist and a representational painter, he is considered to be an innovative colorist and because of his interest in unusual effects of light, natural wonders and underground geological formations. Early in his career, his work consisted of Plein Air pastels and oils of the Eucalyptus trees, bridges and foothills around Pasadena. In addition, he created a series of beach scenes with figures centered on St. Malo Beach near Oceanside. The works he created on his extended trips to Asia were primarily figurative in the quick-drying tempera media to sketch, later, completing a series of larger works for his exhibitions back in America. Art historian and former Chief Curator of the Southern Alleghenies Museum of Art, Michael Tomor, described Adams' pastel work in an essay for the exhibition Contemporary Romanticism: Landscapes in Pastel as being "Inspired by the brilliant colors, atmospheric perspective, and scenic grandeur of the great 19th century Romanticists, Peter Adams, a student of Theodore Lukits in the 1970s, conveys the magical shimmer of light in ephemeral sunsets and the tranquility of the sea." As his teacher Lukits did in the 1920s, Adams painted in the Sierra Nevada (U.S.) during the summer and winter when atmospheric conditions were more intense. By the mid-1990s, while its origins remained out of doors, his work was becoming more stylized, showing the unmistakable influence of Art Nouveau. As he reached middle age, Adams began to do large works of unusual natural formations, geysers and pools in Yellowstone National Park or stalactites in Carlsbad Caverns in New Mexico. In recent years he had returned to the human figure as a subject, often combining fantasy and reality in his works, as he has done in a series of recent works centered on the story of Wagner's Ring of the Nibelung and the Los Angeles Ring Festival mounted by the Los Angeles Opera.

== Revival of the California Art Club ==
By the early 1990s, Adams and his friends saw the need for an organization that could help to bring order to the reemerging traditional art movement in California. Adams accepted the Presidency of the California Art and he has remained at its helm to the present. In order to reorganize the California Art Club, Adams began to recruit most of the active professional landscape and figurative painters and sculptors that he knew. The core group of artists that became members of the reorganized California Art Club was primarily students of Theodore Lukits or the Russian landscape and figurative painter Sergei Bongart (1918–1985).

== Organization of California Art Club special exhibitions ==
Under the leadership of Peter Adams and his wife, Elaine Adams, the California Art Club began organizing a series of thematic exhibitions at both art and natural history museums. The Adams' saw that there was a natural relationship between landscape art and ecological awareness and natural history. In 1996, the California Art Club organized the California Wetlands Exhibition at the Natural History Museum in historic Exposition Park in Los Angeles. In May through August 1998, the California Art Club mounted Treasures of the Sierra Nevada at the Natural History Museum of Los Angeles County, featuring works by historic California artists including Edgar Alwin Payne (1883–1947), Jack Wilkinson Smith and Theodore Lukits as well as contemporary painters. The Carnegie Museum in Oxnard, California hosted a large exhibition of works by painters from the California Art Club in 1994 titled The California Art Club: 85 Years of Art where Adams' work was featured prominently. In 1997 Peter and Elaine Adams and the California Art Club organized a traveling exhibition which contrasted the work of American Impressionists and Classical Realist painters from the East Coast and the Midwest United States with the California Impressionists. Titled East Coast Ideals, West Coast Concepts, the exhibition traveled from the Carnegie Museum in Oxnard to the Springville Museum of Art in Springville, Utah to the Academy of Art College in San Francisco. Among the historic artists represented were William McGregor Paxton and R.H.Ives Gammell (1893–1981), representing the Boston School and Theodore Lukits and Maurice Braun (1877–1941) representing the California Impressionists. In 1999, the California Art began a long relationship with the Frederick R. Weisman Museum of Art at Pepperdine University in Malibu with the exhibition titled On Location in Malibu. The exhibition, organized and curated by the Weisman's Michael Zakian, ran from May 22 to August 7, featuring the work of Adams along with dozens of CAC painters.

== Exhibitions and collections ==
Adams has exhibited in numerous museums, including the Pasadena Museum of California Art, Autry Museum of the American West, Southern Alleghenies Museum of Art, Forbes Galleries, Bergstrom-Mahler Museum, Portsmouth Museum, Courthouse Gallery, National Cowboy and Western Heritage Museum, Northwest Museum of Arts and Culture, Museum of the Southwest, Buffalo Bill Historical Center, Museum of Texas Tech University, George Bush Presidential Library, Hillsdale College, Haggin Museum, Springville Museum of Art, Colorado History Museum, Frederick R. Weisman Museum of Art, Frye Art Museum, the Newington-Cropsey Foundation, Natural History Museum of Los Angeles County and Carnegie Museum of Art. He has held solo exhibitions at the Pacific Asia Museum and Carnegie Art Museum, as well as numerous commercial venues.

Among the public collections in which Adams' work is represented are the Carnegie Art Museum, Cathedral of Our Lady of the Angels, Forbes Magazine Collection, Haggin Museum, Pacific Asia Museum, Pasadena Museum of California, Southern Alleghenies Museum of Art and Our Savior Parish & USC Caruso Catholic Center.

In 2007 he received a Gold Medal in the California Art Club Gold Medal Exhibition, and in 2004 he was nominated for Visual Artist of the Year by the International Biographical Center, Cambridge, England.

In addition to his affiliation with the California Art Club, Adams has served on the boards of the American Society of Classical Realism, American Society of Portrait Artists, and served several years on the board of directors of the Pacific Asia Museum and the Pasadena Museum of California Art. Adams is a Signature Member of the California Art Club, Oil Painters of America, Pastel Society of America, and the Plein Air Painters of America.

== See also ==
- American Impressionism
- Atelier method
- Autry National Center for Western Heritage
- California Art Club
- California Plein-Air Painting
- Decorative Impressionism
- En plein air
- Arny Karl
- Landscape art
- Theodore Lukits
- Tim Solliday
- Tonal Impressionism
