= California Club =

- The California Club
- U.S. National Register of Historic Places
- Los Angeles Historic-Cultural Monument
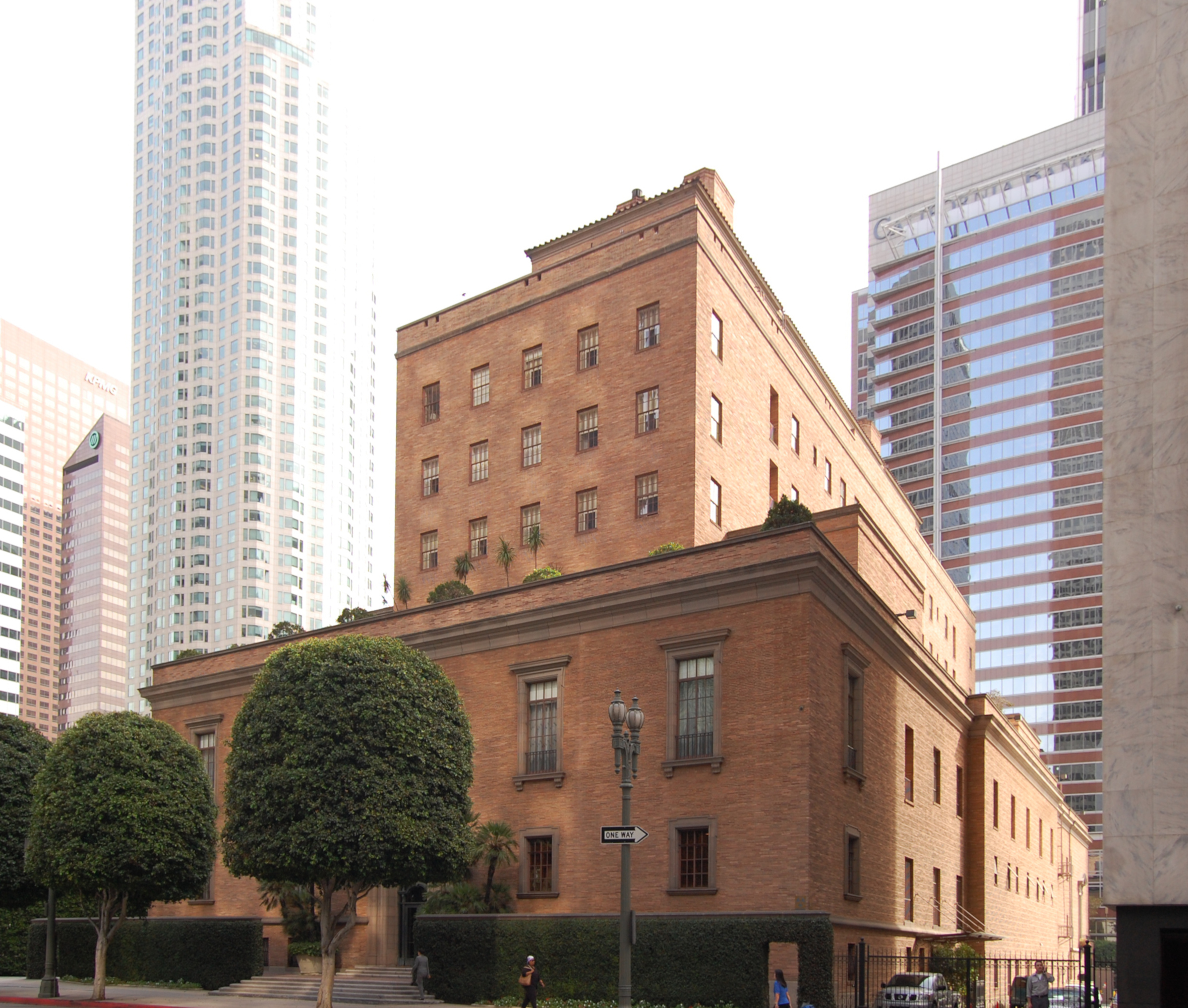

- Location within California
- Location: 538 S Flower St, Los Angeles, California
- Coordinates: 34°3′1″N 118°15′23.1″W
- Area: Less than 1 acre (0.40 ha)
- Built: 1929–1930
- Architect: Robert D. Farquhar
- Architectural style: Italian Renaissance Revival
- Website: https://californiaclub.org/
- NRHP reference No.: 10000425
- LAHCM No.: 43

Significant dates
- Added to NRHP: July 6, 2010
- Designated LAHCM: November 2, 1966

The California Club is an invitation-only private club established in 1888, based in Los Angeles, California.

According to the Los Angeles Times, "The people who run Los Angeles belong to the Jonathan Club; the people who own Los Angeles belong to the California Club."

In April 2005, the club was ranked #13 in the "Centrality Rankings" by UC Santa Cruz sociologist G. William Domhoff in his research about social clubs, policy-planning groups, corporations, and ruling-class cohesiveness.

The club is also ranked as the third most exclusive private club in the United States.

== Organizational history ==
The California Club was incorporated on December 24, 1888. The first organizational meeting was held September 24, 1887, with N.C. Coleman as chairman and H.T. DeWilson as secretary.

"The constitution and bylaws of the Union Social Club, of San Francisco, was reported and accepted without any change by the body of gentlemen assembled. There was considerable discussion on the ... name of the club, and ... it was decided to call it the California Club, of Los Angeles. The section in the bylaws granting army and navy officers all the privileges of members upon half-rate caused considerable feeling among the members. Four votes were taken on the question, and at last it was decided to allow the bylaws to read as they have for twenty-five years in the Union Club."

The club's first location was in the second-floor rooms over the Tally-Ho Stables on the northwest corner of First and Fort (Broadway) streets, where the Los Angeles County Law Library now stands. It moved to the Wilcox Building on the southeast corner of Second and Spring streets in 1895, occupying the two top floors, the fourth and fifth. The building was the first in Los Angeles to have two elevators—one for the public and the other for members. The men's dining room, reading room, bar and lounge were on the top floor. On the floor below was the ladies' dining room.

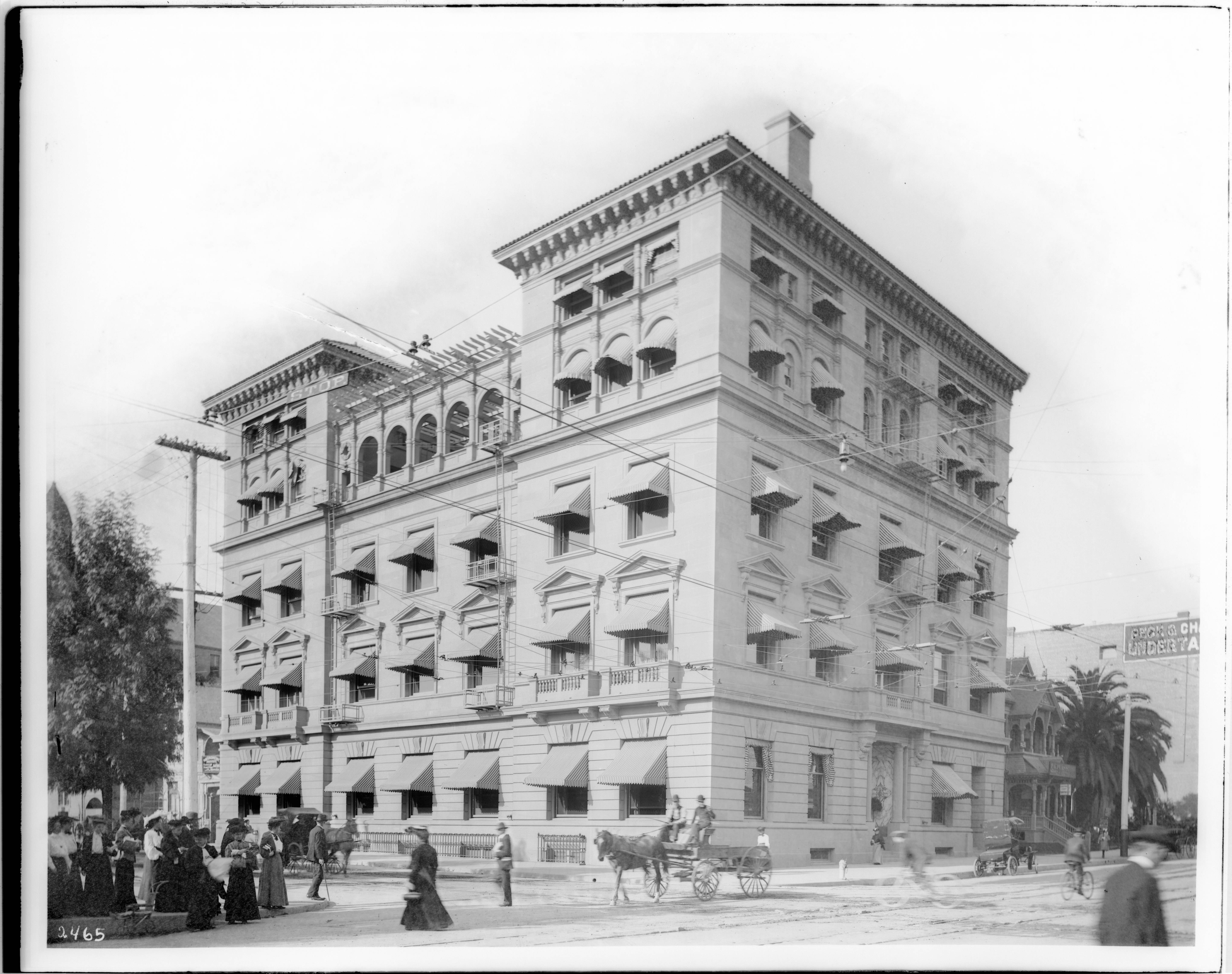
Exterior street view of the former five-story California Club clubhouse on Fifth Street and Hill Street. 1905–1907

The club stayed in the Wilcox Building for a decade before moving because of its growing membership. In 1904, the club's headquarters moved to a five-story building on Fifth and Hill streets.

At various times in its history, the California Club was accused of discrimination against women, African Americans, Jews, and other minorities, even though founding members included Mexicans and Jews. The California Club did not admit African Americans or women until the 1980s. In 1982, Prince Philip declined to attend the club because of its discrimination policy. In a vote taken in June 1987, 90 percent of the voting members favored admitting women. In addition, the Los Angeles City Council in May 1987 voted, 12–0, to ban discriminatory practices at institutions in Los Angeles like the California Club. Since that time, the Club has maintained a non-discriminatory policy for admission to membership. Its first black member, Dr. Joseph Alexander, was admitted in 1988.

== The current clubhouse ==
The current seven-story clubhouse was completed on August 25, 1930, after construction was started in late 1928. The building was designed by Robert D. Farquhar, an architect trained at the École des Beaux-Arts in Paris. The American Institute of Architects awarded Farquhar the Distinguished Honor Award for the design of the California Club building.

According to the National Park Service:

"The structure is considered one of the most important buildings of the architect Robert D. Farquhar. Built in 1930, The Italian Renaissance Revival style building, with its setbacks and tower, was among the largest buildings in the immediate area when the site was chosen. Elements like the private forecourt, which partially shields the front entrance and first floor, provides the club with a sense of privacy and understated design."

The building was listed on the U.S. National Register of Historic Places on July 6, 2010. The listing was featured in the National Park Service's weekly list of July 16, 2010.

In addition to antiques and handcrafted furniture, the clubhouse is decorated with a collection of Western-themed, plein air paintings by such American landscape painters as J. Bond Francisco, Elmer Wachtel, Franz A. Bischoff, George Kennedy Brandriff, William Wendt and Paul Lauritz.

== See also ==
- List of American gentlemen's clubs
- Membership discrimination in California social clubs
