= Edan Milton Hughes =

American art dealer (1935–2015)

- Born: June 4, 1935; Maysville, Kentucky
- Died: April 21, 2015 (aged 79); San Francisco, California, U.S.
- Occupations: art dealer, art collector, author

Edan Milton Hughes (June 4, 1935 – April 21, 2015) was an American art dealer and collector of California art. He wrote the definitive work on California artists.

== Life ==
Edan Milton Hughes was born June 4, 1935, in Maysville, Kentucky. He attended the University of Kentucky, where his studies were interrupted by the Korean War. The Navy first brought him to San Francisco as a young man, where he remained till his death.

During the period of the 1960s and 1970s in San Francisco he lived in the Haight-Ashbury section of the city.

Hughes enjoyed playing bridge, and going to the Opera. He was not married and had no children, but enjoyed a vast group of friends in the San Francisco Bay Area and beyond. He died in San Francisco on April 21, 2015.

== Career ==
Hughes first settled in San Francisco when the Navy brought him there after the war. He was an avid dancer, and found work as a dance instructor, and as a hair stylist in some of the principal San Francisco hotels.

He sometimes worked as an assistant to rock promoter Bill Graham and met many of the main rock groups and personalities of the time, including members of the Rolling Stones, Creedence, Carlos Santana, Led Zeppelin, Jimi Hendrix, Jefferson Airplane, the Grateful Dead, and the Mamas and the Papas.

He also worked in real estate for several years, an activity which brought him into contact with some of the fine art from the state of California which started a lifelong passion. At the time, there was little interest in such art, and he was able to procure many canvases from some of the best artists, unrecognized at the time, for a pittance. This formed the basis of what became a vast collection of California art. His apartment was covered chock-a-block with California paintings, with many others stacked up with wall space left to show it.

His interest as a collector, along with an increasing recognition of the value of California art, combined to turn Hughes into an art dealer of California art of the first order. He also published his monumental reference work "Artists in California, 1786-1940" in 1986 with biographies of over 20,000 California artists, and this work along with Hughes' collection and dealership helped bring California art to the notice of the art world. The Crocker Art Museum in Sacramento took an interest, and helped organize and publish revised editions of the work, which is universally recognized as the definitive work in its field.

== Publications ==
Hughes is the author of Artists in California, 1786-1940 (1986). The first edition was published in 1986, and received so many follow up inquiries that he decided to produce a second edition with double the amount of content. The third edition is a biographical dictionary which contains information on over 20,000 Californian artists.

== See also ==
- California Impressionism
- Early California artists
