= Will Sparks (painter) =

American painter (1862-1937)

- Born: February 7, 1862; St. Louis, Missouri, U.S.
- Died: March 31, 1937 (aged 75); San Francisco, California, U.S.
- Education: St. Louis School of Fine Arts; Académie Julian; Académie Colarossi
- Occupation: Painter
- Spouse: Ethel Martin

Will Sparks (February 7, 1862 – March 31, 1937) was an American painter. He painted the adobe buildings of Spanish missions in California, Arizona and New Mexico, with a focus on colors and nocturnes.

== Early life ==
Will Sparks was born on February 7, 1862, in St. Louis, Missouri. He first studied medicine and passed his exams, but he decided to become a painter instead. He was educated at the St. Louis School of Fine Arts, the Académie Julian and the Académie Colarossi.

== Career ==
Sparks began his career in the art department of The Cincinnati Enquirer. While he was in Paris, he sketched body parts for Louis Pasteur. Upon his return to the United States, he pursued his artistic career in Denver, Colorado, and he subsequently settled in San Francisco, California.

Sparks painted the bluffs of Santa Catalina Island and the landscape of Niles Canyon as well old windmills in Mexico. However, most of his work consisted of the adobe buildings of the Spanish missions in California, Arizona and New Mexico. He used plenty of colors in his paintings. He also did many nocturnes.

Sparks was a co-founder of the Hotel Del Monte Art Gallery in Monterey, California in 1907. Philanthropist Alma de Bretteville Spreckels owned 37 of his paintings.

== Personal life and death ==
Sparks was married to Ethel Martin. He was a member of the Bohemian Club. He died at St Mary's Hospital in San Francisco on March 31, 1937.
