= John Englehart =

American painter

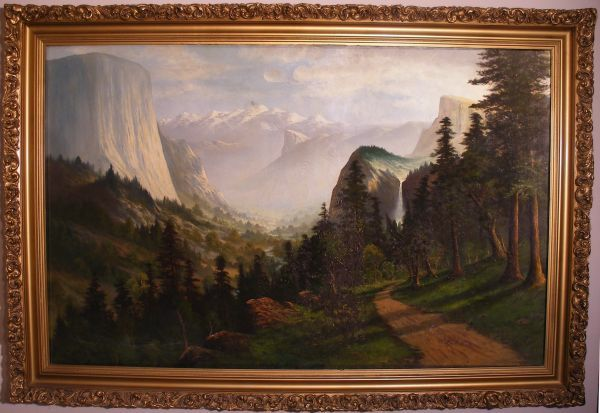
- Yosemite Valley — by John Englehart, signed as C. N. Doughty, 1908.
- Born: Joseph John Englehart (?); June 14, 1867
- Died: April 14, 1915 (aged 47)
- Movement: Realism

John Englehart or Joseph John Englehart (1867–1915), was an American landscape painter who worked under a number of pseudonyms. Englehart was born on June 14, 1867, in Chicago, Illinois, and died on April 14, 1915, in Oakland, California.

== Pseudonyms ==
John Englehart's numerous variant spellings and pseudonyms include:

- Joseph John Englehart, Joseph John Engelhart, J. Englehart, J. Engelhart, J. Englehardt, J. Engelhardt, and Emblhart.
- C. N. Doughty, C. C. Foucks, C. Williams, C. L. Willis, W. L. Willis, J. Cole, J. Delane, J. Enright, J. Gran, J. Grant, J. Hart, J. Lang, J. L. Monahan, Wm. J. Schon, and Ed Shroder.

== Career ==
Englehart documented America's Western landscape and frontier during the late 19th and early 20th centuries. He was known for his landscape oil paintings of California and the Pacific Northwest.

The style of landscape paintings by Englehart never brought the critical acclaim given to his contemporary landscape painters, such as those of the Hudson River School, including Albert Bierstadt and Thomas Moran. However he was successful as an artist, and his works are included in the collections of several museums.

=== California ===
John Englehart's career started during the popular 'California landscape paintings' period of the latter 19th-century. From the late 1880s until the turn of the century he maintained a studio in San Francisco on Clay Street. During those prosperous years he commuted to work from a residence across the San Francisco Bay in Oakland. He painted scenes of California, including various views of Yosemite Valley.

"The wealth generated (in California) by the Gold Rush, the railroads, the Comstock Lode, banking, and commerce, created a very favorable climate for artists. People like the Stanfords, the Crockers, the Hopkins, and the rest of San Francisco society were buying art. Landscape paintings of famous places in the West were eagerly bought, and the current doings of the artists, where they were now and what they were painting, was duly reported in the papers and periodicals."

— William C. Miesse, from Siskiyous.edu: The San Francisco Art Boom, Mount Shasta as a Visual Resource

=== Pacific Northwest ===
Tacoma

In the late 1890s Englehart traveled and painted in the Pacific Northwest. He did many landscapes of the Tacoma, Washington area during this period.

Portland

In 1902, after San Francisco's art patrons' taste had moved on to European art, he opened a studio in Portland, Oregon. He spent a large part of his time there until 1904. He participated in the Lewis and Clark Centennial Exposition in 1905.

In 1909, he was awarded a prize for a landscape painting in a New York exhibit.

=== San Francisco Bay area ===
By 1910 Englehart had returned to the Bay Area, where he resided in Alameda near Oakland, until his death on April 14, 1915.

== Realism style ==
John Englehart's style was Realism, focusing on being illustrative and descriptive. He did not emphasize an evocative or romantic style, such as Thomas Hill did, to paint "Not as it is, but as it ought to be." Englehart's landscape compositions had a goal to bring the viewer closer to an actual experience of 'being there.' For most of his paintings he avoided effets de soir, choosing the midday light over the 'romantic light' of sunrise and sunset. He also incorporated multiple viewpoints in his paintings to depict the scene.

== See also ==
- California Tonalism
- Luminism (American art style)
- Realism (arts)
- American realism
- Romanticism (arts)

== Selected works ==
Picture	Subject	Englehart's Signator	Inches inc. org. frame	Price	Auction House
	Yosemite	signed as J. Englehart	64x44	$19,120	2004 Christies
	Yosemite	signed as Ed Shroder	53x31	$10,158	2006 Bonhams
	Yosemite	signed as J. J. Englehart	50x30	$7,832	2009 JMoran
	Mining	signed as J. J. Englehardt	?x?	$7,500	2001 O'Gallerie
	Yosemite	signed as J. J. Englehart	46x32	$5,581	2005 Bonhams
	lake	signed as J. Englehardt	50x30	$3,250	2007 O'Gallerie
	Mythical Valley	signed as J. J. Englehart	50x30	$3,000	2001 O'Gallerie
	Mt. Hood	signed as Englehart	50x30	$2,750	2007 O'Gallerie
	Mount Hood, Oregon	signed as J. Englehart	48x30	$2,500	2002 O'Gallerie
	Lake	signed as WM. J. Schon	52x30	$2,040	2008 Bonhams
	Crater Lake, Oregon	signed as J. Englehart	36x26	$2,000	2000 O'Gallerie
	Yosemite	signed as WM Hart	36x18	$1,952	2009 Bonhams
	Mt. Hood, Oregon	signed as J. Englehart	36x22	$1,900	2002 O'Gallerie
	Mt. Hood, Oregon	signed as C. N. Doughty	34x18	$900	2003 O'Gallerie
Picture	Subject	Signature	Size	$Price	Auction; House
Joseph John Englehart's Paintings Sold at Auction

== Museum collections ==
- Oakland Museum of California.
- Washington State Historical Society.
- College of Notre Dame, in Belmont, California.
- De Young Museum, on loan to the Society of California Pioneers, San Francisco.
- Nevada Museum, Reno.
- The historic Baldwin Saloon (large collection), The Dalles, Oregon.

Picture	Subject	Englehart's Signator	Inches inc. org. frame	Museum
Add here	Add here	Signature	Size	Museum
Picture	Subject	Signature	Size	Museum
Joseph John Englehart's Paintings In Museum

== Unrelated artists ==
Englehart used many pseudonyms, however there are other similarly named artists, including:

- Josef Engelhart — European oil painter.
- Charles Montagu Doughty — poet.
- Edna Palmer Engelhardt — oil painter.
- Walter Albert Engelhardt — oil painter.
- LeRoy Updyke (1876–1959) — copied Englehart in paintings for the tourist trade, University Of Washington painting instructor.
