= Tonal Impressionism =

Tonal Impressionism was an artistic style of "mood" paintings with simplified compositions, done in a limited range of colors, as with Tonalist works, but using the brighter, more chromatic palette of Impressionism. An exhibition titled "Tonal Impressionism" was curated by the art historian Harry Muir Kurtzworth for the Los Angeles Art Association Gallery at the Los Angeles Central Library in June 1937 with the works of a number of prominent California artists. In recent years, the term has also been used to describe a non-linear approach to painting where the subject is massed in with tonal values without the use of underdrawing.

== Tonal Impressionism ==
Tonalism is usually characterized by art historians as paintings of simplified subjects, that are painted in a gauzy, indistinct way with a lack of detail, using a limited palette with variations of the same colors. American painters who are considered Tonalists are James Abbott McNeill Whistler (1834–1903), George Inness (1825–1894), Dwight William Tryon (1849–1925), Charles Warren Eaton and often John Twachtman (1853–1922). The French Impressionists adopted a very high key palette that used many of the recently created man made pigments which allowed them to better capture the full intensity of sunlight. The concept of Tonal Impressionism that the art historian Harry Muir Kurtzworth came up with was that artists could work in lower light conditions, in their studio or out of doors in the moonlight, or at sunrise or sunset, at the times of day that the Tonalists favored, but use the palette of Impressionism.

== 1937 Tonal Impressionism Exhibition ==
The first use of this term seems to be in a catalog for an exhibition titled "Tonal Impressionism" which he curated for the Los Angeles Art Association Gallery at the Los Angeles Central Library in June 1937. Kurtzworth, who chose the paintings and wrote the catalog preface stated that: "By tone or tonal painting is meant the feeling of harmony, either in high or low key, brought about by carefully adjusting values and colors, with the result that instead of a brilliant, powerful impression of the atmosphere of subdued light out of doors in the early morning, late afternoon, or a quietly lighted interior is conveyed by the artist's skill."

=== Artists in the Exhibition ===
Harry Muir Kurtzworth selected a number of well known California painters for the June, 1937 exhibition. Hungarian-born Charles Bensco was represented with a single painting, Frank Tolles Chamberlain, a Pasadena painter who had studied with the Tonalist painter Dwight Tyron, had six works, Alson Clark, another Pasadena artist and student of Whistler, had six as well, the San Marino desert painter Clyde Forsyth had two, the Los Angeles painter Ralph Holmes has six, the western painter Frank Tenney Johnson, known as " The Master of Moonlight," had one work, the portrait and landscape painter Theodore Lukits had four, J. Mason Reeves Jr. had six and the La Cresenta portrait painter F. Seymour Thomas had four.

=== Paintings in the Exhibition ===
It is difficult to have a precise idea of what the assembled exhibition would look like because many of the works cannot be located. Frank Tenney Johnson's loan entry was in the possession of a prominent gallery recently, so it is known that it as a moonlit painting of a cowboy smoking a cigarette, a common subject for the artist. Three of the works by Theodore Lukits have been seen in recent years as well. "Idle Hour" was a much exhibited nude depicted in a lowly lit, "smokey" atmospheric interior. This work was frequently exhibited, in the 1920s and 1930s as well as in recent years and is now in the collection of a prominent gallery. The portrait work "Gesture" is a sensual portrait of the artist's wife, done in much higher key, but still with a limited palette. This painting resides in the collection of the Jonathan Art Foundation. "Spirit of the Missions" is a mystical depiction of an apparition of Father Serra in his private garden at Mission San Juan Capistrano seen in a blue moonlight. This work by Lukits surfaced about a decade ago and was exhibited in Father Serra's Garden at the Mission as part of a benefit in 2001. Because of the works we are aware of, it is possible to see what Kurtzworth considered works of "Tonal Impressionism." The moonlights by Theodore Lukits and Frank Tenney Johnson that were in the 1937 exhibition depicted their moonlight scenes enveloped in the blue tones of Impressionism rather than the earth based pigments that would have been used by the artists active in California Tonalism.

== Contemporary term ==
Today, a number of contemporary painters use the term Tonal Impressionism in a different way. The painter Domenic Vignola is one advocate of this approach. These artists use the term Tonal Impressionism to describe an approach by which they paint the figure without drawing, that is without using the brush or charcoal to draw the outlines of the figure or subject in on the canvas. Instead they see the masses as light and dark tones. Essentially, it is a way of using the light, the gradations of light and dark to outline the shape of what the artist is painting rather than line. With this approach, the artist lays in the broadest masses first and then refines the painting as he works, gradually bringing the figure "into focus." Advocates of this method claim that this is the way that historic artists like Titian, Diego Valesquez, John Singer Sargent and Anders Zorn worked. With this type of approach, the higher the contrast, the stronger the line would be between light and dark, where more subtle gradations would result in "lost" edges. If the original usage is still used, then contemporary artists like Dan Pinkham and Peter Seitz Adams could be considered "Tonal Impressionists" Of these two, Pinkham has been heavily influenced by Emil Carlsen and John Twachtman and Adams is a student of Theodore Lukits who was in the original 1937 Los Angeles exhibit.

== See also ==
- Tonalism
- Category: Tonalism - tonalist artists links
- California Plein-Air Painting
- California Art Club
- Early California Artists
- Australian Tonalism
- American Impressionism
- French Impressionism
- Barbizon school
