= Early California artists =

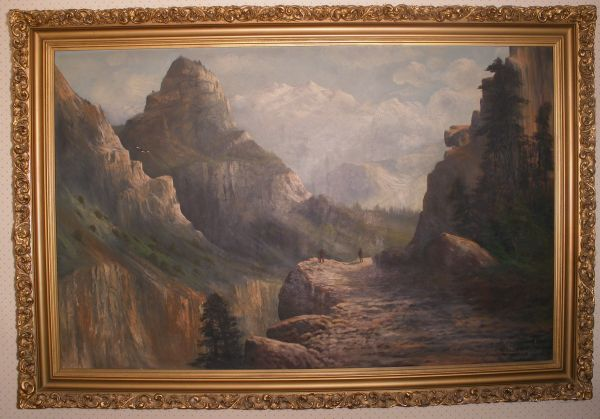
The "Hetch Hetchy Little Arroyo" signed C.N. Doughty, in 1908 and now submerged under a reservoir.

Early California Artists are a subset of American Western artists, painting in the mid-to-late 19th century. Their styles varied from realistic representation to the imagined.

The Early California artists helped shape and create California in culture and politics. Some were members of early survey expeditions of the West, such as Thomas Ayres and Albert Bierstadt. Their eyes, via their art, were the eyes through which the Easterners saw and imagined California and 'The West,' from the renowned early California artists Thomas Hill, William Keith, and Thomas Moran to the populist John Englehart.

== Early art advocacy ==
Their scenic paintings moved U.S. leaders in Washington, D.C., including President Abraham Lincoln. Their visual examples helped define how the United States managed and legislated the territory and then new U.S. state of California, especially represented by the preservation of Yosemite Valley and the Mariposa Grove.

The American artist helped mold the American West by instilling and fanning the eastern population's desire to create an entirely new endeavor, the protection of huge swaths of natural land as parks for use and enjoyment by the public.

Their legacy includes the National Park Service that formed for conservation and the people's benefit, something new in world history. President Abraham Lincoln began the system on June 30, 1864 upon signing The Yosemite Grant, giving California a state park for "public use, resort and recreation".

Populist art of Yosemite helped create and save Yosemite from many attempts at development. "Celebration of Nature" Journalists, Painters and Musicians, formed the Bohemian Club in 1872, and then recruited powerful businessmen and entrepreneurs. They also started the Advocacy group Sierra club in 1892. But John Muir and his artist friends were not able to save Hetch Hetchy Valley, which Muir felt was more stunning than Yosemite.

This frontier was only seen through the eyes of an artist by the average easterner. And the few easterners that had seen it, took back paintings and prose of its breathtaking beauties to evangelize their family and friends on the beauties of the unspoiled west.

The artists were considered to "advertise" the Wonders of Nature, in a way that caused a groundswell of public opinion to protect the most visually stunning areas like Yosemite from development.

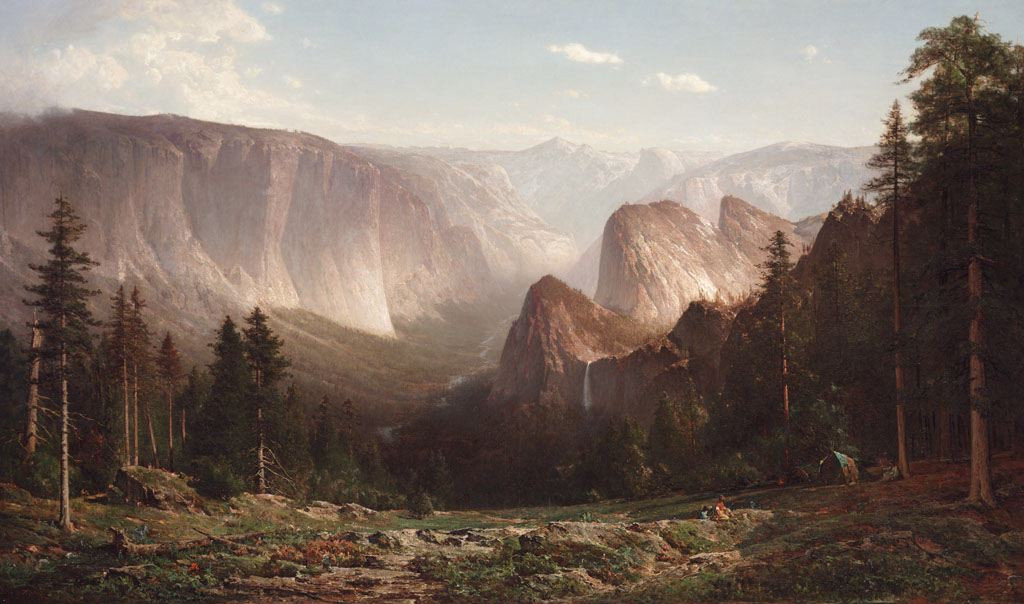
Great Canyon of the Sierra, Yosemite (Thomas Hill)

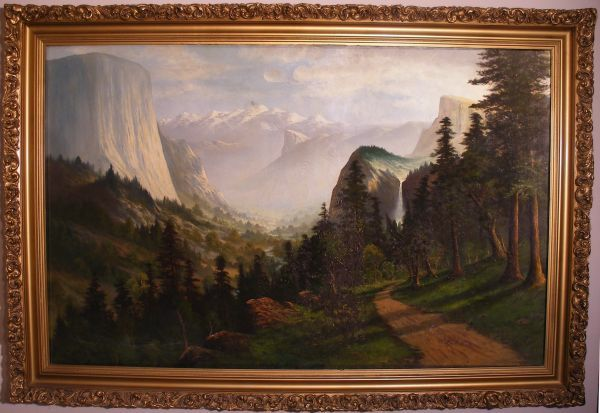
Yosemite Valley (Joseph John Englehart)

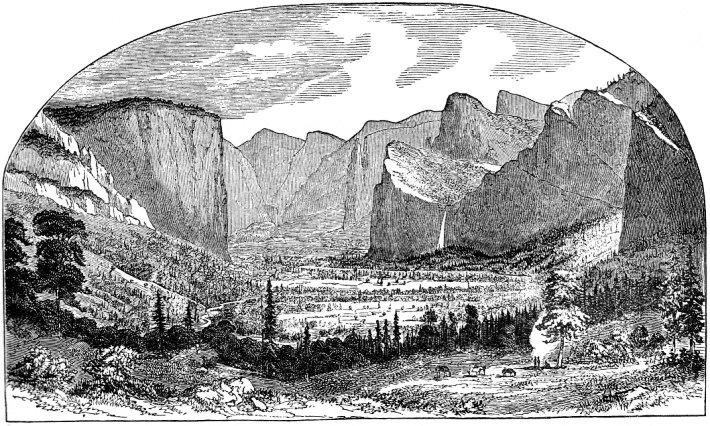
The First Painting of YOSEMITE VALLEY, by Thomas Ayres, 1855

== List of early California artists ==
- Thomas Ayres
- Mary Park Seavey Benton
- Albert Bierstadt
- John Englehart
- Thomas Hill
- George Inness
- William Keith
- Victor Matson
- Thomas Moran

== Distribution ==
Examples of early Californian art can be seen at the following museums.

- Oakland Museum of California
- Crocker Art Museum
- The Huntington Library, Art Collections and Botanical Gardens
- Society of California Pioneers Museum
- Stanford University Museum of Art
