= Mary Park Seavey Benton =

American landscape painter (1815–1910)

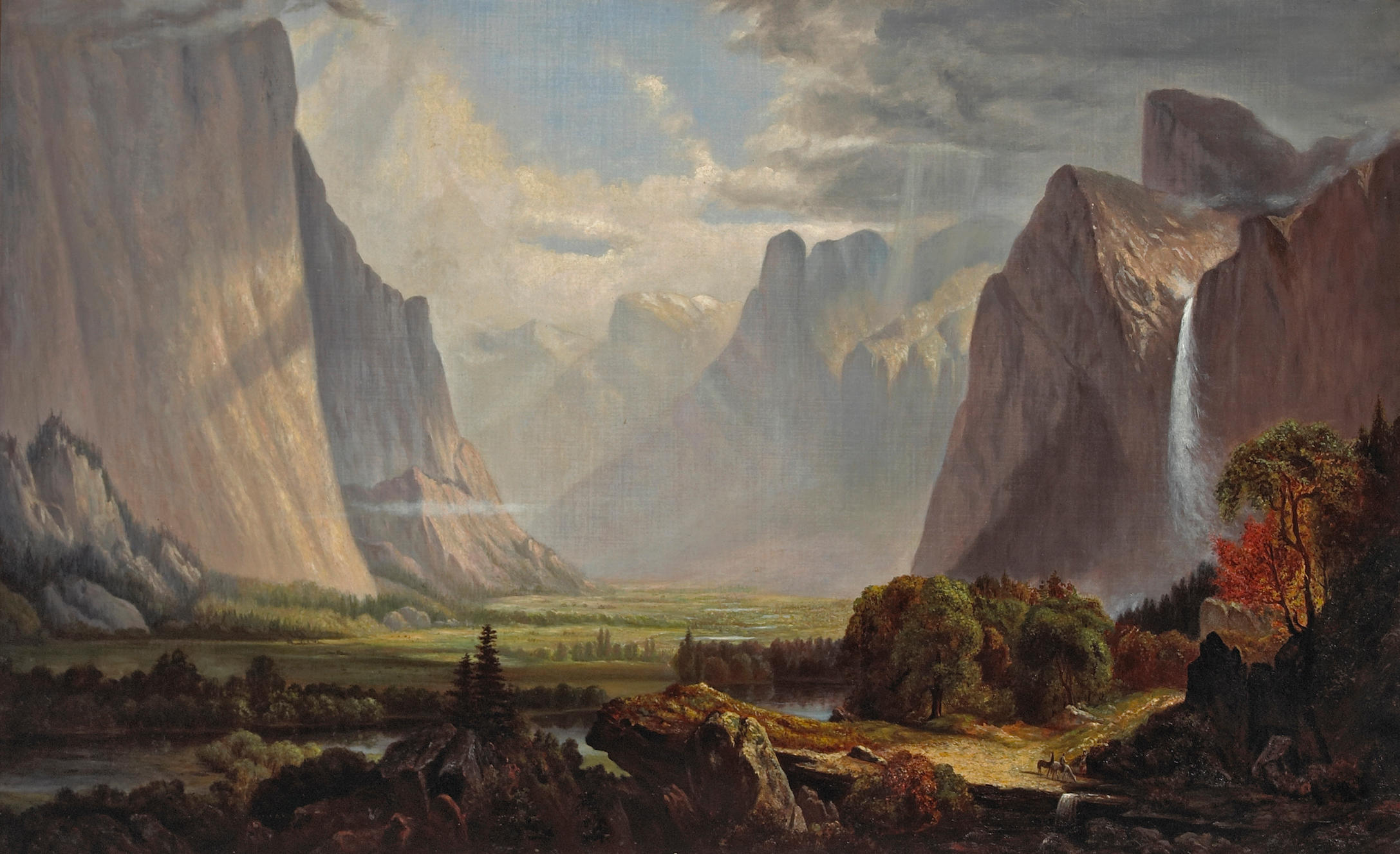
- A View of Yosemite Valley, c. 1855
- Born: August 10, 1815; Boston
- Died: December 6, 1910 (aged 95); Oakland
- Occupation: Painter, watercolorist, oil painter
- Spouse(s): John Eliot Benton

Mary Park Seavey Benton (August 10, 1815 – December 6, 1910) was an American landscape painter and educator. She was one of the first significant female artists in California.

Mary Park Seavey was born on August 10, 1815, in Boston, Massachusetts and grew up in New York. In 1850, she married the Rev. John Eliot Benton, a Congregational clergyman. In 1852, he went to found a Congregational church at the Mission Delores in San Francisco, California. She and their daughter Mary joined them there in 1855. In the 1860s, moved to Sacramento and then Oakland, where John Benton was postmaster and editor of the Oakland Evening Tribune.

Mary Benton trained as an artist from an early age. She opened studios and exhibited in both New York and California, including a number of California state and local fairs. She worked as a teacher in San Francisco and Oakland. She painted numerous landscapes and portraits, including many views of California, primarily of San Francisco and Yosemite.

Mary Park Seavey Benton died on December 6, 1910, in Oakland, California.
