= Thomas Ayres (artist) =

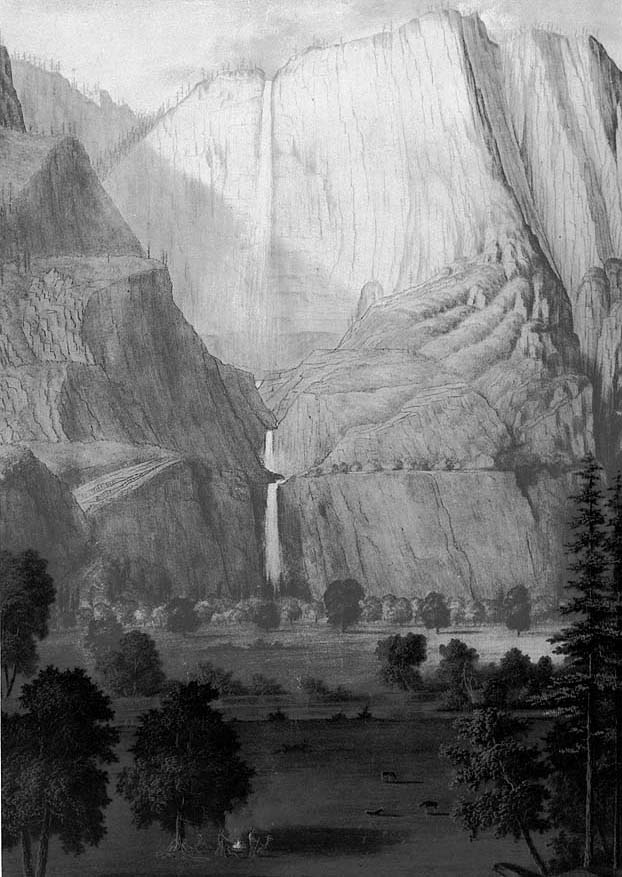
Yosemite Falls, by Thomas Ayres.

Thomas Almond Ayres (c. 1816-1858) was a California gold rush-era artist, most famous for drawing the first rendering of Yosemite Valley to be published and popularized. Ayres was born in Woodbridge, New Jersey in 1816. As a young adult, he moved to Wisconsin Territory and worked as a draftsman in what was to become St. Paul, Minnesota (then still part of Wisconsin Territory). In 1849, he went to California, embarking from New York on the steamship Panama on February 4. As the announcement of gold was only made by President Polk the previous December, this made Ayres among the first to head to the gold fields. He arrived in August, and immediately set out to the diggings. Like many fortune seekers, he was unlucky; however, he spent his time constructively, sketching many gold rush and other California scenes, eventually earning a reputation as a landscape artist.

In 1855, the publisher and promoter James Hutchings conceived the idea of publishing a magazine to popularize California, which he was to call Hutchings' Illustrated California Magazine. Hutchings' motivations were to attract immigrants, as well as to make money on his publications. He invited Ayres to accompany him into the Yosemite, and in June 1855 as the party followed the traditional Indian trail into the valley they stopped at what became known as Inspiration Point so that Ayres could sketch the view, the first such drawing of the valley to be published. For the next five days, Ayres sketched many of the now famous and iconic views of the valley, one per day. Hutchings report of the trip was published in Volume 1 Number 1, and Ayres himself wrote a separate account in the Daily Alta California. In addition to publishing in the magazine, Ayres converted his sketches into a popular panorama displayed at McNulty's Hall in Sacramento.

In 1856, Ayres returned to Yosemite Valley and recorded several more sketches. These he took back east himself and exhibited them at the American Art Union in New York. As a result, Harper & Brothers commissioned him to return to California to gather images for them to publish. In the winter of 1857–1858, after stopping over in San Francisco, Ayres traveled around southern California gathering material. On April 26, 1858, as he was headed back to San Francisco, the passenger ship he was in sunk in a storm off Point Dume. Everyone on the ship perished, and all of the sketches Ayres had brought with him were lost.

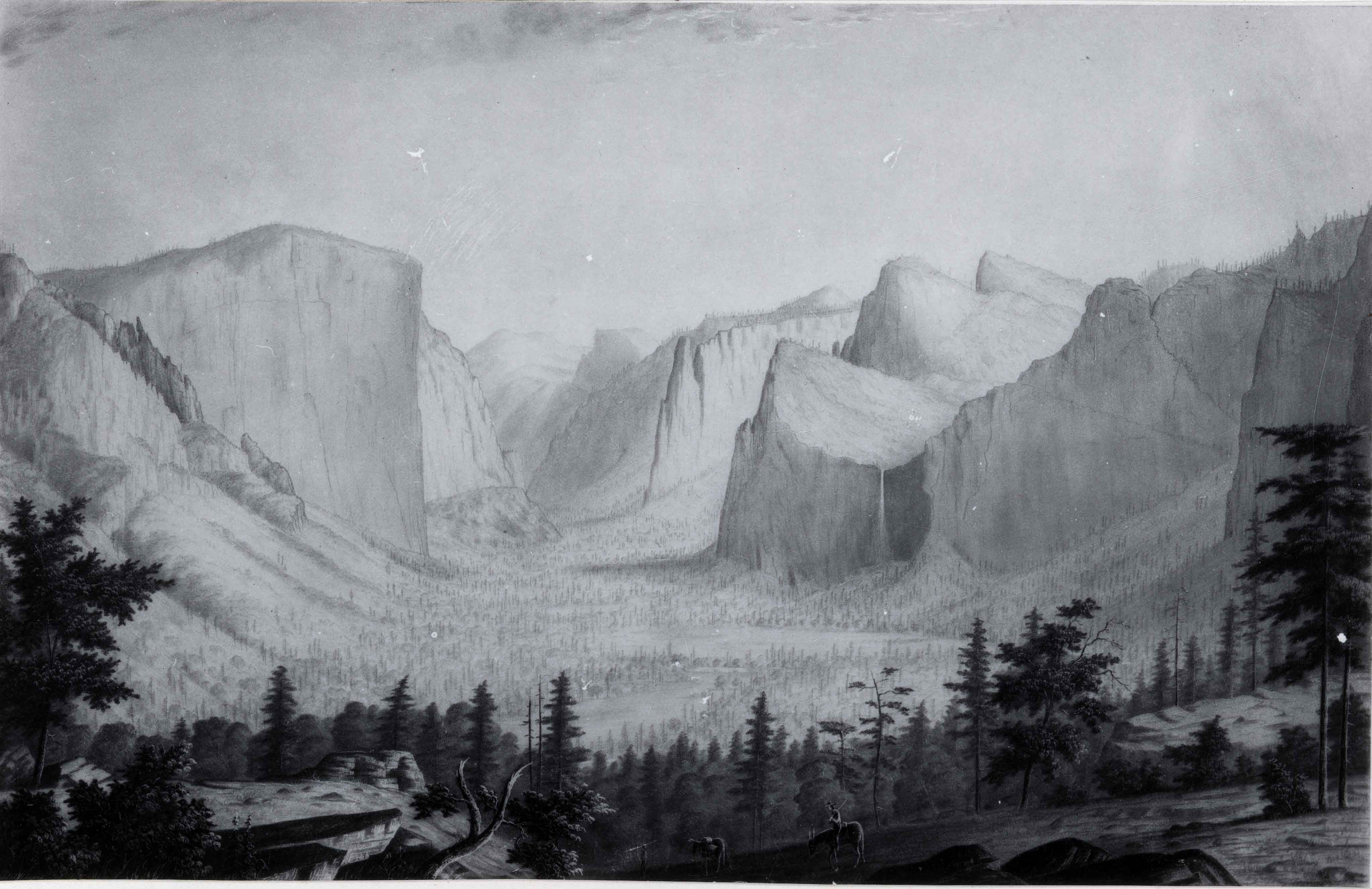
Earliest known drawing of Yosemite Valley, created near present day Tunnel View.

The quality of his work as art is not generally considered high, but since his work is historically important and the originals are rare, these works are considered to be very significant.
