= Eleanor Merriam Lukits =

American painter

- Born: 1909; Detroit, Michigan
- Occupation: Painter

Eleanor Merriam Lukits (1909 -1948) was born in Detroit, Michigan. She first leaned to paint from her father, the artist James A. Merriam. The family moved to Los Angeles in 1920 when Eleanor was in her early twenties.

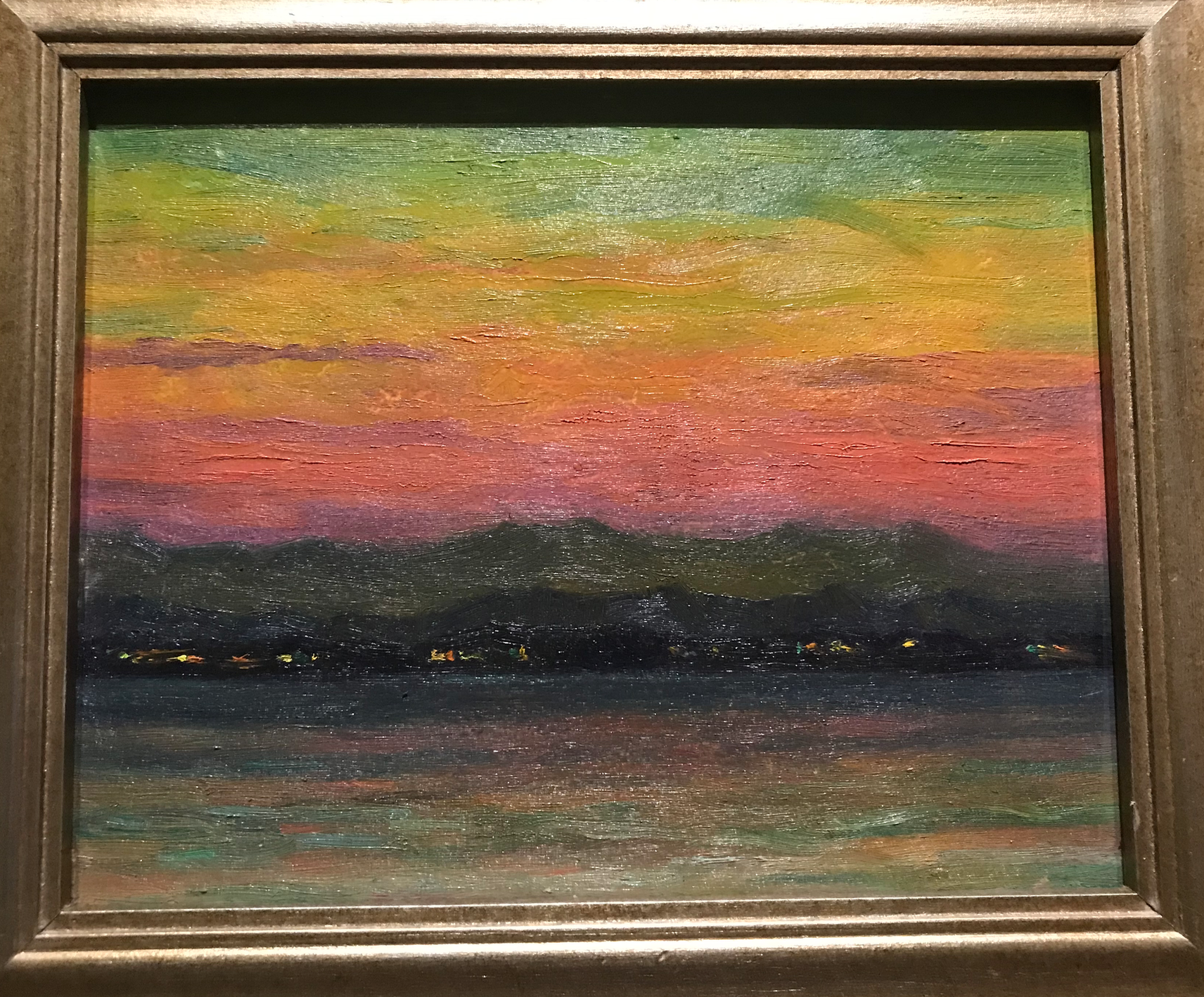
Evening Mood--Balboa Beach circa 1937 by Eleanor Merriam Lukits.

She enrolled in the Lukits School of Fine Arts, where she studies classical art under the director, Theodore Lukits. Eleanor became one of Lukits's favorite models at the school. After several years of study, exhibiting her work, and winning awards at the Friday Morning Club and Ebell Club, she married Theodore Lukits in 1937 in Santa Barbara, California.

She loved painting models and actors and actresses in ethnic costumes, particularly Spanish costumes. Eleanor first aspired to be a portrait painter but later specialized in nature studies and floral still lifes.
