= Charles J. Bensco =

Hungarian-born American painter (1894–1960)

- Born: c. 1894; Hungary
- Died: November 4, 1960; Phoenix, Arizona, U.S.
- Resting place: Greenwood Memorial Park
- Occupation: Painter
- Spouse: Ada Bensco

Charles J. Bensco (c. 1894 – November 4, 1960) was a Hungarian-born American portrait painter and muralist based in Los Angeles, California from 1929 to 1949 and Phoenix, Arizona from 1949 to 1960. He painted the portraits of many Hollywood celebrities and prominent Arizonans.

== Life ==
Bensco was born circa 1894 in Hungary. He emigrated to the United States as a child, he was educated in New York City, and he served in World War I.

Bensco began his career in advertising in New York City. He became a portrait painter in Los Angeles, California in 1929, and he was an art teacher in Hollywood from 1935 to 1948. Bensco was the president of the Los Angeles chapter of the Society for Sanity in Art in 1940. While he was living in Los Angeles, he painted the portraits of many celebrities, and he exhibited his work at the Stendahl Galleries.

Bensco opened a studio on Polk Street in Phoenix, Arizona in 1949, and he painted the portraits of many prominent Arizonans. He also painted murals for private residences. He was named the American Artists Professional League's American Artist of the Year in 1951.

Bensco had a wife, Ada. He died on November 4, 1960, in Phoenix, Arizona, at age 66. He was buried in Greenwood Memorial Park.
