= Tim Solliday =

American painter (born 1952)

- Born: June 9, 1952 (age 74); Ottumwa, Iowa, US
- Education: Lukits Academy
- Known for: Landscape painting
- Movement: American Impressionism

Tim Solliday (born June 9, 1952) is an American painter. He studied with the California Impressionist portrait and landscape painter Theodore Lukits (1897–1992) in the 1970s and began working professionally in the early 1980s. Solliday is described as a painter with a "muscular, masculine style" and has been compared to artists of the Taos Ten, especially E. Martin Hennings. He is a Signature Member of the California Art Club (f. 1909). He exhibits with the Laguna Plein-Air Painters Association, the Oil Painters of America and at the Maynard Dixon Invitational, which is held in Utah each year. Solliday's work has been featured in a number of American art magazines such as Southwest Art, American Artist and Art of the West. Through his plein-air work in the pastel medium and large canvasses, he has played an important role in the revival of landscape painting in Southern California.

== Youth and artistic training ==
Solliday was born in the small town of Ottumwa, Iowa, but grew up on the Palos Verdes Peninsula in southern California. His father was an artist and an illustrator, so he developed an interest in art as a young boy. After he completed his education, Solliday went to work in the billboard industry as an apprentice. While he was interested in becoming a fine artist, working in outdoor advertising proved to be good experience for an aspiring painter and it enabled him to pay for his art studies. It was while working in this commercial field that he learned about the Lukits Academy, where the Early California painter Theodore Lukits still gave students classical instruction. Solliday began his studies there in 1975. This course of study is now commonly known as the Atelier Method. Solliday studied with Lukits for five years. He began by "drawing from the antique" which meant doing charcoal or graphite portraits of marbles and plaster casts of ancient Roman and Greek statuary. These studies taught the students to understand "values" which are the tonal gradations of light and shadow. Solliday moved from working from plaster casts to simple still life set-ups only after his instructor was satisfied with his work. Eventually he began to work in color, painting still life set-ups under the colored lights that Lukits used to simulate conditions an artist would find out of doors. He also attended Lukits' anatomy and life drawing classes.

== Beginning plein-air painting ==
During the summers Solliday also began to paint “en plein-air”, directly from the landscape. He began going out painting with Arny Karl (1940–2000), an older Lukits student who had been painting out of doors for a number of years. Using the pastel medium, he, Karl and Peter Seitz Adams went on plein-air trips to the local foothills, the Southland beaches, including trips to the ocean and the San Gabriel Mountains. Solliday, Adams and Karl painted en plein-air with pastels, as their teacher Lukits had done in the 1920s and 1930s. Solliday concluded his studies in 1980.

== Professional career ==
In the early 1980s, Solliday left the outdoor advertising industry to paint full-time. He began exhibiting his works in Beverly Hills and Carmel, California. The early works that he sold were western paintings of cowboys and American Indians which were heavily influenced by American illustrators of the early 20th century. By the mid-1980s, he branched out into scenes of horses and horse racing that were done from sketches made at the Santa Anita racetrack. By the 1980s and early 1990s, Solliday began concentrating on plein-air landscapes instead of western subjects. In 1994, Solliday and the illustrator Bill Stout became two of the first artists to join the organization. During this phase of his career, he exhibited his work in Pasadena and Los Angeles. By 2003, Art and Antiques Magazine described Solliday as "one of the top contemporary plein-air artists." According to a recent article by the western art writer Bonnie Ganglehoff, Solliday's work has taken a new direction in recent years, because he has been working with his friend Steve Huston, a figurative painter. In the pages of Southwest Art, she wrote that working with Huston gave his work a new dynamism.

== Awards and honors ==
- 1st Prize, 86th Annual California Art Club Gold Medal Exhibition, July 8–16, 1995
- 1st Prize, 1993 Landscape, Oil Painters of America Annual Exhibition
- Arts for the Parks Finalist, 1993
- Arts for the Parks Finalist, 1991

== See also ==
- Atelier Method
- California Art Club
- California Plein-Air Painting
- En plein air
- Cowboy in art and culture
- Landscape art
- Peter Seitz Adams
- Arny Karl
- Billboard

== Magazine references ==
- Morseburg, Jeffrey, Tim Solliday, A Biographical Sketch, Art of California
- Ganglehoff, Bonnie, Catching Up With Tim Solliday, Southwest Art Magazine, July 2008
- Western Art Collector, July 2008
- Editors, 'Artist Worth Watching,' Art-Talk, November 2004
- Otserman, Julie, Coast to Coast,' Southwest Art, August 2004
- Gangelhoff, Bonnie, 'Wild at Heart,' Southwest Art, February 2004
- Herrin, Alice, 'Art Events- Texas,' Southwest Art, September 2003
- Moure, Nancy Dustin Wall, 'Coming of Age,' Art & Antiques, June 2003
- Editors, 'On the Scene,' Southwest Art, May 2003
- Editors, 'On the Scene,' Southwest Art, March 2003
- Stavig, Vikki, 'The Moods of God's Spirit,' Art of the West, January 2003
- Stavig, Vikki'For the Love of the Land,' Art of the West, July 2002
- Stavig, Vikki, 'Revitalization of the California Art Club,' Art of the West, May 2002
- 'Art Events,' Southwest Art, February 2001
- Brown, Joan, 'Light Motif: California Impressionism,' Wildlife Art, December 2000
- Stavig, Vikki, 'Tradition Lives On/California Art Club,' Art of the West, June 2000
- Burlingham, Michael J., 'Man with a Muse,' American Artist, July 1999
- Bucher, Kristen, 'Best of the West: Texas,' Southwest Art, April 1997
- McGarry, Susan Hallsten, 'Variety and Harmony,' Southwest Art, February 1997
- Runbeck, Katheryn, 'Tim Solliday,' Southwest Art, February 1997

== Catalogs ==
- California Art Club: 99th Annual Gold Medal Juried Exhibition, 2010 (CAC Exhibition Catalog), Artist Entry and illustration
- California Art Club: 98th Annual Gold Medal Juried Exhibition, 2009 (CAC Exhibition Catalog), Artist Entry and illustration
- California Art Club: 97th Annual Gold Medal Juried Exhibition, 2008 (CAC Exhibition Catalog), Artist Entry and illustration
- California Art Club: 96th Annual Gold Medal Juried Exhibition, 2007 (CAC Exhibition Catalog), Artist Entry and illustration
- California Art Club: 95th Annual Gold Medal Juried Exhibition, 2006 (CAC Exhibition Catalog), Artist Entry and illustration
- California Art Club: 94th Annual Gold Medal Juried Exhibition, 2005 (CAC Exhibition Catalog), Artist Entry and illustration
- California Art Club: 93rd Annual Gold Medal Juried Exhibition, 2004 (CAC Exhibition Catalog), Artist Entry and illustration
- California Art Club: 92nd Annual Gold Medal Juried Exhibition, 2003 (CAC Exhibition Catalog), Artist Entry and illustration
- California Art Club: 92nd Annual Gold Medal Juried Exhibition, 2002 (CAC Exhibition Catalog), Artist Entry and illustration
- California Art Club: 91st Annual Gold Medal Juried Exhibition, 2001 (CAC Exhibition Catalog), Artist Entry and illustration
