= Edmund H. Wuerpel =

American painter (1866–1958)

Edmund Henry Wuerpel
- Born: May 13, 1866; St. Louis, Missouri, U.S.
- Died: February 1958 (aged 91)
- Education: Washington University in St. Louis, Washington University School of Fine Art, Académie Julian, École des Beaux-Arts
- Occupations: Painter, educator, academic administrator, designer of orthodontics
- Employer: Washington University in St. Louis
- Movement: Tonalism
- Spouse: Minnie Clay Johnson
- Children: 3

Edmund Henry Wuerpel (May 13, 1866—February 1958) was an American painter, longtime educator, and second director of the St. Louis School and Museum of Fine Arts, part of Washington University in St. Louis. In his years of training in Paris, Wuerpel became a friend of painter James Abbott McNeill Whistler who helped spread the influence of the "Tonal School" in the Midwest. In a parallel career Wuerpel also played an important role in the development of orthodontics, collaborating with the "first great teacher of orthodontia" Edward Angle and lecturing in the Midwest and western United States on aesthetics and orthodontics.

== Early years ==
Edmund Wuerpel was born in St. Louis to a German father and Austrian mother. His father was the Cashier of the People's Savings Bank in St. Louis. On January 31, 1875, the elder Wuerpel absconded with the available assets of the bank and fled to Mexico. His family followed him there.

He was a frail child, plagued with lifelong eye problems. His father worked in mining and railroads and he did a "man's work" in these industries as a boy. Because the family frequently moved, Wuerpel was home schooled by his mother. He learned to speak German and English and Spanish from people around him in Mexico. In 1879, when he was 13, his family sent him back to family members in St. Louis to further his education. He was an outstanding student and graduated from the Manual Training School and was awarded the Selew Medal for the highest four-year average. He was unable to see for the last year of his career in high school. After his high school graduation, he entered the School of Engineering at Washington University in St. Louis. He was struck down by illness in 1887 and traveled to Australia to recover.

== Art and orthodontics ==
About the turn of the twentieth century, Wuerpel became friends with the early orthodontics pioneer Edward Angle. At that time Angle was struggling to develop aesthetic criteria for dental orthodontics. He sought out models to give his students when they were working on creating a better bite and smile for their patients. With his artistic ability, knowledge of anatomy, and taste. Wuerpel was instrumental in developing aesthetics for dentists and he lectured at the Angle School in St. Louis, New York as well as New London, Connecticut and Pasadena, California. With Angle he developed the Angle-Wuerpel orthodontic table. He was an honorary member of the Angle Society for Dentists.

== Artistic career ==
Because he had an interest in art, Wuerpel entered the Washington University School of Fine Arts upon his return to St. Louis in 1887. In order to further his training, he left for Paris, which was then the most popular training grounds for American art students. He studied at the private Académie Julian and the Ecole des Beaux Arts, the official state sponsored art school, where the tuition was free if you passed the "concours" for admission. Wuerpel studied with Jean Aman-Jean, Jean-Léon Gérôme and Tony Robert-Fleury. In Paris he became close friends with James Abbott McNeill Whistler, the expatriate American painter and eccentric raconteur. Whistler wrote to his sister Beatrice of him:

"As I told you this morning Wink, poor Mortimer seems to have had rather a cold time of it with this spoil he meandered back from Wuerpel's country with! - don't you think so? Dear me! when are we going to write to the good kind Wuerpel! - Well when I am sitting by you in a day or two! we will get off a whole batch of letters! wont we Chinkie"

In old age he recalled that Whistler had requested that his painting "Nocturne: The Solent" hang next to Wuerpel's at the Paris Salon. Wuerpel had a reputation for being an interesting man and he also became acquainted with Rodman Wanamaker, Sarah Bernhardt and Whitelaw Reid. John Wanamaker, Rodman's father and the founder of the famous Philadelphia store of that name was one of his first clients and he purchased a painting in 1894, the year that Wuerpel returned home. and soon began teaching at the Washington University School of Fine Arts. He initially taught the life class. The American Impressionist Richard E. Miller was one of his first students and began painting in a tonal style while working under Wuerpel. Another of his early students was an American woman Wilhelmina Weber Furlong shortly after her arrival in Paris in the late 1890s she abandoned Wuerpel's style of tonalism. Wuerpel succeeded Ives as director of the School of Fine Arts and went on to teach for 58 years, the longest career of any member of the staff at Washington University. Wurpel remained director for more than thirty years and taught more than 10,000 young art students.

== Personal life ==
Soon after returning from his studies in France, he wed Minnie Clay Johnson. The couple had three daughters: Althea (1896–1923?), Lois (1898–1992) and Margaret (1900–1942). Wuerpel died at the age of 91 while he and his wife were living with his daughter Lois Bowles. His wife died only a few months later, on May 18, 1958.

== Analysis of Wuerpel's art ==
Wuerpel's work must be classified as Tonalism. He used a limited palette and painted intimate landscapes, usually of trees. Wurpel was also known for his unusual palette and thus was often referred to with the appellation "Purple Wuerpel." He was not a prolific painter. Few appear in gallery inventories or sold at auction. In an interview late in his life, he estimated his artistic output at about 1,100 paintings and that he had sold about 400.
