= John Bond Francisco =

American painter and violinist

- Born: December 14, 1863; Cincinnati, Ohio, U.S.
- Died: January 8, 1931 (aged 67); Los Angeles, California, U.S.
- Resting place: Rosedale Cemetery
- Education: Ohio State University
- Occupations: Painter, violinist
- Spouse: Nanette Louise Gottschalk
- Children: 1 son, 1 daughter

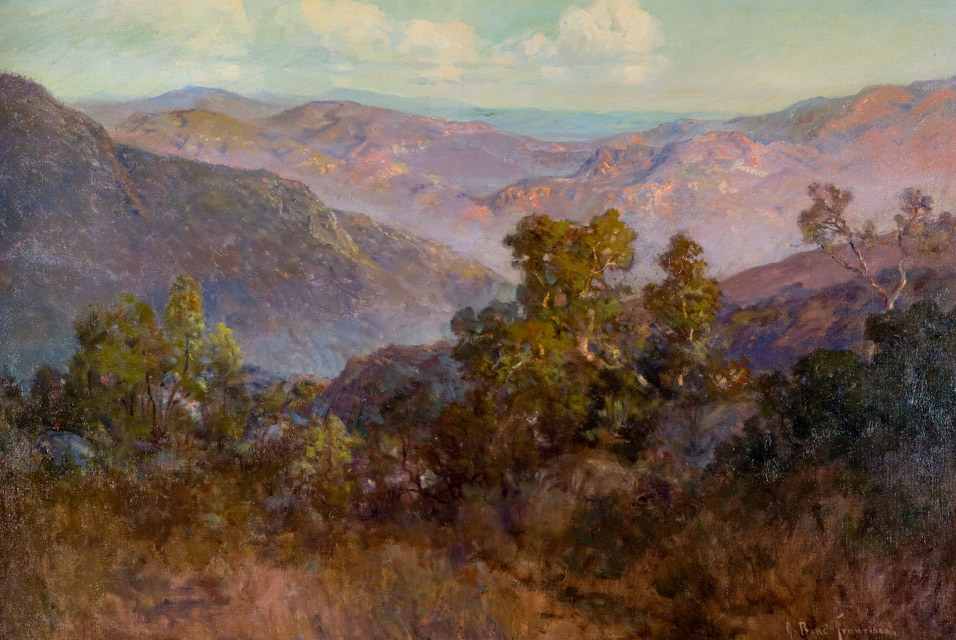
The Foothills of California, Tejon Ranch

John Bond Francisco (December 14, 1863 - January 8, 1931) was an American painter and violinist. He exhibited his paintings in Los Angeles, California as early as 1892 and he co-founded the Los Angeles Symphony Orchestra in 1897.

== Life ==
Francisco was born on December 14, 1863, in Cincinnati, Ohio. His father, Andrew Wiggins Francisco, was the editor of the Ohio State Journal. Francisco graduated from Ohio State University, and he also studied in Paris, Munich and Berlin.

Francisco began his career as a music teacher in Los Angeles, California in 1887. He exhibited his paintings in Los Angeles as early as 1892. Francisco was a member of the Southern California Art Club and the Laguna Beach Art Club, and he founded the Society of Fine Arts of Southern California in 1895. Two years later, in 1897, he co-founded the Los Angeles Symphony Orchestra with Harley Hamilton, and he was its first concert master.

Francisco resided at 1401 Albany Street in Los Angeles with his wife, née Nanette Louise Gottschalk. They had a son, Jack Bond Francisco Jr., and a daughter, Mrs Herbert McGaffey. Francisco died at home on January 8, 1931, at age 68, and he was buried in the Rosedale Cemetery.

== Legacy ==
According to Peter J. Holliday, "Francisco was responsible for conferring respectability on the artist's calling in Los Angeles." For Kevin Starr, California's State Librarian, Francisco showed "that life could be lived for art in Los Angeles and Southern California with panache and financial success," and he "dazzled contemporary Los Angelenos and filled them with pride that Culture was at last coming to the Southland."

In 1992, his grandson donated his papers to the Smithsonian Institution's Archives of American Art. His work can be seen at the Smithsonian American Art Museum.
