= Jack Wilkinson Smith =

American painter

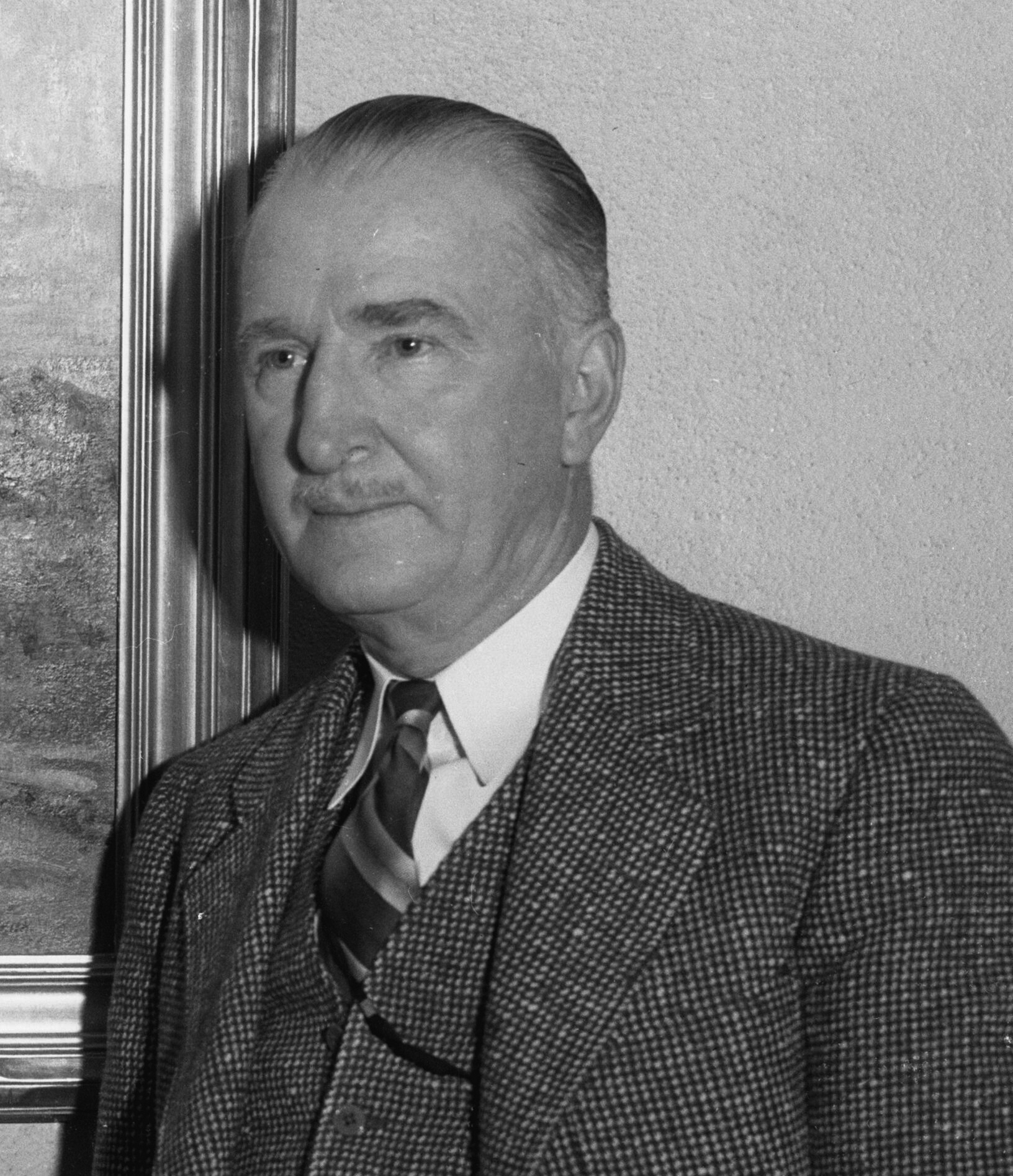
- Smith, c. 1939
- Born: February 7, 1873; Paterson, New Jersey, U.S.
- Died: January 8, 1949 (aged 75); Monterey Park, California, U.S.
- Education: Chicago Art Institute
- Occupation: Painter
- Spouse: Emma B. Troup

Jack Wilkinson Smith (February 7, 1873 – January 8, 1949) was an American painter.

== Life ==
Smith was born on February 7, 1873, in Paterson, New Jersey. He was trained at the Chicago Art Institute.

Smith began his career as an illustrator for The Cincinnati Enquirer, covering battles of the Spanish–American War. He became a professional painter in California in 1906, moved to Oregon, and returned to California, where he painted scenes in Laguna Beach, California. He was a co-founder of the California Art Club in 1909, and the Biltmore Salon in Los Angeles in the 1920s.

Smith resided in Alhambra, California with his wife, née Emma B. Troup. He died on January 8, 1949, in Monterey Park, California, at age 75.
