= St. Louis School of Fine Arts =

Former art school in St. Louis, Missouri

Coordinates: 38°38′49″N 90°18′10″W

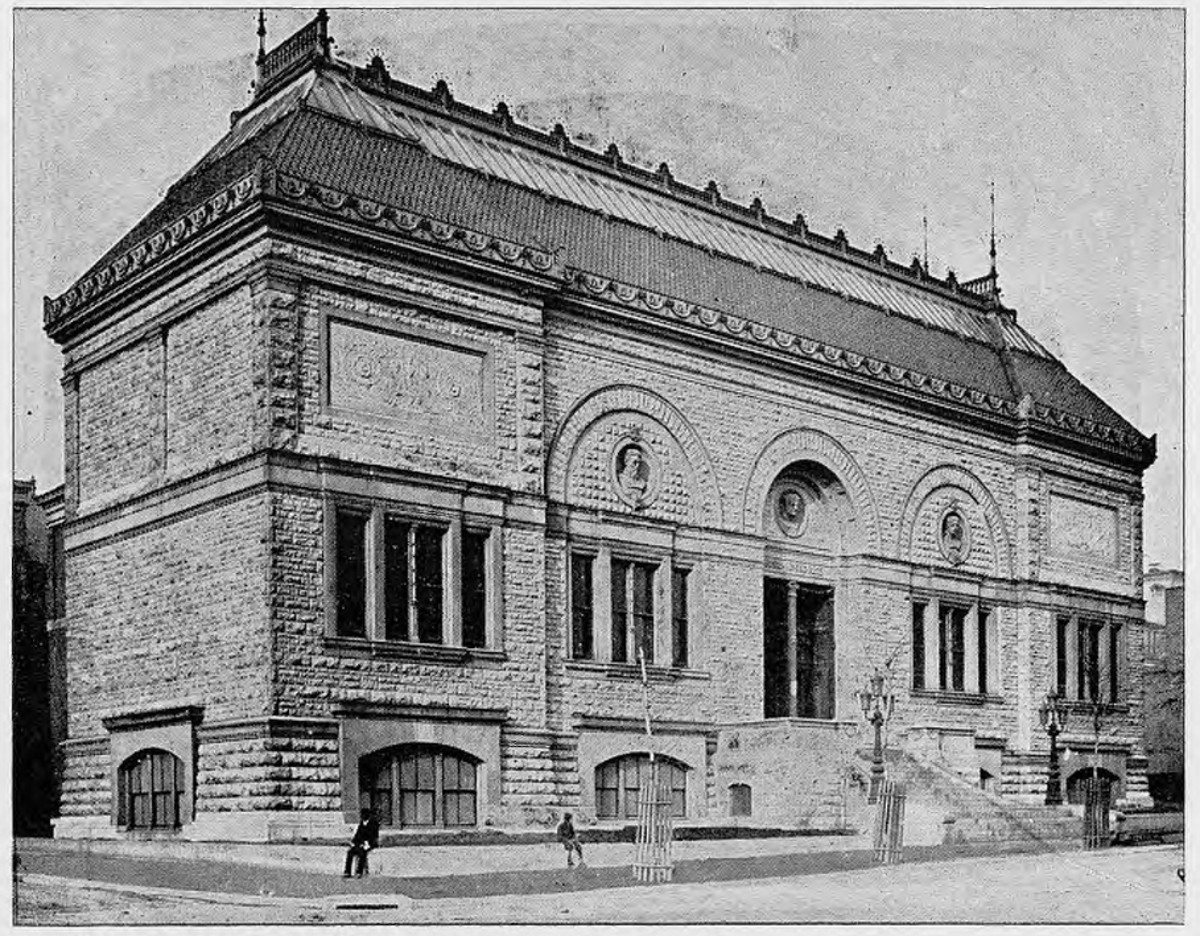
1879 Peabody and Stearns building, home of the art school 1879–05 (razed 1919)

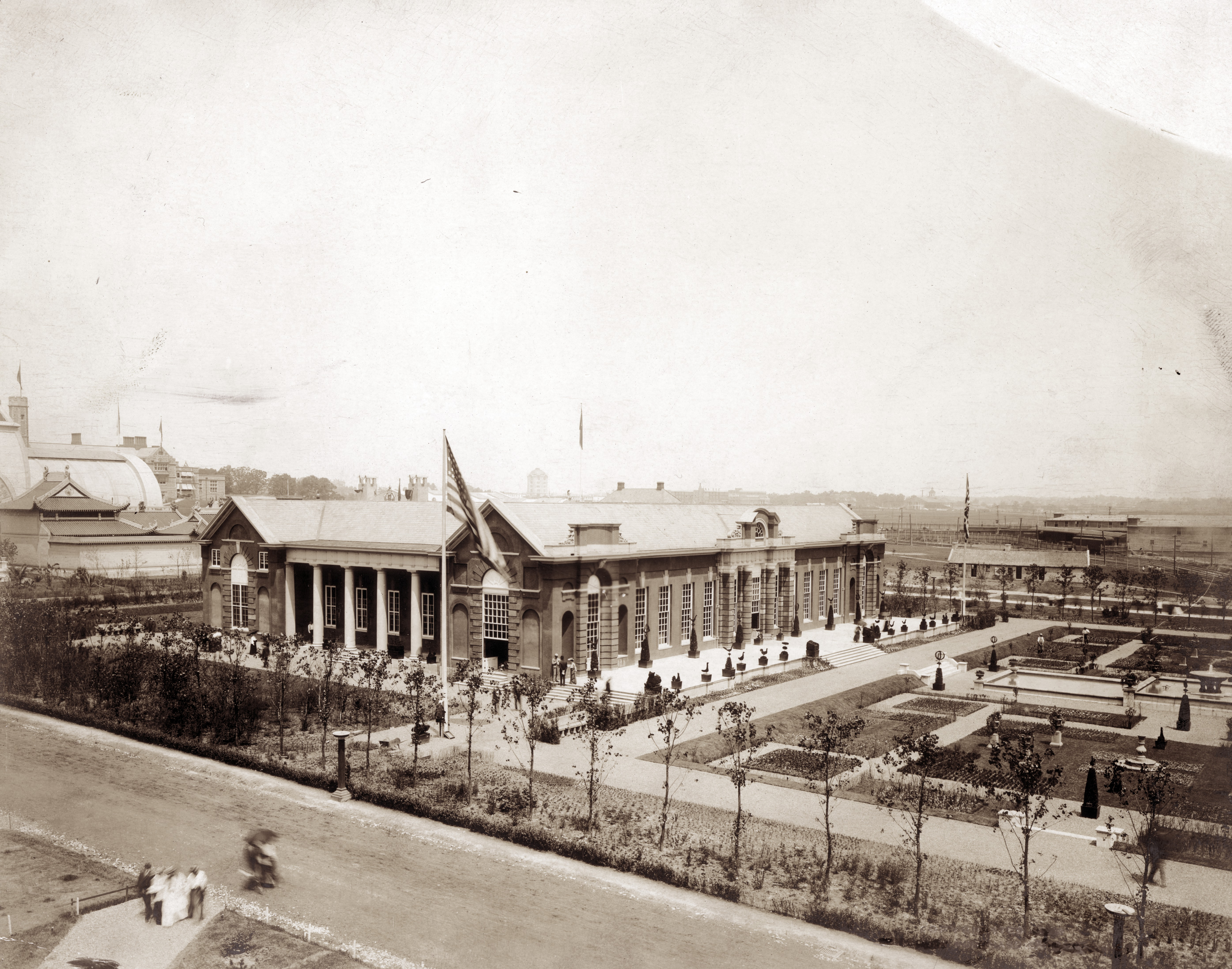
former British Pavilion building, home of the art school 1905–25 (razed 1925)

The St. Louis School of Fine Arts was founded as the Saint Louis School and Museum of Fine Arts in 1879 as part of Washington University in St. Louis, and has continuously offered visual arts and sculpture education since then. Its purpose-built building stood in downtown St. Louis on Lucas Place.

After about 25 years of operation, in 1909, a legal conflict over funding split the organization into two parts: the school and its art collection, which remained part of privately held Washington University, and a public civic art museum, which became the Saint Louis Art Museum.

The art school moved to the university campus. With changes of name and location on campus, it continued operations up until 2006 when the school was incorporated into the Sam Fox School of Design & Visual Arts, which spans graduate and undergraduate arts curriculum, graduate and undergraduate schools of architecture, and the university's art collection in its Mildred Lane Kemper Art Museum.

== Foundation ==
As of 1878, painter and art professor Halsey Ives had managed an art program with an affiliation with Washington University for four years, providing both academic and vocational art training, with night classes held at no charge, and with ladies promised "the same advantages as other students". That effort was formalized on May 22, 1879, the date of the formal establishment of the St. Louis School of Fine Art as a department of the university.

Its main financial benefactor was Wayman Crow, who commissioned a school and museum building from Boston architects Peabody and Stearns as a memorial to his deceased son Wayman Crow Jr. It stood at 19th and Lucas Place (now Locust Street).

After the closing of the 1904 Louisiana Purchase Exposition, the museum and school moved into the Palace of Fine Arts in Forest Park, designed by Cass Gilbert. The school would not remain there very long.

== Organizational split ==
In 1907 Ives introduced a funding bill into the General Assembly for an art tax to support the museum and school. Voters approved enthusiastically. But the city controller refused to disburse tax money to a private university, and the Missouri Supreme Court agreed, forcing the institution to split into three organizations:

- a newly created, public City Art Museum, to remain in the Palace of Fine Arts, which evolved into the Saint Louis Art Museum an organizing board was assigned to take control in 1912.
- the university art collection, whose collection was lent to the City Art Museum until 1960, and reorganized in 2004 into the Mildred Lane Kemper Art Museum
- and the St. Louis School of Fine Arts, with simplified name, which remained part of the University

In 1905 Ives was replaced as director by alumnus and instructor Edmund H. Wuerpel.

== On the Danforth Campus ==
As of September 1909 Wuerpel advertised classes at Skinker and Lindell. At that corner, the art school would be temporarily housed in another remnant of the 1904 fair for more than 20 years: the former British Pavilion building, built as a replica of the Orangery at Kensington Palace. (The former school and museum downtown was also the original home of The Ethical Society of St. Louis. After the school departed in 1909, it was still used for artists' studios, and its 700-seat auditorium was used for civic functions such as public receptions for Mark Twain, After a fire in 1919 it was demolished. The Weber Implement and Automobile Company Building was built on its site.)

In 1926 the art school was given its own new building on campus, Bixby Hall, which incorporated paneling and windows from the British Pavilion in its main hall. It was named for benefactor William K. Bixby.

Wuerpel remained director for 30 years, until his retirement in 1939. The name "St. Louis School of Fine Arts" was formally retained until at least 1945, with other varying names used afterward.

German-American art historian and author of the standard textbook, History of Art, H. W. Janson, taught at the school from 1941 to 1948. Among its instructors were Philip Guston (1946), the German painter Max Beckmann (1946-1948), the Bauhaus visual artist Werner Drewes (1946-1965), painter Edward Boccia (1951-1986), and painter Siegfried Reinhardt (1955-1970).

George Julian Zolnay headed its sculpture department from 1903 to 1909; Carl C. Mose was the head of the sculpture department from 1936 to 1947.

Kenneth E. Hudson was Dean of the School of Art from 1939 to 1969, and during his tenure, the first Bachelor of Fine Arts degree was offered in 1941. Joe Deal was the dean of the School of Art from 1989 to 1999.

In 2006 the school was incorporated into the Sam Fox School of Design & Visual Arts.
