= David Gilmour Blythe =

American painter (1815–1865)

David Gilmour Blythe (May 9, 1815 – May 15, 1865) was a self-taught American artist best known for paintings which satirically portrayed political and social situations. Blythe was also an accomplished portraitist and poet. He is widely regarded as the Pittsburgh region's pre-eminent nineteenth-century painter.

== Early years ==
Blythe was born in East Liverpool, Ohio on May 9, 1815 to poor parents of Scots and Irish ancestry. After a childhood in a log cabin by the Ohio River, at the age of 16, Blythe moved to Pittsburgh, Pennsylvania. There he apprenticed himself to woodcarver Joseph Woodwell. After his apprenticeship, Blythe returned to East Liverpool for a time and then joined the United States Navy in 1837. His service on the USS Ontario included voyages to the Caribbean islands and Mexico. After his discharge from the Navy, Blythe returned to East Liverpool and took up work as an itinerant portrait painter. Always restless, Blythe traveled widely from Baltimore to Philadelphia and perhaps as far as New Orleans.

Other than his stint with Woodwell, Blythe had no known artistic education or training and his early East Liverpool portraits were ungraceful and stiff. Despite this dearth of formal training, Blythe's proficiency, sophistication and finesse as an artist grew. Blythe fancied himself a poet as well as a painter. His early poetry was written in East Liverpool and is generally of a sentimental, simple nature.

== Adulthood ==
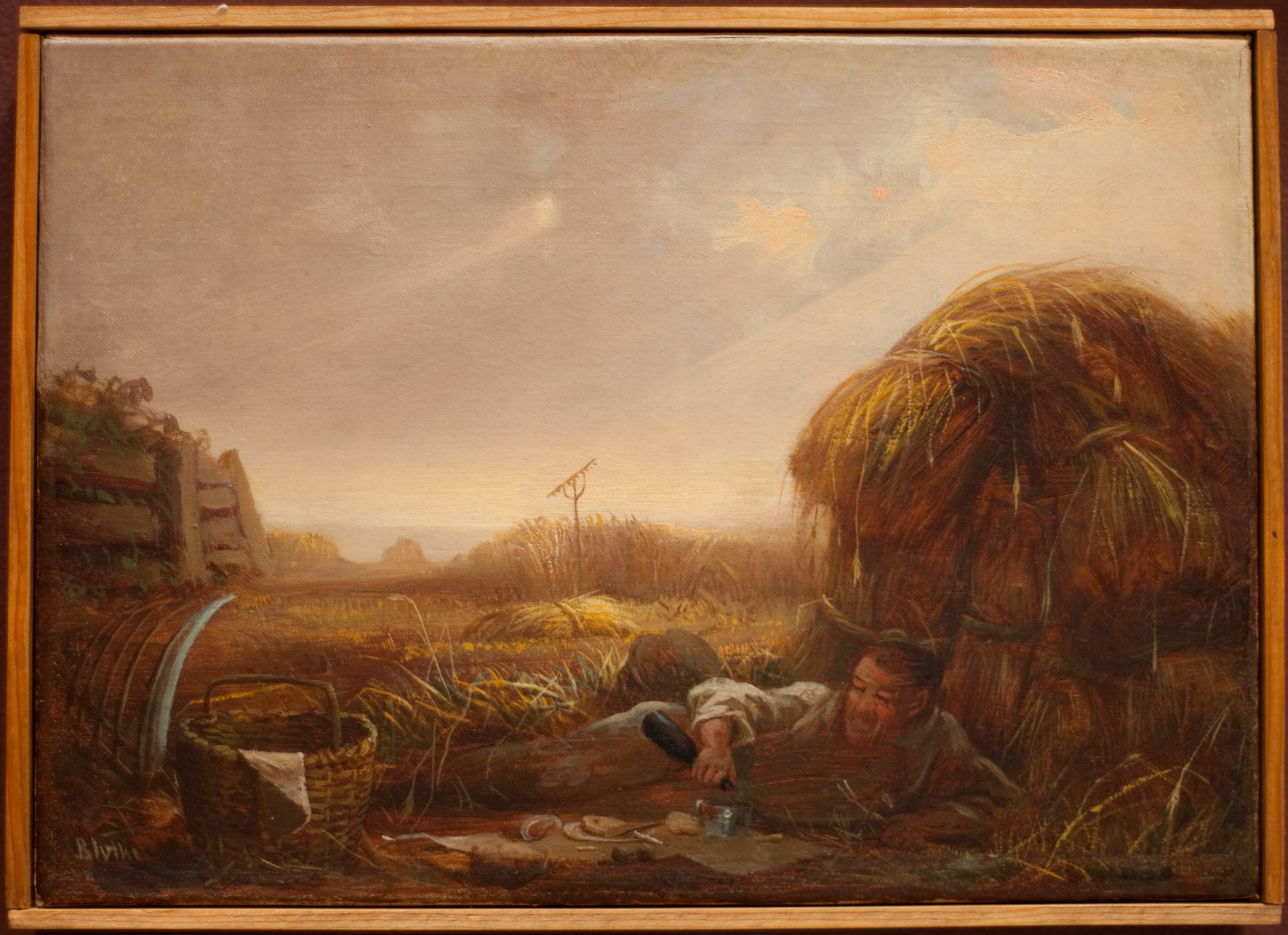
Blythe's Man Eating in a Field, c. 1856–1863

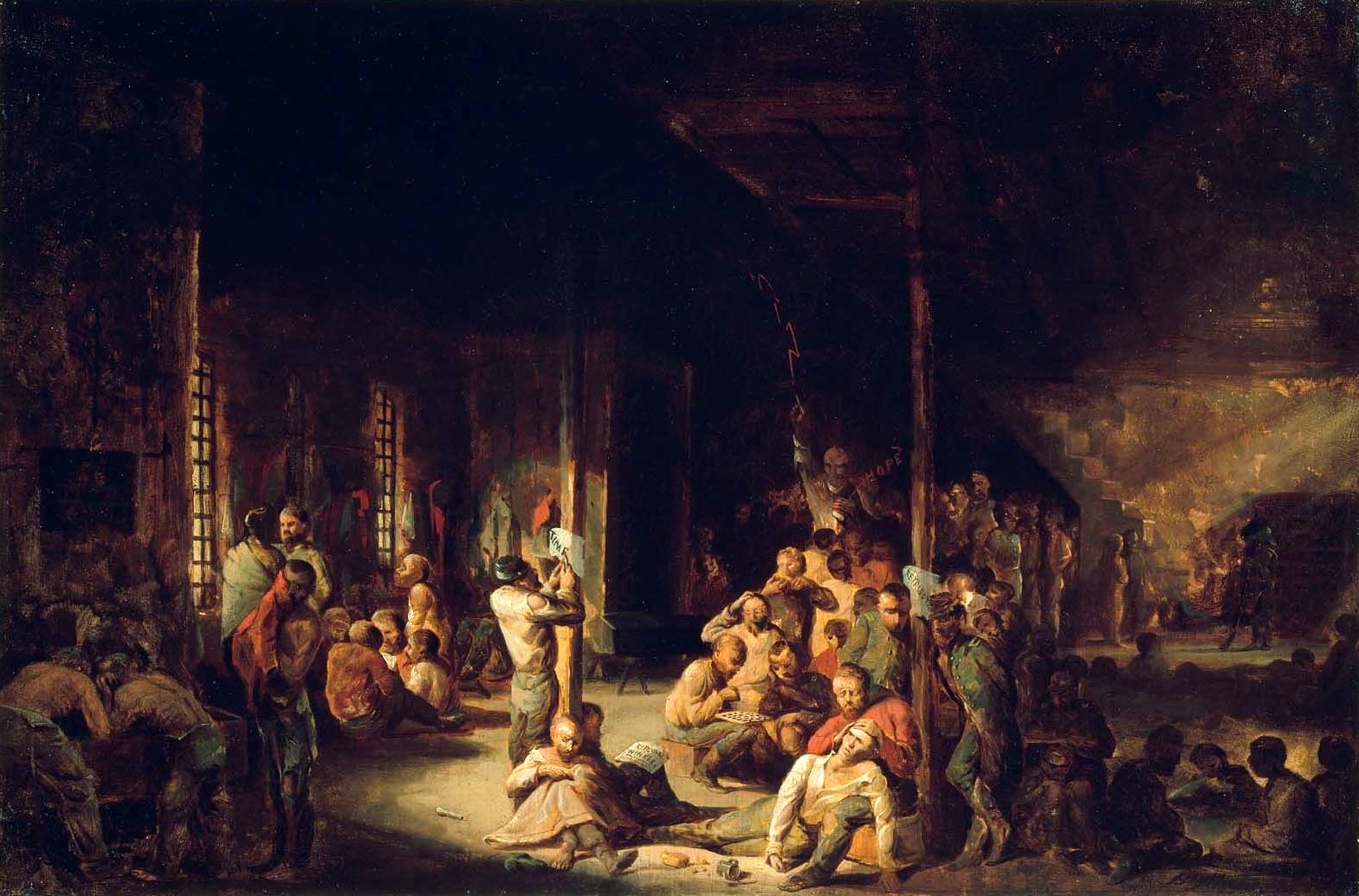
Libby Prison, 1863

In the late 1840s Blythe moved from East Liverpool to Uniontown, Pennsylvania, probably due to his courtship of Julia Ann Keffer. The couple had been acquainted since the mid-1840s. Julia's family had relocated to Uniontown sometime around 1847. Julia and David were married in Pittsburgh's Roman Catholic cathedral on September 30, 1848 and set up residence in Uniontown. Blythe established a living as a portraitist in Uniontown, and a large number of his early portraits from that period survive. They are generally in the same stiff manner as his early East Liverpool portraits. In addition to painting, Blythe was commissioned to carve a large poplar (8'2") statue of Lafayette for the cupola of the Uniontown, Pennsylvania courthouse.

Blythe also invested a great deal of time and energy in painting a panorama — an early forerunner to motion pictures. Blythe's Great Panorama of the Allegheny Mountains was painted on a canvas roll seven feet tall and about 300 feet long. The panorama contained twenty or so scenes picturing eastern locales of aesthetic or historical importance, including Monticello, Fort Necessity, Harper's Ferry, General Braddock's grave, and others. Panoramas toured various cities and were displayed in rented halls. The canvas was mounted on rollers and each scene was displayed to the paying audience accompanied with narration, and sometimes with music. Subject matter was usually biblical, historical, or scenes of exotic foreign locales such as Egypt. Unfortunately, Blythe's prodigious labors on his panorama came to naught. Though Blythe traveled to exhibit his panorama in Baltimore, Pittsburgh, East Liverpool and a few other locales, it failed to attract interest sufficient to continue touring. Blythe dropped out of the ownership group after the first couple of performances and the panorama eventually disappeared.

Between 1850 and 1852, Blythe suffered several profound losses in addition to failure of the panorama. Both his father and his wife Julia died. After another statue project in nearby Green County fell through, the Uniontown newspapers published Blythe poems in which he referred to Greene County as "a sow grown fat with buttermilk and meal." A Greene County newspaper then published a retort by a local poet — the son of the newspaper's publisher — in which Blythe was named too much of a drunk to be worth anyone's attention. Blythe's impudent response was a letter in which he called the poet "pumpkin-headed" and his father "another growling, whining hound."

After his wife's death, Blythe left Uniontown and began a period of travels throughout the Mississippi River valley. By the mid-1850s, he had returned to East Liverpool. His work as both a painter and a poet had blossomed and grown significantly more confident and mature during this period, perhaps by viewing exhibitions of other painters' works and via heavy reading of English Romantic poets and American mainstays like Longfellow and Poe. The sophisticated group of portraits he produced in the East Liverpool area in these years were noticeably more polished than his early period work. He also wrote a large canon of poetry that was leagues ahead of his early work in its quality and distinctive voice.

Around 1860, Blythe moved to Pittsburgh, the largest city and art market in the region. He turned away from poetry and portraiture and instead concentrated on canvases depicting hot-button social and political issues. Blythe opposed the expansion of both slavery and immigration, and made vigorous visual points regarding both issues in a number of singularly accomplished genre paintings. His work, in conjunction with his views, had become increasingly and bitingly satirical.

== Civil War ==
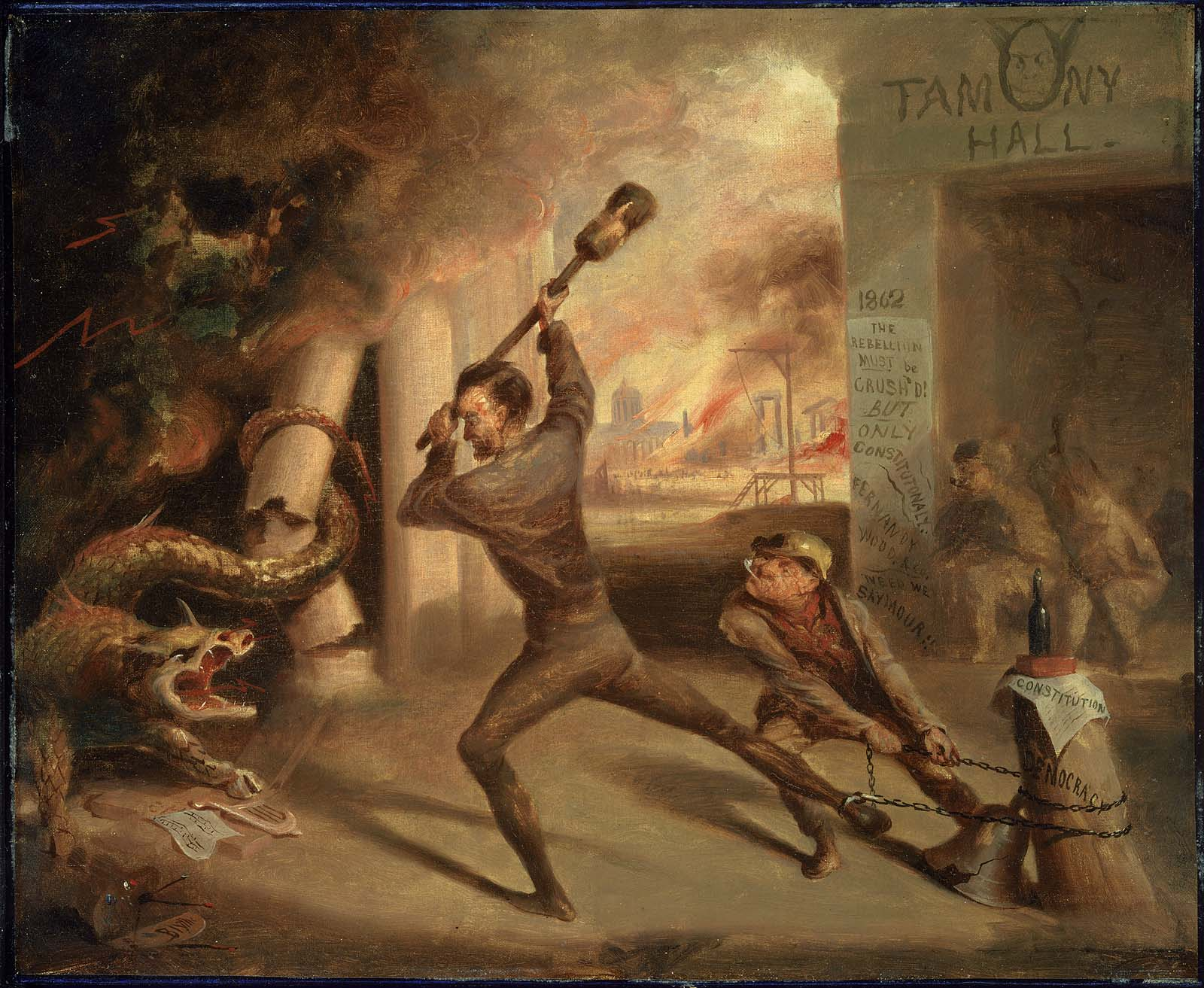
Lincoln Crushing the Dragon of Rebellion, 1862

Blythe painted Lincoln Crushing the Dragon of Rebellion in 1862. The work depicts a fiery Abraham Lincoln in the center of the canvas, straining forward (with one ankle shackled) to crush rebellion (depicted as a reptilian dragon) while in the background, a huge fire rages.

Blythe did not serve in the military during the Civil War. He did follow a regiment in hopes of making sketches to use later as studies for paintings of battle. Although he did not personally witness combat, Blythe gained enough of a sense of the cruelties of war that he was emboldened to paint several powerful pieces. Of these, the most famous is Libby Prison, which Blythe painted in 1863. It depicts Union soldiers suffering intensely in captivity in the South. It is generally considered to be one of the most gruesome of all American paintings of Civil War scenes.

== Later work ==
Many of Blythe's most accomplished paintings offer barbed commentary on the American judicial system; politics; the pretensions of the burgeoning American middle class; and the daily activities of street urchins he encountered in Pittsburgh.

His paintings of children are particularly notable for their distinct lack of sentimentality. Blythe's children generally exhibit a sharp intelligence and bold, cynical expressions. They are shown to be canny participants in the city's hustle-and-bustle: playing marbles for money, setting off firecrackers, picking pockets, smoking cigars, stealing eggs and indulging in other forms of hanky-panky.

Blythe lived an archetypal "starving artist" existence in Pittsburgh, showing little interest in social relationships, his attire or personal hygiene, or the sales of his artwork. Blythe was an alcoholic throughout adulthood. On May 15, 1865, Blythe died of complications of alcoholism after being found unconscious in his garret in downtown Pittsburgh.

== Reputation ==
Although Blythe was well-regarded in Pittsburgh during his final years, he did not enjoy a larger national reputation in his lifetime. For decades — from his death until the 1940s — Blythe's life and work were largely forgotten. Since the 1940s, however, his oeuvre has earned growing respect and prestige. His genre paintings are now in the permanent collections of the Metropolitan Museum of Art; the Museum of Fine Arts, Boston; the Smithsonian American Art Museum; the Westmoreland Museum of American Art; the De Young Museum; the Butler Institute of American Art; and the Art Institute of Chicago among others. The largest collection of Blythe genre paintings (about two dozen) is owned by the Carnegie Museum of Art in Pittsburgh, followed by the ten owned by the private Duquesne Club in downtown Pittsburgh. The East Liverpool (OH) Historical Society owns a large collection of early Blythe portraits, in addition one also hangs in the Museum of Ceramics located in that city of pottery baron Isaac Knowles of Knowles, Taylor and Knowles producers of the famed Lotus Ware, and General LaFayette still stands in the rotunda of the Fayette County Courthouse in Uniontown. A small number of Blythe genre paintings are privately owned. The relative scarcity of his work usually results in high prices for the rare examples that come to auction.
