= Southern Alleghenies Museum of Art =

Coordinates: 40.51564°N 78.40146°W

The Southern Alleghenies Museum of Art (SAMA) is an art museum with five locations in southwestern Pennsylvania in the United States. It is headquartered at Saint Francis University in Loretto, where it was founded in 1976. Other locations were opened later in Hollidaysburg (1979) which moved to Altoona (1995), Johnstown (1982), Ligonier (1997) and Bedford (2018).

Starting with a collection of about 100 objects, the museum's permanent collection now features more than 5,000 works by local, regional, national and international artists. The national artists include, among others, Will Barnet, William Baziotes, Albert Bierstadt, Mary Cassatt, Arny Karl, Walt Kuhn, Theodore Lukits, Thomas Moran, Gilbert Stuart, Thomas Sully, and Pittsburgh native Andy Warhol. Some of the local and regional artists are Ron Donoughe, George Hetzel, and William H. Rau.

The museum is a repository for several distinctive special collections, such as the Charles M. Schwab Collection of Presentation Silver and Other Memorabilia, the Colleen Browning Collection, and the Rezk Collection of Tibetan and Nepalese art.

The Johnstown site is located in the Pasquerilla Performing Arts Center on the campus of the University of Pittsburgh at Johnstown.

The Ligonier site includes rotating displays from the "Walter Carlyle Shaw Paperweight Collection".

== See also ==
- Peter Seitz Adams
- Bo Bartlett
- John Button
- Donald Camp
- Tsugio Hattori
- Stanley Lechtzin
- Knox Martin
- Moheyan
- Mary Jane Peale
