= Elizabeth Shannon =

Elizabeth Shannon may refer to:

- Elizabeth Killigrew, Viscountess Shannon, mistress of Charles II of England
- Shannon Elizabeth (born 1973), actress
- Elizabeth Shannon Phillips (1911–1997) American painter
