= Jeff Wagner =

Jeff Wagner or Geoffrey Wagner may refer to:

- A member of the band The Postmarks
- Jeff Wagner (politician), member of the Ohio House of Representatives
- Jeff Wagner, writer, former co-editor of Metal Maniacs
- Geoffrey Wagner (writer) (1927–2006), English–American scholar and writer
