= Tsugio =

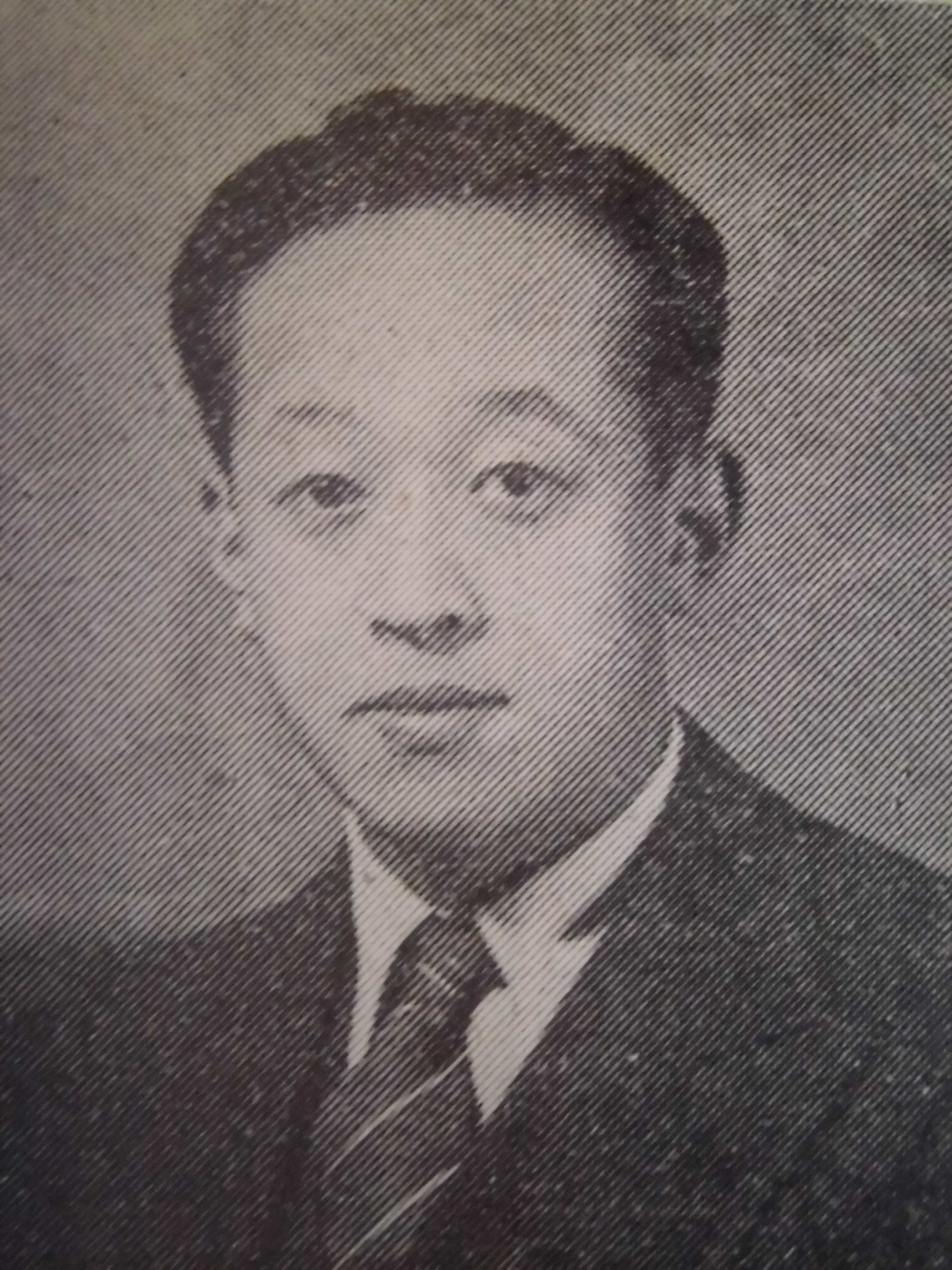
- Tsugio Nakano (1910–1999), Japanese judge.
- Pronunciation: tsɯgʲio (IPA)
- Gender: Male

Origin
- Origin: Japanese
- Meaning: Different meanings depending on the kanji used

Other names
- Alternative spelling: Tugio (Kunrei-shiki) Tugio (Nihon-shiki) Tsugio (Hepburn)

Tsugio is a masculine Japanese given name.

== Written forms ==
Tsugio can be written using different combinations of kanji characters. Here are some examples:

- 次雄, "next, masculine"
- 次男, "next, man"
- 次夫, "next, husband"
- 嗣雄, "succession, masculine"
- 嗣男, "succession, man"
- 嗣夫, "succession, husband"
- 継雄, "continue, masculine"
- 継男, "continue, man"
- 継夫, "continue, husband"

The name can also be written in hiragana つぎお or katakana ツギオ.

== Notable people with the name ==
- Tsugio Hasegawa (長谷川 次男; 1913–?), Japanese figure skater.
- Tsugio Hattori (ツギオ・ハットリ, 1951–1998), American painter.
- Tsugio Ito (伊藤 次男; born 1942), Japanese rower.
- Tsugio Matsuda (松田 次生; born 1979), Japanese racing driver.
- Tsugio Tajima (田島 二男; 1903–2002), Japanese photographer.
- Tsugio Yamazaki (山崎 次男; born 1929), Japanese sport wrestler.
