= Ron Donoughe =

American painter

Ron Donoughe (born 1958) is a southwestern Pennsylvania regional artist based in Pittsburgh, PA. He paints realistic landscapes, cityscapes, and industrial scenes en plein air (on site “in the open air”). In addition to documenting the emotion of a particular time and place, his paintings emphasize shifting patterns of light and shadow, as well as how colors change over distances.

== Biographical background ==
Ron Donoughe grew up in Loretto, Pennsylvania with seven siblings (including an identical twin brother, Don Donoughe). He graduated from Penn Cambria High School in 1976, and went to Indiana University of Pennsylvania (BA, 1980), where he majored in art education. He pursued additional studies in drawing and painting at California College of the Arts in Oakland, CA. Donoughe has worked in a variety of settings (from grave digger to art teacher to chicken catcher to landscaper). He has been painting full-time since 1991.

== Artistic career ==
Themes, Methods, and Style. Donoughe’s early paintings were primarily landscapes, painted en plein air in the Southwestern Pennsylvania countryside. After living in Pittsburgh for several years, he also began to paint cityscapes and industrial scenes. In 2002, Donoughe founded the Plein Air Painters of Western PA.

9”x12” and 11”x14” oil paintings on board comprise a large portion of Donoughe’s oeuvre, and he also paints larger paintings on canvas. Several of Donoughe’s solo exhibitions and permanent installations feature 50 or more 9”x12” oil paintings on board hung close together, thereby creating a mural.

According to Barbara L. Jones, Curator of the Westmoreland Museum of American Art, “With an immediacy of paint application, Ron Donoughe captures not only the essence of a subject or place, but a moment in time as well…Ron is drawn intuitively to the sites that he paints by color, light, atmosphere, texture, shadow, shape, and form…He paints in all seasons and at all times of the day in an effort to translate particular places and moments into art.” Donoughe himself understands painting as a way “to capture the spirit of a particular place and moment.”

== Collections and exhibitions ==
Ron Donoughe’s work can be found in private, corporate, and institutional collections in the United States. His collection of 90 Pittsburgh Neighborhoods is on permanent display at the Senator John Heinz History Center. The Pennsylvania Convention Center also acquired a large installation. His work, Last Days of Steel, is in the permanent collection of the Duquesne Club, and the Westmoreland Museum of American Art has four Donoughe paintings.

He has exhibited in a variety of venues throughout southwestern Pennsylvania, and across the United States. Donoughe participates in five to eight exhibitions a year. In 2014, mural paintings by Ron Donoughe that depict the history of Cambria County, PA were permanently installed in the Cambria County Courthouse (see http://cambriacountyhistorical.com/pdf-docs/CCCourthouseMurals.pdf). Recent exhibitions include:

2018 Cityscapes, Chautauqua Institution, Chautauqua, NY

2017 Labor and Landscape, Southern Alleghenies Museum of Art, Loretto, PA

2016 90 Pittsburgh Neighborhoods, Senator John Heinz History Center, Pittsburgh, PA

2015 90 Pittsburgh Neighborhoods, Pittsburgh Center for the Arts, Pittsburgh PA

2012 Scenes of Johnstown and Cambria County, Bottle Works & Art Works, Johnstown, PA

2011 Across the Alleghenies, Pennsylvania Governor’s Residence, Harrisburg, PA

2010 100th Annual Exhibition, Associated Artists of Pittsburgh, the Carnegie Museum of Art, Pittsburgh, PA

2010 Paint & Pixels: Oil paintings of Ron Donoughe and Graphic Design of Don Donoughe, The University Museum at Indiana University of Pennsylvania, Indiana, PA

2009 A Changing Landscape, Ron Donoughe and Kevin Kutz, Southern Alleghenies Museum of Art, Ligonier, PA

2008–2010 Nomadas Del Arte, Sage Creek Gallery, Santa Fe, NM and Dallas, TX

Donoughe also exhibited in the Art in Embassies Program in the Slovak Republic in 2008, as well as at the Rhineland Industrial Museum in Germany in 2008. The 2010 exhibition at Indiana University of Pennsylvania’s museum was accompanied by a book, Paintings of Indiana County, Pennsylvania. The 2006 Essence of Pittsburgh exhibition at the Pittsburgh Center for the Arts was accompanied by a book, also entitled Essence of Pittsburgh.

In 2016 Donoughe’s book, 90 Pittsburgh Neighborhoods, was published as part of an exhibition with the same name.

== Awards ==
Recent awards include:

2018 Ron Donoughe Day, Proclamation, Mayor and City Council, City of Pittsburgh, PA

2017 Distinguished Alumni Award, Indiana University of Pennsylvania, Indiana, PA

2015 Bottle Works, Artist Hall of Fame, Johnstown, PA

2010 Carnegie Museum of Art, 100th Associated Artists of Pittsburgh Annual, Clara C. Witmer Award, Pittsburgh, PA

2010 Purchase Award, Associated Artists of Pittsburgh Annual, Point Park University, Pittsburgh, PA

2010 Southern Alleghenies Museum of Art, Best Painting of Biennial 2010, Loretto, PA
