= American Jewish Museum =

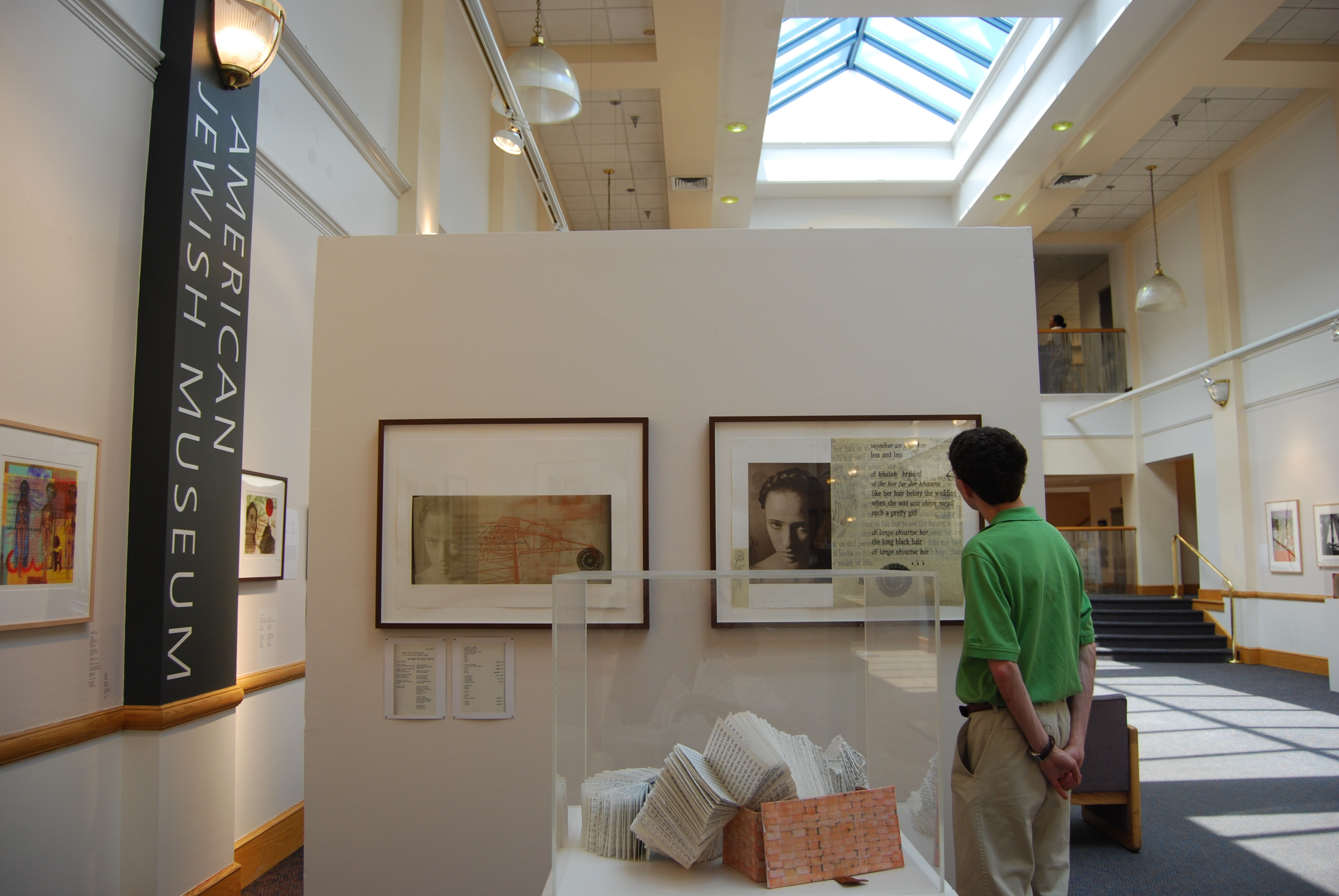
- Fine, Perlow, and Weis Gallery, American Jewish Museum

- Location within Pittsburgh
- Established: 1998
- Location: Pittsburgh, Pennsylvania, U.S.
- Coordinates: 40.437701°N 79.923947°W
- Type: Art museum
- Website: jccpgh.org/jewish-life-arts-events/american-jewish-museum/

The American Jewish Museum, or AJM, is a contemporary Jewish art museum located in Pittsburgh, Pennsylvania. A department of the Jewish Community Center (JCC) of Greater Pittsburgh, the museum is located in the Squirrel Hill JCC at the corner Forbes Avenue and Murray Avenue, in the heart of Pittsburgh's historically Jewish neighborhood. The museum was founded in 1998, and though it does not have a permanent collection, it hosts several original and traveling exhibitions each year. The AJM aims to explore contemporary Jewish issues through art and related programs that facilitate intercultural dialogue.

== History ==
Prior to 1998, the JCC of Greater Pittsburgh had a small community gallery for nearly 25 years. Under the auspices of Leslie A. Golomb, the gallery underwent a period of substantial growth, evolving into a museum and receiving accreditation from the Council of American Jewish Museums (CAJM). Accreditation by CAJM requires strict adherence to standards regarding archives, catalogues, and curating, as well as educational programs and outreach.

Today, the AJM galleries are still located on the Pittsburgh JCC's Squirrel Hill campus. While the AJM continues to emphasize the Pittsburgh community in its exhibitions and programming, its scope has grown as it collaborates with regional, national, and international artists and organizations. Additionally, the AJM frequently explores Jewish themes such as contemporary iterations of rituals, but aims to reach the wider community though exhibits with broad appeal and programming that encourages interfaith discourse.

== Recent exhibitions ==
As a non-collecting museum, the AJM works with local, national, and international artists to create original exhibitions, and occasionally hosts traveling exhibitions from institutions such as the United States Holocaust Memorial Museum. Here is a list of recent, notable exhibitions:

- 2017: Hill District Paintings. Rochelle Blumenfeld
- 2011: Legacy. A Painter's Legacy: The Students of Samuel Rosenberg (artist)
- 2010: Between Heaven and Earth. Ilene Winn Lederer
- 2010: To Speak Her Heart. Leslie A. Golomb and Barbara Broff Goldman
- 2010: India: A Light Within. Charlee Brodsky
- 2010: I Thought I Could Fly. Charlee Brodsky
- 2009: Tempted, Misled, Slaughtered: The Short Life of Hitler Youth, Paul B. Presented through the Florida Holocaust Museum
- 2009: Body of Work: Philip Mendlow
- 2008-2009: Love/Fences/Nests. Ally Reeves, Ben Schacter, Anna Divinsky
- 2007-2008: Nazi Persecution of Homosexuals. Presented through the United States Holocaust Memorial Museum
- 2007: Of the Painted Image. Miriam Cabessa, Seth Cohen, Peter Rostovsky
- 2007: If My Eyes Speak. Adam Nadel
- 2006: Body in Diaspora. Maritza Mosquera
- 2006: 118-60 Metropolitan Avenue. Joan Linder
- 2004-2005: The Mikvah Project. Janice Rubin and Leah Lax
- 2004: QuilkLinks. Louise Silk and Pittsburgh teens
- 2003: From Home to Home: Jewish Immigration to America. Presented through the Children's Galleries for Jewish Culture (formerly the Jewish Children's Learning Lab)
- 2001: Encountering the Second Commandment. International group exhibition of 43 artists from eight countries
