= Samuel Rosenberg =

Samuel Rosenberg may refer to:

- Samuel Rosenberg (writer) (1912–1996), American writer and photographer
- Samuel I. Rosenberg (born 1950), American politician in the Maryland House of Delegates
- Samuel Rosenberg (artist) (1896–1972), American artist and professor
