= Johanna Woodwell Hailman =

American painter

- Born: Johanna Knowles Woodwell; 1871; Pittsburgh, Pennsylvania
- Died: 1958 (aged 86–87); Pittsburgh, Pennsylvania
- Known for: Painting

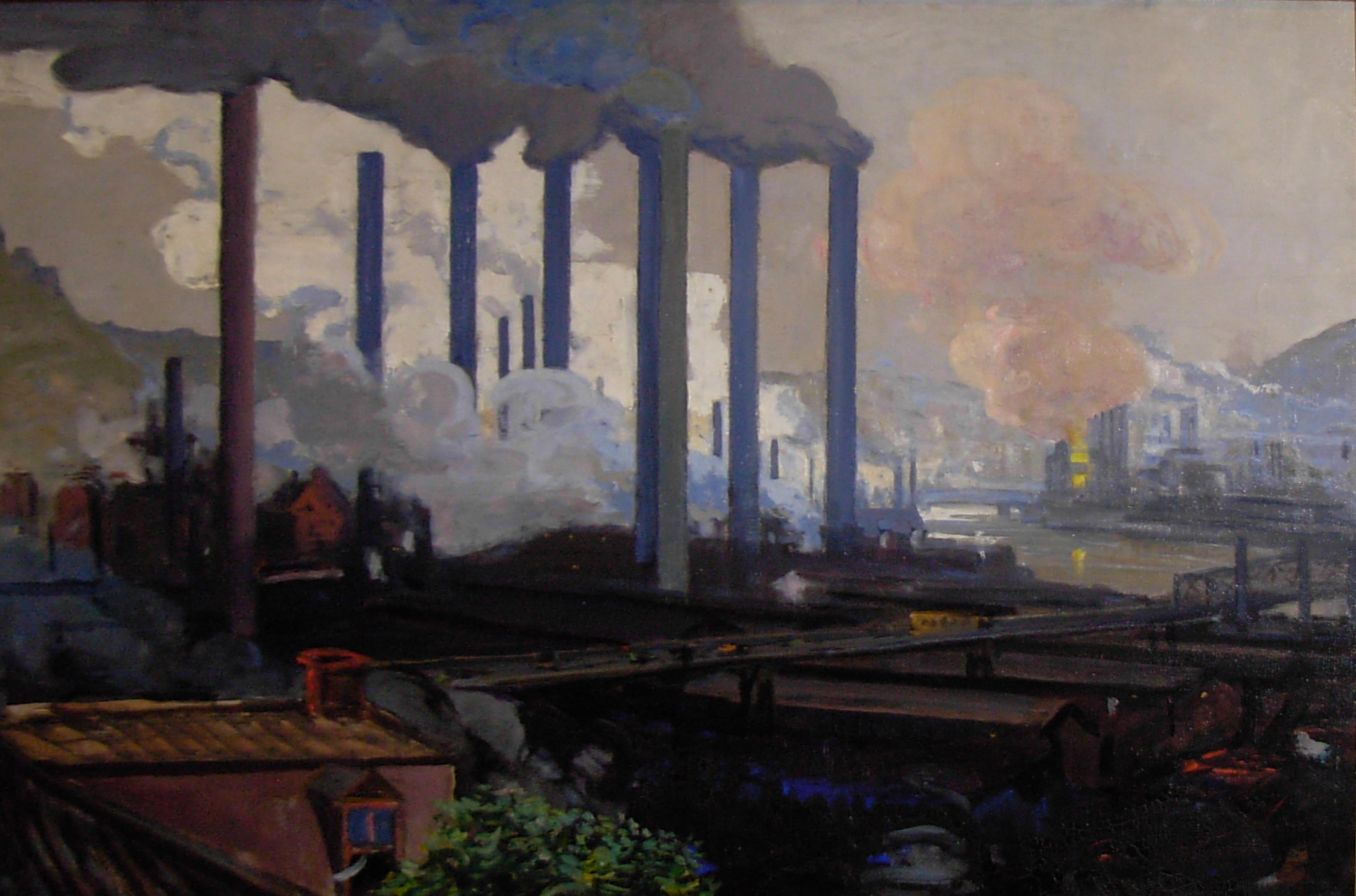
Jones and Laughlin Mill, Pittsburgh

Johanna Knowles Woodwell Hailman (1871–June 28, 1958) was an American painter known for her floral paintings and scenes of industrial Pittsburgh.

== Biography ==
Hailman née Woodwell was born in 1871 in Pittsburgh. She was the daughter of the Pennsylvania painter Joseph R. Woodwell. She was taught by her father and influenced by George Hetzel. She briefly attended the Pittsburgh School of Design.

Hailman was a member of the American Federation of Arts and the National Association of Women Painters and Sculptors.

Hailman exhibited her work at the Palace of Fine Arts at the 1893 World's Columbian Exposition in Chicago, as well as the 1904 Louisiana Purchase Exposition in St. Louis and the 1915 Panama Pacific Exhibition in San Francisco. She exhibited her art at the Carnegie International Annual Exhibition almost every year from 1896 to 1955.

Hailman died in 1958 in Pittsburgh. Her work is in the collection of the Carnegie Museum of Art.
