= Associated Artists of Pittsburgh =

Associated Artists of Pittsburgh (AAP) is the oldest, and largest nonprofit visual arts membership organization in Pittsburgh, Pennsylvania, United States, and the oldest continuously exhibiting visual arts organization in America.

== History ==
Associated Artists of Pittsburgh (AAP) was founded in 1910 to create opportunities for local artists to display their work and to foster an appreciation of visual art.

Membership is open to any artist within a 150-mile radius of Pittsburgh and who is over 18 years of age. Admittance is based on the quality of the applicant's work, as judged by the AAP Membership committee. Screenings are held twice yearly.

Past membership has included such well-known artists as Andy Warhol, Samuel Rosenberg (artist), John Kane, Mary Cassatt, Philip Pearlstein, Robert Qualters, Rochelle Blumenfeld, Elizabeth Shannon Phillips, and Aaron Harry Gorson.

== Exhibitions ==
The following is from the Associated Artists of Pittsburgh's First Annual Exhibition catalog from 1910:

The Associate Artists of Pittsburgh organized March 4, 1910.

Exhibitions will be held annually.

The society is designed to foster a love for the fine arts and a true appreciation of what Pittsburgh artists are doing. It owes the success of its first exhibition to the enthusiastic and practical co-operation of men and women in Greater Pittsburgh who are engaged in the creation of works of art, and the public spirit of Mr. Harry Davis, who volunteered the use of the Grand Opera House building as a place where the public may view the collection and become better acquainted with the talents of Pittsburgh artists.

The Second Annual Exhibition was held at the Carnegie Institute [now the Carnegie Museum of Art], with an Acknowledgment printed in the Second Annual Exhibition catalog as follows:

The Associated Artists of Pittsburgh desires to acknowledge its indebtedness to the Trustees of the Carnegie institute and its Director, Mr. John W. Beatty, for their courtesy in extending the use of the Galleries for this Exhibition.
