= David Blythe =

David Blythe may refer to:

- David Randy Blythe (born 1971), American vocalist
- David Gilmour Blythe (1815–1865), American artist
