= John Button (artist) =

American painter (1929–1982)

- Born: John Button; 1929; California, US
- Died: 12 December 1982 (aged 53); New York, US
- Known for: Oil and Watercolor painting

John Button (1929–12 December 1982) was an American artist, well known for his city-scapes. Educated at the University of California, Berkeley then moved to New York City in the early 1950s. He became friends with Fairfield Porter and Frank O'Hara and became part of the New York School of Painters and Poets.

Amid the frenzy of Abstract Expressionism, Button remained true to his interest in realism and is now most commonly associated with New York School artists such as Fairfield Porter, Jane Freilicher, and Alex Katz. Button was a fine draftsman and drew from life models throughout his career. However, little known are his sketches of male nudes – studio models from the School of Visual Arts, where Button taught, as well as personal acquaintances.

At one point Button was in a relationship with the poet James Schuyler. Button died of a heart attack in New York City on 12 December 1982.

== Exhibitions ==
- 2009 "John Button, Reflections on Light," Bernhard Goldberg Fine Arts, East Hampton, NY
- 2007-08 "John Button (1929-1982): Paintings and Drawing from the Estate," ClampArt, New York City
- 1995 "Mexico 1958," Fischbach Gallery, New York City
- 1994-95 "The City: New York Visions 1900-1995," ACA Galleries, Lizan-Tops Gallery, East Hampton, New York
- 1994-95 "New York Realism Past and Present," Odakyu Museum, Odakyu, Japan
- 1994-95 "New York Realism Past and Present," Kadoshima Dity Museum of Art, Tokyo, Japan
- 1994-95 "New York Realism Past and Present," Kitakyushu Municipal Museum of Art, Kitakyushu, Japan
- 1994-95 "New York Realism Past and Present," The Museum of Art Kintetsu, Osaka, Japan
- 1994-95 "New York Realism Past and Present," Fukushima Prefectural Museum of Art, Fukushima, Japan
- 1994-95 "New York Realism Past and Present," Tampa Museum of Art Tampa, Florida
- 1994-95 "Male Desire," Mary Ryan Gallery New York
- 1993 "The Collection: Porter's Circle," Parrish Art Museum, Southampton, New York
- 1993 "Excellence in Watercolor," New Jersey Center for Visual Arts, Summit, New Jersey
- 1992 "Studies Enroute," Benton Gallery, Southampton, New York
- 1991 "John Button’s New York," Fischbach Gallery, New York City
- 1990 "John Button," Fischbach Gallery, New York City
- 1989-90 "John Button: Retrospective Exhibition," Currier Gallery of Art, Manchester, New Jersey
- 1989-90 "John Button: Retrospective Exhibition," Stamford Museum and Nature Center, Stamford, Connecticut
- 1989-90 "John Button: Retrospective Exhibition," Rahr-West Art Museum, Manitowoc, Wisconsin
- 1989-90 "John Button: Retrospective Exhibition," Utah Museum of Fine Arts, Salt Lake City, Utah
- 1988 "The Face of the Land," Southern Alleghenies Museum of Art, Loretto, Pennsylvania
- 1985-87 "American Realism: Twentieth Century Drawings and Watercolors from the Glenn C. Janss Collection," Madison Art Center, Madison, Wisconsin
- 1985-87 "American Realism: Twentieth Century Drawings and Watercolors from the Glenn C. Janss Collection," Archer M. Huntington Art Gallery, University of Texas, Austin, Texas
- 1985-87 "American Realism: Twentieth Century Drawings and Watercolors from the Glenn C. Janss Collection," Mary and Leigh Block Gallery, Northwestern University, Evanston, Illinois
- 1985-87 "American Realism: Twentieth Century Drawings and Watercolors from the Glenn C. Janss Collection," Williams College Museum of Art, Williamstown, Massachusetts
- 1985-87 "American Realism: Twentieth Century Drawings and Watercolors from the Glenn C. Janss Collection," Akron Art Museum, Akron, Ohio
- 1985-87 "American Realism: Twentieth Century Drawings and Watercolors from the Glenn C. Janss Collection," San Francisco Museum of Modern Art, San Francisco, California
- 1985-87 "American Realism: Twentieth Century Drawings and Watercolors from the Glenn C. Janss Collection," DeCordova and Dana Museum and Park, Lincoln, Massachusetts
- 1986 "John Button: The Last Works," Fischbach Gallery, New York City
- 1985-86 "City Views: Panoramas to Particulars," CIGNA Museum and Art Collection, Philadelphia, Pennsylvania
- 1984 "John Button: Paintings and Gouaches," Visual Arts Museum, School of Visual Arts, New York City
- 1984 "John Button: An American Painter," The College Gallery, Keane College, Union, New Jersey
- 1984 "Art and Friendship: A Tribute to Fairfield Porter," Guild Hall Museum, East Hampton, New York
- 1982 "An Appreciation of Realism," Museum of Art, Munson-Williams-Proctor Institute, Utica, New York
- 1982 "Contemporary Realist Painting: A Selection, Museum of Fine Arts, Boston, Massachusetts
- 1980 Fischbach Gallery, New York City
- 1979 "New York Now," Phoenix Art Museum, Phoenix, Arizona
- 1978 Fischbach Gallery, New York City
- 1976 "A Selection of American Art: The Skowhegan School 1946-1976," Institute of Contemporary Art, Boston, Massachusetts
- 1976 "America 1976," Department of the Interior at the Cororan Gallery of Art, Washington, D.C.
- 1976 "John Button," Gallery of July and August, Woodstock, New York
- 1963-74 Kornblee Gallery, New York City
- 1973 "The Male Nude," Emily Lowe Gallery, Hofstra University, Hempstead, New York
- 1970 J.L. Hudson Gallery, Detroit
- 1969 "Contemporary Portraits," Museum of Modern Art, New York City
- 1968 "Realism Now," Vassar College Art Gallery, Poughkeepsie, New York
- 1967 Franklin Siden Gallery, Detroit, Michigan
- 1965 "Eight Landscape Painters," The International Council of the Museum of Modern Art, New York
- 1965 "Eight Landscape Painters," Festival Dei Due Mondi di Spoleto, Italy
- 1962 "Selections from the ARt Lending Service," Museum of Modern Art, New York
- 1955-59 Tibor de Nagy Gallery, New York City
- 1954-55 "Stable Annual," Stable Gallery New York
- 1952 "Annual Exhibition: Artist of Los Angeles and Vicinity," Los Angeles County Museum of Art, Los Angeles

== Public collections ==
Metropolitan Museum of Art, New York City; Museum of Modern Art, New York City; Columbia University, New York City; Grey Art Gallery, New York University, New York City; Whitney Museum of American Art, New York; Guild Hall Museum, East Hampton, New York; Parrish Art Museum, Southampton, New York; Hirshhorn Museum and Sculpture Garden, Washington, DC; San Francisco Museum of Modern Art, San Francisco; Oakland Museum, Oakland, California; Wadsworth Atheneum Museum of Art, Hartford, Connecticut; Colby College, Colby, Maine; Portland Museum of Art, Portland, Maine; Currier Gallery of Art, Manchester, New Hampshire; Newark Museum, Newark, New Jersey; Weatherspoon Art Gallery, University of North Carolina at Greensboro, North Carolina; Utah Museum of Fine Arts, Salt Lake City, Utah; Utah State University, Logan, Utah; Rahr-West Art Museum, Manitowoc, Wisconsin; Snite Museum of Art, University of Notre Dame, Indiana; Tampa Museum of Art, Tampa, Florida; Jersey City Museum, New Jersey; Long Island Museum, Stony Brook, New York; New York Public Library, New York City; Museum of the City of New York, New York City; Rhode Island School of Design, Providence, Rhode Island; St. Lawrence University, New York; University of Rochester, New York
