= Colleen Browning =

American painter (1918–2003)

- Born: Colleen Browning; 16 May 1918; Shoeburyness, England
- Died: 22 August 2003 (aged 85); New York City, New York, U.S.
- Known for: Painter
- Movement: Realism (art), Magic realism

Colleen Browning (16 May 1918 – 22 August 2003) was an Anglo-American realist and magical realist painter.

== Early life ==
Colleen Browning was born 16 May 1918 in Shoeburyness, Essex, England. As a child, Browning was a gifted artist. Her parents supported and encouraged her by enrolling her in the Farnham School of Arts in 1933. In 1934 she exhibited at the Women in Arts Society in London. In 1935 she attended the Salisbury School of Arts and Craft. In that year she also exhibited her drawings and paintings at the Whitechapel Gallery.

Browning attended London's Slade School of Art on a full scholarship from 1937 to 1939. In 1942, she worked as a mapmaker for the Royal Air Force during World War II. Browning later worked as a set designer in London for the Two Cities Film Studios, which was later to become the J. Arthur Rank Film Corporation. In 1948 Browning met the English writer Geoffrey Wagner while on vacation on the island of Ischia. They quickly decided to marry in America, where Wagner had been hired to teach at the University of Rochester. Toward the latter part of the 1940s she experimented with fantasy compositions inspired by Salvador Dali and other Surrealist leaders. She made the transition from theatrical work to easel painter toward the end of the 1940s

== Career ==
In 1949 she emigrated to the United States, arriving in New York City. There, she and Mr. Wagner lived on 116th Street and Second Avenue. It was there that she painted “Holiday,” looking down from her fourth-floor window, and “East Harlem Street Scene,” depicting the bustle of her neighborhood. In “Fire Escape II,” she arranged four children on the vertical structure of a fire escape Browning became an American citizen a year later. The artist lived in New York City for the next five decades. Browning was a major figure in the realism (arts) movement in New York City during a time when Abstract Realism and the art of Jackson Pollock was beginning to rise to prominence. In particular, Browning often painted New York City and scenes of urban life. For instance her painting Holiday (1951–52) depicts a street scene that Browning captured while living on 116th Street and Second Avenue in Manhattan. In 1952 she exhibited at the Whitney Museum of American Art. In 1953 she held a solo exhibition at the Edwin Hewitt Gallery in New York City.

In her later career, Browning created works in the style of magic realism that increasingly blurred the lines between the real and the imagined. In works such as Picture of a Painting of the Great Circus Parade (1988) and Black Umbrella (1970) the artist captures a real event but with a focus on the wonderful and a blurred sense of reality. A leader in the Modern and Post-Modern revivals of Realism in American art, Browning is a realist whose work defies attempts to categorize it. Her work is largely recognized for its superior command of materials and media and for her unwavering devotion to understanding the human condition.

Browning also taught art. She was a professor at Pratt Institute and the City College of New York. In 1977, she created a series set in the city’s graffiti-adorned subway cars. In each, dreamy and highly nuanced faces peer out of windows framed by the bold slashes of spray-painted designs. Then in the 1980s, she turned to the occult, painting clairvoyants and astrologers. In addition she taught at the National Academy of Design from 1978 to 1982.Her work was included in the National Academy of Design's yearly exhibitions, and she has exhibited at the Museum of Modern Art, the Whitney Museum of American Art, the Pennsylvania Academy of the Fine Arts, and the Kennedy Galleries in New York. Like many professional artists, Browning supplemented her income through commercial illustration and printmaking. This phase of her career is highlighted in SAMA-Johnstown's exhibition.

Browning died in New York City on 22 August 2003. According to her wishes, a substantial collection of her paintings was bequeathed to the Southern Alleghenies Museum of Art. The years since Ms. Browning’s death in 2003, at 85, have led to a reconsideration of her impact throughout the latter half of the 20th century. Her work, with an endowment to support its exhibition, was bequeathed by her husband’s estate to the Southern Alleghenies Museum of Art, which organized this traveling retrospective in conjunction with Philip Eliasoph, a professor of art history at Fairfield University and the author of “Colleen Browning: The Enchantment of Realism.”

== Recognition ==
Browning was a National Academician. She served on the Academy Council from 1969 to 1972.

Her work has been exhibited at the Whitney Museum of Art, the Pennsylvania Academy of Fine Arts, the Walker Art Gallery, the Cleveland Museum of Art, and the Carnegie Museums of Pittsburgh. During her lifetime, Browning's work was also reproduced in numerous publications, including Time, The New York Times, Newsweek and American Artist.

In 2013 a retrospective of the artist's work was organized at Fairfield University through Colleen Browning: The Early Works at the Bellarmine Gallery and Colleen Browning: A Brush with Magic at the Thomas J. Walsh Jr. Art Gallery. A Brush with Magic had already appeared in Ireland and New York City with dates in Connecticut, Ohio and Texas still to come. Her work has also been featured in articles in Time, Newsweek, Glamour, the New York Times, Arts Magazine, Art International, and American Artist.

Browning's brand of figurative painting, with subjects ranging from worshipers in a Guatemalan church to graffiti-covered Harlem subway cars to the still life Fruits and Friends (1978, Harmon-Meek Galleries, Naples, Fl.), displays affinities with both the SOCIAL REALISM of Jack Levine and the MAGIC REALISM of Philip Evergood and George Tooker. Nevertheless, Browning developed and maintains a wry, multi-hued personal stamp to her painting.

== Collections ==
- Detroit Institute of Arts
- Kalamazoo Institute of Arts
- The Milwaukee Art Center
- The Seattle Art Museum
- The St. Louis Art Museum
- The New York State Art Museum
- The National Museum of Women in the Arts
- Southern Alleghenies Museum of Art
- The National Academy of Design
