= Adam Nadel =

American photographer

- Born: 1967 (age 58–59)
- Education: University of Chicago
- Occupation: Photographer

Adam Nadel (born 1967) is an American photographer based in New York City.

Exhibitions of Nadel's work include If My Eyes Speak: Photographs by Adam Nadel (2007), which comprises 30 portraits of people involved in the Bosnian War, Rwandan genocide and war in Darfur; and Malaria: Blood, Sweat and Tears, a multi-media exhibition illustrating malaria's impact.

== Life and work ==
Nadel majored in anthropology at the University of Chicago and graduated in 1990.

Nadel was a New York City staff photographer for the Associated Press in the late 1990s, and has worked for Newsweek, Stern, The Sunday Telegraph, Time, The Times and The New York Times. The New York Times nominated his 2005 work in Iraq for a Pulitzer Prize.

According to David Stanger, director of the American Jewish Museum in Pittsburgh, Pennsylvania, Nadel's 2007 exhibition If My Eyes Speak: Photographs by Adam Nadel comprises 30 images representing "contemporary manifestations of genocide". Each long exposure portrait is 18 inches square and includes minimal background detail, and all are accompanied by excerpts from interviews with their subjects.

His exhibition Malaria: Blood, Sweat and Tears, conceived and produced by Nadel and the Malaria Consortium, opened in 2010 at the United Nations Headquarters in New York City and has been shown at nine venues on four continents. The exhibition deals with the relationships between malaria, poverty and the need to combat the disease. It includes more than 40 of Nadel's images, taken in locations including Nigeria, Uganda and Cambodia, which illustrate the effects of the disease on families, health workers, researchers and communities. Nadel said in 2010, "If you have a bunch of great pictures but they don't communicate the complexity and the important aspects of what you’re documenting, then what you have are powerful emotional photographs, but they won't offer you the possibility for education." Subjects include a Cambodian boy, a group of Nigerian men wearing gas masks and gloves and carrying spraying equipment, and a magnified mosquito's foot. Nadel also invited the Brazilian artist Kako to create a graphic novel depicting the process by which the disease is transmitted.

In 2017 Nadel's photographs of the Everglades, produced as part of a collaboration with the anthropologist Jessica Cattelino, were exhibited in Everglades National Park. In 2018 Nadel became that year's artist in residence at Fermilab, where his work was exhibited in 2019.

== Awards ==
- First Prize, 2005 World Press Photo contest, Portrait Story category
- First Prize, World Press Photo contest, Sports Feature category
- First Prize, Pictures of the Year International, News Story
- First Prize, Pictures of the Year International, Campaign 2004 Picture Story
- First Prize, Pictures of the Year International, Portrait Story
