= Rochelle Blumenfeld =

American artist

- Born: 1936 (age 89–90); Pittsburgh, Pennsylvania, U.S.
- Died: January 25, 2025; Pittsburgh, PA
- Education: Carnegie Mellon University
- Known for: Painting
- Movement: Abstract art
- Website: www.blumenfeldart.com

Rochelle Blumenfeld was an American artist from Pittsburgh, Pennsylvania. Her paintings have been exhibited in many public and private collections, including the Carnegie Museum of Art. Her work has been included in the Bicentennial Exhibit of “American Painters in Paris” in Paris, France, Copley Society of Art, Boston, Dunfermline Fife, Scotland, and the Westmoreland Museum of American Art, Greensburg, Pennsylvania.

== Biography ==
Rochelle Blumenfeld was born in Pittsburgh, Pennsylvania in 1936. Her grandparents were immigrants from the Soviet Union. Her father, Lawrence Reznik, was a sign painter, also making window displays. Blumenfeld's grandfather, Harry Fairman, was an artist and a decorator for the wealthy neighborhoods in the East End of Pittsburgh. He encouraged her to start painting and inspired her to pursue art.

Blumenfeld started taking art classes at the Carnegie Museum starting in 5th grade. In High School, she took an advanced art class in painting at the Carnegie Tech, which later became known as Carnegie Mellon University. After graduation, she applied and was accepted as a Painting and Design student at Carnegie Mellon University. She completed one year and left the university to get married. Blumenfeld missed painting, and she enrolled in a class at the Young Men and Women's Hebrew Association, which was taught by Samuel Rosenberg (artist), who also taught Andy Warhol. Samuel Rosenberg was a big influence on her future as a painter.

Rochelle Blumenfeld married Irving Blumenfeld in 1955. He was a co-founder of Gateway Paint Company in the Strip district of Pittsburgh. Together they had 3 children and 5 grandchildren.

== Life as an artist ==
Abstract Painting by Rochelle Blumenfeld - "Gathering"

Samuel Rosenberg (artist) introduced Blumenfeld to the world of abstract art. She was inspired by life around her to reflect and make statements in her paintings. Blumenfeld used bold colors, light, and movement in her art to express herself. She was inspired by the natural shapes of the world around her, and paintings represent a period of changes. The artist stated "Life continually alters its course on an unknown journey, and coping is not always easy".

In 1958, Rochelle Blumenfeld started exhibiting professionally, when she was accepted into the Associated Artists of Pittsburgh. This started a long career of exhibiting her work through the United States and Europe.

In the 1970s Rochelle Blumenfeld had a one-person show at the Carnegie Museum of Art. In 1976 her paintings were included in the Bicentennial Exhibition, “Americans in Paris”, Paris, France. Blumenfeld showed her work with the Associated Artists of Pittsburgh in Dunfermline Scotland to honor Andrew Carnegie at his birthplace.

In the 1990s, Blumenfeld started a series of paintings representing Jewish holidays and Shabbat. Some of her Judaica paintings were included in the Hallmark Cards "Tree of Life" series in 1999.

In 2000, Blumenfeld was inspired by seeing Revelations (Alvin Ailey), Alvin Ailey American Dance Theater. She wanted to keep and share her memories of the dance, which started a series of paintings she named "Celebration of Spirit". In 2004, in conjunction with the Three Rivers Arts Festival, she had a one-person show of her ballet paintings at the One Oxford Centre in Pittsburgh.

Cash Register - Hill District Paintings

In 2017 Blumenfeld exhibited "Hill District Paintings" which was very different from her other exhibits, as it tells a story of her family and the streets of the city where she grew up.

In 2011 Blumenfeld had a conversation with her grandchildren that inspired the artist to use her paintings to recreate memories of diverse neighborhood with people of different ethnic backgrounds, all struggling to make a living during the Great Depression and World War II. Her grandson wanted to know where the cash register came from that he played with. Blumenfeld said that the cash register came from her grandfather's store on Logan Street, Pittsburgh. It came to her house after the store closed. Cash register became her first painting in this series. Painting the cash register triggered her other memories and she completed a total of 14 Hill District Paintings. The last painting in the series is her memory of a patriotic parade on Fifth Avenue during World War II, honoring the soldiers.

Blumenfeld's "Hill District Paintings" were included in the documentary by Kenneth Love "Jewish Memories of the Hill District". Her grandfather Sam Reznik ran a store on Logan Street, where clothes hung from the ceiling.

In 2020 Blumenfeld was included in the Master Visual Artists VII: Preserving the Legacy exhibition. It was hosted at the Heinz History Center of Pittsburgh in partnership with the Master Visual Artists Project – a local group dedicated to recognizing the lifelong achievements of influential artists in Southwestern Pennsylvania. The featured artists stories were documented to be preserved for future generations.

== Publications ==
Blumenfeld's work has been published by Hallmark Cards, Kennedy Publishing, Allied Publications, and Hachai Publishing.

== Awards ==
As a member of the Associated Artists of Pittsburgh, Rochelle Blumenfeld received many awards including a Carnegie Museum of Art purchase award for their permanent collection in 1960.,

In 1966, Blumenfeld won first prize in a nationwide art contest, sponsored by Enjay Chemical Company.
