= Aaron Harry Gorson =

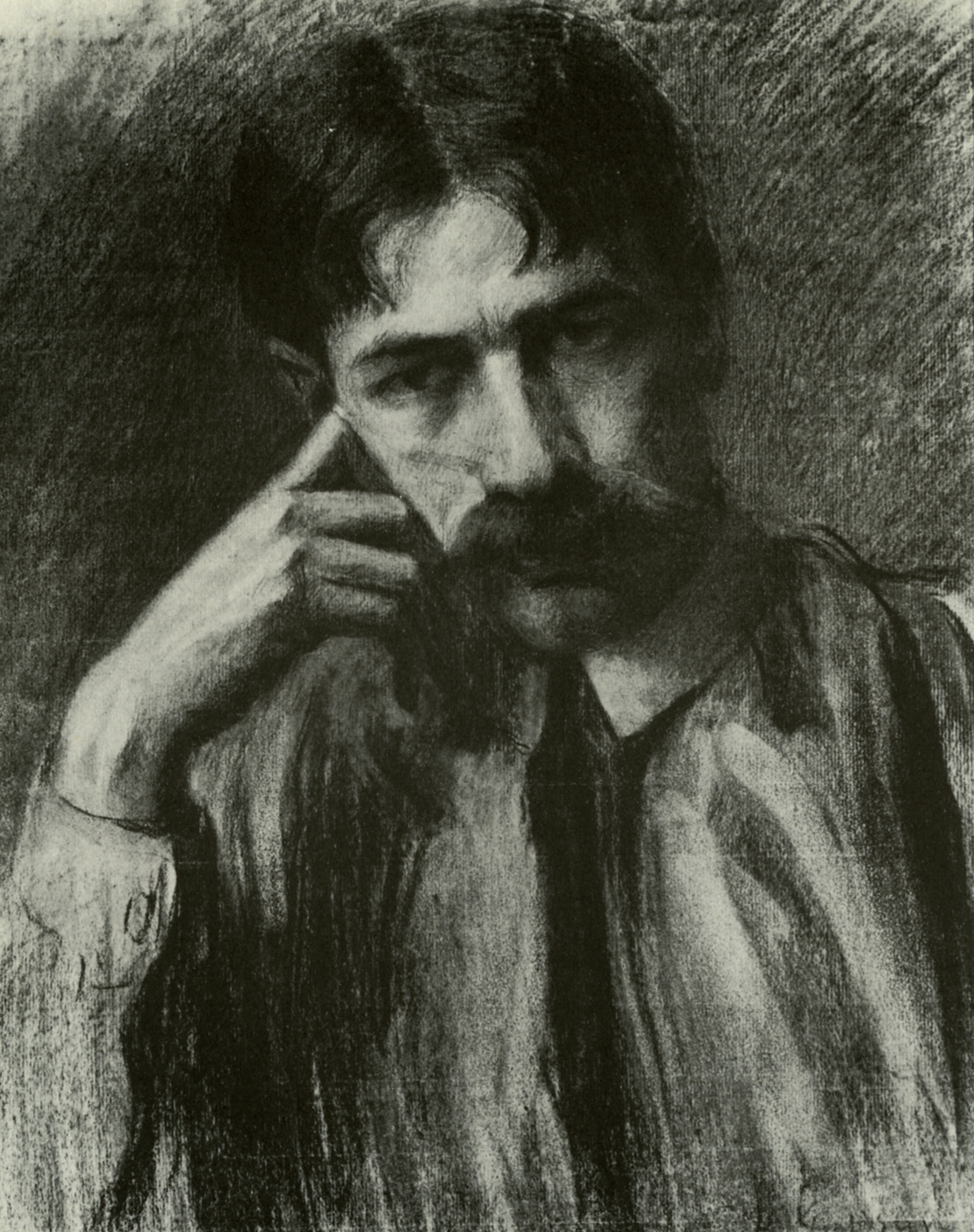
- Selfportrait, 1900

Aaron Harry Gorson (2 June 1872 in Kovno, Russian Empire – 11 October 1933 in New York City) was an American artist.

== Life ==
He immigrated to the United States, in Philadelphia, in 1888. He studied at the Pennsylvania Academy of Fine Arts, in 1894–1896 and 1897–1898, where he studied with Thomas Anshutz. He studied at the Académie Julian, in 1900, École des Beaux-Arts, and Académie Colarossi.

His work appeared in the 1902 exhibition of the Pennsylvania Academy of Fine Arts. He moved to Pittsburgh. In 1921, he moved to New York City.

His work is in the Carnegie Museum of Art, Kresge Art Museum, the Westmoreland Museum of American Art, the Newark Museum, the Worcester Art Museum, the Heckscher Museum of Art, and the Pennsylvania State University Art Gallery.

In 1993 he had a retrospective exhibition at the Westmoreland Museum.

His scrapbooks are microfilmed at the Archives of American Art.
