= Westmoreland Museum of American Art =

The Westmoreland Museum of American Art
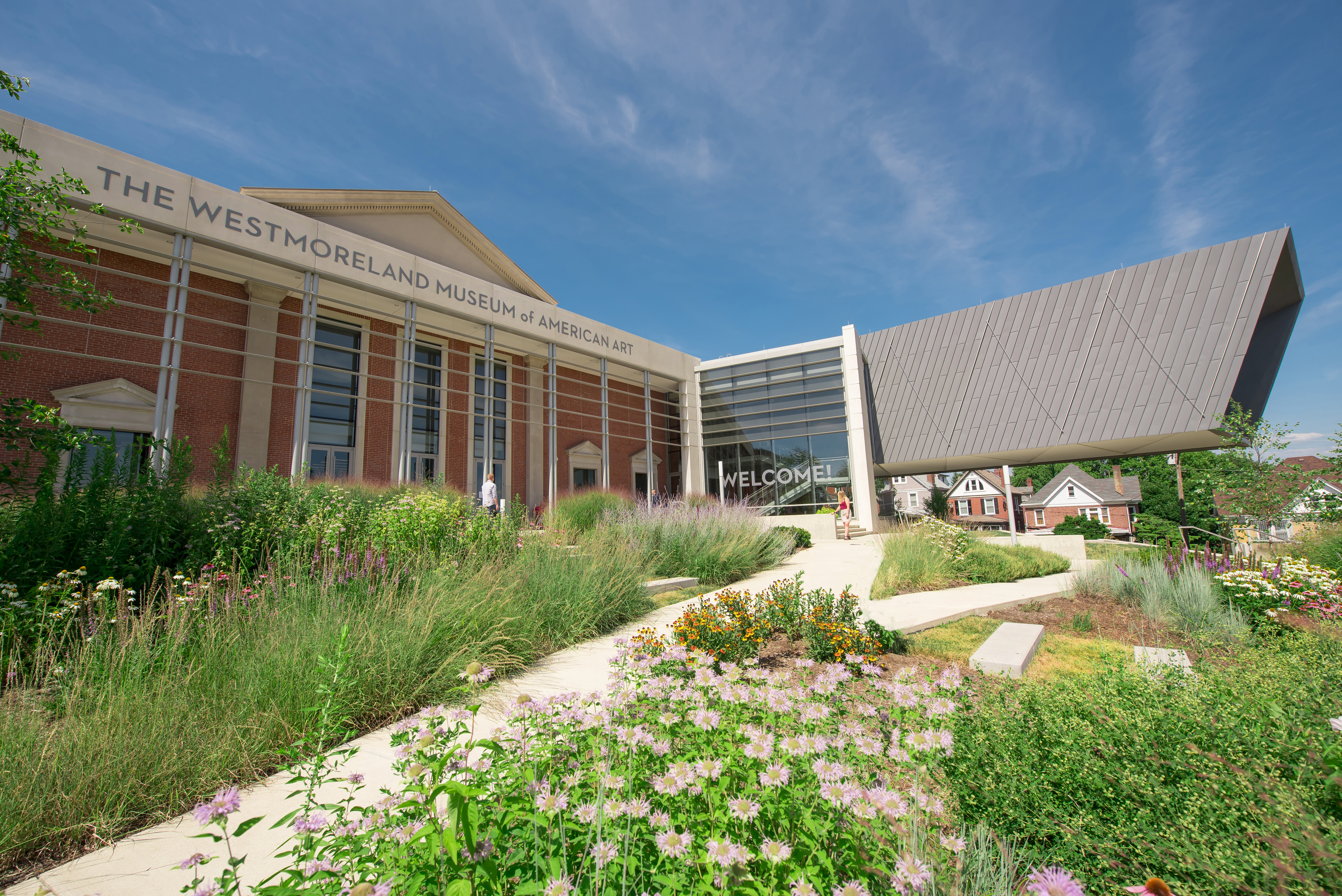
- The Westmoreland Museum of American Art exterior
- Established: 1959
- Location: Greensburg, Pennsylvania, U.S.
- Coordinates: 40.3060°N 79.5448°W
- Type: Art museum
- Accreditation: AAM
- Collections: American art & sculpture
- Founder: Mary Marchand Woods
- Director: Silvia Filippini-Fantoni (since 2023)
- Architect: Ennead Architects
- Employees: 26
- Public transit access: N Main St + Park St (Museum) WCTA
- Parking: On site (no charge)
- Website: thewestmoreland.org

The Westmoreland Museum of American Art is an art museum in Greensburg, Pennsylvania devoted to American art, with a particular concentration on the art of southwestern Pennsylvania.

== History ==
Art lover and Greensburg resident Mary Marchand Woods handed down her entire estate to establish The Woods Marchand Foundation in 1949. The museum developed from this foundation, opening ten years later on May 29, 1959.

The museum has expanded several times, beginning with a west-wing addition in 1968. In 2015, the museum reopened after two years of major renovations to expand, and modernize its facilities. The expansion added 13,287 square feet to its original 30,000 square feet area, where a cantilevered wing was added for exhibitions.

William H. Gerdts wrote that

... in western Pennsylvania the Westmoreland Museum of Art in Greensburg, rather than the Carnegie Institute in Pittsburgh, has pioneered regional investigations.

One feature of the museum is a Tim Prentice kinetic sculpture installed on the south facade.

== Selected artists represented in the permanent collection ==
- Sharif Bey
- Tina Williams Brewer
- Mary Cassatt
- John Singleton Copley
- Stuart Davis
- Ron Donoughe
- Thomas Eakins
- Mary Regensburg Feist
- Harriet Whitney Frishmuth
- Vanessa German
- Aaron Harry Gorson
- William Harnett
- Charles Harris (photographer)
- Childe Hassam
- George Hetzel
- Winslow Homer
- Thomas Hovenden
- Otto Kuhler
- George Luks
- Paul Manship
- John Harvey McCracken
- Thaddeus Mosley
- Rembrandt Peale
- John Singer Sargent
- Richard Allen Stoner
- Gilbert Stuart
- Mickalene Thomas
- Louis Comfort Tiffany
- Benjamin West

== Gallery ==
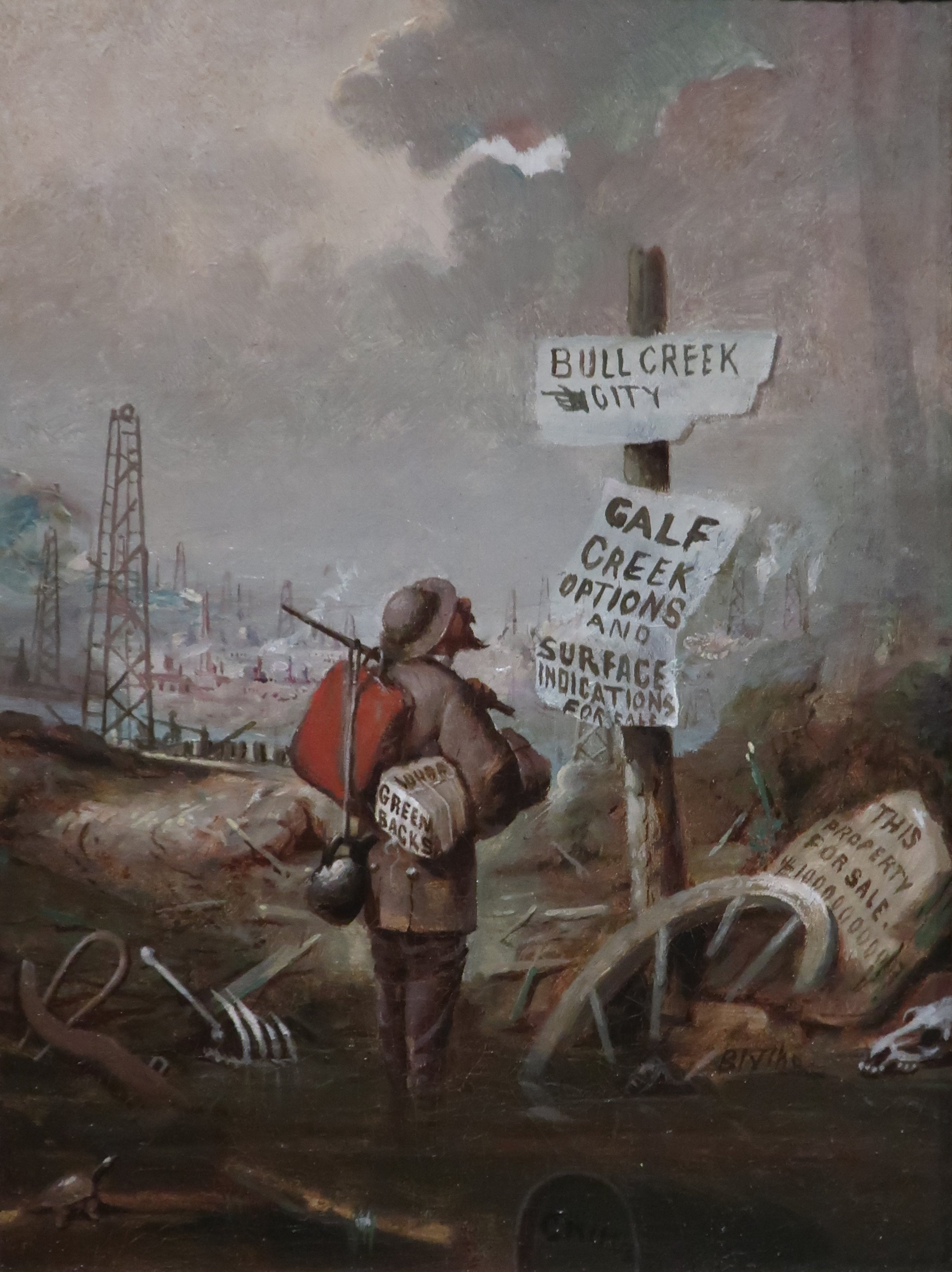
BLYTHE, David Gilmour, Prospecting, Bullcreek City (c.1861-63)

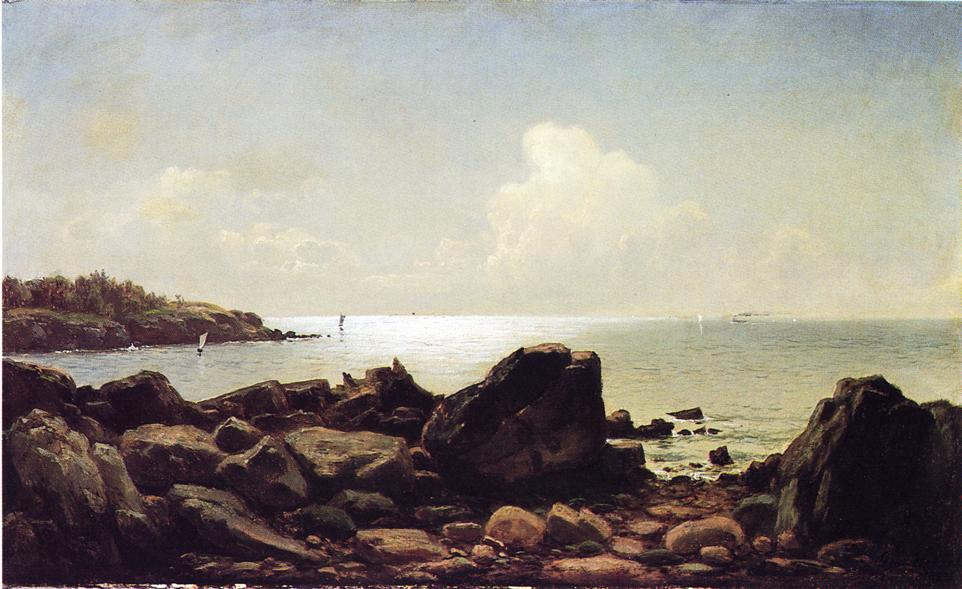
HETZEL, George, Rocky Inlet, Maine (1883)

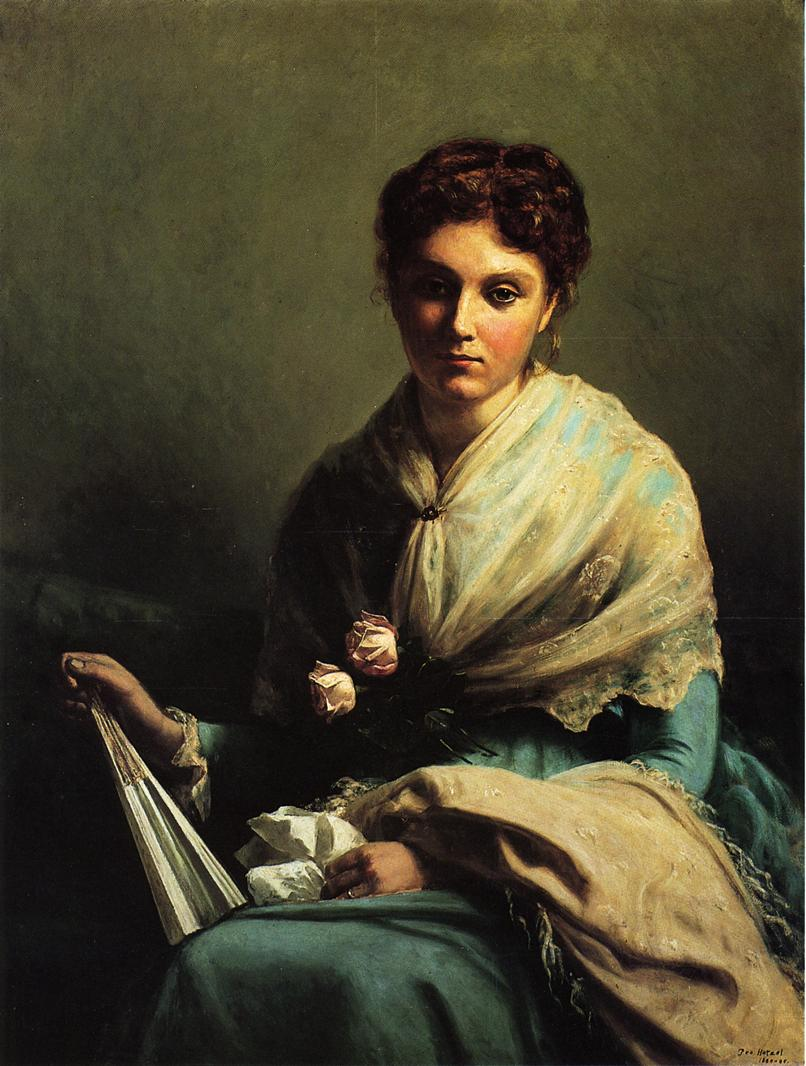
HETZEL, George, Portrait of Miss Helen Leslie Myers (c.1884-85)

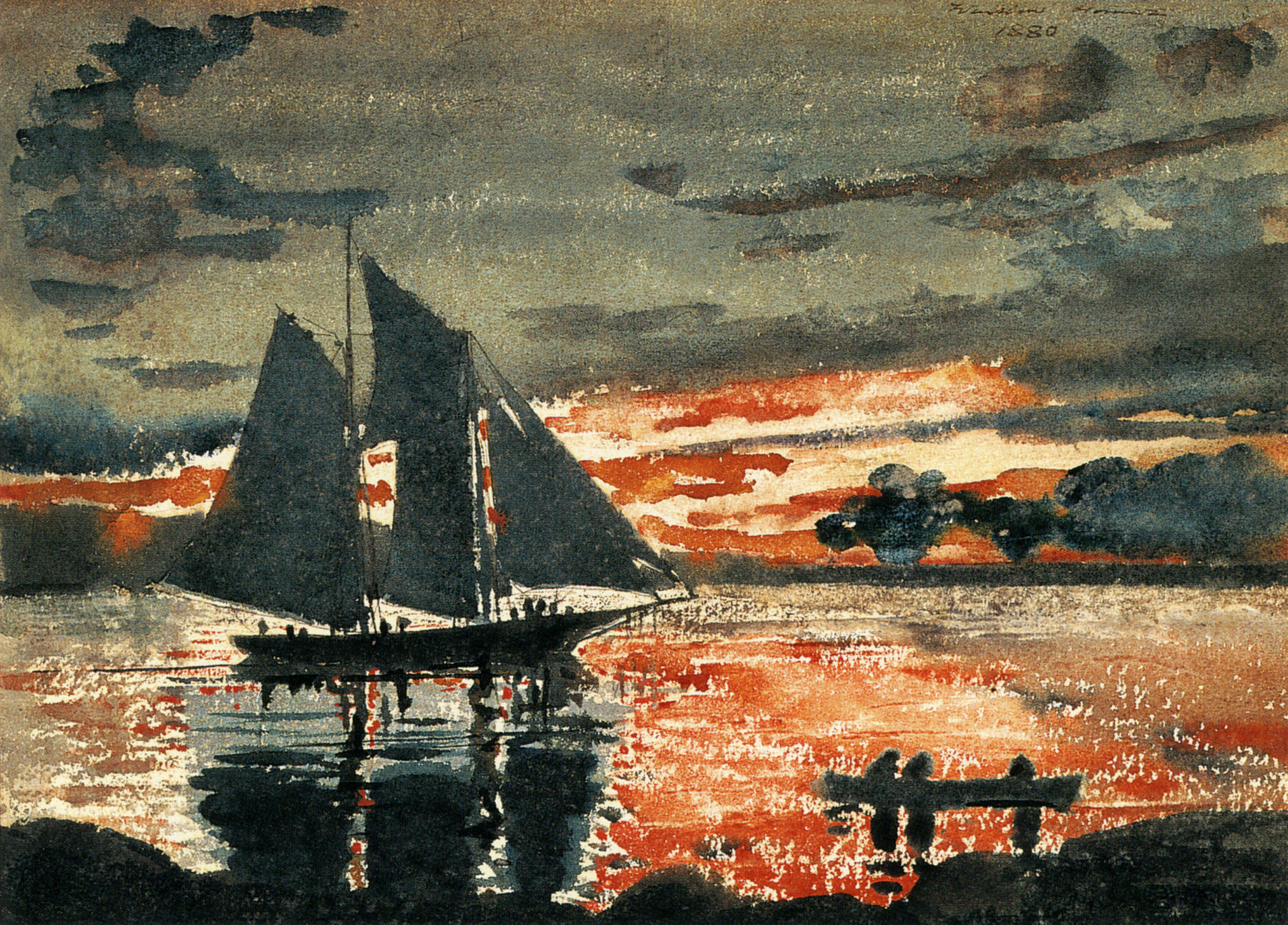
HOMER, Winslow, Sunset Fires (1880)

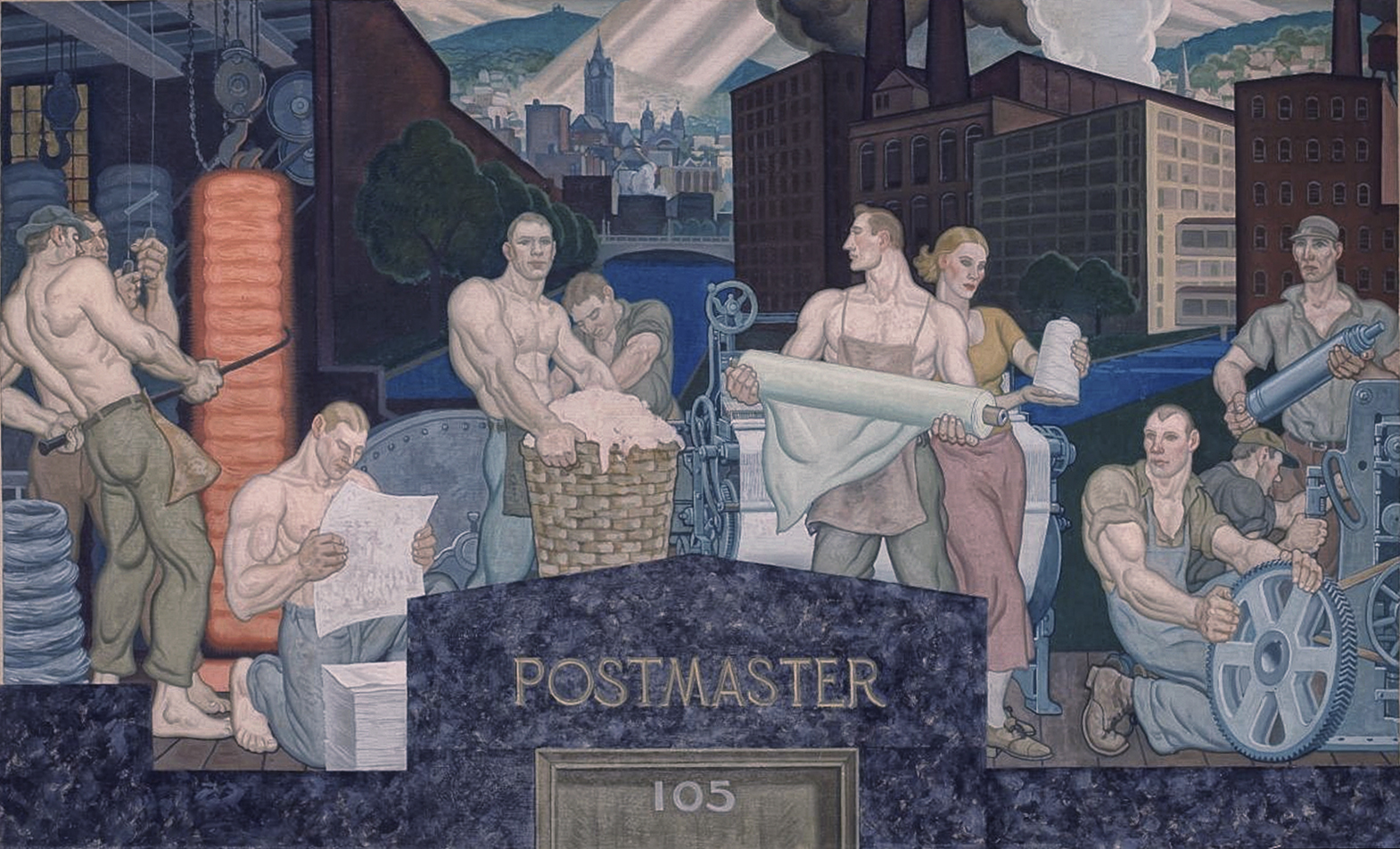
RIPLEY, Aiden Lassell, Industries of Holyoke, Massachusetts (1935), study for a post office mural
