= Geoffrey Wagner (writer) =

Geoffrey Atheling Wagner (27 December 1927 – 21 August 2006) was an English–American scholar and writer. He has published numerous books exploring subjects such as feminism in literature, the life and work of English writer Wyndham Lewis, and the consequences of the Grenadian Revolution. Wagner is a professor emeritus of English and the Humanities at the City College of New York.

== Life and education ==
Born in England in 1927, Wagner earned a degree from the college of Christ Church at Oxford University. In 1948, the writer met his future wife, the magical realist painter Colleen Browning, while on vacation in the Gulf of Naples. Nine months later, the couple married and moved to the United States, eventually settling in New York City, where Wagner taught at the City College of New York.

Geoffrey Wagner died on 21 August 2006, at the age of 78.

== Work ==
=== Non-fiction ===
Wagner wrote several non-fiction books and translated works of the French writer Charles Baudelaire into English.

==== List of non-fiction books ====
- Parade of Pleasure: A Study of Popular Iconography in the U.S.A. (1955)
- On the Wisdom of Words (1968)
- Wagner, Geoffrey Atheling; Radner, Sanford R. (1974). Language & Reality: A Semantics Approach to Writing. Crowell. ISBN 978-0-690-00494-6.
- The Novel and Cinema (1975)
- The End of Education (1976)

=== Fiction ===
- The Asphalt Campus (1963)
- The Sands of Valor (1967)
- Axel (1968)
- Innocent Grove (1971)
- A Singular Passion (1994)

Wagner also published writings in numerous American and British publications, including The Hudson Review and The Atlantic.
