= Elizabeth Shannon Phillips =

American painter (1911–1997)

- Born: February 27, 1911; Pittsburgh, Pennsylvania, U.S.
- Died: June 14, 1997 (aged 86); North Branford, Connecticut, U.S.
- Other name: Elizabeth Phillips Heller
- Education: Carnegie Mellon University, Art Students League of New York
- Occupations: Painter, watercolorist, muralist, newspaper editor
- Spouse: Franklin M. Heller (m. 1939–1997; her death)
- Children: 1
- Awards: Louis Comfort Tiffany Foundation (1933)

Elizabeth Shannon Phillips (1911–1997), also known as Elizabeth Phillips Heller, was an American painter, watercolorist, and muralist.

== Early life and education ==
Elizabeth Shannon Phillips was born in 1911, in Pittsburgh, Pennsylvania, to parent William Shannon Phillips. Her sister Peggy Philips was also an artist.

Phillips graduated in 1933 from Carnegie Mellon University (formerly Carnegie Institute of Technology); and continued her fine art studied at the Art Students League of New York. After graduation in 1933, Phillips won a fellowship from the Louis Comfort Tiffany Foundation.

In 1939, she married actor Franklin M. Heller of Manhattan, who was her classmate at Carnegie Mellon. He went on to work as the director of the television game show series, What's My Line? from 1950 to 1967. Together they had one daughter, born in 1944.

== Career ==
Phillips was a member of the Associated Artists of Pittsburgh. After her marriage she settled in Connecticut and edited the Stratford Weekly newspaper.

In 1933, she had a still life painting of an ink bottle, a bag of tobacco, and a pair of shears included in the Hotel Schenley exhibition of Pittsburgh artists. Her painting, Sunday Morning in the Park won accolades at the Associated Artists of Pittsburgh's annual show in 1936.

Phillips was commissioned by the U.S. Treasury Department's Section of Painting and Sculpture to paint a post office mural, Crossing of the West River, 1648 (November 1937) in West Haven, Connecticut, depicting local settlers on horses to the area of West River.

She was commissioned for a mural at the U.S. Post Office in Roaring Spring, Pennsylvania titled, Mountain Landscape (1942). That mural depicted the local scenery and nature.

Phillips died from complications from pneumonia on June 14, 1997, in North Branford, Connecticut. Her husband Franklin died less than a month after her in the summer of 1997.

== See also ==
- List of Federal Art Project artists
