= Tsugio Hattori =

American painter

- Born: 1951; Kagoshima, Japan
- Died: 10 August 1998 (aged 46–47); New York, United States
- Known for: Drawing, Painting
- Movement: Abstract expressionism, Post-Modernism

Tsugio Hattori (1951 – August 10, 1998) was an American abstract painter.

== Early life ==
Tsugio Hattori was born in Kagoshima, Japan, in 1951. Hattori studied mechanical engineering and technical illustration at Kagoshima National College of Technology in 1972. Afterwards, he went to Tokyo and attended Musashino Art University. He graduated from the Univ in 1980. Hattori continued his studies at The Art Students League of New York. Thinking of Oriental impression, he expressed the impression mixed the cultural background that he could remember with abstractly what kind of thing is the Oriental memory in the foreign country. Hattori's abstract forms are related to Chinese hieroglyph or the afterimage received from the style of type, and have a nuance that composed those elements and some balances by his sense. His early works were oil paintings, but he used acrylic paints in U.S.A.

== Career ==
Hattori immigrated to the United States in 1987. His paintings are in the collections of Bergen Museum of Art & Science, NJ, Muscarelle Museum of Art, VA, and Museo de Arte Contemporanea, Madeira, Portugal, to name a few, and have appeared in television programs on ABC and Fox. A number of his images were selected by UNICEF for publication in Europe in 1995 and 1997. In 1997, The Bergen Museum held the first retrospective of his inspirational work. He died on August 10, 1998, at the age of 46 years old. At the time of his death Hattori resided in Tappan, NY, and was a dedicated faculty member at the Art Center of Northern New Jersey, teaching abstract painting and composition.

== Publications ==
- 1998 Retrospective Catalogue of Hattori Published by The Bergen Museum of Art & Science, NJ.
- 1997 Reviewed by Takako Kasai, Contributing Editor, Yomiuri America, NY.
- 1997 Five images of Hattori's work selected by UNICEF for Publication in Europe.
- 1996 Reviewed by Miyoko Fukazawa, Contributing Editor, OCS News, NY.
- 1996 Reviewed by Takako Kasai, Contributing Editor, Yomiuri America, NY.
- 1996 Reviewed by Gerrit Henry, Contributing Editor, Art in America, March Issue.
- 1995 Silk Road I selected by UNICEF for greeting card publication.
- 1995 Two posters of Hattori's works appeared in TV Programs on ABC and Fox.
- 1995 Reviewed by Gerrit Henry, Contributing Editor, ARTnews, February Issue.
- 1994 Catalogue of Hattori published by the Reece Galleries, NY.
- 1994 Essay by Laura Berger, Contributing Editor, ARTnews.
- 1994 Appeared in the Catalogue of Southern Alleghenies Museum of Art, "American Abstraction; A New Decade".
- 1994 Appeared in the Catalogue of Bruce Mcgaw Graphics, NY.
- 1993 Five posters of Hattori's work published by Bruce Mcgaw Graphics, NY.
- 1992 Yabusame appeared in the catalogue of Art Expo in Miami, FL.
- 1991 Shi-On appeared on the front cover of Art Speak, NY.
- 1990 Azalea appeared in Merrill Lynch ads.
- 1986 Azalea appeared on front cover of Back Stage, Section B.
- 1985 P-Red appeared and reviewed on front cover of Art Speak, NY.

== Public collections ==
His work is included in the collections of the Muscarelle Museum of Art, Virginia and the Museu de Arte Contemporanea in Madeira, Portugal.
