= Samuel Rosenberg (artist) =

American painter (1896–1972)

- Born: 1896; Philadelphia, Pennsylvania
- Died: 1972 (aged 75–76); Pittsburgh, PA, U.S.
- Education: Columbian Council School, Pittsburgh, PA
- Known for: Painting
- Movement: Portraiture, Regionalism, abstract

Samuel Rosenberg (1896–1972) was an American artist and Professor at Carnegie Mellon University in Pittsburgh, PA. He showed his work at the Museum of Modern Art, the Whitney Museum in New York, the National Academy of Art in Washington, the Corcoran Gallery, and in the Pennsylvania Academy of Fine Arts. He was a beloved art teacher, and some of his students were Mel Bochner, Philip Pearlstein and Andy Warhol.

== Early life ==
Samuel Rosenberg's parents immigrated from Austria-Hungary. His mother saw that he was interested in art early on, and she enrolled him in the Columbian Council School, which later became known as the Irene Kaufmann Settlement. Rosenberg also took art lessons from Jacob R. Coblens, who was an artist from Paris, but working in Pittsburgh. During those lessons, Rosenberg learned to draw from memory. Samuel Rosenberg spent one year at the National Academy of Design in New York, and then he came back to live in Pittsburgh. When the World War I started, he did a tour of duty in the U.S. Army.

== Life as an artist ==
Samuel Rosenberg started his career by painting portraits. He painted a Self-Portrait in 1919, which showed he was a confident young artist and his use of light in his paintings. In 1920 he had his first exhibition in the Carnegie International. During 1930s, Rosenberg's paintings were portraying the happiness and difficulties of life of the black and Jewish neighborhoods in the Hill District. He also painted scenes of the city, which was inspired by Pittsburgh's big hills, dirty air, uneven houses built on the hills, and the gloomy tones around him. His painting, "Eviction", of 1935, shows the impact how the Depression affected residents of the Hill District. He liked being part of the Pittsburgh community, and he used many of his paintings to show how Pittsburgh looked like before redevelopment. After World War II started, Rosenberg started to paint allegorical scenes, where he used Jewish signs. In his paintings, the artist shows human misery during the war and the events of the Holocaust. He portrayed persecution of Jews in Europe. In the 1950s, his paintings became more abstract, where he liked using light, colors, and shapes. Samuel Rosenberg painted for almost six decades in the twentieth century, during the Great Depression, and 2 World Wars. He made over 500 paintings during his 57-year career.

== Teaching career ==
In 1917, Samuel Rosenberg started the Neighborhood Art School at the Irene Kaufmann Settlement.

From 1924-1965, he taught at the Carnegie Institute of Technology (now Carnegie Mellon University)

From 1926-1964, he taught adult classes at the Young Men and Women’s Hebrew Association

From 1937-1945, he directed the art department at the Pennsylvania College for Women, now Chatham University.

His students remember him as a professor who let them have the freedom of expression. Some of his students were Mel Bochner, Philip Pearlstein, Andy Warhol, Lois Katz Blaufeld, Rochelle Blumenfeld, Aaronel deRoy Gruber, Jane Haskell, Virginia Holzman, Anita Freund Morganstern and Abe Weiner. Rosenberg saved Andy Warhol from being expelled from Carnegie Tech in 1947.

To honor the memory of a talented artist and a professor, Carnegie Mellon School of Art presents Samuel Rosenberg Art Award to outstanding students

== Shows and awards ==
Samuel Rosenberg exhibited his art nationally. His work was included in renowned exhibits, such as San Francisco's Golden Gate Exposition and 1939 New York World's Fair, and his paintings were selected by the Whitney Museum of American Art for inclusion in their early biennials. He showed his work at the Museum of Modern Art, the Corcoran Gallery, the Pennsylvania Academy of Fine Arts. He had 2 solo shows at the Carnegie Museum of Art, and he participated in every Carnegie International exhibition from 1933 to 1967. In 1935 Rosenberg was a recipient of Carnegie Institute Prize.

In 1960, the Westmoreland County Museum of Art (now the Westmoreland Museum of American Art) organized Samuel Rosenberg, a retrospective exhibition of 116 paintings. In 2003 the Westmoreland Museum of American Art organized the exhibition Samuel Rosenberg: Portrait of a Painter with accompanying catalog of the same name. Concurrent to the exhibition were 2 exhibitions featuring The Students of Samuel Rosenberg.

In 2009 exhibit of his students work: A Painter's Legacy, at the American Jewish Museum at the Jewish Community Center of Greater Pittsburgh, people paid tribute to his legacy and witnessed the influence of his art on his students.

== Media about Rosenberg ==
Samuel Rosenberg: Pittsburgh’s Painter Laureate (2008) provided a timeline of Rosenberg’s art progress over the years. Former students and relatives provided interviews.

Samuel Rosenberg: Portrait of a Painter is a biography of Rosenberg written by Barbara Jones in 2003.

== Family life ==
Samuel Rosenberg met his future wife, Libbie Levin (1898–1987) in the Hill District Library. She worked as a clerk there. Their only son, Murray Z. Rosenberg (1925–1996), became a medical doctor in Connecticut and he was also an artist, mostly drawing illustrations.
