= George Hetzel =

American painter

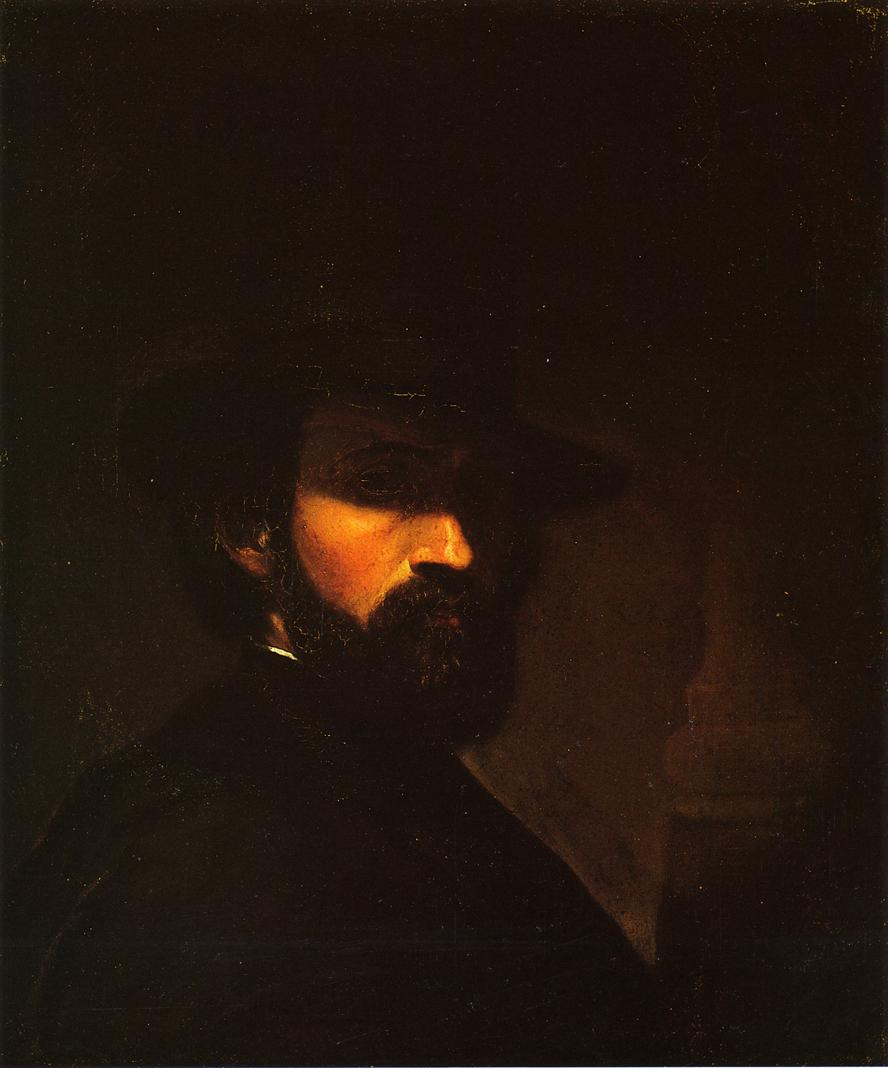
Self-portrait (c.1850), Westmoreland Museum of American Art

George Hetzel (January 17, 1826 – July 4, 1899) was a French-born American artist. He is regarded as the founder of the Scalp Level School of painting, a contemporary to the French Barbizon School of Naturalist painting. He is associated with the Düsseldorf school of painting.

== Life and work ==
Born in an ethnically mixed part of Alsace, France, on January 17, 1826; Hetzel's family spoke primarily German and emigrated to the United States when he was aged two. They traveled from a Baltimore port to a neighborhood in Allegheny City (Deutschtown), in Pittsburgh, Pennsylvania. Hetzel attended Allegheny City school and was apprenticed to a local sign- and house-painter. After four years' training, he earned an artisan's apprenticeship, painting the interior murals of riverboat public rooms and local Pittsburgh saloons. George Hetzel's daughter Lila Hetzel also studied art in Pittsburgh, Pennsylvania at the Pittsburgh School of Design.

George was sent to the Kunstakademie Düsseldorf between 1847–49 and studied Da Vinci's Chiaroscuro (the use of light and dark shadows to heighten depth and drama), which became a signature stroke in his later works.

It is thought that Hetzel was first introduced to the bucolic setting of Scalp Level (at the intersection of Paint Creek and Little Paint Creek outside of Johnstown, Pennsylvania) around 1866 during a fishing trip. He was then an instructor at the Pittsburgh School of Design for Women and encouraged his colleagues and students to make Scalp Level their summer retreat and work "en plein air".

Hetzel exhibited at the National Academy of Design in New York City from 1865 to 1882; and at the Pennsylvania Academy of the Fine Arts in Philadelphia from 1855 to 1890. His work was included in the 1876 Centennial Exposition in Philadelphia, and shown in the first Carnegie International in Pittsburgh in 1896. He also exhibited at the World's Columbian Exposition, 1892-1893. The J. J. Gillespie Gallery sold his works and he kept an independent studio. His career was established before the Scalp Level works, but they are currently foremost in his legacy.

== Other Scalp Level artists ==
Associated Artists include A. F. King, Clarence Johns, E. A. Poole, Charles Linford Fred Bussman, A. S. Wall, Joseph R. Woodwell, Bryan Wall, George Lang, C. C. Millor, John Wesley Beatty, Horation Stevenson, John A. Hermann Jr., Jeannette Frances Agnew, Anna W. Henderson, Rachael Henderson, Carrie S. Holmes, Annie Christina, Olive Turney, Bessie Wall, Agnes C. Way, and Alfred S. Wall.

== Work examples ==
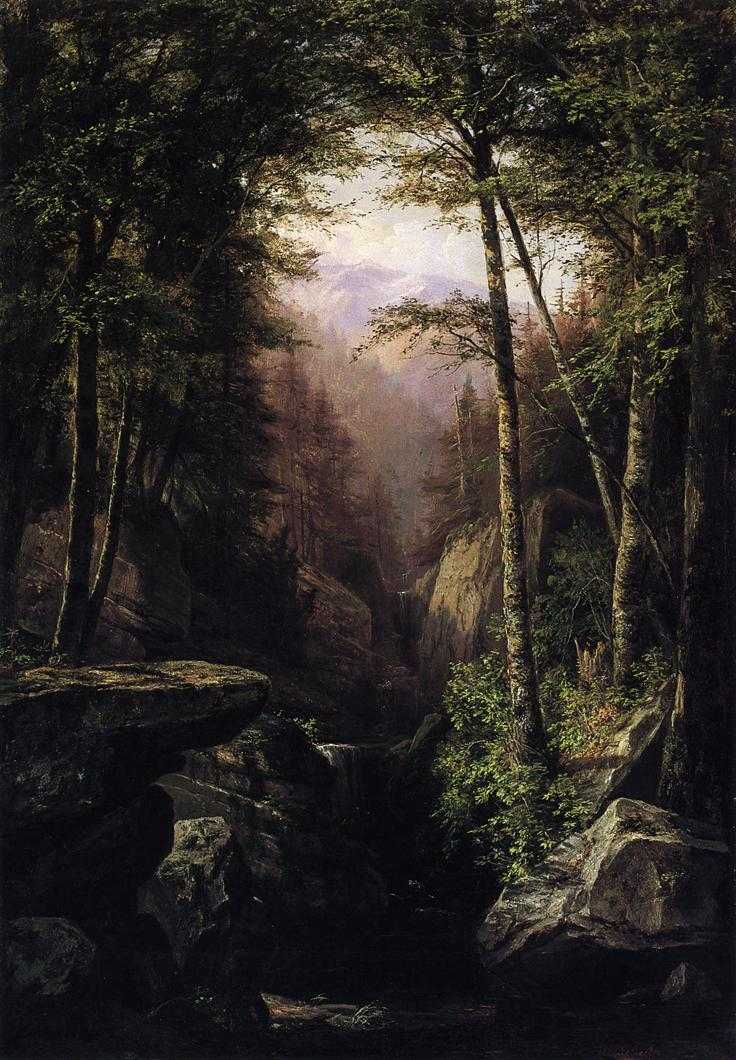
Rocky Gorge (1869), Westmoreland Museum of American Art

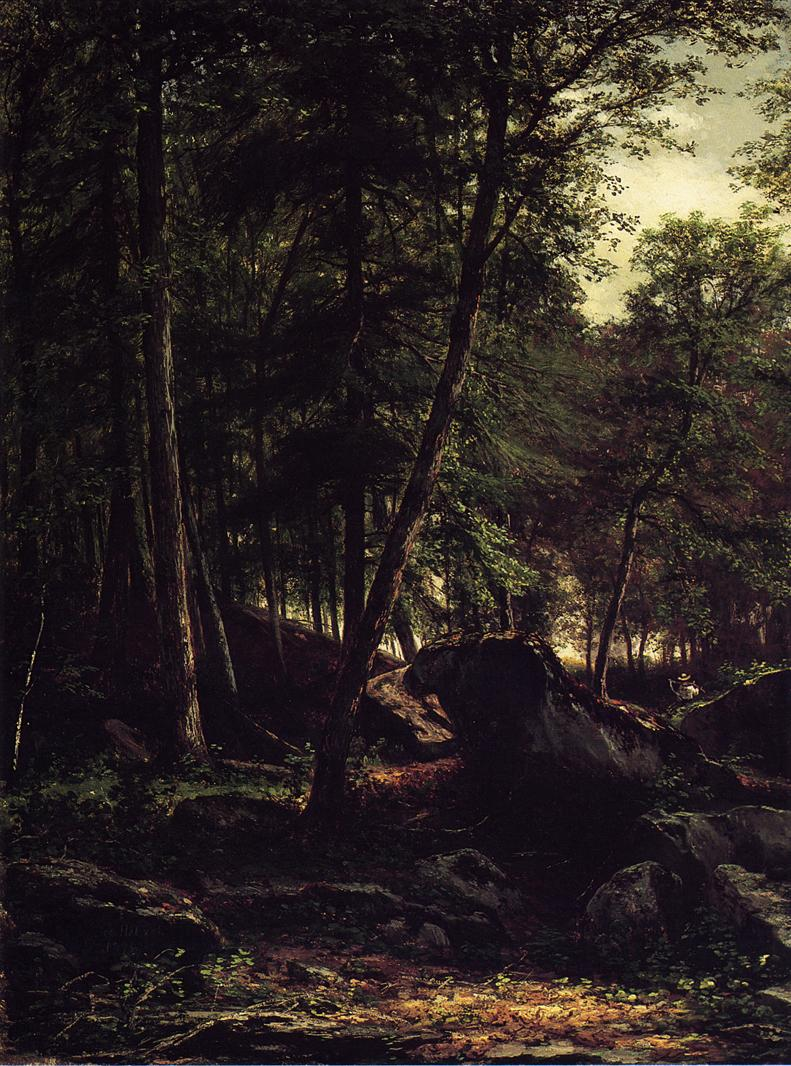
Appalachian Landscape with Figure Carrying a Syche (1875), private collection

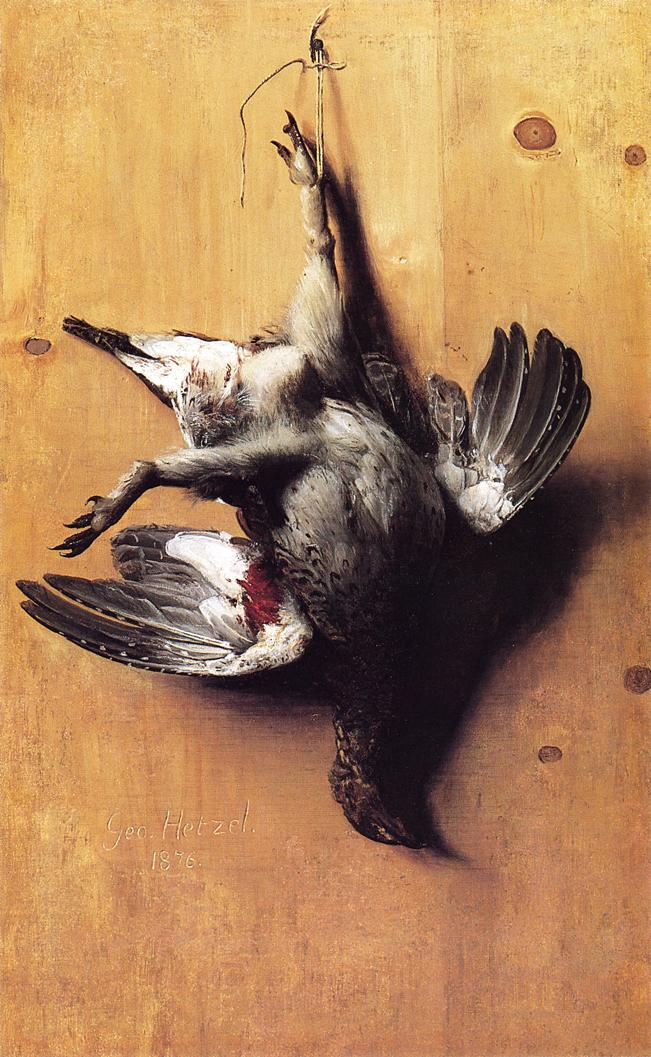
A Fowl Hanging on a Door (1876), private collection

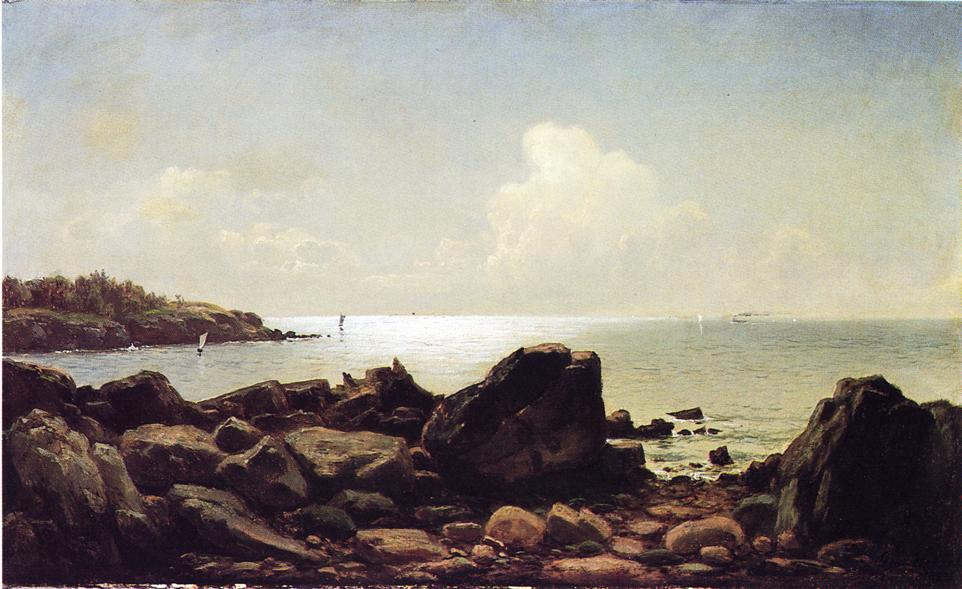
Rocky Inlet, Maine (1883), Westmoreland Museum of American Art

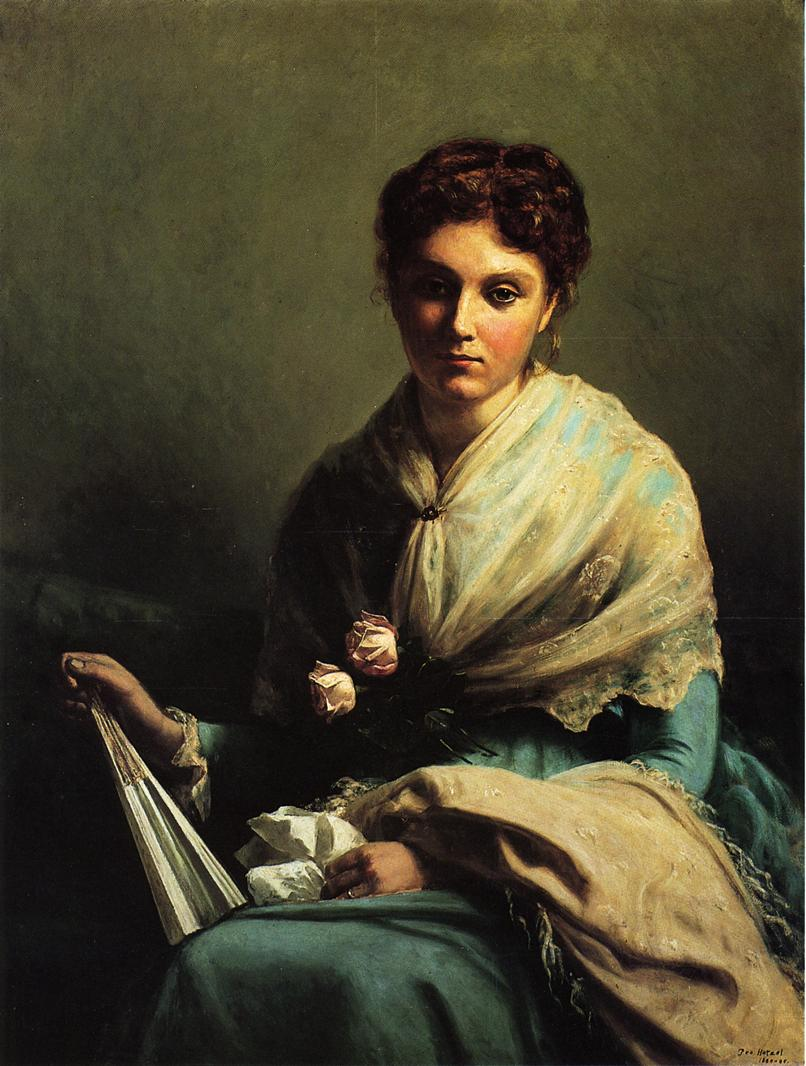
Portrait of Miss Helen Leslie Myers (Mrs. William Allen) (1884-85), Westmoreland Museum of American Art
