= Joseph R. Woodwell =

American artist

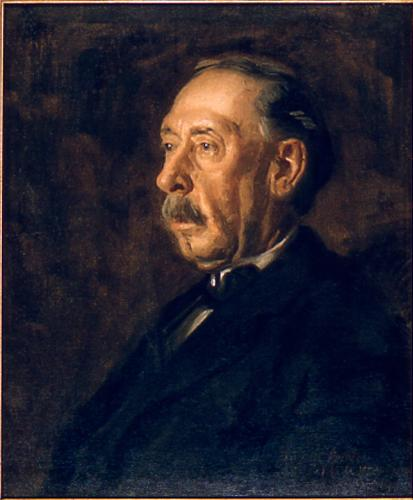
- Portrait of Joseph R. Woodwell by Thomas Eakins, 1904
- Born: September 7, 1842; Pittsburgh, Pennsylvania
- Died: May 30, 1911 (aged 69); Pittsburgh, Pennsylvania
- Known for: Painting

Joseph R. Woodwell (1842 – 1911) was an American businessman who was always more interested in painting and became known as an artist. He gained wealth from his father's hardware business and position by serving as director of three banks. He also continued a study and practice of painting that started when he went abroad to Paris at the age of seventeen.

== Biography ==
Joseph Ryan Woodwell was born on September 7, 1842, in Pittsburgh, Pennsylvania to Joseph and Joanna Woodwell. His father had been a cabinetmaker in New York. He also carved figures on ships' prows. Soon after the boy's birth, his father started a hardware business, known as Joseph Woodwell & Company, from which he made his wealth.

As a young man, Woodwell traveled to France where he studied with Charles Gleyre. He was associated with the Scalp Level Group painters in Pennsylvania.

Woodwell married Margaret E. Their daughter Johanna later became known as a painter in her own right.

Woodwell exhibited his work at the Carnegie International, the National Academy of Design, and the Pennsylvania Academy of the Fine Arts. He also exhibited at the 1876 Philadelphia Centennial Exposition and the 1893 Chicago World's Fair.

In the 1880s both Woodwell and his brother William K. Woodwell became members of the exclusive South Fork Fishing and Hunting Club, composed mostly of the wealthy elite from Pittsburgh. It developed a property for summer recreation in the mountains outside Pittsburgh.

He died on May 30, 1911, in Pittsburgh.

Woodwell's work is included in the collection of the Carnegie Museum of Art. His letters are in the Archives of American Art at the Smithsonian Institution.
