= James Redmond (artist) =

California painter (1901–1944)

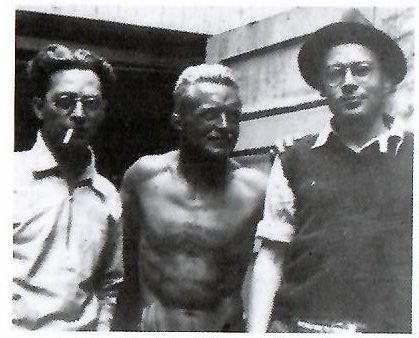
- James Redmond (on the left), Henry Clausen, and Don Totten, outside the Art Students League of Los Angeles, date unknown (Hideo Date collection, Japanese American National Museum)
- Born: James McKay Redmond; September 14, 1901; Grand Rapids, Kent County, Michigan, United States
- Died: December 21, 1944 (aged 43); Near Martelange, Luxembourg Province, Belgium
- Burial place: Ardennes American Cemetery and Memorial, Belgium
- Other name: Jim Redmond
- Occupations: Painter; muralist; printmaker; art teacher
- Years active: 1926–1942

James McKay Redmond (September 14, 1901 – December 21, 1944) was an American painter, muralist, and printmaker active in Los Angeles in the 1920s and 1930s. His prismatic colors and sinuous lines were admired by the critics of his day and his New Deal-era murals are considered particularly fine exemplars of the genre. A leader in the local art community, he succeeded his mentor Stanton Macdonald-Wright as a director of the progressive and influential Art Students League of Los Angeles and steered the organization through the Great Depression. During World War II, he enlisted in the U.S. Army, and landed at Omaha Beach in Normandy, France on D-Day with his battalion of combat engineers. Redmond was killed in action four days before Christmas 1944 during the German counteroffensive into the Ardennes Forest known as the Battle of the Bulge.

== Biography ==
Redmond was born in 1901 in Grand Rapids, a city in western Michigan. He was the firstborn of four children of William Redmond, a printer, and his wife Carrie McKay. Redmond moved to Southern California in 1912. He completed two years of high school education. By 1920 Redmond lived in Redondo Beach in the South Bay region of greater Los Angeles.

=== Art career ===
Redmond started studying with Staunton Macdonald-Wright at the Art Students League of Los Angeles by 1926. He was considered "one of the most talented of Macdonald-Wright's disciples". Herman Cherry later recalled the era in an article for Arts magazine:

The school Stanton MacDonald Wright organized in the 1920s, the Art Students League of Los Angeles, located in downtown Los Angeles, was the closest thing in L. A. history to [a central] meeting ground. Wright returned from Europe in the 1920s, bringing with him some of the fire of battle from the avant-garde wars of Paris, and although later he was to reject it and retire into a cloister of orientalism, for a time he was an important force for artists in the area. Classes at his school met on Tuesday and Thursday evenings; he taught a form of synchromy, as well as sketching from the model, and he gave analyses and lectures on the art of the past. Out of these came the Saturday night get-togethers with one member or another cooking the meal. Somewhat like the New York "artists' club," it attracted people from the allied arts, writers, singers, actors, composers and others who had something interesting to contribute. Collectors like Frank Stevens or Jack Wells, who were buying Wright's and Morgan Russell's paintings at that time, were also beginning to buy the works of such younger painters as James Redmond, Al King, and Fred Sexton.

By 1928 or 1929, Redmond was doing scenery painting for the Santa Monica Theater Guild alongside Macdonald-Wright and Art Students League members Carl Winter and Albert King. Redmond and King were the co-founders of what was called the Younger Artists Group that exhibited together between 1928 and 1932, at Barnsdall Park Art Center, the Los Angeles Museum, Santa Monica Public Library, and the Hollywood Library. The Younger Artists described themselves as "young in a sense of growth" but exhibited "advanced and mature" artworks.

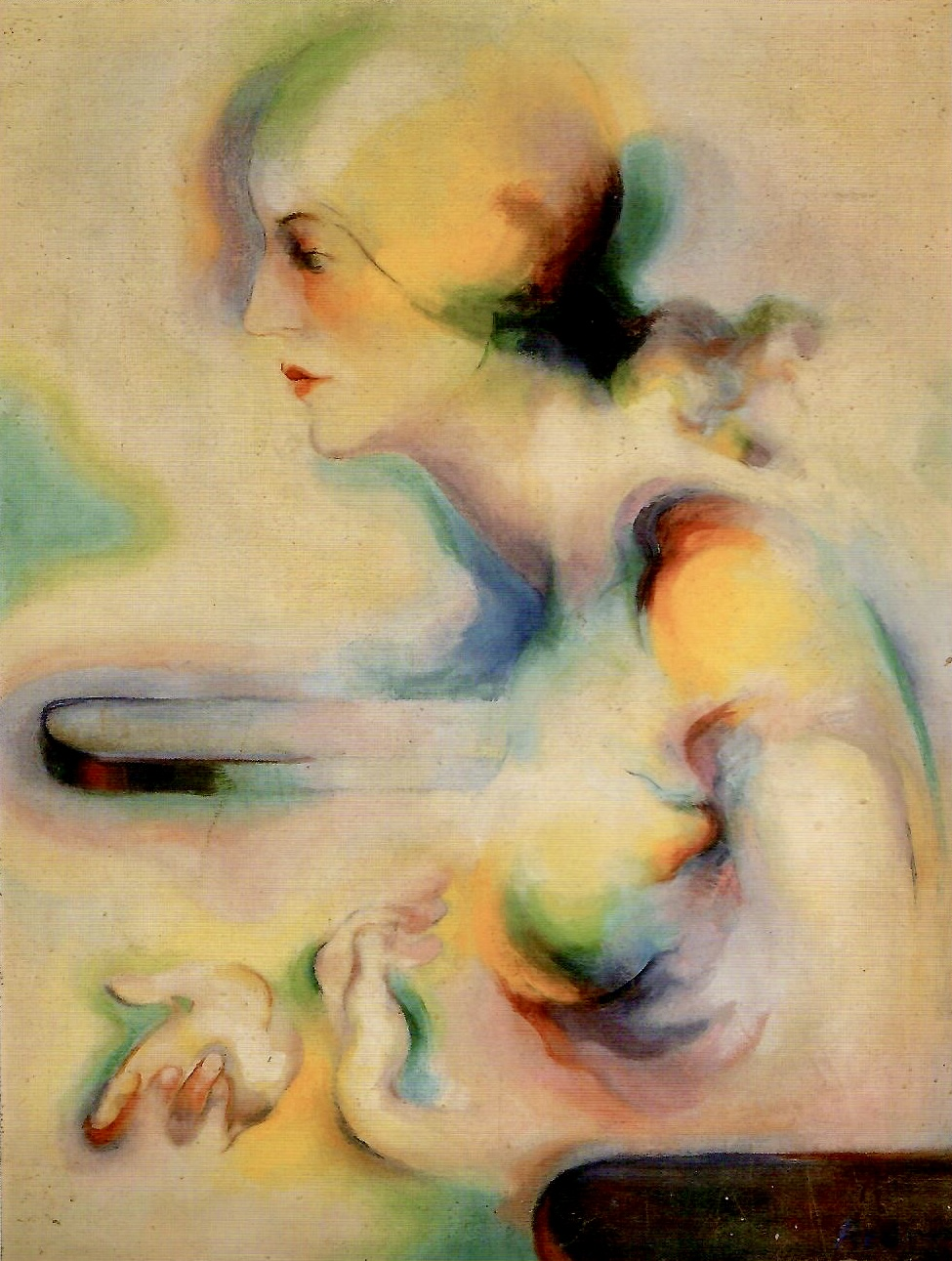
Portrait of Gwain Noot Sexton (n.d.) by James M. Redmond; this oil on canvas portrait of another member of the Art Students League is in the synchromist style

After Macdonald-Wright resigned as president of the Art Students' League of Los Angeles, Redmond took over, maintaining the group's studio on Spring Street above the Lyceum Theater between Second and Third, and adeptly administering the organization. Beginning in June 1932, Redmond scheduled classes and models, and collected fees, and even lived in the studio for a time, no doubt to keep his personal expenses down during the financial doldrums of the Great Depression. Around this time the art critic for the Los Angeles Times wrote, "Starting with the style of his teacher, S. Macdonald-Wright, Redmond has developed something of his own...Redmond begins to seem more essentially a painter than does his master...Redmond grows in esteem as his works are repeatedly studied".

Under Macdonald-Wright's influence, Redmond began studying Asian art styles, history, and philosophy. Redmond "maintained close friendships with Asian American artists" and became fluent in both Japanese and Chinese. One of the ways he attempted to increase enrollment was by advertising in the local Japanese-language newspaper Kashū Mainichi. Circa 1935 he began working on prints with lithographer Lynton Kistler.

In addition to exhibiting widely in California, Redmond had pieces shown at the Carl Fischer Art Gallery in New York, when he was featured in the Ten Pacific Coast Painters exhibit along with Macdonald-Wright, Nick Brigante, Conrad Buff, Thomas Craig, Charles H. David, Barse Miller, Phyllis Shields, and Vivian Stringfield.

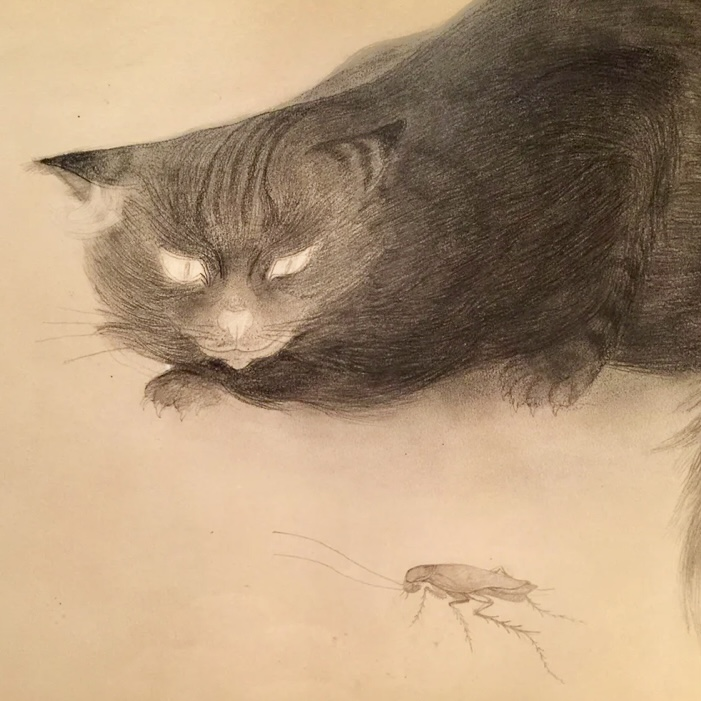
Mad Van Antiques of St. Paul, Minnesota recently offered this undated James Redmond cat and cockroach drawing for sale

Redmond painted a wide array of subjects, including landscapes, portraits and figures, still lifes, and botanicals, but he particularly drew compliment from Los Angeles Times art critic Arthur Millier (and others) for his pictures of cats. Millier later called Siamese Cat the "finest canvas" at Redmond's memorial show, with "sheerly beautiful composition" and "strong color harmony". He also noted a watercolor called Turtle and Narcissus, and a picture of a nude figure lying in a "rich-colored landscape".

==== New Deal projects ====
Redmond was hired for several New Deal art projects in California, including the early Public Works of Art Project and the Treasury Department's Section of Painting and Sculpture. Redmond's work (likely an easel painting or lithograph) was included in the Public Works of Art Project exhibitions at the Los Angeles Museum, the Corcoran Gallery in Washington, D.C., and at the Whitney in New York.

In 1938 Redmond was hired by the Federal Art Project's Community Art Center program to teach art and serve as director of the Butte Art Center in Montana. He worked there for a "few months" before returning to California.

Redmond also produced artworks for Phineas Banning Junior High School, in Wilmington, California, San Pedro High School, and a 600 ft^{2} (56 m^{2}) triptych mural on the history of science for Manual Arts High School that was exhibited, prior to installation, at the Los Angeles county museum in Exposition Park in 1939. According to Artists in California, 1786–1940 by Edan Milton Hughes, other Redmond commissions during New Deal were done for the Compton post office in Los Angeles County, the Santa Paula post office in Ventura County, and the San Diego Art Museum.

==== Early California ====
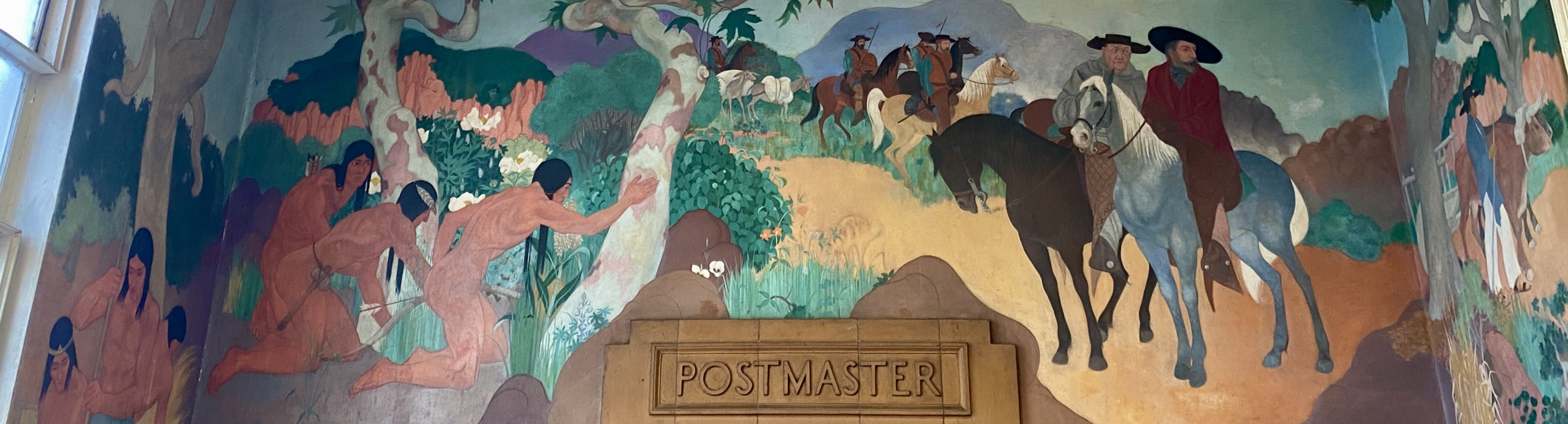
One of the four panels of Redmond's Early California mural at the Compton post office; Redmond made a point to include California native plant species (such as Western sycamore, manzanita, Matilija poppies, and Calchortus) throughout the design

Redmond is probably best known today for the mural Early California that he painted for the U.S. post office building in downtown Compton, California, opposite the Compton station of the A Line (Los Angeles Metro) light rail, which at the time of painting in 1936 would have been a station of Pacific Electric's Long Beach Line streetcars. Chaffey College art history professor Orville Clarke wrote in 1998 that "One of the most beautiful sets of mural panels executed under government sponsorship during the depression is James Redmond's panels for the Compton Post Office. Unfortunately, because of their location, they are also one of the least visited sites, which is a pity since they are so captivating in person". The curators of a 2008 exhibit on the Art Students League wrote that Early California "clearly shows the resonance of the League...employs an Asian-influenced landscape by way of his study at the League, and uses flat, brilliant color patterns that evince his careful study of modernism".

Redmond was assisted in his painting which primarily occurred at the League building, by Donald Totten and Valentine Costello. The piece covers all four walls of the lobby, including a 55-foot (17-meter)-long main panel opposite the front door. The subject matter is the "history of early California, particularly the Los Angeles area" including portraits of Spanish colonial explorers and missionaries, Fermín de Lasuén, Gaspar de Portolá, Junípero Serra, and Juan Bautista de Anza. Redmond was conscious of Compton's history, including its history as part of Rancho San Pedro, did extensive research for the mural, writing program administrators that "I am using every source of reference procurable in early pictures, museums and histories of the period to furnish data for authentic details of racial types, clothing and equipment, such as saddles, bridles, etc." California travel writer Brad Nixon comments that Redmond's conscientious approach is evident in the final product: "Those people have 'weight.' They look like they're standing, kneeling on the ground or sitting in the saddle; they're not floating. And they're working, pointing, posed convincingly. I don't doubt that Mr. Redmond researched the clothing, tools and horse-drawn vehicles".

Early California is also recognized for Redmond's skillful design and use of color: a "high key palette that turns the room into a kaleidoscope of colors" as "the eye is carried around by a complex pattern of diagonals. He holds the entire painting together by his use of greens of various hues. Redmond takes a complex arrangement and makes it look deceptively simple. It is through this masterful handling of color and form that Redmond is able to unify the entire room and capture our attention." Federal art program administrator Bernard Roufberg was also complimentary of Redmond's work: "Unlike many mural painters, Redmond makes a rough sketch of his design and color, and then works on his mural making changes as he progresses, rather than making a finely finished design and then 'blowing it up' to size as he puts it. His mural is one of the handsomest things I have ever seen and to me it looked like a jewel".

=== World War II ===
By the 1940s, Redmond was considered a notable Los Angeles "artist of the modern school". When the United States entered World War II, Redmond enlisted in the U.S. Army in November 1942, even though "he was nearing the age limit of 41". Having refused an assignment as an interpreter, Redmond was attached to the 299th Combat Engineer Battalion. He was serving as a corporal at the Desert Training Center when his son was born in Newhall in spring 1943.

Redmond was part of a unit that landed on Omaha Beach on D-Day. An interview with Staff Sergeant Redmond is one of the primary sources for the description of the assault on Fox Green sector in the U.S. Army's history of the combat engineers in the European Theater:

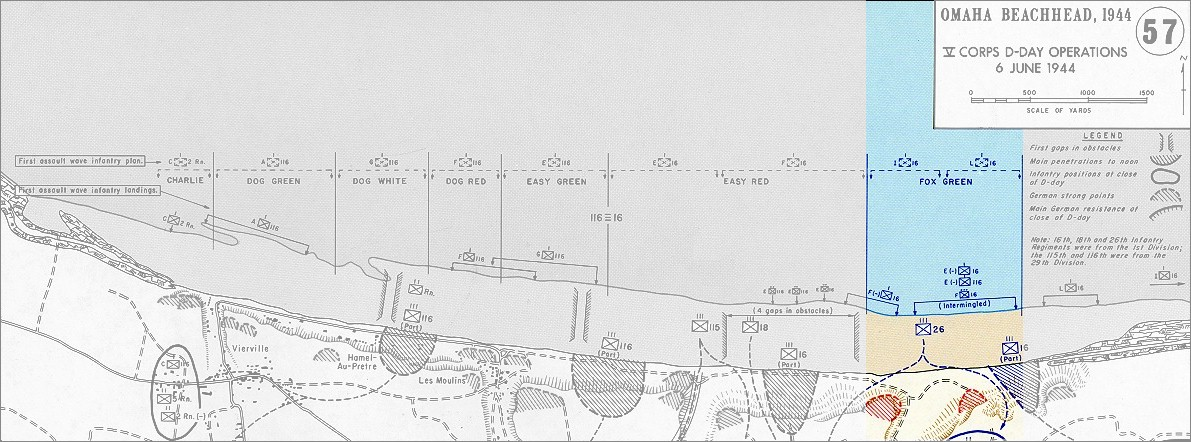
Map of Fox Green sector

Team 15 touched down at 0640, just as the tide began rising rapidly, and lost several men to machine gun fire before they left the LCM. In a now common occurrence, they sustained more casualties when a shell found the rubber boat with its volatile load. The survivors nevertheless attacked the Belgian gates farthest from shore and fixed charges to several. The fusillade from shore cut away fuses as rapidly as the engineers could rig them. One burst of fragments carried away a fuseman's carefully set mechanism—and all of his fingers. With no choice but to make for shore, they ran, only four of their original 40 uninjured, to the low shingle bank on Fox Green, where they collapsed, "soaking wet, unable to move, and suffering from cramps. It was cold and there was no sun." [Interv, S/Sgt James M. Redmond, Team 15, Notes and Data, Neptune.]

After successfully overwhelming the German defenders at Normandy, Redmond and the rest of the 299th continued moving through Fortress Europe for the next six months, clearing junk, salvaging vehicles, and building bridges over assorted rivers on the road to Hitler's headquarters in Germany. Redmond fought with his unit for six months after D-Day before he was killed in the vicinity of Witry, outside Martelange, Belgium, in the early morning hours of December 21, 1944. Amidst the German counteroffensive along the Belgium–Luxembourg border near the Sauer River, Redmond's group had been tasked with recapturing the town of Martelange. According to the regimental history of the 299th in World War II, "Captain Manion planned to attack Martelange at dawn, and a patrol had been sent out to contact Lieutenant Jenkins' force. Food, medical supplies, and a radio set with operators from the 127th Engineer Combat Battalion were sent forward with an officer from that organization. Contact was made only twice with these men. All personnel sent forward at that time were later reported missing in action. It was later confirmed that these men never reached the Witry [command post]." When the 299th was finally relieved and reunited on December 26, a count found that 41 of their number had gone missing during the action in southeastern Belgium. Redmond was reported missing in his local newspaper, the Saugus Signal of Santa Clarita Valley, on January 15, 1945.

Redmond's body was not identified until March 1945, at which time his widow was notified that he had been killed in action. Confirmation of his death was made public in June 1945. In July 1945, Albert King, who had been a part of the Art Students' League of Los Angeles, organized a memorial art show featuring 27 of Redmond's artworks. In 1946, Redmond's name was included on the World War II honor roll of the American Legion post in Saugus, California.

Redmond is buried at Ardennes American Cemetery near Neupré, Belgium, in plot D, row 6. His decorations include a Bronze Star and the French Croix de Guerre.

== Additional images ==
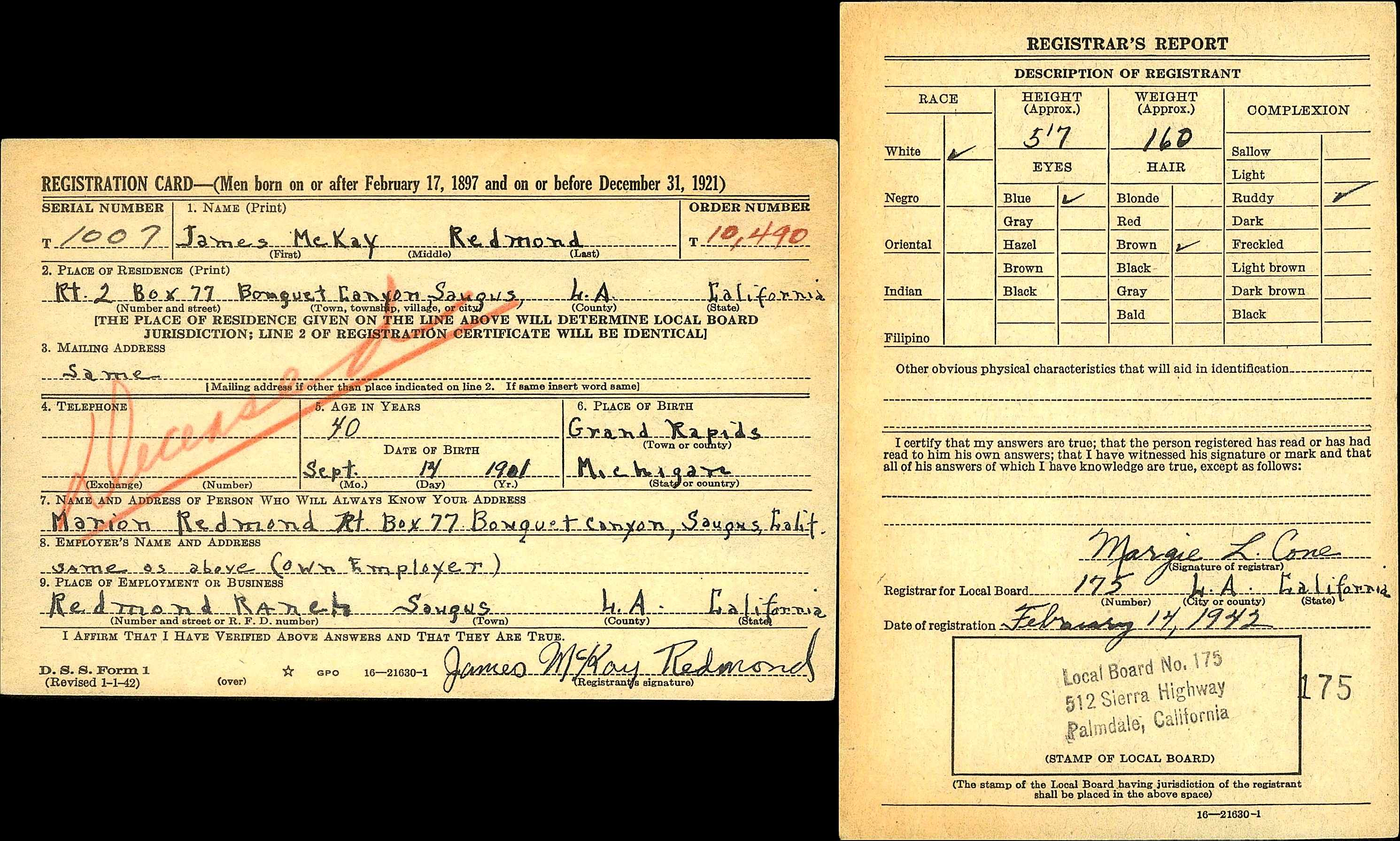
Redmond draft card, 1942

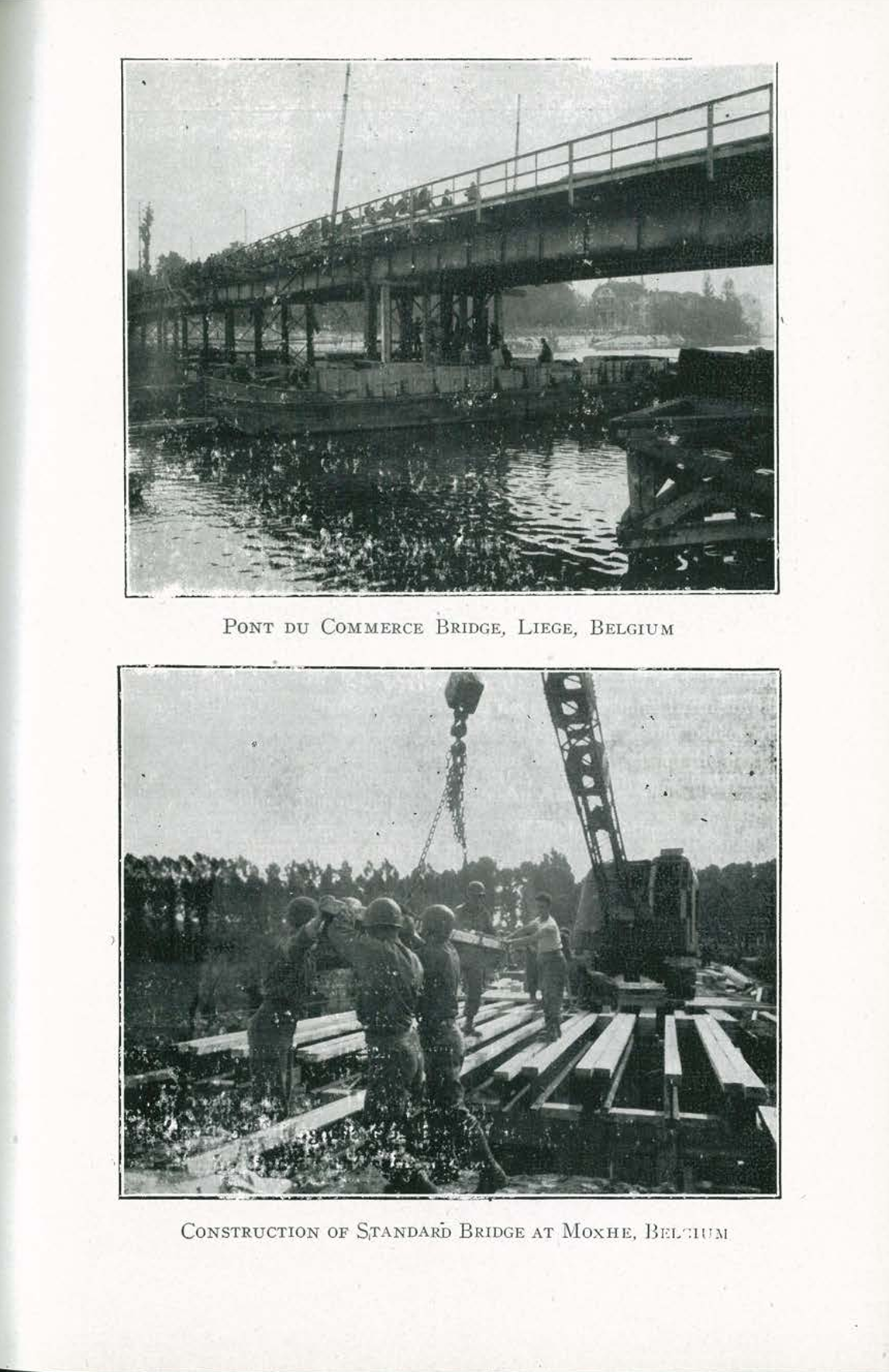
Photos of bridges constructed in Europe by the 299th Combat Engineers

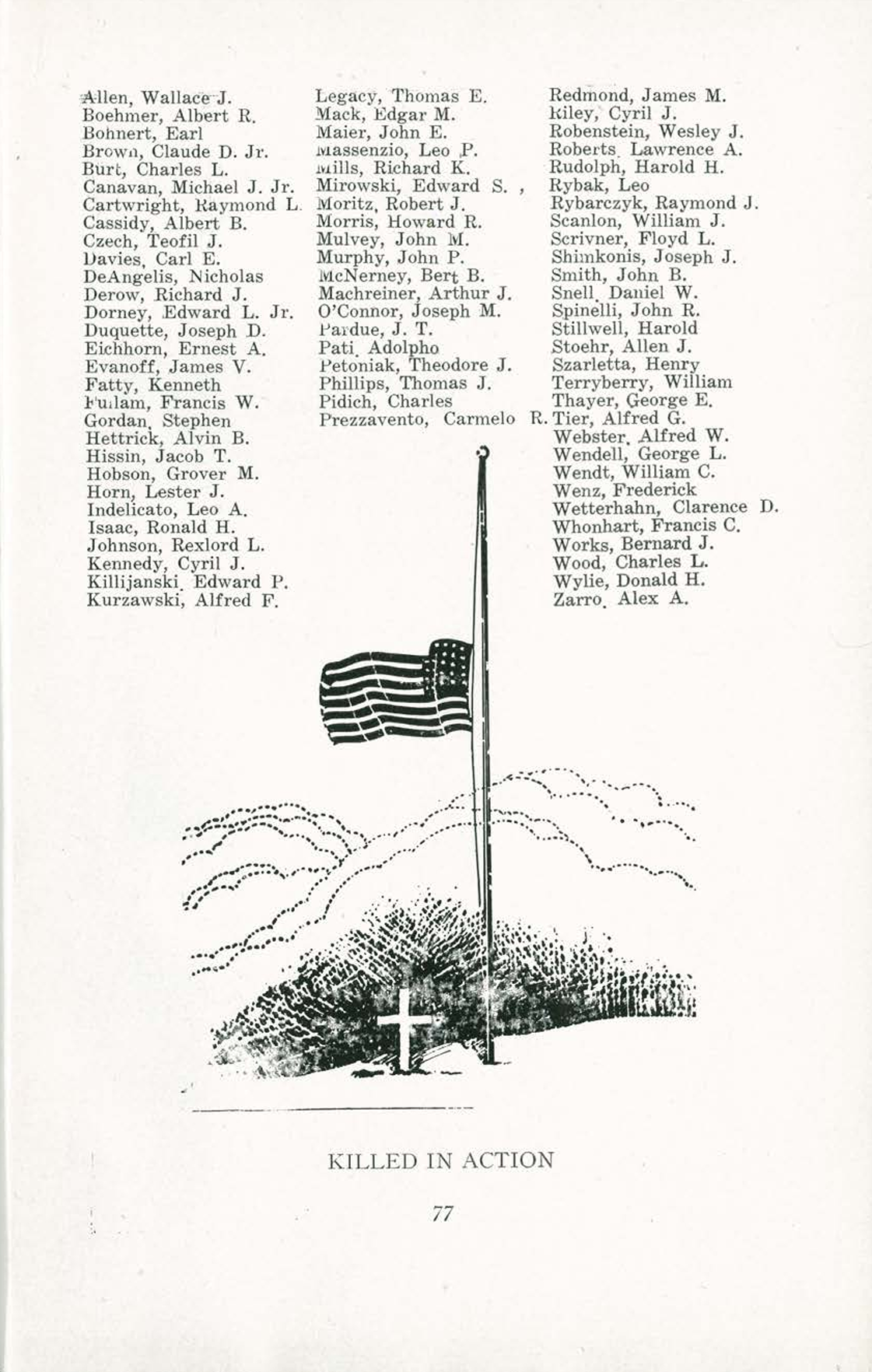
KIA memorial page from The Famous 299th (1950)

== See also ==
- List of United States post office murals § California
