= Rex Slinkard =

American artist (1887–1918)

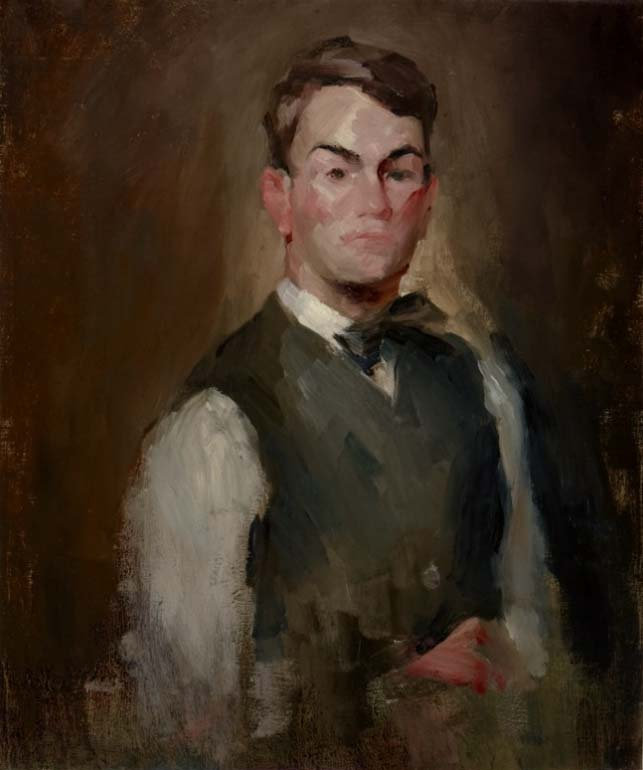
Self-Portrait (c.1910)

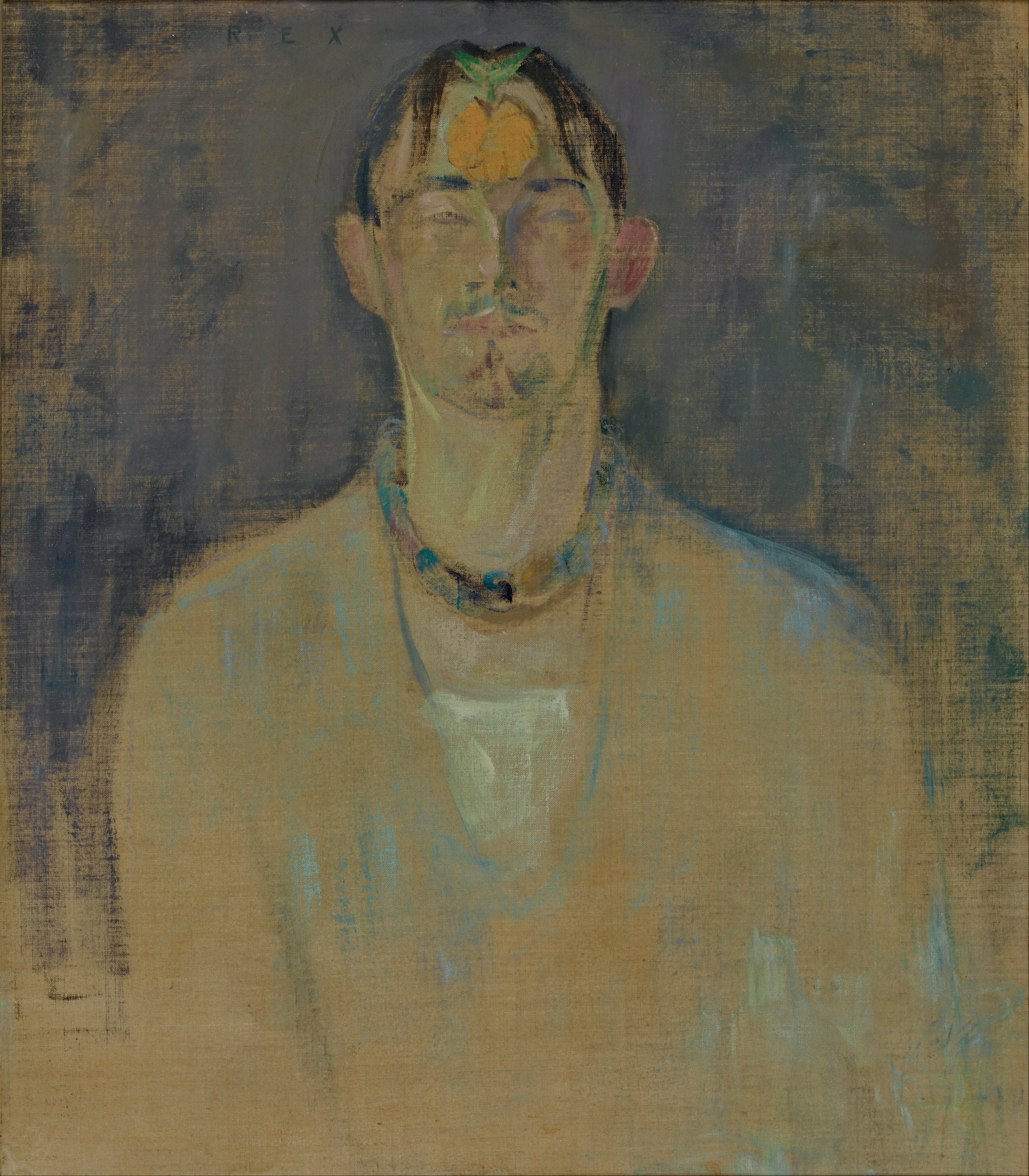
Rex (c.1915)

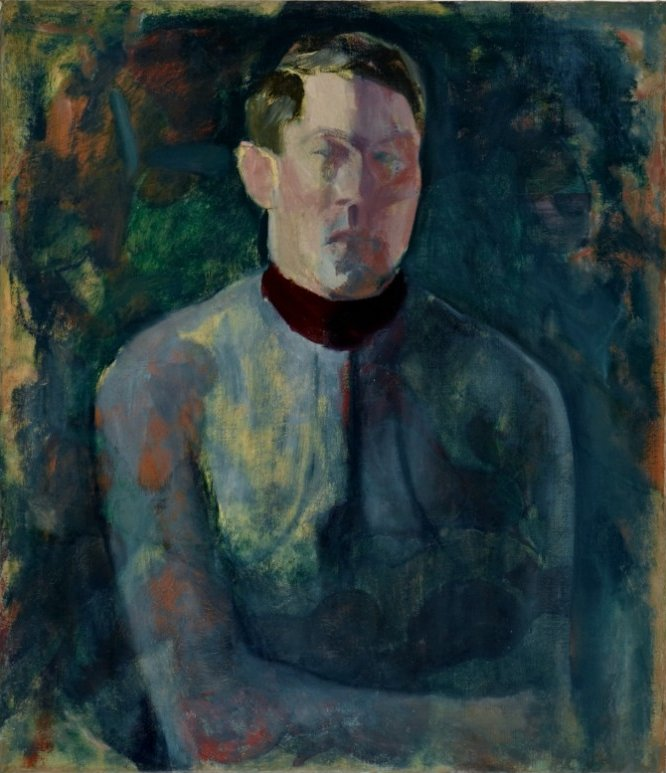
Self-Portrait (undated)

Rex Rudy Slinkard (June 5, 1887, Edwardsport, Indiana – October 18, 1918, Manhattan, New York City) was an American modernist painter and teacher. He is best remembered for his Symbolist works, most of which were unknown until after his premature death at age 31.

== Biography ==
He was the younger son of rancher, Stephen Wall Slinkard and Laura Simonson. He had an elder brother named Donald. Sometime after 1900, the family moved from Knox County, Indiana to the Saugus section of Los Angeles County, California. (Note: The 1900 U.S. Census records the Slinkards living in Indiana.) They lived on a horse-and-cattle ranch in the Tehachapi Hills, north of the city.

Slinkard studied for two years at the University of Southern California under landscape painter William Lees Judson.

=== ASL of LA ===
The Art Students League of Los Angeles was organized in April 1906, and loosely modeled after the Art Students League of New York. Slinkard entered the school in 1907, and studied under Walter Hedges, a student of Robert Henri. The League awarded Slinkard a 1908 scholarship to study under Henri at the William Merritt Chase School in New York City.

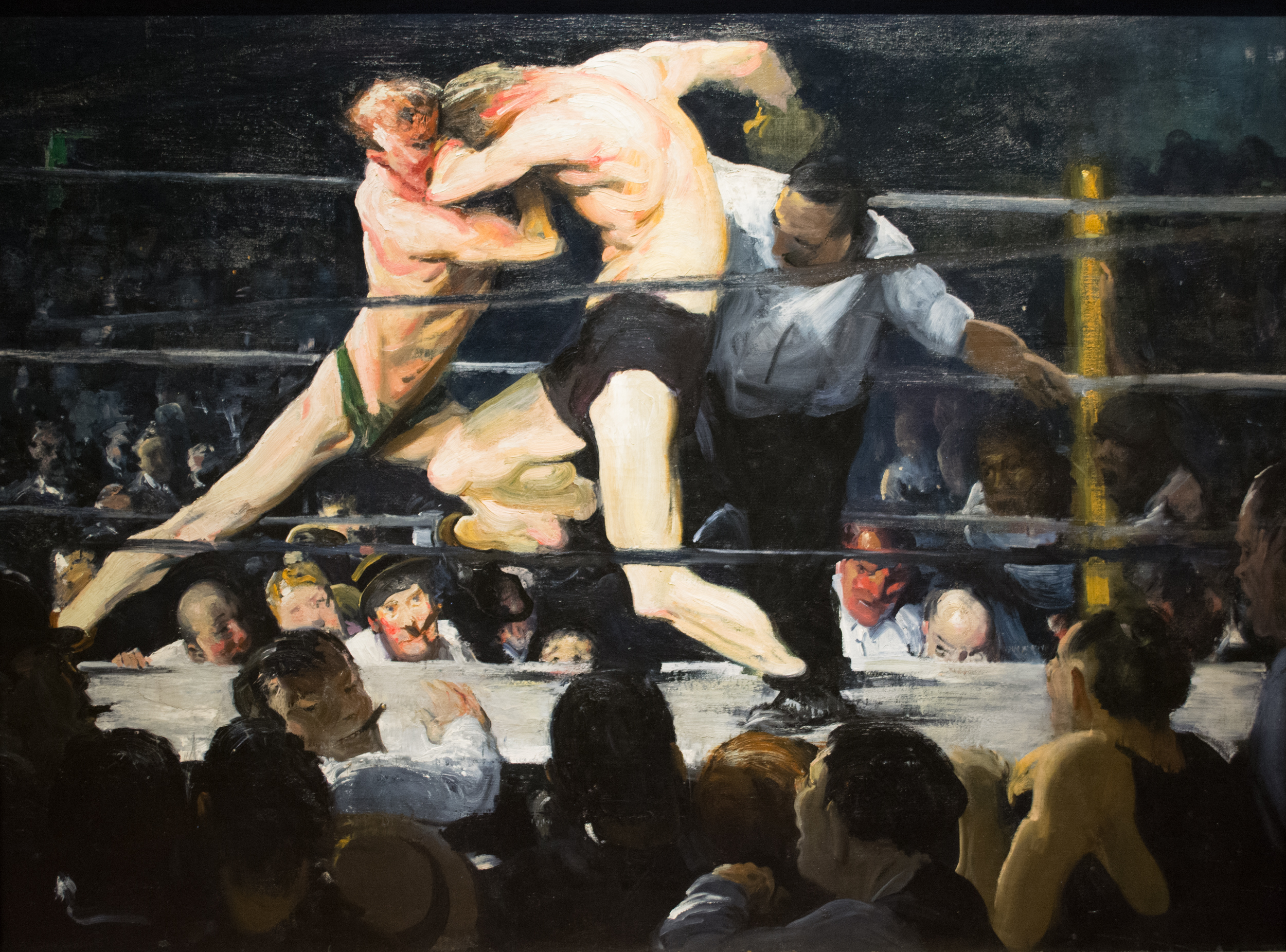
Stag at Sharkey's (1909) by George Wesley Bellows. At lower left, the man smoking a cigar and looking back at the viewer is Slinkard.

Slinkard and George Wesley Bellows were classmates at the Chase School, and shared a flat and studio. Both followed Henri when he opened his own school the following year. A cameo portrait of Slinkard appears in the foreground of Bellows's early fight painting, Stag at Sharkey's (1909).

Hedges died in January 1910, and when Slinkard returned to California the following summer, he was offered the position of chief instructor at the League. The school organized an exhibition of works by Slinkard and League alumnus Pruett Carter in August 1910, which received a highly favorable review in The Los Angeles Times. In early 1911, at age 23, Slinkard was named director of the League. His friend Carl "Sprink" Sprinchorn, a fellow student of Henri, joined him as an instructor at the school.

"For the present, instructors of the ASL of LA are pupils of Robert Henri of NY—and you know what that means! You know, at once, that they are strictly up-to-date in their artistic ideas, that they are the most modern of the moderns, and that they are smashing academic traditions with every vigorous stroke of charcoal stick or paintbrush." — Antony Anderson, The Los Angeles Times

In addition to being a prodigious artistic talent, Slinkard was a charismatic teacher. (Note: "Rex Slinkard was my mentor, not so much a teacher as a mentor. He guided me into the main principles of art, Chinese Sung painting and the Renaissance. He was a friend of Bellows, and both he and Bellows were students of Robert Henri. Slinkard came back and settled in Southern California and took over the Art Students League. He was probably one of the most brilliant teachers at that time. He died in 1918, during World War One. He was only 31 when he died." — Lawrence Murphy interview with Nick Brigante, 11 September 1975, reprinted in Kirk McDonald, Lawrence Murphy: An Undiscovered Master Painter (2007).) But his adherence to teaching the Realist style of the Ashcan School alienated experienced students such as Conrad Buff and Frank Curran, who had already established their own personal styles. The League provided a morning life class for women and men and an evening life class for men, with afternoons open for individual studio work. Slinkard socialized with students outside the school, and attended their Saturday night pot-luck dinners at the League.

Slinkard became romantically involved with artist's model Jessie Daisy Augsbury, and married her after she became pregnant. The wedding took place on February 15, 1912, and their son Robert was born on March 19. Slinkard deserted his wife after less than a year, forcing her to divorce him. (Note: "The wife of Rex Slinkard, a young artist, who before their marriage was his model and companion in Bohemia, brought suit through Attorney G. H. Harker, for $15,000 damages yesterday against her father- and mother-in-law, charging alientation of his affections. ... The young artist closed his studio in Blanchard Hall, the 'Latin Quarter' of Los Angeles, and went away six weeks ago. It is rumored among the artists here that he has opened a studio in New York City, but his parents, Mr. and Mrs. William [sic] Slinkard of No. 1437 Wright street, will neither confirm nor deny the report. ... Mrs. Slinkard was not received by his parents and did not see her mother-in-law until three weeks ago, when she went to the home to demand her husband's address. 'When my son's wife complained to me that he had left her without support I informed her that he was not capable of taking care of himself,' the artist's father said last night. 'I buy his clothes and furnish him with money. He's a dreamer and not a money maker. I advised her to get a divorce and I furnished her with money for a while on the condition she do so. The damage suit is a scheme to force a money settlement out of me, but I will fight it out.' ") The scandal led to his resignation as director of the League in January 1913. Sprinchorn succeeded him as director.

=== Saugus ===
Slinkard retreated into self-imposed exile at the family ranch in Saugus. After not painting for close to a year, (Note: "I haven't painted for months and now I'm working again. Oh! It's wonderful to work. To work with the inside of oneself. For months and months I've just thought.) he began a series of increasingly moody self-portraits (Note: "[Nick] Brigante thought that Slinkard's Young Priest, as well as Acolyte—another title with religious connotation—referred cryptically to Slinkard's guilt and remorse over Jessie Augsbury's pregnancy, their marriage and divorce, and the child he had abandoned.")— Acolyte–Self-Portrait (c.1914-1916), Rex (c.1915), Self-Portrait (undated). These broke away from the influence of Henri, and developed into the Symbolist style for which he would be remembered.

Hello! S.[Sprink], I wish you were here to see what I am painting. ... I'm trying for rich colour, and trying to keep the painter out of it. That is, the brushwork, that attracts so many. And to get to the facts in a simple way. ... Am not painting along the lines of our old school. That is, the brush of the old school. Dear Mr. _ _ _. I like him as well as I used to but his pictures are not for me. I mean they don't hold me long enough. I'll paint different. I wish he could come on the ranch. I wish he could lie back and look into the sky till he became sleepy—and lie there and sleep. I wish he could see the Polish boy. Kiss this little calf, and his moist hand touch its wet nose. And grab it and almost strangle it with love. Oh! S.—love is the strongest thing. It makes one beautiful, and all things beautiful. Botticelli I love—and another—Teppo Tiffi [sic, Tiepolo?]—that's not right, but maybe you will know who I mean. I'll send you a print of his. Puvis de Chavannes, I love, and Arthur Davies.

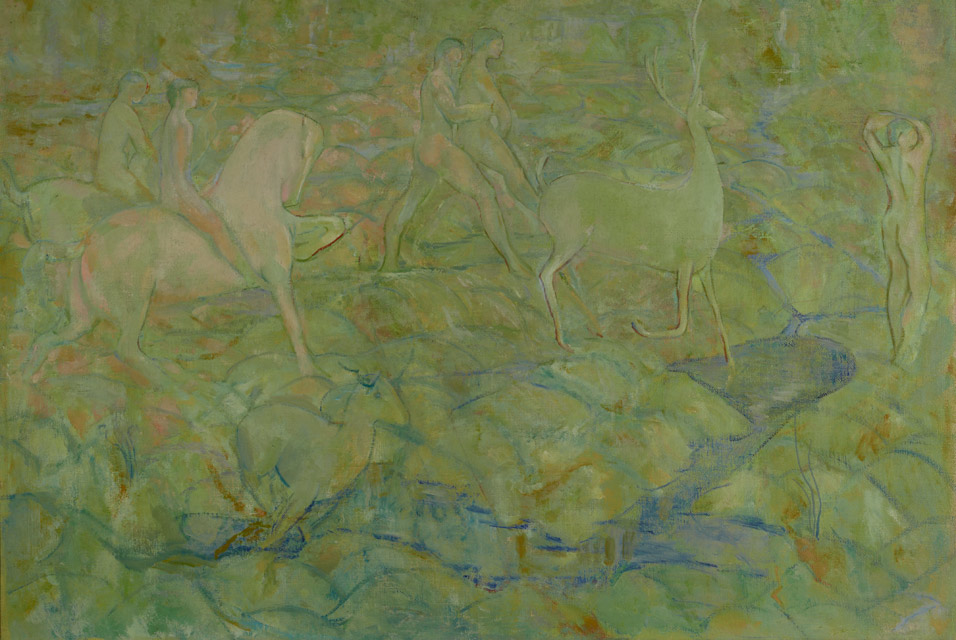
Young Rivers (1916)

In Young Rivers (1916), perhaps Slinkard's most famous painting, he transformed the irrigation ditches of Saugus into an idyllic landscape populated by ethereal youths and animals. Curiously, Young Rivers was painted in the basement of his parents' house on Wright Street in Los Angeles.

My Dear C[arl]: –It's in September. The day of the month I don't know. I'm working in a cement room 14X20 [ft] underneath the house—the ceiling of rafters. ...
On my easel I have a canvass 48X40 [in]. This canvass I've been working on for six or seven days. ... My intention in this canvass is far from my surroundings. For a long time I've realized that I am working on a flat surface. This painting is a decoration. Its background—top is of green bushes, waterfalls and pools, and rock. Then coming on down, more rocks, water between the water-smoothed rocks which are oval-shaped everywhere—with pools of cold clear water, some above some below one another. And all coming down and moving to the right. In the center of the canvass, moving up and down, and to the right are two white boys on two white boy-horses, then two boys moving across, and a little up. And then a white deer with long glistening horns, and he is listening, hesitating, and moving down, one foot in a pool of purple water, which is hesitating, but running. And then a little up, and down, a girlish boy—a back view, arms folded above and in back of head. Head is turned sideways and looking directly out of canvass, to the right. The legs and back are stretched up and forward. Then moving on down, there are rocks and water that are of the same quality as all above. Then comes a large pool of clear blue water and at the left a goat running and jumping into the pool. And the pool has the same movement as the figures and water above. And then at the extreme left is a 3-stemmed, stripped bush which takes the gesture of the girlish boy above, at the extreme right. And, you have the picture. [NOTE: The misspellings of "canvas" are Slinkard's.]

=== Military service and death ===
Slinkard was drafted into the U.S. Army in September 1917. As part of the 91st Infantry Division, he would have been deployed to Europe in Summer 1918, but he contracted scarlet fever in May. He recovered, (Note: "P. S. Here's a picture taken in Camp Lewis [Tacoma, Washington,] when I was at my best when in the army. I'm feeling pretty good. The scarlet fever is gone. But my nerves are not very good. But if they give me the job I want I can make good I know.") and was promoted to sergeant at Newark, New Jersey in July. While waiting to be shipped overseas, he contracted Spanish flu and was hospitalized on October 12. He died of pneumonia at St. Vincent's Hospital, Manhattan, on October 18, 1918.

Carl Sprinchorn accompanied his body on the train ride from New York City to Los Angeles, for funeral and burial. At the time of his death, Slinkard was engaged to Gladys Whitney Williams, who inherited most of his paintings and drawings.

== Posthumous recognition ==
The Los Angeles Museum mounted a memorial exhibition of Slinkard's work, June 3–30, 1919. Marsden Hartley, who never met the artist but had been shown his paintings and letters by Carl Sprinchorn, penned an effusive essay for the catalogue. Titled: "Rex Slinkard: Ranchman and Poet-Painter," Hartley asked: "How many are there who know, or could have known, the magic of this unassuming visionary person?"

There will be no argument to offer or to maintain regarding the work of Rex Slinkard. It is what it is, the perfect evidence that one of the finest lyric talents to be found among the young creators of America has been deprived of its chance to bloom as is would have done, as it so eagerly and surely was already doing. Rex Slinkard was a genius of first quality.

He was a young boy of light walking on a man's strong feet upon real earth over which there was no shadow for him. He walked straight-forwardly toward the elysium of his own personal fancies. His irrigation ditches were "young rivers" for him, rivers of being, across which white youths upon white horses, and white fawns were gliding to the measure of their own delights. He had, this young boy of light, the perfect measure of poetic accuracy coupled with a man's fine simplicity in him. He had the priceless calm for the understanding of his own poetic ecstasies. They acted upon him gently with their own bright pressure. He let them thrive according to their own relationships to himself. Nothing was forced in the mind and soul of Rex Slinkard.

The Los Angeles Museum's memorial exhibition traveled to the Exhibition Hall of the Palace of Fine Arts in San Francisco, October 3–27, 1919. Knoedler Gallery in New York City mounted a memorial exhibition, January 19–31, 1920, and reprinted Hartley's essay in its catalogue. Spurred by Hartley, poet William Carlos Williams published letters by Slinkard in the first three issues of the literary magazine Contact—December 1920, January 1921, and Spring 1921. The Los Angeles Museum mounted a second memorial exhibition in May 1929, (Note: "Only a few years of actual creative work produced the visions shown now at the Los Angeles Museum. But these are of a quality unlike anything else produced in our midst.") and reprinted Hartley's essay in its catalogue.

=== Other exhibitions ===
- Four paintings by Slinkard were part of an exhibition of Ashcan School painters at the MacDowell Club of New York, 108 W. 55th St., Manhattan, February 18 – March 2, 1919.
- Ten paintings by Slinkard were hung alongside works by Thomas Hart Benton, Stanton Macdonald-Wright, Morgan Russell and others, in the Group of Independent Artists of Los Angeles exhibition at the MacDowell Club of Los Angeles, Taos Building, January – February 1923.
- Portrait of Gladys Williams (c.1912) was part of a 1964 exhibition at the Long Beach Museum of Art: Arts of California—XVI: Early Moderns.
- My Song (c.1915-1916) was part of an exhibition at the San Francisco Museum of Modern Art: Painting and Sculpture in California: The Modern Era, September 3 – November 21, 1976.
- The Path (n.d.), Reclining Nude (n.d.) and Figures with Flowers (n.d.) were part of an exhibition at the Pasadena Museum of California Art: A Seed of Modernism: The Art Students League of Los Angeles, 1906-1953, January 20 – April 13, 2008.
- The Iris & B. Gerald Cantor Center for Visual Arts at Stanford University mounted a retrospective exhibition: The Legend of Rex Slinkard, November 9, 2011 – February 26, 2012.

=== Legacy ===
Slinkard, who had trained with Robert Henri, developed a lyrical, semiabstract form of symbolist painting in which he blended suggestions of music and dance into figural compositions. In Slinkard's paintings volume and outline alternately separated and blended to accentuate Wagnerian episodes of libinal yearning. The highly original visual qualities of these works were effectively captured in Hartley's erotically charged description of Slinkard's method, written to accompany the Los Angeles Museum's 1919 memorial exhibition.

Slinkard continued to influence his friends and students. Carl Sprinchorn made a 1920s drawing of his grave, done in the style of his late friend. Former-student Nick Brigante made a series of 1920s drawings in Slinkard's style, and inserted miniature versions of his teacher's paintings into some of his 1940s Surrealist works. Mabel Alvarez's Symbolist paintings of the late 1920s seem to have been influenced by Slinkard. (Note: In her diary, Alvarez described Slinkard's work as "all emotion—a dream world of the spirit—Nothing of the material world. Strange and lovely color and compositions and subjects. He worked entirely from within and said lovely things that were all his own.")

Sprichorn wrote an unpublished biography: Rex Slinkard: A Biographical-Critical Study of His Life, Paintings, and Drawings (c.1952). The manuscript is in the Carl Spinchorn Papers at the Raymond H. Fogler Library, University of Maine.(PDF)

Florence A. Williams, sister of Slinkard's fiancee Gladys, bequeathed a large collection of his works to Stanford University in 1955. This forms the core of the Cantor Arts Center's 268 works by Slinkard.
