= Murder of Diana Santos =

2022 murder in Luxembourg

- Location: 49°32′44.94″N 5°47′2.48″E (crime scene); Diekirch, Luxembourg (murder location)
- Date: September 18, 2022
- Target: Diana Santos
- Attack type: Femicide, murder, dismemberment
- Weapon: Knife
- Deaths: 1
- Victim: Diana Santos
- Perpetrator: 1
- Assailant: Said Banhakeia
- Motive: Romantic obsession and rejection
- Accused: 1
- Charges: Murder, mutilation of a corpse
- Verdict: Guilty of murder and desecration of a corpse
- Convictions: Life imprisonment without parole
- Convicted: Said Banhakeia

On 18 September 2022, Diana Santos, a 40-year-old Portuguese national, was killed in her residence in Diekirch, Luxembourg. and subsequently dismembered. Her remains were dispersed across border regions in France and Germany, resulting in a joint investigation by law enforcement authorities in Luxembourg, France, and Germany. In February 2026, 51-year-old Moroccan national Said Banhakeia was convicted of her murder and sentenced to life imprisonment without parole by the Diekirch District Court.

== Background and murder ==
Diana Santos was a 40-year-old Portuguese citizen originally from Porto who resided in Diekirch, Luxembourg. On 18 September 2022, Santos was killed inside her home. Forensic evidence indicated that she died from a fatal knife wound to the neck that severed her carotid artery. Following the killing, her body was dismembered in the cellar of the building.

== Discovery of remains ==
On 19 September 2022, passersby discovered a decapitated torso behind an abandoned supermarket in Mont-Saint-Martin, France, near the Belgian and Luxembourgish borders. The victim was tentatively identified through distinctive tattoos and later confirmed via DNA testing.

On 1 November 2022, additional body parts—including the victim's head and legs—were recovered from a parking area in Temmels, Germany. DNA analysis conducted by forensic specialists at the University of Mainz confirmed that all recovered remains belonged to Santos. Her arms were never recovered.

== Investigation and legal proceedings ==
Because body parts were scattered across multiple national borders, police agencies in Luxembourg, France, and Germany launched a joint investigation. In October 2022, Luxembourgish judicial police arrested Said Banhakeia, a 51-year-old Moroccan national and former romantic partner of the victim.

During interrogation and trial, Banhakeia admitted to dismembering and disposing of Santos's body, but denied committing the murder. He claimed his nephew had killed Santos during an argument over a sham marriage before fleeing to Morocco. Investigators rejected his account after determining that the nephew had contacted Luxembourgish police from Morocco to report his uncle. Prosecutors established that Banhakeia murdered Santos out of romantic obsession after she sought to end their relationship. The case prompted public discussion regarding femicide and domestic violence protection in Luxembourg.

The trial took place at the Diekirch District Court. On 5 February 2026, the court found Banhakeia guilty of murder and desecration of a corpse. He was sentenced to life imprisonment without parole, ordered to pay €101,000 in court expenses, and ordered to pay €75,000 in civil damages to Santos's son.
