= Art Students League of Los Angeles =

Former painting school in Los Angeles, California

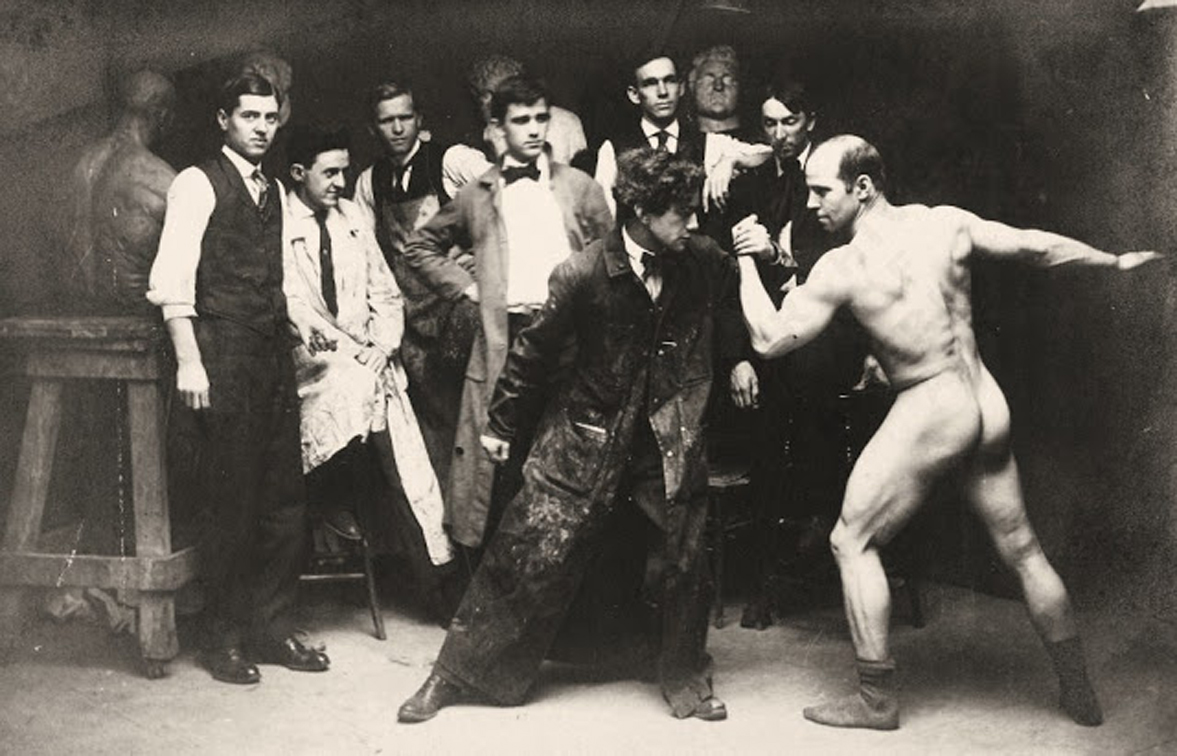
Rex Slinkard arm-wrestling with model Al Treloar at the Art Students League of Los Angeles, c.1912

Art Students League of Los Angeles was a modernist painting school that operated in Los Angeles, California from 1906 to 1953.

Among its students were painters Nicholas P. Brigante, Mabel Alvarez, Herman Cherry, Stanton Macdonald-Wright and Rex Slinkard; illustrators Conrad Buff, Pruett Carter and Paul Sample; architects Harwell Hamilton Harris and Chalfant Head; and artists who worked on Hollywood films, such as Carl Anderson, John Huston and Dorothy Jeakins. The League had a pattern of hiring its own—many of its instructors and most of its directors were alumni. It suspended classes during World War II, and had a short-lived revival after the war.

== History ==
The League grew out of the life classes taught by landscape painter Hanson Puthuff in his L.A. studio. Puthuff and Los Angeles Times art critic Antony Anderson co-founded the League on April 18, 1906. The school offered three-day-a-week morning classes for women (taught by Anderson) and three-day-a-week evening classes for men (taught by Puthuff). By December, the League had outgrown Puthuff's studio, and rented space in the Blanchard Music Hall and Art Gallery, at 10th & Figueroa Streets.

"One of the most interesting of the art schools in Los Angeles is the Art Students League. Only a little over a year old, it is still in its beginnings. Yet its growth has been steady, and there can be no doubt, it seems to me, that it will someday be a great power for artistic good in our community." — Antony Anderson, The Los Angeles Times

Warren T. Hedges bought out Puthuff's share in the League in 1907, and became the school's second director. Hedges had been a student of painter Robert Henri, and embraced Henri's philosophy that an artist should paint scenes of contemporary life, capturing its energy through the use of bold color and vigorous brushwork. This was in contrast to the more conservative aesthetic of Puthuff and the California Impressionists. Puthuff and Anderson also had been among the eleven founding members of The Painters' Club of Los Angeles, a group of men artists that met every two weeks in each other's studios. In a diplomatic gesture, Hedges invited the Painters' Club to hold its meetings and exhibitions at the League. The Painters' Club reorganized as the California Art Club in 1909, and (grudgingly) evolved into admitting women.

One of the attractions of the League under Hedges was the regular availability of a nude model for the sketching and painting classes. Hedges hired champion bodybuilder and Los Angeles Athletic Club trainer Al Treloar as one of the models.

=== Slinkard ===
Rex Slinkard was an alumnus of the League, and had been the beneficiary of a 1908 League scholarship that enabled him to study under Robert Henri in New York City. Following Hedges's untimely death in January 1910, 23-year-old Slinkard was recruited to be the chief instructor at the League, and soon became the school's director. Carl Sprinchorn, another student of Henri, was hired to teach alongside Slinkard.

"For the present, instructors of the ASL of LA are pupils of Robert Henri of NY—and you know what that means! You know, at once, that they are strictly up-to-date in their artistic ideas, that they are the most modern of the moderns, and that they are smashing academic traditions with every vigorous stroke of charcoal stick or paintbrush." — Antony Anderson, The Los Angeles Times

Slinkard was a dynamic teacher and extremely popular with the students. He taught at the League for fewer than three years, before "a hasty marriage to his pregnant model" led to his resignation in January 1913. Sprinchorn assumed the directorship following Slinkard's abrupt departure, but himself left after less than a year.

=== MacDonald-Wright ===
Following a period of slow decline, the League was re-invigorated in the 1920s under the leadership of Stanton Macdonald-Wright, yet another League alumnus. He moved the school to new quarters at the Lyceum Theatre, and professionalized its curriculum. MacDonald-Wright stayed for nine years, but the school suffered an even greater decline during the Great Depression. Two of his students, James Redmond and Don Totten, attempted to turn things around, but the school was eventually reduced to little more than evening sketch classes.

=== World War II ===
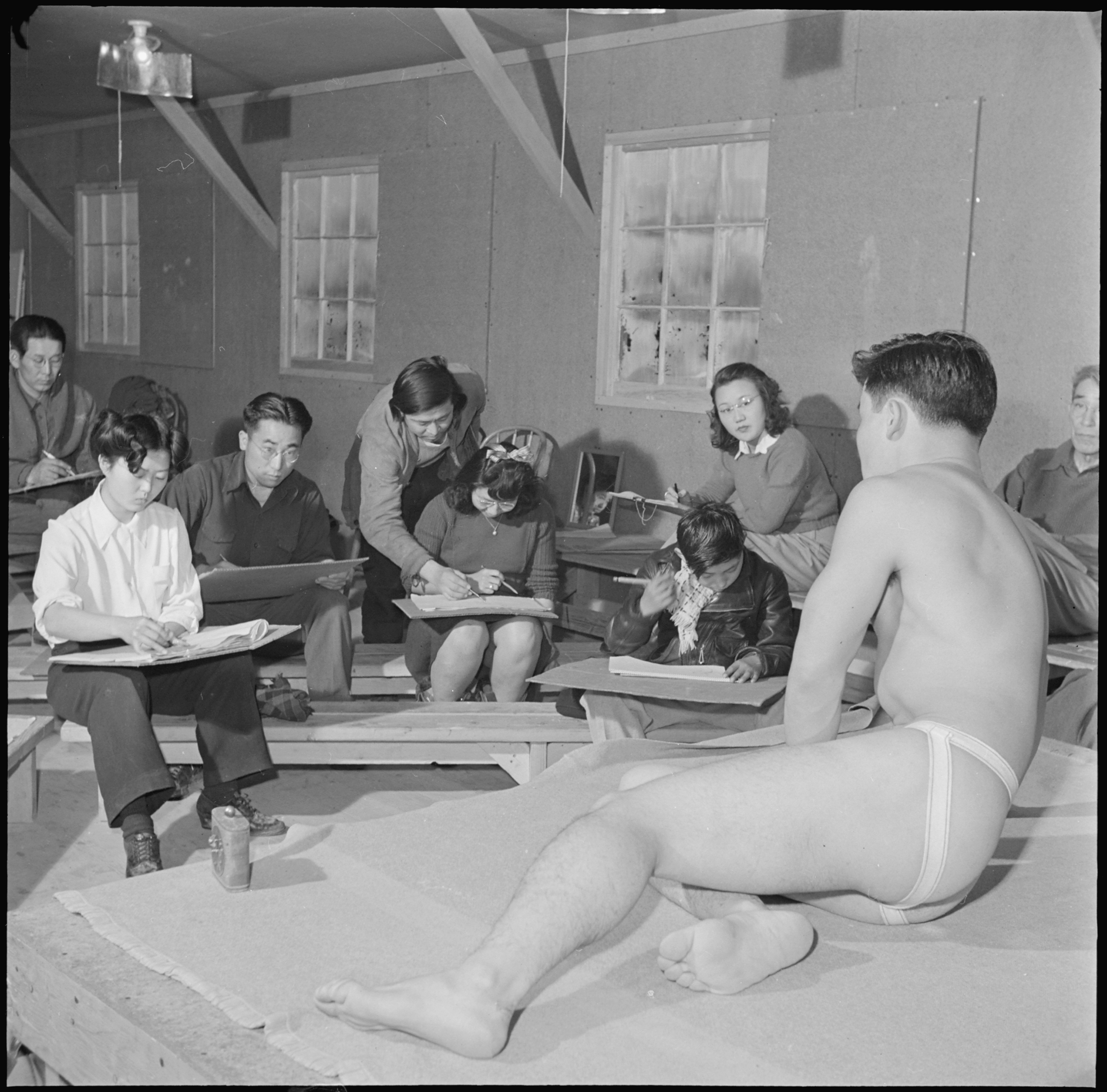
Benji Okubo instructing a life class at Heart Mountain Relocation Center, 1943

Japanese-American students Benji Okubo and Hideo Date sustained the League into 1942, when they were "evacuated" to Heart Mountain Relocation Center in Wyoming. They founded an Art Students League in the internment camp, where Okubo taught until their release in September 1945.

=== Post-war revival ===
The Art Students League of Los Angeles was revived after the war under the directorship of alumnus Fred Sexton. He reopened the school in 1949, in the same space at the Lyceum Theatre that had been its home from 1924 to 1942. It was financially unsuccessful, even after he moved classes to his private studio, and the school closed in 1953.

== Directors ==
- Hanson Duvall Puthuff, 1906–1907
- Warren T. Hedges, 1907–1910
- Charles C. Christadoro, 1910–1911
- Rex Slinkard, 1911–1913
- Carl Sprinchorn, 1913–1914
- Valentine J. Costello, 1914–1923
- Stanton Macdonald-Wright, 1923–1932
- James Redmond, 1932–1938
- Donald Totten, 1938–1940
- Benji Okubo, 1940–1942
- Fred Sexton, 1949–1953

== Notable alumni ==
- Mabel Alvarez (1891–1985)
- Carl Anderson (1903–1989)
- Lauren Barton
- Ben Berlin (1895–1989)
- Nick Brigante (became a League instructor)
- Conrad Buff (1890–1970, 1886–1975)
- Pruett Carter (1891–1955)
- Herman Cherry (1909–1992)
- Mary Campbell Craig
- Bert Cressey (1883–1944)
- Hideo Date (1907–2005) (became a League instructor)
- Boris Deutsch (1892–1978) (became a League instructor)
- Helena Dunlap (1876–1955)
- Louisa Etcheverry
- Earl Freeman
- Harwell Hamilton Harris (1903–1990)
- Sam Hyde Harris (1889–1977)
- William von Herwig (1901–1947)
- John Huston (1906–1987)
- Dorothy Jeakins (1914–1995)
- Albert Henry King (became a League instructor)
- Stanton Macdonald-Wright (1890–1973) (became a League instructor and director)
- Arthur Millier (1893–1975)
- Lawrence Murphy (1872–1947)
- Archie Musick (1902–1978)
- Kinichi Nakanishi
- Benji Okubo (1904–1975) (became a League instructor and director)
- Edith H. Osborne
- James Redmond (became a League instructor and director)
- Everett Richardson (1876–1953)
- Paul Sample (1896–1974)
- Earnford Sconhoft (became a League instructor)
- Margaret Scott (born 1947)
- Fred Sexton (1907–1995) (became a League instructor and director)
- Gwain Noot Sexton (1909–2007; formerly Gwain Harriet Noot)
- Rex Slinkard (1887–1918) (became a League instructor and director)
- Donald R. Smith (1909–?)
- Carl Sprinchorn (1887–1971) (became a League instructor and director)
- Frank L. Stevens
- Donald Totten (1903–1967) (became a League instructor and director)
- Carl Winter (1906–1966)
