= Benji Okubo =

American-Japanese painter (1904–1975)

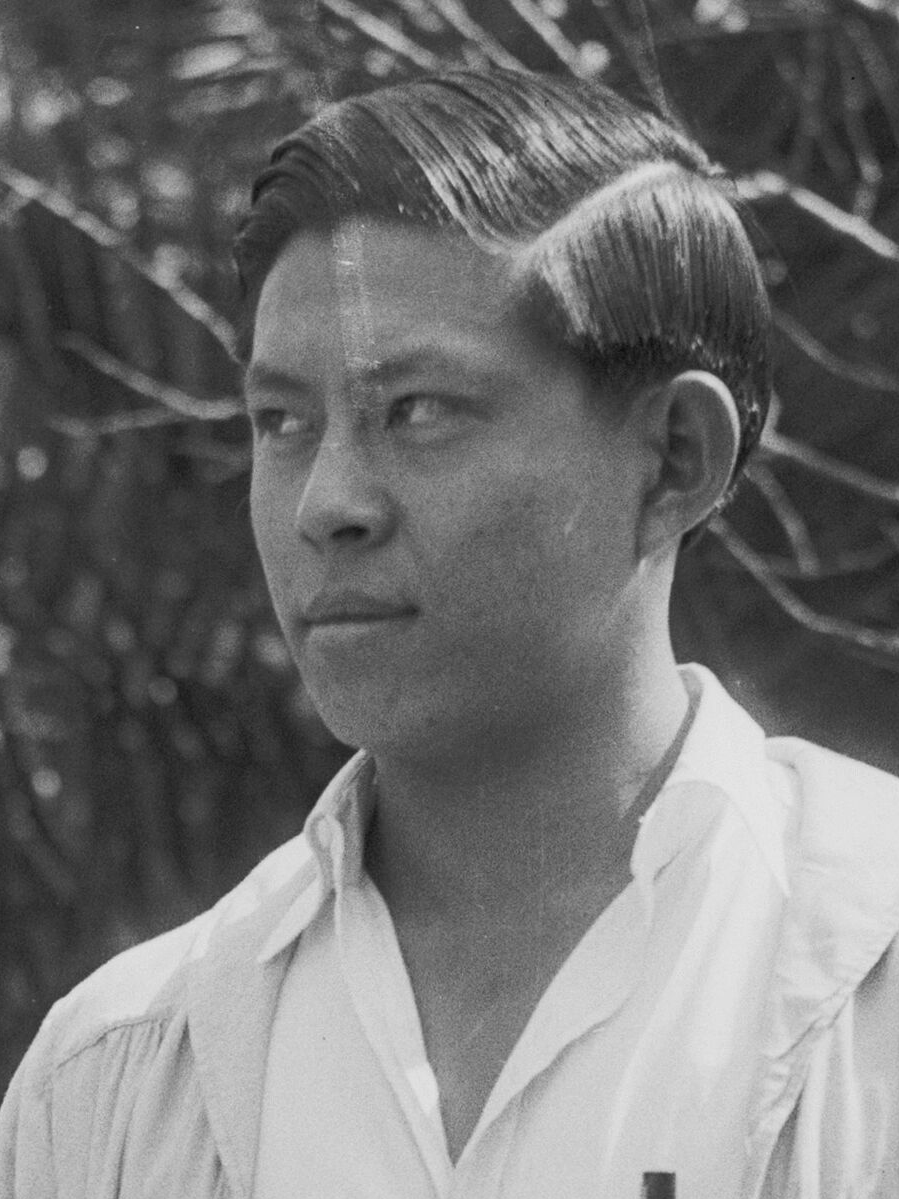
- Okubo in 1928
- Born: October 27, 1904; Riverside, California, U.S.
- Died: April 15, 1975 (aged 70); Los Angeles, California, U.S.
- Education: Otis College of Art and Design; Art Students League of Los Angeles
- Known for: Painting, landscape design
- Spouse: Chisato Takashima Okubo
- Parents: Tometsugu "Frank" Okubo (father); Miejoko Kato (mother)
- Relatives: Miné Okubo (sister)

Benji Okubo (Japanese: 大久保 辨二, October 27, 1904 – April 15, 1975) was an American-Japanese oil and watercolor painter, teacher, and landscape designer. He mainly focused on his landscape paintings which he was most accomplished in. He was born and raised in Riverside, California. He was the eldest of the seven children of Tometsugu "Frank" Okubo and Miejoko Kato. Artist Miné Okubo was his sister.

== Education and early life ==
Okubo was the eldest of seven children, his father, Tometsugu Okubo worked as gardener as well as at a candy factory. Okubo's mother, Miejoko, graduated the Tokyo art institute and worked as a calligrapher and painter. Miejoko encouraged her children to explore their creative interests. Both parents were first generation immigrants from Japan. Okubo studied on scholarship at the Otis Art Institute in Los Angeles, 1927-1929, where he was awarded prizes and worked on his art. When the Otis institute published "El Dorado, Land of Gold" which depicted the history of California and was illustrated by students of the Otis institute, Okubo was chosen to design the cover. He studied under Stanton Macdonald-Wright at the Art Students League of Los Angeles, and later collaborated with him. Okubo's work was part of group exhibitions at the San Francisco Art Museum and the Los Angeles County Museum of Art.

== Internment camps ==
Okubo served as director of the Art Students League from 1940 to mid-1942, when he was interned at the Pomona Assembly Center outside Los Angeles. The momentum of Okubo's career came to a sudden halt when he was transferred to a internment camp at the Heart Mountain Relocation Center in Wyoming following the attack on Pearl Harbor during World War II. While at the camp he instructed a life class. He and fellow artist Hideo Date also initiated evening and Saturday art classes, which they referred to as the Art students league of heart mountain. Date soon withdrew from teaching, but Okubo taught until his release in September 1945. Estelle Peck Ishigo was one of his students. Chisato Takashima was another student, and they married in Billings, Montana on June 12, 1945.

== Later life ==
Okubo returned to his landscape design business after his internment. He and his wife had a daughter, Mi-Ya Okubo.

Following his death, widow Chisato Takashima Okubo donated his paintings to the Japanese American National Museum in Los Angeles.

== Selected works ==
- Vision of the Blue Lily (Self-Portrait) (c.1930s), private collection
- Untitled (Green-Faced Woman (c.1930s), Japanese American National Museum, Los Angeles
- Woman with Cat (c.1942-1945), Japanese American National Museum, Los Angeles
- Untitled (Dungeon: Well of Sorrow) (c.1942-1945), Japanese American National Museum, Los Angeles
- Untitled (Impaled Soldier) (c.1942-1945), Japanese American National Museum, Los Angeles
- Untitled (Hand of God) (c.1942-1945), Japanese American National Museum, Los Angeles
- Atom Bomb (1945), Japanese American National Museum, Los Angeles
