= Al Treloar =

American bodybuilder, author and artist's model

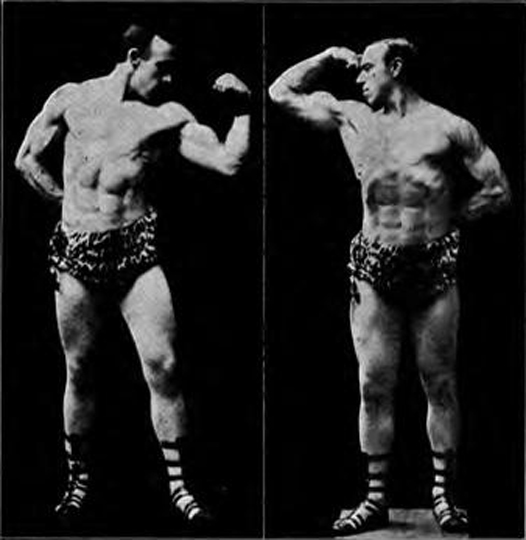
Al Treloar, posing for Physical Culture (1904)

Al Treloar (May 11, 1873 – February 28, 1960) was an American bodybuilder, athletic trainer, artist's model and author. He won the first international bodybuilding contest in 1904, toured the United States as a vaudeville performer, and appeared in early silent films. He was physical director at the Los Angeles Athletic Club from 1907 to 1949.

== Biography ==
Treloar was born Alfred Toof Jennings, the only child of Albert and Frances Toof Jennings of Allegan, Michigan. His father was a lawyer and educator, who served as superintendent of schools for Allegan until 1874. Treloar attended high school in Manistee, Michigan, where his father was superintendent of schools until 1897.

Chicago hosted the 1893 World's Columbian Exposition, a six-month world's fair that attracted tens of millions of visitors. Showman Florenz Ziegfeld created an evening vaudeville production at the city's Trocadero nightclub, centered around German bodybuilder Eugen Sandow. Twenty-year-old bodybuilder Treloar was hired to be one of Sandow's onstage assistants. The production opened on August 1, 1893, and consisted of a series of athletic acts—acrobats, cyclists, trapeze artists—interspersed with musical interludes (during which food and drink were served). Sandow appeared in the third hour, flexing and striking the poses of famous statues. After various demonstrations of feats of strength, the show's climax was Sandow lifting a barbell with a large wicker basket attached to each end. While held in the air by Sandow, the baskets opened to reveal a man inside each. At the end of the Fair, Treloar toured with the production to the West Coast and elsewhere.

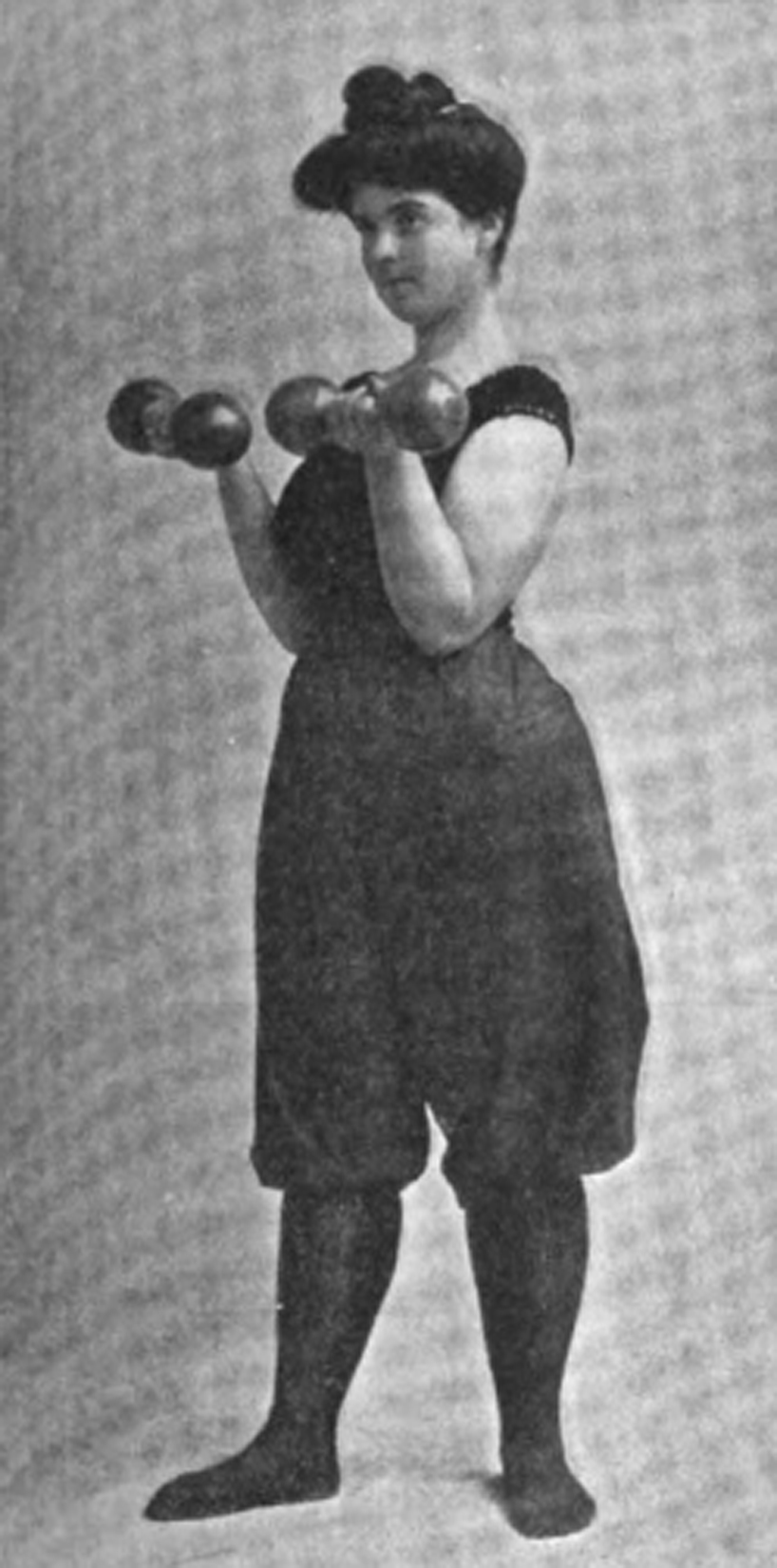
"Edna Tempest" (Georgia K. Treloar) in a 1900 photograph

Treloar enrolled in the Lawrence Scientific School of Harvard College in 1894. He studied independently under lecturer Dudley Allen Sargent, director of the Hemenway Gymnasium, and perhaps the foremost American expert on physical education. His first year, Treloar rowed on both the varsity and freshmen crew teams. "His rowing was crude, but he was a man of remarkable physique." He set University strength records—lifting 520 kg (1,150 lb) with his legs, and 355 kg (783 lb) with his back.

He met his future wife while at Harvard. Georgia Edna Knowlton (1875–1946) was two years younger, originally from Maine, and also a fitness enthusiast. They were married in Boston on October 5, 1895. She was his partner in multiple areas—under the pseudonym "Edna Tempest," she appeared as a fitness model on the cover of Physical Culture magazine, she was his onstage assistant in their vaudeville act, and she contributed a chapter to his book on muscular development.

Treloar graduated from Harvard in 1896 with a special degree in physical education, and remained in Cambridge for a year to coach the freshman crew team. He continued his career as a trainer at an athletic club in St. Paul, Minnesota, and later offered private lessons in New York City.

=== Physical Culture ===
Bernarr Macfadden, editor and publisher of Physical Culture magazine, organized the first international bodybuilding contest in America. The contest was "international" in that it included bodybuilders from both the United States and England, but all the contestants were among the 100,000 readers of Physical Culture.

Treloar and Miss Marshall, Prize Winners at the Physical Culture Show in Madison Square Garden, Edison Studios, January 16, 1904

One of the most remarkable and unique expositions ever given in this country will be the First Physical Culture Exhibition, which will be held at the Madison Square Garden, New York City, during the week beginning December 28 and ending January 2. The Exhibition is being given for the purpose of calling attention of the public to the vast value of physical culture. The magnificent specimens of manhood and womanhood that have entered the contests for the two $1,000 prizes will tend, in themselves, to prove what can be done by persistent attention to the great laws of health. Every physical culturalist who has good reason for believing that he is especially strong, or that he is especially well developed, should enter into some of these contests. The prizes offered for both men and women are attractive and liberal.

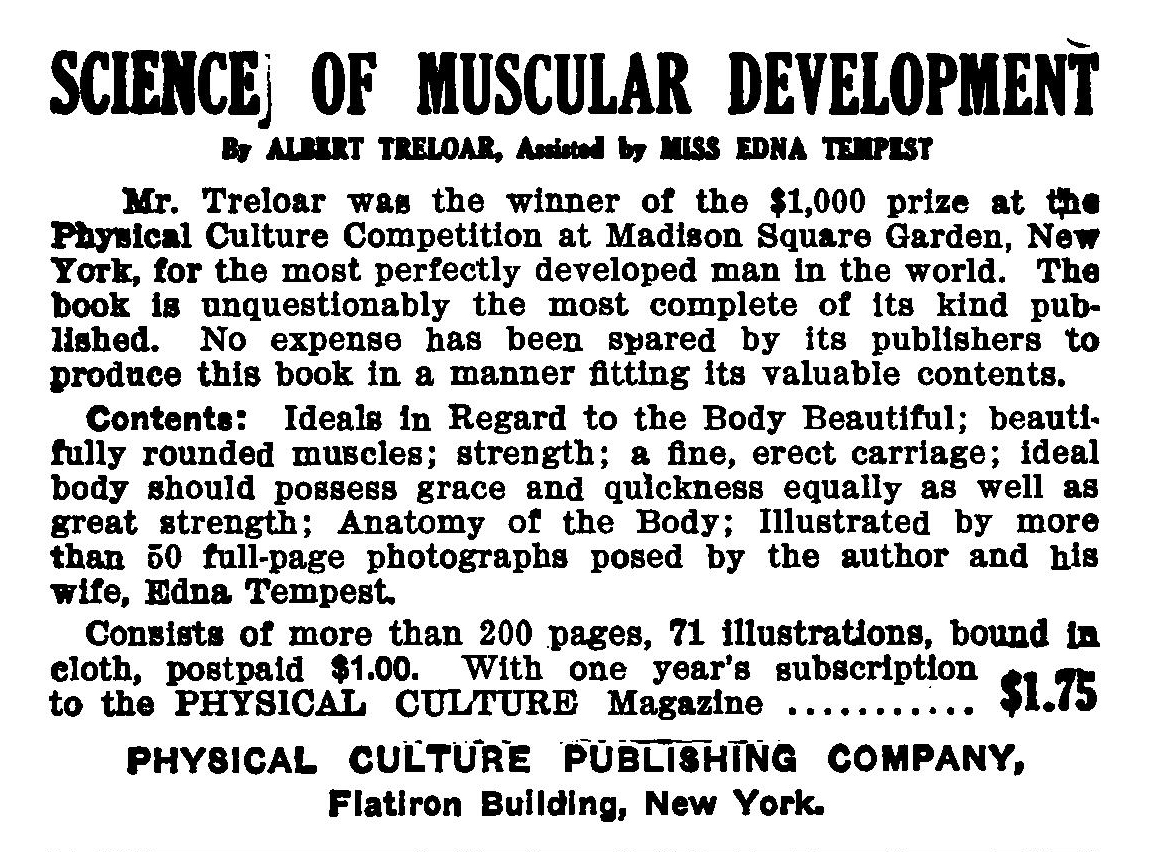
1906 ad for Treloar's book

The New York Times listed demonstrations of "almost every form of competitive exercises," including "fencing by women, racing and jumping contests by girls and women; wrestling, … running and jumping races by boys, … and a number of Amateur Athletic Union events." The culmination of the six-day athletic extravaganza came on January 2, when Hugh Jennings (Treloar) (Note: Treloar's registration in the exhibition under the name "Hugh" Jennings is unexplained. He was already working in vaudeville under the name "Treloar.") was judged to be the "Most Perfectly Developed Man" and Emma Newkirk to be the "Most Perfectly Developed Woman."

On January 16, 1904, Edison Studios filmed Treloar and Beatrice Marshall (3rd-place winner among the women) in the silent short: Treloar and Miss Marshall, Prize Winners at the Physical Culture Show in Madison Square Garden. Treloar appeared on the March 1904 cover of Physical Culture wearing his leopard-print trunks and Roman sandals.

Treloar was the author of a major book on bodybuilding: Treloar's Science of Muscular Development: A Textbook of Physical Training (1904), to which his wife (as Edna Tempest) contributed a chapter for women. Macfadden published the book, and illustrated it with photographs of Treloar and Tempest demonstrating the exercises.

Treloar flexed and posed in a May 3, 1905 silent short, Al Treloar in Muscle Exercises, filmed by American Mutoscope and Biograph Company. A poster of Treloar "wearing a pair of sandals and a leopard's skin as a breech-cloth" was deemed "obscene" by Anthony Comstock, founder of the New York Society for the Suppression of Vice. Police raided the offices of Physical Culture magazine and arrested Macfadden in October 1905, but he was acquitted.

=== Vaudeville ===
Treloar and Tempest toured together in vaudeville, performing a 12-minute "Strongman act" in three scenes, twice a day, six days a week.

Treloar, billed as an "Ex-Harvard Varsity Oarsman and Champion Athlete, and Exponent of Modern Physical Culture," put on an act that was neat and interesting from start to finish. He was assisted by Edna Tempest, and began with several poses shown in a large frame, in which his really superb muscular development was shown to great advantage. Later on he used his assistant in showing his lifting powers, and the plan was a welcome change from the clumsy, cumbersome weights generally used by strong men.

In 1906, they added a stunt as memorable as Sandow's "human barbell" from 1893. Tempest drove an electric car onto the stage and up a ramp onto a raised platform—while Treloar, crouching underneath, in a single back lift raised the platform, car, Tempest and five assistants. Variety wrote: "Treloar and Edna Tempest, act much changed and improved."

From 1903 to 1907, I devoted my entire time to vaudeville engagements, appearing in every first-class vaudeville theatre in the United States, including the Keith theatres. My stunt consisted of posturing and feats of strength, and I was billed under the stage name of Al Treloar.

=== Los Angeles ===
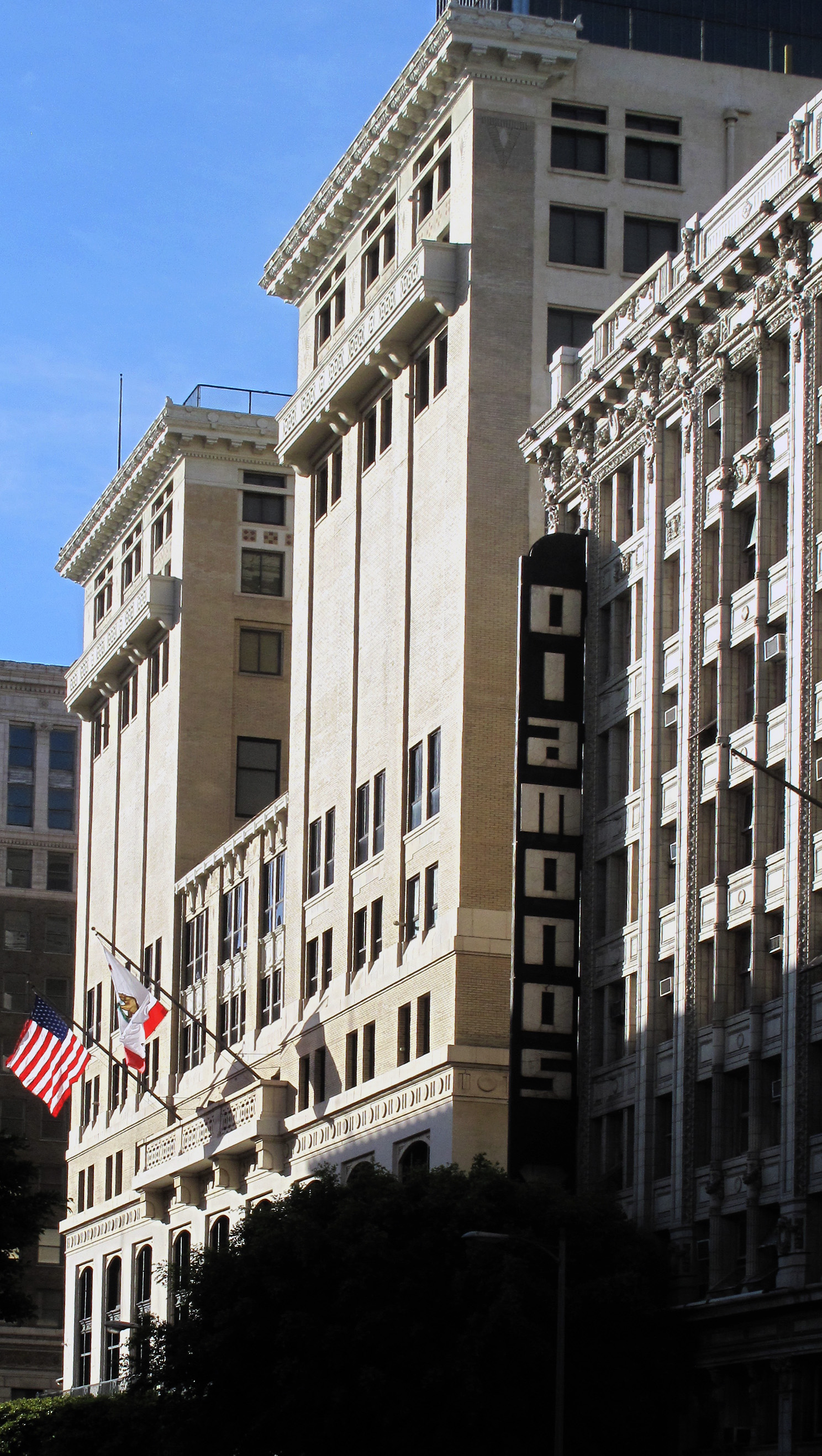
Los Angeles Athletic Club, 431 West 7th Street, L.A.

The Los Angeles Athletic Club offered Treloar the position of physical director, and he began work there in February 1907. He wrote a weekly column on health and exercise for the club's newsletter, and recommended healthier choices that were added to the menu of the club's dining room.

Al. G. Treloar, physical instructor, has been trained by many years of practical work and almost can see at a glance what his many pupils require in the line of physical training. He was born in Allegan, Michigan, in 1873, and graduated from the Manistee high school at an early age. He then entered Harvard university, where he took up the normal course in physical training, and after graduating from the university acted as coach for the Harvard freshman rowing crew for one year. He then accepted the position of physical instructor of the St. Paul Athletic club. Later he taught privately, and for ten years he traveled all over the country, giving private lessons to a host of pupils who had heard of his system of teaching. In January, 1907, the directors of the Los Angeles Athletic club learned of his success and lost no time in employing him. The veteran coach of Stanford university, "Dad" Moulton, since has termed him "one of the finest instructors in the country." In addition to teaching wrestling and coaching the four-oar crews of the club, Treloar is an expert on the flying rings, traveling rings, horizontal bars, parallel bars, vaulting horse and buck, pulley weights, both upper and lower back, wrist machine, finger machine, vertical bars and punching bags, in all of which he gives daily instruction to large classes of members.

=== Personal ===
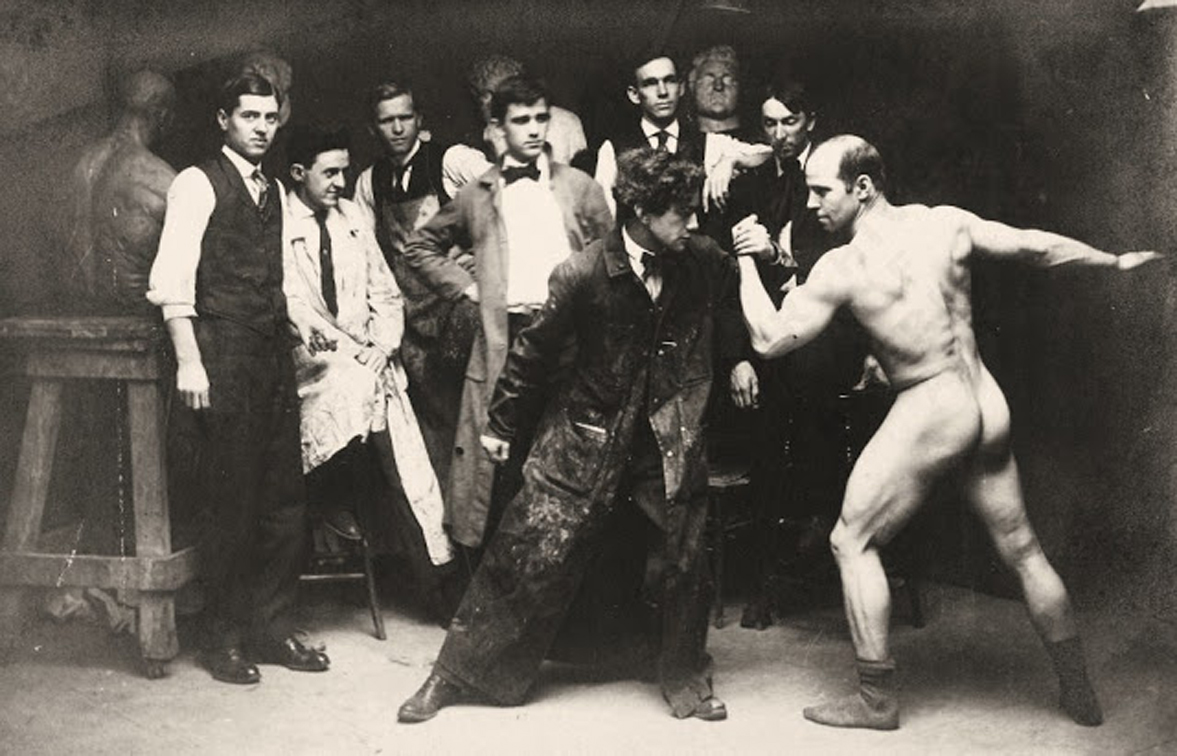
Al Treloar, nude, hand-wrestling at the Art Students League of Los Angeles, c.1912

Treloar began posing for life classes at the Art Students League of Los Angeles in March 1907.

Al J. and Georgia K. Treloar were living in Los Angeles at the time of the 1940 U.S. Census.

Treloar held the position of physical director at the Los Angeles Athletic Club for 42 years, from 1907 to his retirement at age 76 in 1949. He coached hundreds of men.

Al J. Treloar died on February 28, 1960 at age 86, in Los Angeles.

=== Legacy ===
Treloar brought professional bodybuilding to Southern California, which by the mid-20th century would become the sport's "unofficial world's headquarters."

The Ernest Edward Coffin Collection at the National Museum of American History holds a collection of Treloar's papers.
