= Carl Sprinchorn =

American painter

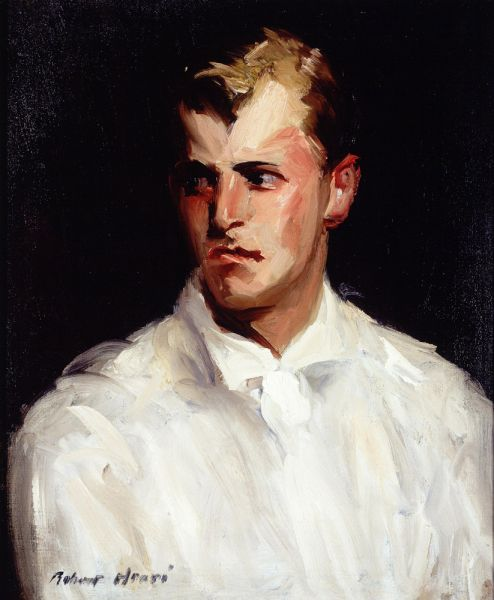
- Portrait of Carl Sprinchorn by Robert Henri, 1910
- Born: May 13, 1887; Broby, Sweden
- Died: September 6, 1971 (aged 84); Albany, New York
- Known for: Artist

Carl Sprinchorn (1887–1971) was a Swedish-born American artist who studied under Robert Henri and who adopted a style of realist modernism that admiring critics saw as both abstract and revolutionary. His oil paintings and works on paper showed a wide range of subjects. He made cityscapes and street scenes, seascapes and beach scenes, bucolic landscapes and farm scenes. He drew famous dancers, society figures, and both urban and rural men at work. As one critic put the matter, "He has the rare quality of making whatever subject he essays interesting and unusual, be it bouquets of flowers, riders in six-day bicycle races, Spanish dancers or straight American landscape." He achieved acclaim for pictures he made while living in New York and during extensive travels. In 1918, a critic said his drawings showed the kind of "bold pen outline" and gift for "incisive statement" that could be seen in work by British caricaturist, Thomas Rowlandson. Another critic noted a "sensuous, aristocratic nostalgia" in Sprinchorn's urban scenes, describing them as "delicate, suggestive impressions." Throughout much of his career Sprinchorn's floral paintings in oil, pastel, and watercolor also attracted critical attention. Reviewing watercolors exhibited in 1928, a critic praised a "subtle relation of colors" in a floral work and said that "if colors could sing," these would "chant melodiously." Sprinchorn made extensive visits to camps and hamlets in the North Maine Woods and the paintings and drawings he made there came to be his most celebrated works. Regarding a cluster of posthumous exhibitions held in 2002, a critic wrote, "In Sprinchorn's hands, the Maine woods come alive through the actions of men who are most comfortable among the trees: hunters, trappers, lumberjacks and river drivers, mostly. These large, rugged images are full of earthy colors that recall the blue-chill of winter, the blaze-orange glow of autumn and the shadowy scenes that accompany nighttime campfires..."

Writing in 2002, a biographer wrote of a contrast between the sophisticated urban focus of much of Sprinchorn's work and the unsophisticated rural focus of his output from the forests of Maine. Calling him a "composite of opposites," she said he was as much at home in the New York art world with its sophisticated artists and wealthy patrons as he was in rural boarding houses and lumber camps.

== Early life and education ==
In a 1974 letter to a friend Sprinchorn said he had determined to emigrate from Sweden after reading about an inspiring teacher named Robert Henri. (Note: He also reportedly said he was "the first person ever to come to America for the purpose of studying art.") Although he was just fifteen when he set off for New York and although he spoke only Swedish, he knew that one of his older sisters—then working as a maid to a family in Manhattan—would help him make the difficult transition after he arrived. He landed in New York on October 30, 1903, and enrolled in the New York School of Art eight days later. Sprinchorn later said that his study under Robert Henri was the most important factor in the development of his career. Although Henri knew no Swedish, Sprinchorn advanced quickly in his studies by means of gestures and eye contact to understand Henri's critiques of his work. For his part, Henri considered Sprinchorn to be one of his best students. In 1909 he said that Sprinchorn knew virtually nothing about art when he began but he quickly learned to paint with "virility and character."

== Career in art ==
Sprinchorn's career began while he was still a student. After a little more than two years of study, he was awarded two honorable mentions for a drawing and paintings that were shown in an exhibition of school work at the New York School of Art. Early in 1907 a painting of his called "A Winter Scene on the East Side, New York," was accepted by jurors for the National Academy of Design annual exhibition, but, following a protest from Henri regarding other paintings that had been rejected, the academy decided not to hang Sprinchorn's, giving lack of space as the reason. Angered by the decision Henri said the academy should not rebuff innovative young artists like Sprinchorn. He praised Sprinchorn for catching "a big new note" and placing it upon canvas "with haunting effect" and added that he knew of "few more promising painters." A few months later a critic for the New York Sun discussed Sprinchorn's paintings that were hung in another of the New York School's student shows. He praised a Sprinchorn painting called "Ferryboat in Snowstorm," saying that it violated "every canon of academic art" in showing "things as they are." Another critic said Sprinchorn was a promising artist whose work was "painted with a feeling of largeness." Early in 1908 he contributed paintings to an exhibition of work by Henri and his students at the National Arts Club. Of a Sprinchorn painting called "Winter Day," a critic wrote, "It is realism pushed to the eleventh degree. No mercy is shown to optical sentimentalists."

Sprinchorn followed Henri when, in January 1909, he founded a school of his own and then left the following year to pursue a career as a professional artist. Between 1907 and 1909 Sprinchorn had served as manager of the New York School of Art and he continued to serve that function during his time in the new Henri school.

At this time a critic saw Sprinchorn as "one of the younger members of the new 'revolutionary' school of artists, who, as a body, have met with so little encouragement from the juries of the National Academy of Design." Early in 1910 Sprinchorn had a painting accepted for the 105th annual exhibition at the Pennsylvania Academy of Fine Arts and a little later he exhibited at the Rand School in New York along with Henri and men who had studied under Henri. The list of participants included George Bellows, George Luks, and John Sloan.

Although he usually lived in New York, Sprinchorn traveled widely throughout his career. During late 1912 and early 1913 he lived in Los Angeles, California. During 1914 and 1915 he lived in Paris where he attended sketch classes at the Académie Colarossi. He often spent summer months in artists' colonies near the water: in Provincetown, Massachusetts, in Ogunquit, Maine, and on Monhegan Island, Maine. He returned to Scandinavia from time to time to paint and visit with his family.

In 1910 he made his first visit to a location in north-central Maine that would soon become a favorite. He was invited by a family friend to visit Monson, a town where there was a small community of Swedish immigrants. During the winter months Monson was home to the camps of loggers who took advantage of swollen streams and rivers to transport wood to lumber mills further south and east. Having previously become known for scenes of blizzards and heavy snowfall in the slums of Manhattan, Sprinchorn seems to have felt comfortable depicting the work of these loggers and the environment in which they spent the cold months of the year. (Note: In addition to the ones already named, Sprinchorn's pictures of New York winters include "After a Snowstorm," and "The Blizzard," both painted before 1908.) As his career matured Sprinchorn would re-visit Monson and other locales in the North Maine Woods over the next three decades and would spend most of his time there in the years between 1942 and 1952. At the time of his death, Sprinchorn's paintings, drawings, and watercolors from the Maine forests would come to be seen as his dominant subjects and most popular works.

While in southern California between 1912 and 1914, Sprinchorn taught at the Art Students League and served for a time as its director.

In 1915 he was one of eleven "representative American painters" selected for an exhibition in the main gallery of the fine arts building at the Panama–California Exposition in San Diego, California. (Note: In addition to Sprinchorn, the representative American painters were George Bellows, Ernest Lawson, Robert Henri, Childe Hassam, John Sloan, Guy Pène du Bois, Maurice Prendergast, J.H. Sharp, George Luks, and William Glackens.) Later that year he participated in a group exhibition at the New York MacDowell Club and the following year showed drawings in a solo exhibition sponsored by George S. Hellman. (Note: George S. Hellman (1878-1958) was born into the Seligman banking family of New York. He was a well-known author and editor as well as art critic and collector. He was a member of the New Gallery Art Club. He was also a rare book, manuscript, and art dealer who sold through New York galleries and auction rooms.) In reviewing the latter, a critic for the New York Sun said he drew with spirit and grace, with a youthful quality that the critic found refreshing. In 1918 he showed drawings again in an exhibition at the Scandinavian Art Shop. On this occasion a critic recognized an affinity to English artist Thomas Rowlandson but noted that Sprinchorn saw things in a more fragmentary manner, in angles rather than curves, and with more biting humor. The critic concluded by saying Sprinchorn was "amazingly skillful in obtaining the richest and most splendid results by holding back the full force of his pigment, and suggesting reserves of color behind the surface painting."

Sprinchorn showed three times in 1920, once with other Swedish-American artists at the American-Scandinavian Foundation, once with a group that included Anne Rector at the National Arts Club, and once in an exhibition of the Society of Independent Artists. In reviewing the first of the three, a Times critic said Sprinchorn contributed "two large paintings of great distinction" and drawings that were even stronger. The year 1922 was a fruitful one for Sprinchorn. In January Hamilton Easter Field's journal, The Arts, printed an article by the literary theorist Kenneth Burke called "The Art of Carl Sprinchorn." Burke analyzed Sprinchorn's technique in detail. Drawing attention to his use of visual metaphor, Burke said he used abstraction to make his subjects serve multiple purposes in his paintings. As an example, he said "Carl Sprinchorn begins with snow, and adds something else, while the snow remains. He manages to put on his canvas both the object and his interpretation of it." In that month and the next Sprinchorn showed watercolors and drawings in the Junior Art Painters gallery (Note: In May 1921, Mrs. William K. Vanderbilt and other art patrons organized the Junior Art Patrons group to provide financial support for young, impecunious artists and show their work in rented gallery space. The group aimed to encourage young city residents to appreciate and buy pictures from living artists.) and paintings and works on paper in Mrs. Sterner's gallery. (Note: Marie Sterner ran the gallery that bore her name from 1920 to 1950. Her gallery was successful in introducing talented American and European artists to collectors. Born Marie Walther, she first married a man named Albert Sterner and, having divorced him, married again to a man named Edward Lintott.) In later months the Worcester Art Museum gave a solo exhibition of his recent work. At the end of the year he participated in a group show at the New Gallery that he had himself assembled. The show at the Sterner Gallery drew extensive critical examination from The Arts magazine, the Brooklyn Daily Eagle, and New York Herald newspapers. In The Arts, literary theorist Kenneth Burke said that in eliminating detail Sprinchorn achieved a "truer interpretation" of his subjects. In the Brooklyn Daily Eagle Hamilton Easter Field wrote that he shared the enthusiasm of Sprinchorn's "most ardent admirers." The New York Herald's critic said of Sprinchorn's work, "It's abstract, but it's healthy and fine." In his introduction to the catalog of the exhibition, the art critic, curator, and collector, Christian Brinton, described what he saw as Sprinchorn's "eager, ceaseless odyssey in quest of fresh plastic and chromatic stimulus." (Note: Christian Brinton (1870-1942) was an art critic from a prominent Quaker family who championed modern art in exhibition catalogs, articles, and books.)

Between 1922 and 1925 Sprinchorn was art director of the New Gallery which exhibited and sold works by little-known American artists and avant-garde European ones. (Note: In 1942 Sprinchorn wrote that this job gave him "the means but not the time to work." He said he arranged exhibitions of works by American artists of his generation as well as by Europeans with "established reputations," such as Matisse, Modigliani, Cézanne, and others. The New Gallery was founded in November 1922 by James N. Rosenberg, a lawyer, painter, and philanthropist. It aimed to present "pictures which are something more than slick and servile patterns of the past." It was financed in part by an innovative scheme, the New Gallery Club, begun in February 1923. The club supported the gallery through its membership fees and it raised funds and publicized exhibitions by means of entertainments, teas, and receptions. Many club members were amateur artists whose work the gallery showed in special exhibitions.) His works were frequently shown in group exhibitions during the 1920s and early 1930s: at the New Gallery in 1923 and 1924; at the Whitney Studio Club in 1924; at the Brooklyn Museum in 1925, 1926, 1928, and 1929; at the Marie Sterner Gallery in 1928, 1930, and 1933; at the Roerich Museum in 1929; and at the Fifty-Sixth Street Galleries in 1930. He held solo exhibitions during these years at his own studio (1924 and 1933), the Rhen Galleries (1927), the Ainslie Gallery in 1928, the Penthouse Gallery (1930), and the Sullivan Gallery (1936). The American Swedish Historical Museum gave him a solo exhibition in 1942. In 1930 the owner of the Sullivan Gallery, Mrs. Cornelius Sullivan, organized a tour of his work in three museums. In the decade following 1920 The Dial magazine published many of his drawings and he also earned income for illustrations he produced for the Ford Motor Company.

Sprinchorn used his earnings from his job at the New Gallery and other sources to fund a year and a half of travel in Puerto Rico and Santo Domingo in 1926 and 1927. Afterward, he returned to Sweden late in 1930 and early in 1931. He stayed in New York most of the time between 1931 and 1937. His work was part of the painting event in the art competition at the 1932 Summer Olympics. His work also appeared at the Whitney Museum in the second biennial exhibition in 1936 and in the annual exhibition of contemporary art in 1938. Using the money he received from sales of his art, he spent part or all of the year in Maine between 1937 and 1943, mostly living either in Patten or Shin Pond. In January 1943 Sprinchorn wrote the collector and museum director, Duncan Phillips, asking him to see the Macbeth Gallery exhibition of his works. Phillips subsequently purchased one of the paintings, "Snow Winged Horses" (1920) thus helping to fund subsequent winters in the Maine woods. During these years he showed infrequently, notably in solo exhibitions at the Macbeth Gallery (1943, 1947, and 1950), the Bertha Schaeffer Gallery (1944). As his health declined after 1950, he continued to show work from earlier decades, but painted less frequently. He lived in Manhattan from 1950 until 1956 when he moved to a farm in Selkirk, New York. The galleries in which he showed during that period include the Bertha Schaefer, Passedoit, Zabriske, and Knoedler galleries in New York. He stopped exhibiting in 1963 and died eight years later.

In 1984 the art museum at Rutgers, the State University of New Jersey, mounted a retrospective called "Carl Sprinchorn: Realist Impulse and Romantic Vision." In 1994 the Veilleux Gallery in Farmington, Maine, showed 60 paintings and works on paper from the Maine woods. A news account said that 44 of the 60 found buyers making this the most successful exhibition his work ever received. The gallery, which represented Sprinchorn's estate, held a second retrospective in 1996. An exhibition called "The Art of Carl Sprinchorn: The Katahdin Collection" appeared in the Ogunquit Museum of American Art in 1998. Three exhibitions were held in Maine during the summer of 2002: "Carl Sprinchohn: King of the Woods" at the Bates College Museum of Art, Lewiston, "Carl Sprinchorn: The Maine Woods and Beyond" at the Veilleux Gallery in Farmington, and "The Four Seasons: Carl Sprinchorn in Maine" at the New O'Farrell Gallery, Brunswick.

Despite his affection for snowy landscapes and pictures of winter occupations, Sprinchorn was never completely at home in rural Maine. One local resident, Caleb Scribner, became a friend, but Scribner was an exception. They met one another in 1937 when Sprinchorn stayed as a boarder in the home of Scribner's family in Patten, near Shin Pond. An amateur artist, Scribner could converse with Sprinchorn on topics that held no interest for other locals. In a 1946 letter to a friend Sprinchorn admitted that he had little in common "with these people who after all are not important in my life over and above the accident of sharing a roof tree and board—with them; in no sense or manner able to share my interests, problems or what not." Writing in 1988, Sprinchorn's biographer, Mary Towley Swanson, called him a "composite of opposites." He enjoyed city life and developed enduring friendships with artists and patrons in the New York art world. Throughout most of his career critics gave most of their attention to his still lifes and other indoor subjects and the few existing records of his art sales show greatest interest in this work. Yet throughout his career, he spent long periods in rural settings, and after his death critics and curators showed a strong preference for his rural paintings. Toward the end of his career Sprinchorn addressed this dual aspect of his work. In a letter to his friend Richard Sprague he wrote, "Well, I'm a city boy. I mean I'm country-born, but I am city-minded." In 1953 he wrote a friend: "I have been called a mystic. I think that I have a pantheistic spirit towards nature that prevents mere copying of nature. I have never been successful in copying nature, however sincerely, I soon got tired. I like to select and interpret nature after living close to the sources of nature—but conversely, I have been interested in the life of critics, in the sophisticated aspects of life in general—in a word, I have tried to encompass a great deal."

=== Artistic style ===
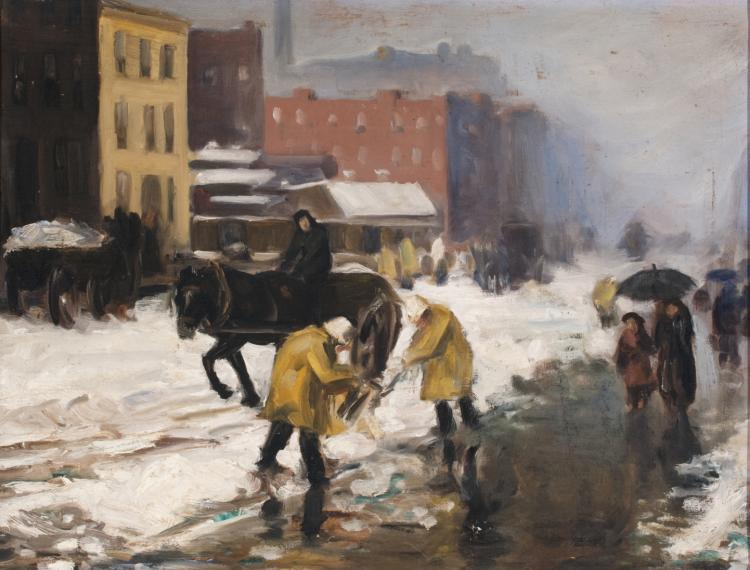
Carl Sprinchorn, After a Storm, 1906, oil on canvas, 22 x 28 inches

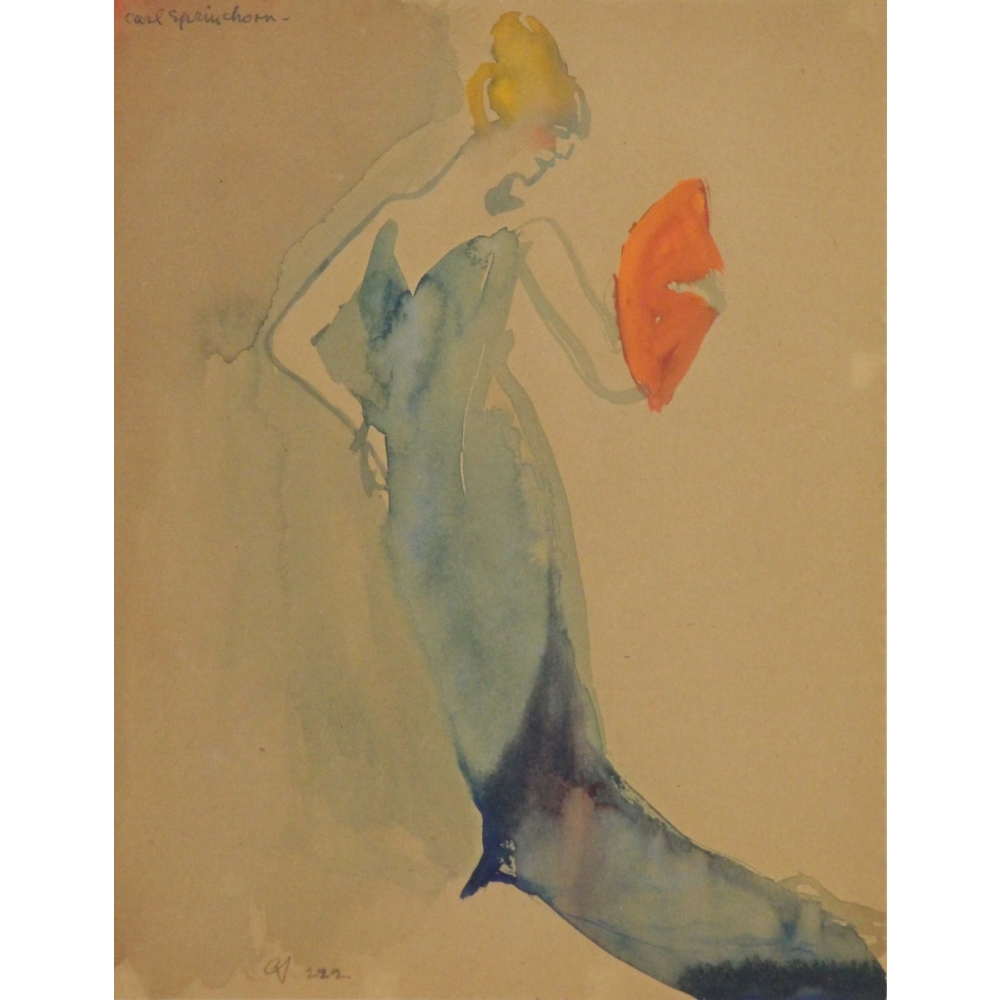
Carl Sprinchorn, Lady With a Fan, 1909, watercolor, 9.75 x 7.5 inches

Having accepted Robert Henri as teacher and mentor, Sprinchorn adopted a realist style that was then considered to be revolutionary. In defiance of decorous academic art and escapist impressionist art, the painters who studied under Henri chose subjects from the gritty urban world around them, painted with bold freedom and rapid brushwork, and strove for an immediacy of emotional expression. (Note: In 1923 Henri wrote: "When the artist is alive in any person, whatever his kind of work, he becomes an inventive, searching, daring, self-expressing creature. He disturbs, upsets, enlightens, and he opens ways for a better understanding." And again: "The art student that should be, and is so rare, is the one whose life is spent in the love and the culture of his personal sensations, the cherishing of his emotions, never undervaluing them, the pleasure of exclaiming them to others, and an eager search for their clearest expression. He never studies drawing because it will come in useful later when he is an artist. He has not time for that. He is an artist in the beginning and is busy finding the lines and forms to express the pleasures and emotions with which nature has already charged him.") In reviewing an exhibition in which his first paintings were shown, a critic said Sprinchorn's "Ferryboat in Snowstorm" offended art authorities by violating "every canon of academic art." Another said a painting of his offended "sentimentalists" by pushing realism "to the eleventh degree." (Note: In Freemasonry, the phrase "eleventh degree" connotes a pinnacle.) The 1906 painting, "After a Storm" also called "After a Snow Storm" (at right), shows Sprinchorn's style at this time. (Note: In 1907 Henri wrote that this painting showed its subjects faithfully: "New York white-wings cleaning east side streets after a snowstorm – not an idealized study but just as we have seen them." New York City's sanitation workers were then called White Wings after the white uniforms they wore.) Early in his career, Sprinchorn's works on paper attracted at least as much attention as his oil paintings. As already mentioned, he received honorable mention for a drawing in 1906, showed drawings in a 1908 group exhibition, and in 1916 had his first solo exhibition devoted to drawings. Some years later, he recalled how favorably the New York press responded to this work and said that the solo exhibition produced a large number of purchases. Sprinchorn followed Henri in his style of drawing as much as in his oil paintings. Henri told his students to make drawings not as dispassionate draftsmen but expressively and with a deep consciousness of the whole of the subject. In 1916 a critic for the New York Sun called attention to Sprinchorn's abbreviated lines and use of simplification and noted the "spirit and grace" of his drawings. Noting in Sprinchorn's drawings "a keen vision and a witty analysis," a critic for The New York Times said in 1918 that the artist was "amazingly skillful in obtaining the richest and most splendid results by holding back the full force of his pigment, and suggesting reserves of color behind the surface painting." In the early 1920s critics continued to stress his simplicity, directness, and intensity of feeling. They recognized a rejection of strictly representational presentation in favor of the compositional elements of his work. One saw in his technique a "genuine aesthetic sensibility" and another cited his ability to transform subjects into meaningful symbols.

In 1920 a critic for the Times wrote that Sprinchorn showed his talent most clearly in his drawings. The critic called them "vivid, syncopated sketches," that told "within their narrow boundaries more truths about color and form that most artists find it possible to say upon their biggest canvases." In 1922 a critic said the drawings were "expressed in spirited line and subtly modulated passages of blue, purple, pale yellow, and green. Full of genuine aesthetic sensibility, as well as a certain sensuous, aristocratic nostalgia." The same year, writing in The Arts magazine, a critic wrote that he prized "composition for its own sake," and had "almost a disdain for subject matter. He cited as an example Sprinchorn's treatment of human figures as "hardly more than theses, men without destiny or destination." Sprinchorn's "Lady with a Fan" (shown at left), shows his technique of line drawing with watercolor wash.

Carl Sprinchorn, Hunter's Luck, about 1937, oil on canvas, 26 1/8 x 34 1/8 inches

Carl Sprinchorn, Gloria October 1946, oil on canvas, 26 x 34 inches

Carl Sprinchorn, Sunflowers and Tritoma, 1935, oil on canvas, 24 x 20 inches

Sprinchorn's style changed little during the rest of his career, so little that critics writing in 2002 could echo what critics had written in the early 1920s. Both sets of critics saw freedom and boldness in his artistic sensibility and an approach that was expressive and abstract rather than objective and representational. They used terms like "free and bold" or "free and responsive" to describe his style. Both early and late in his career he was seen as imparting what one critic called "symbolic emphasis" in his work. Early and late, he was seen as a subtle colorist and was frequently cited for a forcefulness what one critic called "vigor and drive." In all periods, critics saw an emotional content in his work which one called "expressionism with abstract elements." In a post-career summation of his work a critic said what distinguished Sprinchorn's style was his "ability to set down an image with brutal personal honesty, as if he could do nothing else." Another wrote that while he "was committed to the authenticity of his subject matter, he used means similar to those employed by an abstract artist, including figure and ground relationships that diverge from normal perspective; expressive use of color; and a painterly application of paint that demonstrates relish for the act of painting." Sprinchorn's paintings, "Hunter's Luck II" (shown at right) and "Gloria October" (shown at left, illustrate these aspects of his style.

Throughout his career Sprinchorn's media were oil paintings on canvas and works on paper in watercolor, pencil, pen, wash, crayon, and charcoal.

His subjects varied widely: cityscapes of New York and landscapes of the Maine woods and tropical settings; human figures, including city laborers and rural woodsmen, as well as urban sophisticates; Scandinavian farm scenes; floral still lifes. Although his pictures of the Maine woods drew most attention after his death, he was better known for his still lifes and drawings during most of his career. Sprinchorn's "Sunflowers and Tritoma" (shown at right) illustrates is handling of a floral still life. In 1936 a critic said this painting was the liveliest of the "vivid flower paintings" he showed at the Sullivan gallery.

== Personal life and family ==
Sprinchorn was born in the village of Broby, near Kristianstad, Sweden, on May 13, 1887. His father was Claes Sprinchorn (1845–1907), a cabinetmaker who did carpentry and restored furniture. His mother was Johanna Rudolphsson (Andreasdotter) Sprinchorn (1844–1932). He was the youngest of seven children. As a child he liked to draw and, as already noted, determined to emigrate to New York so as to study under Robert Henri.

In 1956, as ill-health restricted his ability to paint and draw, he moved to the home of his sister, Mrs. Anna Johnson, in Selkirk, New York. At his death in 1971 his only known survivors were Mrs. Johnson and a niece, Mrs. Ruth Olson, also of Selkirk.
