= Arthur Millier =

American painter, etcher, printmaker, and art critic

- Born: 1893; Weston-super-Mare, England
- Died: March 30, 1975 (aged 81–82); Hackensack, New Jersey, U.S.
- Resting place: Pritchard Cemetery, Marshall, North Carolina, U.S.
- Education: Los Angeles High School
- Alma mater: Art Students League of Los Angeles; California School of Fine Arts
- Occupations: Painter, etcher, printmaker, art critic
- Spouse: Sarah Pritchard
- Children: 3

Arthur Millier (1893 – March 30, 1975) was a British-born American painter, etcher, printmaker, and art critic. He was the art critic for the Los Angeles Times from 1926 to 1958. His work is in the permanent collections of many museums in the United States.

== Life ==
Millier was born in 1893 in Weston-super-Mare, England. He emigrated to the United States and settled in Los Angeles in 1908. He was educated at the Los Angeles High School and the Art Students League of Los Angeles. After serving in World War I in France, he attended the California School of Fine Arts in San Francisco.

Millier became an etcher, printmaker and painter in San Francisco, exhibiting his work as early as 1922. He taught at the Chouinard Art Institute, Otis Art Institute, the University of Southern California, and the Pasadena Art Institute from 1922 to 1926. One of his notable students was Mildred Bryant Brooks.

He was the art critic for the Los Angeles Times from 1926 to 1958. He subsequently resumed painting watercolors in San Luis Obispo, California, and he received the Humanities Award from the National Watercolor Society in 1973.

Millier married Sarah Pritchard. They had two sons, Arthur and David, and a daughter, Mrs John Hallock. Millier died on March 30, 1975, in Hackensack, New Jersey, at age 81, and he was buried in the Pritchard Cemetery in Marshall, North Carolina. His work is in the permanent collections of the Dallas Museum of Art, the Los Angeles County Museum of Art, the Philadelphia Museum of Art, and the Art Institute of Chicago.
