= Pruett Carter =

American illustrator

- Born: February 9, 1891; Missouri, U.S.
- Died: December 1, 1955 (aged 64); Los Angeles County, California, U.S.
- Education: Art Students' League of Los Angeles; Robert Henri in New York
- Known for: Illustrator
- Elected: Hall of Fame, Society of Illustrators; 1988

Pruett Carter (9 February 1891 – 1 December 1955) was an American illustrator who taught at the Grand Central School of Art and the Chouinard Art Institute. He illustrated national magazines, and was art director for Atlanta Journal and Good Housekeeping. Carter was inducted into the Society of Illustrator's Hall of Fame in 1988.

== Early life and education ==
Carter was born in 1891 in Missouri. He grew up in Wyoming on an Indian Reservation. He graduated from the Los Angeles High School, then studied art at the Art Students League of Los Angeles. After completing his education in California, Carter studied in New York under Robert Henri. His and Rex Slinkard's works were exhibited at the League in 1910. A critic for the Los Angeles Times stated, "For the present, instructors of the ASL of LA are pupils of Robert Henri of NY - and you know what that means! You know, at once, that they are strictly up-to-date in their artistic ideas, that they are the most modern of the moderns, and that they are smashing academic traditions with every vigorous stroke of charcoal stick or paintbrush."

== Career ==
Carter taught illustration at the Grand Central School of Art in New York City, with N. C. Wyeth and Harvey Dunn. His students included Lawrence Nelson Wilbur and Perle Fine. He also taught at the Chouinard Art Institute in Los Angeles, and was head of the Illustration department.

His illustrations appeared in Life, Good Housekeeping, McCall's , Ladies' Home Journal, The American Magazine, and Woman's Home Companion. He was art director at Atlanta Journal and Good Housekeeping. Carter was an adept illustrator at the magazine publishing industry, including women's magazines, and anticipated and adjusted his approach as the market changed. Initially, Carter made Impressionist works, like that of Walter Biggs. He stated, "The illustrator's first function is a problem of composition, of pattern, of design - including the rich contrast of the illustration itself with the type matter and headlines of the story... the illustrator may be likened to the director of a motion picture...He must live the part of each actor. He must do the scenery, design the costumes, and handle the lighting effects." He had adapted a modern style that focused on decoration and page design by the 1950s. He exhibited his works in California.

In 1988, Carter was inducted into the Society of Illustrators' Hall of Fame.

== Personal life ==
Carter married a woman named Theresa, and about 1920 they had a son named Deal. He and his family lived on the East Coast of the United States until about 1930, when they moved to California. They were living in Studio City, Los Angeles in the mid-1950s. About December 1, 1955, Carter killed his wife and his son, who had been handicapped from birth, while they were sleeping, and then killed himself. Carter had been emotionally upset about selling the family house and an upcoming move to Carrollton, Georgia. His body was found with a .45 revolver in his son's bedroom.
