= Borders of Belgium =

State borders

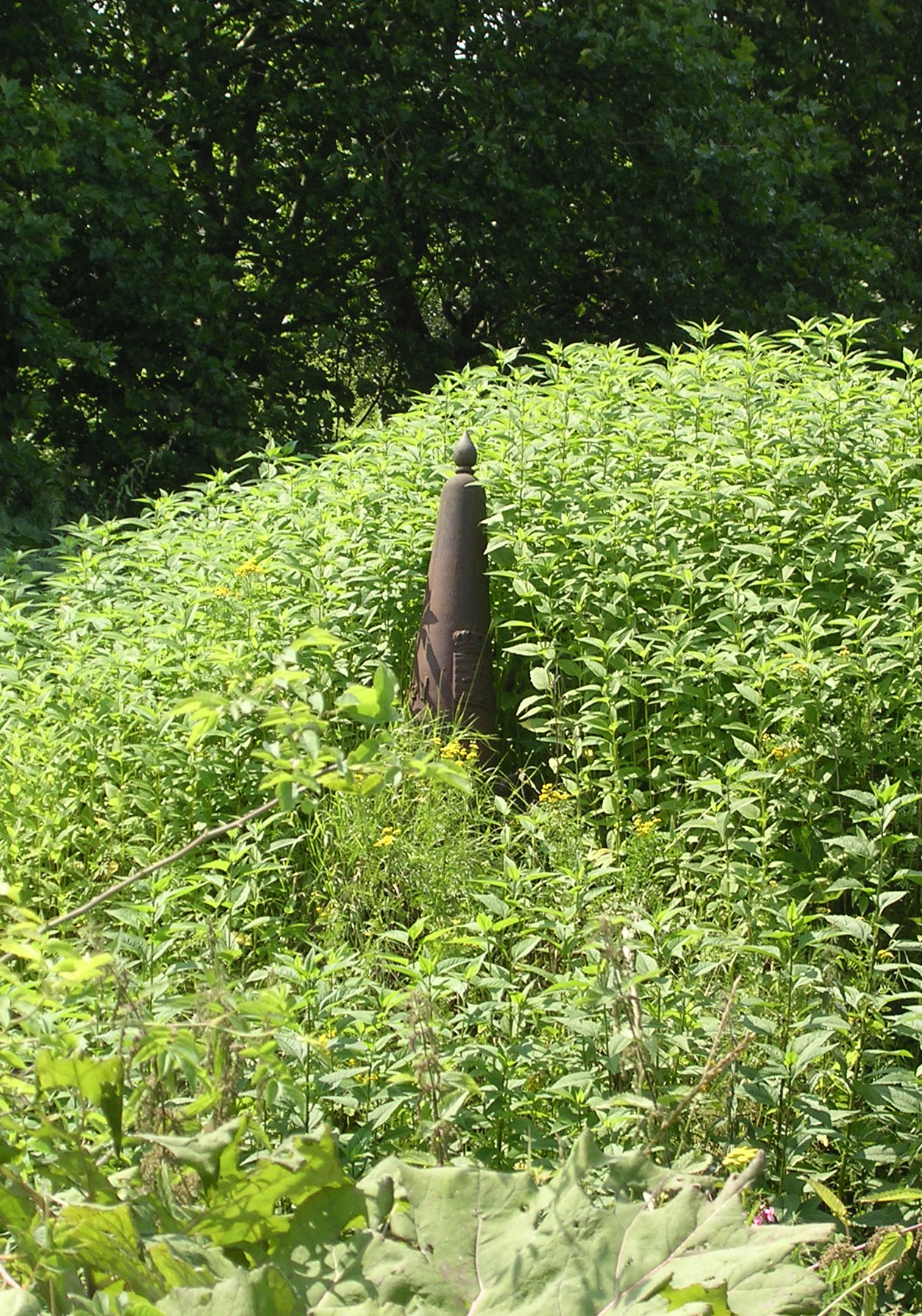
Belgium–France–Luxembourg tripoint

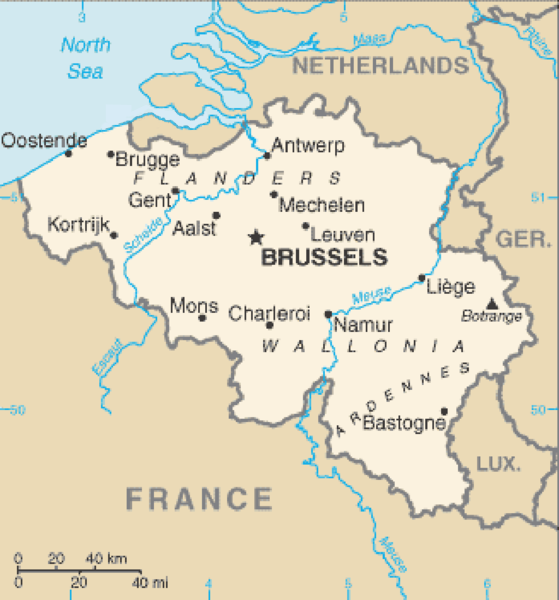
Belgium and her neighbors

Belgium shares borders with France, Germany, Luxembourg and the Netherlands. Belgium became de facto independent from the United Kingdom of the Netherlands in 1830. Its borders were formalized between 1839 and 1843. Over the years there have been various adjustments, notably after the Treaty of Versailles (1919) when some territory was transferred to Luxembourg. There remain enclaves of Germany and the Netherlands within Belgium and enclaves of Belgium within the Netherlands.

== General ==
Belgium obtained de facto independence from the United Kingdom of the Netherlands with the Belgian Revolution in 1830. Its extent was formalized by the Treaty of London (1839). The border between Belgium and the Netherlands was only delimited by the Boundary Treaty signed in the Hague on 5 November 1842, and the Convention of Maastricht of 8 August 1843. The Hague Treaty delimited the border in general terms while the Maastricht Convention delineated the boundary with detailed descriptions and maps on a 1:10,000 or, where necessary, 1:2,500 scale.

== Belgium–France border ==
The limits of the Belgium–France border are outlined in the 1820 Treaty of Kortrijk, agreed between France and the then-United Kingdom of the Netherlands. Belgium inherited the border upon its independence. Maintenance of and disputes concerning the border markers are managed by a mixed Franco-Belgian border delimitation commission, which is convened when required. A commission was convened in 2000 concerning maintenance of the 78 border markers between France and the Belgian province of West Flanders.

On 4 May 2021 a border post was temporarily moved by a Belgian farmer, shifting it approximately 2.29 metres (7 ft 6 in) into France.

== Belgium–Luxembourg border ==
The border between Belgium and Luxembourg is about 148 kilometres (92 mi) long. It runs between the Belgian provinces of Luxembourg and Liège and the Luxembourg regions of Ardennes, Luxembourg City and Red Lands. There are 507 border markers along the S-shaped border.

The Belgium–Luxembourg border was defined in 1839. The French-speaking part of the Grand Duchy of Luxembourg and the Arlon region were allocated to Belgium, while the German speaking part of the Grand Duchy was within the German Confederation. The border was redrawn in 1919 after the Treaty of Versailles, with the French-speaking province being transferred to Luxembourg.

== Belgium–Germany border ==
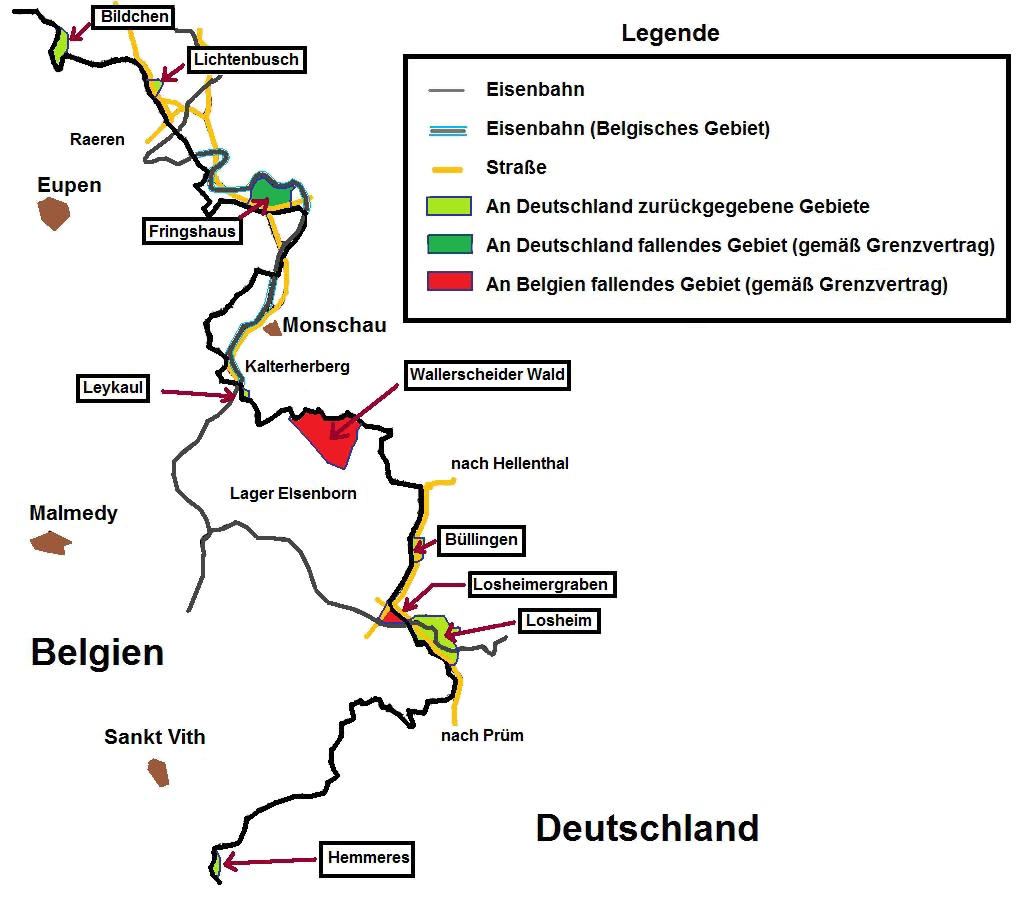
Belgium–Germany border and German enclaves

The border between the modern states of Belgium and Germany has a length of 136 km (85 mi). (Note: When the German enclaves in Belgium are included, the border is 167 kilometres (104 mi) long.) The border runs between the Belgian region of Liege and the German regions of North Rhine-Westphalia and Rhineland-Palatinate. It runs from the Germany-Belgium-Luxembourg tripoint to the Germany-Belgium-Netherlands tripoint. There were many changes to the border demarcation until World War II. After the war ended in 1945, Belgium was given administration of the German territories of Aachen-Bildchen, Losheim and Losheimergraben. The accord of 26 September 1956 returned these towns to Germany.

The Vennbahn was a railway line built in Germany close to the Belgian border. When the areas of Eupen, Malmedy and St. Vith became part of Belgium as a result of the Versailles Treaty, a strip 5 metres (16 ft) wide along the railway line became Belgian territory. Some of the land to the west of the line remained German in five small enclaves. From north to south they are named Munsterbildchen, Rötgener Wald, Rückschlag, Mützenich and Ruitzhof. A sixth German enclave to the south, Hemmeres, was also cut off by a railway line, but it was handed back to Germany in 1956.

== Belgium–Netherlands border ==
A total of 365 border posts were erected to indicate the border between Belgium and the Netherlands after it was agreed in 1843. While the two treaties resulted in the finalisation and demarcation of the main border between the two countries, they left the complicated territorial situation in Baarle unresolved. The current Belgian enclaves as well as Dutch counter-enclaves have resulted in what has been called the world's most complicated international boundary. This is a continuation of land ownership from the feudal age. Several subsequent negotiations failed to resolve the territorial issues here.

== Sources ==
- "Belgian farmer accidentally moves French border", BBC News, 4 May 2021
- Border: Belgium-Germany, Transfrontier Operational Mission (MOT)
- Border: Belgium-Luxembourg, Transfrontier Operational Mission (MOT)
- "Die Bahn blieb belgisch", Der Zug kommt (in German)
- Jan S. Krogh, Vennbahn (German exclaves in Belgium)
- Kaid Benfield (17 February 2012), "The Most Complicated Border Town in the World", CityLab, Bloomberg L.P.
- Länge der Grenzen von Deutschland zu Nachbarstaaten, Stand: 2017, Statistisches Bundesamt
- "Question nº 309 de M. Vandenbroeke du 21 décembre 1999", Questions et Réponses, Sénat de Belgique
- Randall Lesaffer (22 February 2016), "Demarcating sovereignty: A history of Dutch-Belgian land swaps", OUPBlog, Oxford University Press
