= Hideo Date =

Japanese-American painter (1907–2005)

- Born: January 5, 1907; Osaka, Japan
- Died: January 6, 2005 (aged 98); Queens, New York
- Education: Kawabata Gakko, Tokyo; Otis Art Institute, Los Angeles
- Known for: Painting
- Movement: Synchromism
- Spouse: Yuriko Tamaki

Hideo Date (Japanese: 伊達 秀雄, January 5, 1907 – January 6, 2005) was a Japanese-born American painter active from the 1930s to the 1980s, known for combining elements of Japanese nihonga with American Synchromism. A prominent figure in the Los Angeles art scene prior to World War II, his career was interrupted by the wartime incarceration of Japanese Americans. Although he continued painting for decades after the war, Date's work remained largely ignored until he was rediscovered by a younger generation of artists and curators in the 1990s.

== Early life ==
Date was born in Osaka, Japan, and his father left for California in search of work shortly thereafter. Date's mother and brothers later joined his father to help in the hardware store he had established in Fresno, and in 1923, a sixteen-year-old Date immigrated to California as well. After his father was forced to file for bankruptcy and close the hardware store in 1925, the family moved to Los Angeles, where Date graduated from Polytechnic High School. In 1928, he enrolled at the Otis Art Institute, but he left the next year over an argument with the Institute's director, who had urged him to stop painting "in an Oriental manner." His parting words were: "If you don't like my painting, you can go to hell." Date studied traditional Japanese painting at the Kawabata Gakko in Tokyo for two years, returning to Los Angeles in 1930.

Over the next several years, Date became active in the local arts community and began exhibiting his work, helping his two brothers at their flower shop during the day and attending art classes at night. He was a member of the Independents, a group of Los Angeles area artists who rejected the tenets of modernism, and worked closely with Synchromism co-founder Stanton Macdonald-Wright and others in the avant-garde movement. Date showed paintings in exhibitions of the Japanese Artists of Los Angeles, Young Painters at the College Art Association, Foundation of Western Art, the Los Angeles Oriental Artists Group, and the Los Angeles Art Association. He received a commission to paint a mural in Pickfair, the mansion home of Mary Pickford, and later Macdonald-Wright, then heading the Southern California Works Progress Administration's Federal Arts Project, arranged for Date to paint another at a school in the Japanese American community of Terminal Island. Date was at work on the second mural at the time of the attack on Pearl Harbor and Executive Order 9066; it remained unfinished when he was sent to camp in 1942 and has since disappeared.

== World War II and later career ==
During World War II, he was "evacuated" from the West Coast with other Japanese Americans, first to the Santa Anita Assembly Center in California and then to the Heart Mountain concentration camp in Wyoming. While at Heart Mountain, Date and fellow inmate Benji Okubo formed the Art Students League school and taught art classes in camp. At its peak the school had 250 students and teachers, who showcased their work in several exhibitions and created a mural at the camp. Date himself continued drawing and painting in camp, although he almost exclusively created pictures of cats.

Date was released from Heart Mountain in 1945, to work on a mural in Buffalo, New York. He returned to Los Angeles briefly in 1947, to retrieve his pre-war artwork and hold a show at the Art Center School, but otherwise remained based in New York for the rest of his life. He married Yuriko Tamaki, and in 1955, after the Walter-McCarran Act struck down race-based restrictions on naturalization, he became a U.S. citizen. Although Date continued working, his career never fully recovered from the interruption caused by his wartime confinement. He participated in a few exhibitions in the 1950s, but did not show any work again until 1977. In the late 1990s, Date donated almost 200 works to the Japanese American National Museum in Los Angeles. Two other area museums showcased his work in 2000, and in 2001 the JANM retrospective, "In Living Color: The Art of Hideo Date," opened to the public. The JANM exhibit's curator, Karin Higa, published an accompanying book on Date and his work under the same title.

Date died at his home in Queens one day after his ninety-eighth birthday, in 2005.
