= Guaranty Building (Hollywood, California) =

Scientology building in Los Angeles

- U.S. National Register of Historic Places
- U.S. Historic district – Contributing property
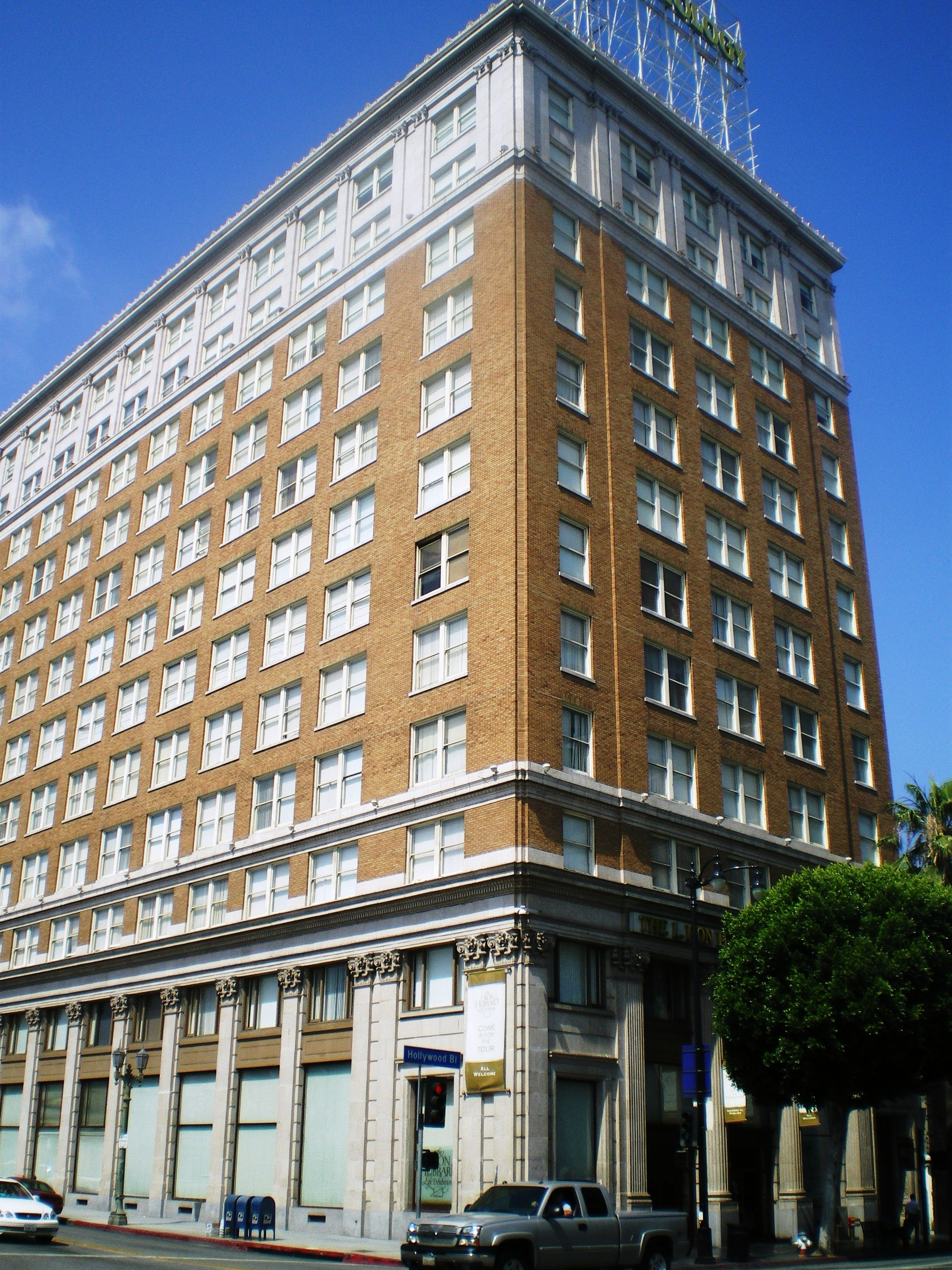
- Guaranty Building, 2008

- Location within the Los Angeles metropolitan area
- Location: 6331 Hollywood Blvd., Hollywood, California
- Coordinates: 34°6′6.87″N 118°19′40.36″W
- Built: 1923
- Architect: John C. Austin, Frederic M. Ashley
- Architectural style: Beaux Arts
- Part of: Hollywood Boulevard Commercial and Entertainment District (ID85000704)
- NRHP reference No.: 79000481

Significant dates
- Designated NRHP: September 4, 1979
- Designated CP: April 4, 1985

Guaranty Building, also known as Guaranty Building and Loan Association, Hollywood Guaranty Building, Allstate Title Building, and L. Ron Hubbard Life Exhibition Building, is a historic high-rise Beaux Arts office building located at 6331 Hollywood Boulevard in Hollywood, Los Angeles, California. It is currently owned by the Church of Scientology.

== History ==
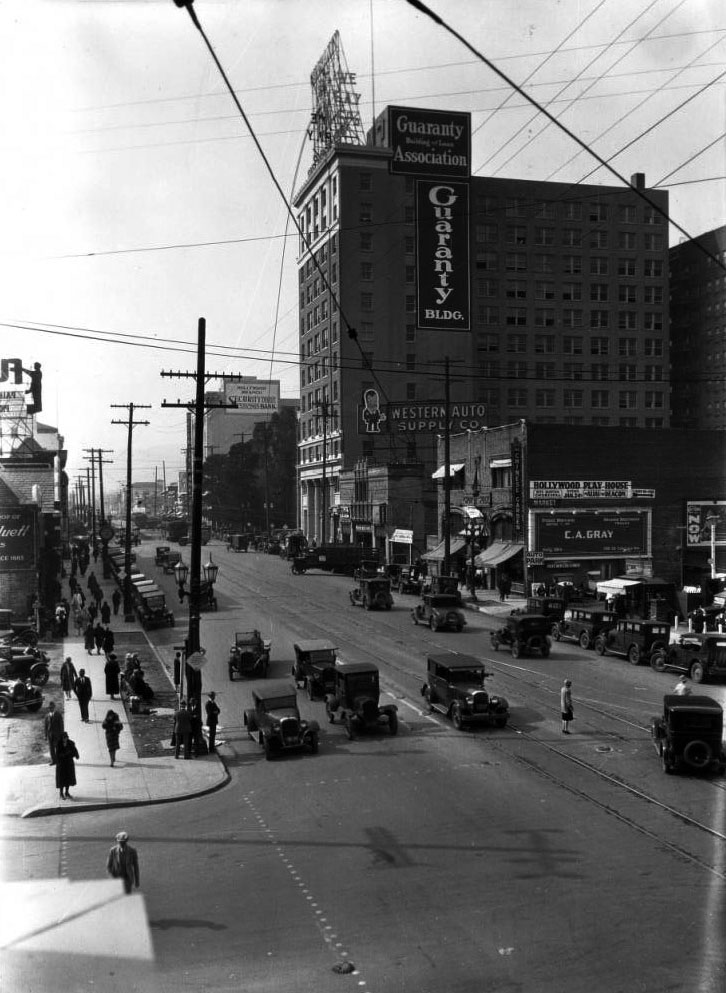
The building in 1923

Hollywood's Guaranty Building was built in 1923 by the Guaranty Building and Loan Association of Los Angeles by direction of its secretary and general manager Gilbert Beesemyer, (Note: According to Time magazine in 1931 and 1938, secretary and general manager Gilbert H. Beesemyer had embezzled eight million dollars from the company, for which he went to San Quentin Prison for 44 years.) with Charlie Chaplin and Cecil B. DeMille included as investors. The building features Beaux-Arts architecture and was designed by John C. Austin and Frederic M. Ashley, the duo also responsible for Griffith Observatory and Memorial Branch Library. Upon completion, the building was appraised for $1,325,000 ($25 million in 2025) and over the years, its tenants have included Charlie Chaplin, Cecil B. Demille, Hedda Hopper, Al Jolson, Rudolph Valentino, and others.

The building was hit hard by the Great Depression, with its owner Guaranty Building and Loan Association of Los Angeles declaring bankruptcy in 1930, an event that had ripple effects throughout Hollywood. Allstate Title Company moved into the location the following year and aided in the area's recovery.

In 1979, the building was included in the National Register of Historic Places, and in 1985, the Hollywood Boulevard Commercial and Entertainment District was added to the register, with the Guaranty Building listed as a contributing property in the district.

=== Scientology ===
In 1988, the Church of Scientology purchased the building for $5.1 million ($13.9 million in 2025), to be used as management organizations for the Scientology network of corporations. It is the official corporate office for Church of Scientology International and Religious Technology Center. On the ground floor is the L. Ron Hubbard Life Exhibition. The building includes offices for David Miscavige, the President of the Church of Scientology (when Heber Jentzsch held that post), and the Office of Special Affairs among other departments. It houses most of the organization's upper and middle management offices. Within Scientology, the building is called the Hollywood Guaranty Building or the HGB for short.

In 2026, the Guaranty Building and several other nearby Scientology properties were the location of speedrunning pranks.

== Architecture and design ==
The Guaranty Building is twelve stories in height, rectangular in plan, and made of reinforced concrete. It features a Beaux Arts design that includes Neo-Renaissance and Classical Revival characteristics, with the design divided into three horizontal sections, the top and bottom sections mirroring each other. These sections are sheathed in terra cotta and grey granite, while the middle section is faced with light colored brick. Brass and bronze metalwork also feature throughout the exterior of the building.

The bottom section consists of the first three floors, the first and second tied together by two massive Corinthian engaged columns inside a recessed entrance bay that is flanked by rectangular piers on block bases topped with modified Corinthian capitals. An egg-and-dart design adds decoration around the doors and on the second story molding, while a classic cornice serves as a stringcourse at the top of the third story.

The middle section consists of the fourth through tenth floors and features a central bay set against slightly recessed side bays. Single, double-hung sash windows break the wall surface of the side bays, while paired, double-hung sash windows articulate the central bay. The top section consists of the eleventh and twelfth floors, with stone columns topped with capital ornamentation connecting them. A heavy cornice finishes the design at the roofline. The building's side elevation is designed with the same divisions as the facade, but features engaged piers instead of columns.

Inside, the lobby features marble floors and walls, and the elevator doors are brass with a textured quilted pattern.

== See also ==
- List of contributing properties in the Hollywood Boulevard Commercial and Entertainment District
