= George Stanley (sculptor) =

American sculptor (1903–1970)

- Stanley, in 1959, with the statuette he sculpted
- Born: George Maitland Stanley; April 23, 1903; Iota, Louisiana
- Died: May 11, 1970 (aged 67)
- Education: Otis Art Institute
- Known for: sculpture

George Maitland Stanley (April 26, 1903 – May 11, 1970) was an American sculptor. Well known for sculpting the Muse Statue at the Hollywood Bowl. Cedric Gibbons designed the Oscar statuette in 1928, but tasked the sculpting to Stanley.

== Early life ==
Stanley was born in Iota, Acadia Parish, Louisiana in the year 1903. He then moved as a child to California and spent his youth there in the city of Watsonville. Upon graduation from high school Stanley proceeded to study sculpture at Otis Art Institute in Los Angeles from 1923 to 1926. He also taught at this school from 1926 to 1942. Stanley also taught briefly at the Santa Barbara School of the Arts. During his life he completed many public arts works including work for schools such as the Long Beach Polytechnic High School, as well as works for private patrons.

== Sculpting career ==
The Oscar statuette was fabricated based upon a sketch by MGM art director Cedric Gibbons in 1927. It was first awarded in 1929. Since then, more than 3000 statuettes have been presented to some of the world's best film and television actors, writers, directors, producers, and technicians.

Stanley sculpted a statue of Sir Isaac Newton located at the Griffith Observatory, completed in 1934. This statue was part of a larger work known as the Astronomer's Monument. This work was a public project funded by the PWAP. Consequently, the work was signed "PWAP", with none of the six artists contributing to it receiving individual recognition. The design for the monument was submitted by Archibald Garner, and executed by him and five of the other sculptors who had submitted proposals.

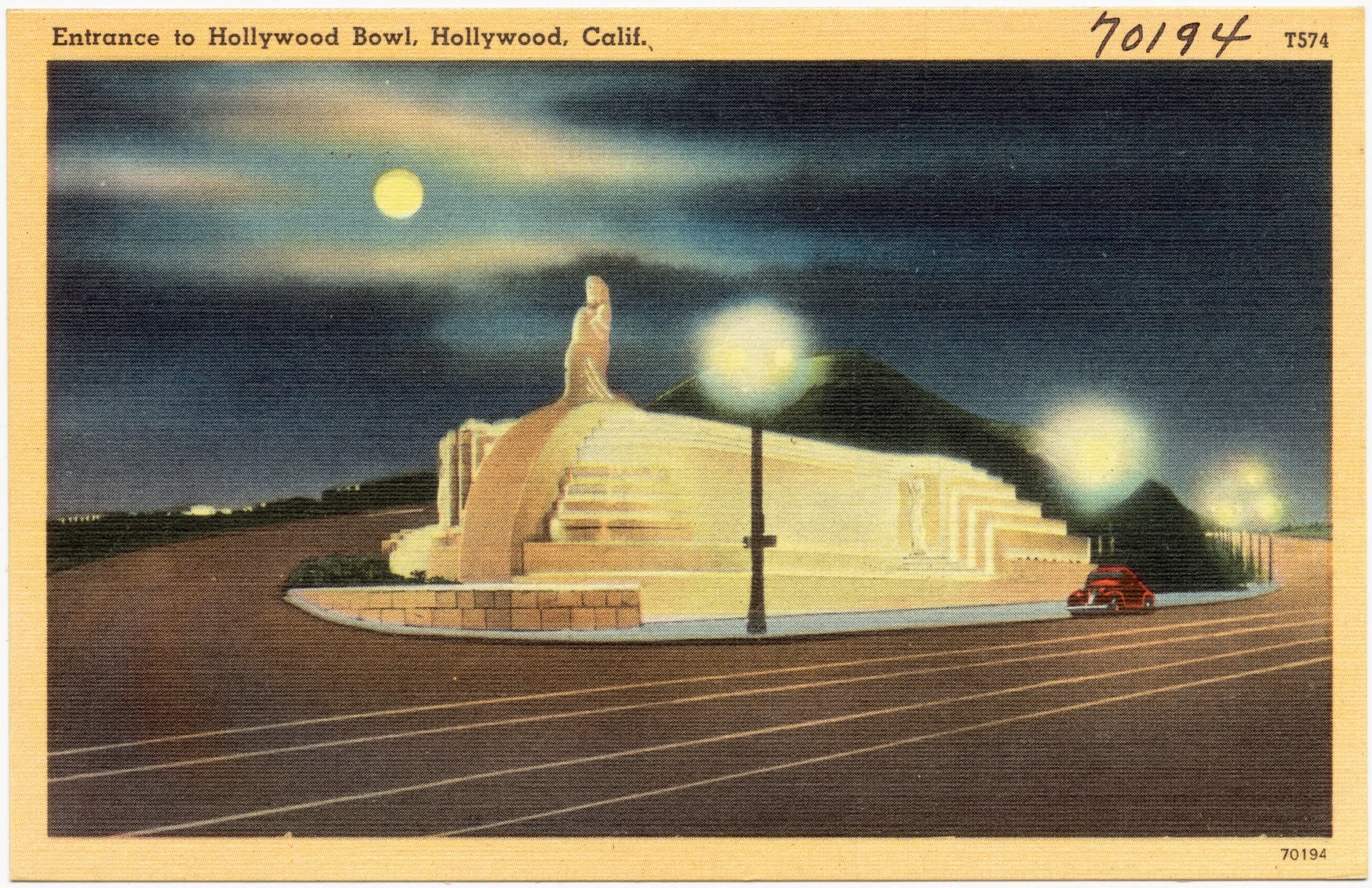
Hollywood’s muse

Stanley sculpted the Muse of Music, Dance, Drama located at the Hollywood Bowl which serves as the gateway to Hollywood. Completed in 1940, this fountain sculpture in the Streamline Moderne style is carved from granite and stands twenty-two feet tall and two-hundred feet wide. It serves as a retaining wall for the amphitheater. In June 2006, the sculpture was refurbished and rededicated. It received new plumbing, landscaping and grout.

The stylized relief above the Art Deco landmark Bullocks Wilshire entrance at 3050 Wilshire Boulevard was designed by George Stanley.

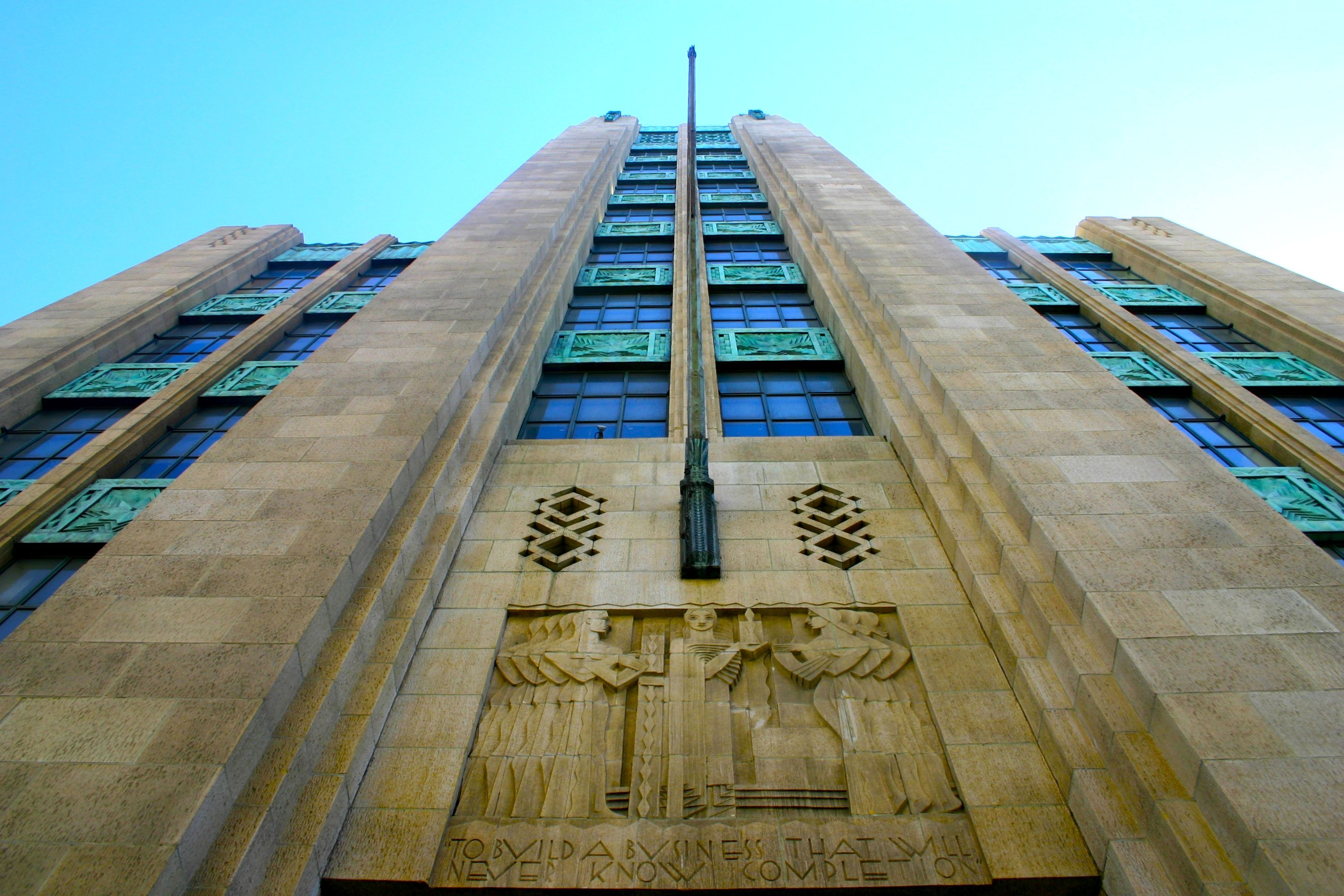
Bullocks Wilshire relief
