= Fremont Hotel =

Fremont Hotel may refer to:

- Fremont Hotel and Casino, a hotel and casino in Las Vegas, Nevada
- Fremont Hotel, Los Angeles, a hotel in Los Angeles, California
