= Scott Liggett =

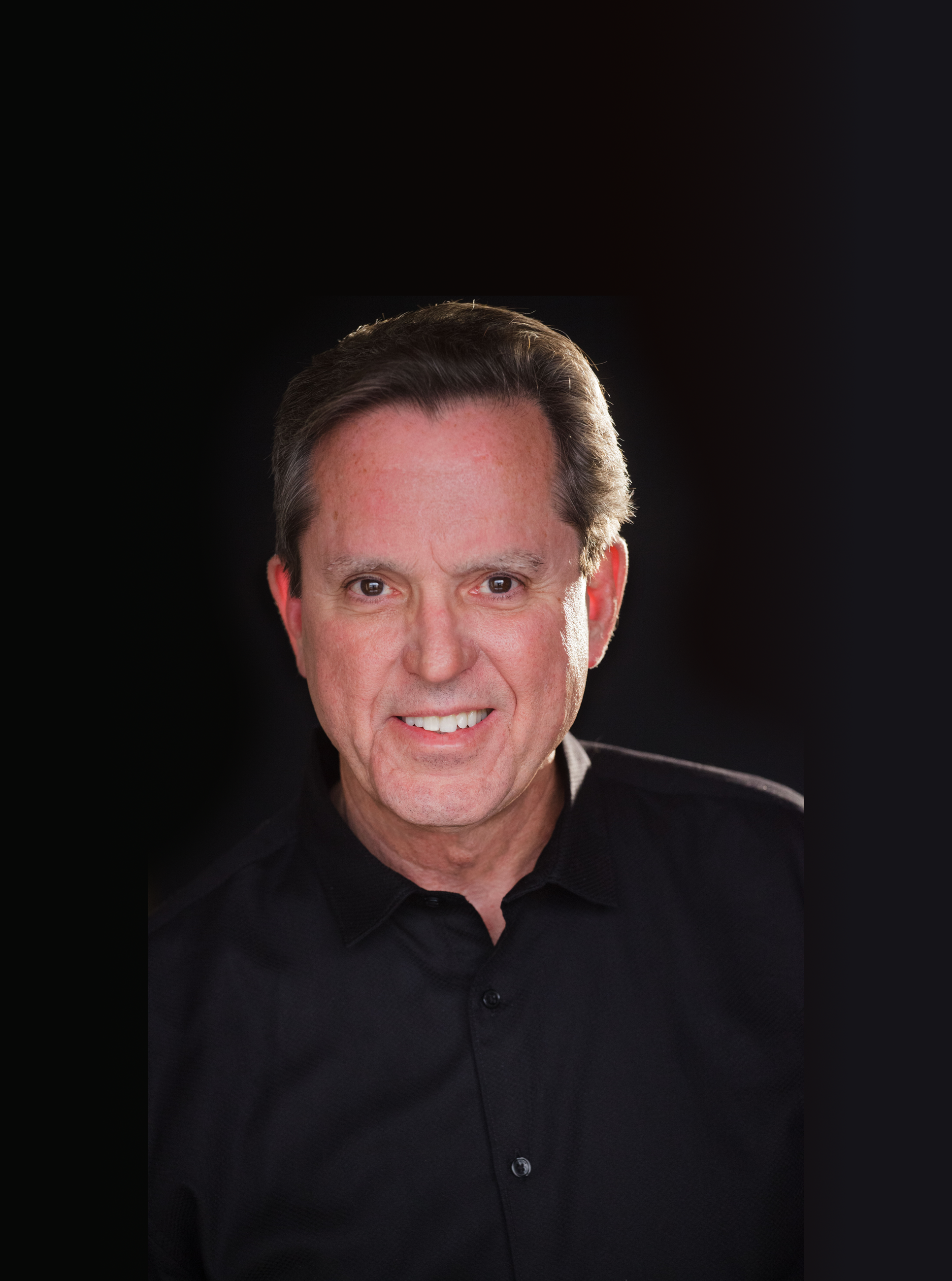
- Citizenship: American
- Education: University of the Pacific
- Occupations: Music producer, composer
- Known for: Centered in the Universe, Signs of Life (Griffith Observatory Exhibits)

Scott Liggett is an American audio producer, composer, and arranger. He was awarded the Sports Emmy Award in 1996 for his contributions to ESPN's NCAA Men's Basketball Championship. In 2021, Liggett received the Hollywood Music in Media Award for Best Original Score for his work on the planetarium show Signs of Life.

Since 2020, Liggett has served as a member of the Board of Regents at the University of the Pacific.

== Background ==
Liggett studied popular music and classical music at the Conservatory of Music at the University of the Pacific in Stockton, California. In the early 1970s, he began his career as a rhythm guitarist with the Stuart Little Band, which became the house band at the Great American Music Hall. During this time, he also played guitar as a staff musician in casino orchestras in Lake Tahoe and Reno, performing alongside notable artists such as Frank Sinatra, Sammy Davis Jr., David Bowie, and Sarah Vaughan.

After a few years, Liggett left the casino bands and relocated to Las Vegas, where he ran a live stage production company that produced revues for casinos and staged industrial shows. Eventually, he sold his share to his partner and moved to Los Angeles.

In the 80s, Liggett worked on a pastiche of TV shows, promos and spots as a freelance music composer and producer in Hollywood, and in the late 89s, he met the jazz musician and composer Alan Ett, and in 1991, Liggett and Ett co-founded the Alan Ett Music Group, a combination music house and audio recording and post facility located in Studio City, California. In 1995, he was hired by Wieden+Kennedy, where he composed and arranged the band tracks performed by Robert Goulet for ESPN campaigns, including the 1995 NCAA basketball campaign and the 1996 Vince Lombardi football campaign.

In 1997, Liggett co-founded Media City Sound, headquartered in Studio City, California. In 2013, he co-founded LNL Partners, a cinematic graphic novel company, in collaboration with Disney digital artist and editor Gary Laird, and comics publisher Mariano Nicieza. LNL Partners produced several projects for Stan Lee and William Shatner.

Liggett composed and produced the music for several planetarium shows at the Griffith Observatory, including Centered in the Universe and Signs of Life.

In 2020, Liggett was elected to the Board of Regents at the University of the Pacific.

== Awards and recognition ==
In 1996, Liggett received the National Sports Emmy Award for his work on ESPN's NCAA Men's Basketball Championship. In 2021, he was honored with the Distinguished Alumni Award from the University of the Pacific. The following year, Liggett received at the Hollywood Music in Media Award for Best Original Score for his work on the Signs of Life Griffith Observatory Planetarium Show.

== Discography ==
Notable works that Liggett composed the music for include:

- 2001: Card Sharks
- 2002: The Chair
- 2006: I've Got a Secret
- 2006: Centered in the Universe
