= Thomas Pascoe =

British hotelier (1847–1938)

- Born: Thomas Pascoe; 10 March 1847; Cornwall, England
- Died: 17 February 1938 (aged 90); Los Angeles, California, US
- Spouse: Jane Retallick
- Children: 2

Thomas Pascoe (1847–1938) was an Englishman who initially worked in the Royal Navy for seven years and also witnessed the opening of the Suez canal. After he left the naval service, he migrated to the United States, where he became a hotel developer and proprietor in California.

== Early years ==
According to J.M. Guinn's biography, Pascoe was born 10 March 1847 to George and Isabelle Pascoe in Cornwall, where he spent his childhood. Other sources suggest a birth date of 1853. His service career started as a steward in the Royal Navy. He rose to the rank of chief steward and served for seven years as the head of his department in the naval ship "the man-of-war." During his naval career, he visited the Irish coast and the Mediterranean. In 1870, in his naval ship "the man-of-war", he visited Naples, and then Athens. In November 1869, he witnessed the opening of the Suez Canal by Napoleon III. After seven years of service in the Royal Navy he returned to England and started working on his own.

== Career ==
Pascoe and his brother, George, migrated to United States. He was then 25 years old. They initially lived in New York City and then moved to Montana. There they joined the United States Marshals Service and served as deputy United States marshals. They were assigned to work at the penitentiary at Deer Lodge. They resigned from this position and started rearing sheep. In 1875, Pascoe ventured on his own and at Colorado Springs, he opened the Pascoe Hotel and Restaurant. He ran this hotel and restaurant for several years. In 1881, he moved to Ukiah, California, purchased the Grand Hotel and ran it for a year. He then sold his interests in Ukiah and moved to Pleasanton, California, and leased the Rose Hotel, which he operated for a year and a half.

Pascoe, along with his brother, finally shifted to Los Angeles. Initially, for four months, he was in charge of the Kimball mansion. He then opened his own hotel establishment called the Clifton House, which was located at the corner of Temple and Fort streets. This was a family hotel built by him on modern lines which was the first of its kind in the city. Three years later managing, he bought the Lincoln Hotel, which was located at Second and Hill streets. After refurbishing the hotel he managed the hotel for thirteen years. He then sold it and established the Fremont Hotel Company.

The Fremont Hotel, located in the Bunker Hill suburb, was built and designed by the architect John C. Austin and developed by Thomas Pascoe. The plans for building the hotel were developed in November 1901 and initially faced resistance from the next door Olive Street School establishment. It was designed by the architect in the Mission style, and had some 100 rooms. It opened on 9 September 1902 and was named after John C. Frémont. When newly built, it was billed as "the newest and most elegantly appointed family hotel in Los Angeles." On 21 January 1903, the hotel was the venue of a banquet organised in honour of John Fremont, the builder of Los Angeles from the arid desert lands. In 1912, he sold the lease of this hotel, along with its furniture. He then undertook a voyage in Europe for a year and a half.

== Personal life ==
He was a director of the Los Angeles Chamber of Commerce and also a member of the police commission. He served as president of the Southern California Hotel Association. Fraternally, he was a Mason. His social identity was with the Society of California Pioneers. Politically, he was a Republican. He was also president of the board of trustees of the First Unitarian Church of Los Angeles. Pascoe married Jane Retallick (1846–1938) in Colorado Springs in August 1877. They had two sons, Arthur Thomas Pascoe, who may have died young, and Elmer Rose Pascoe, who became a physician.
