= Beckett Residence =

Mansion in Los Angeles, California, United States

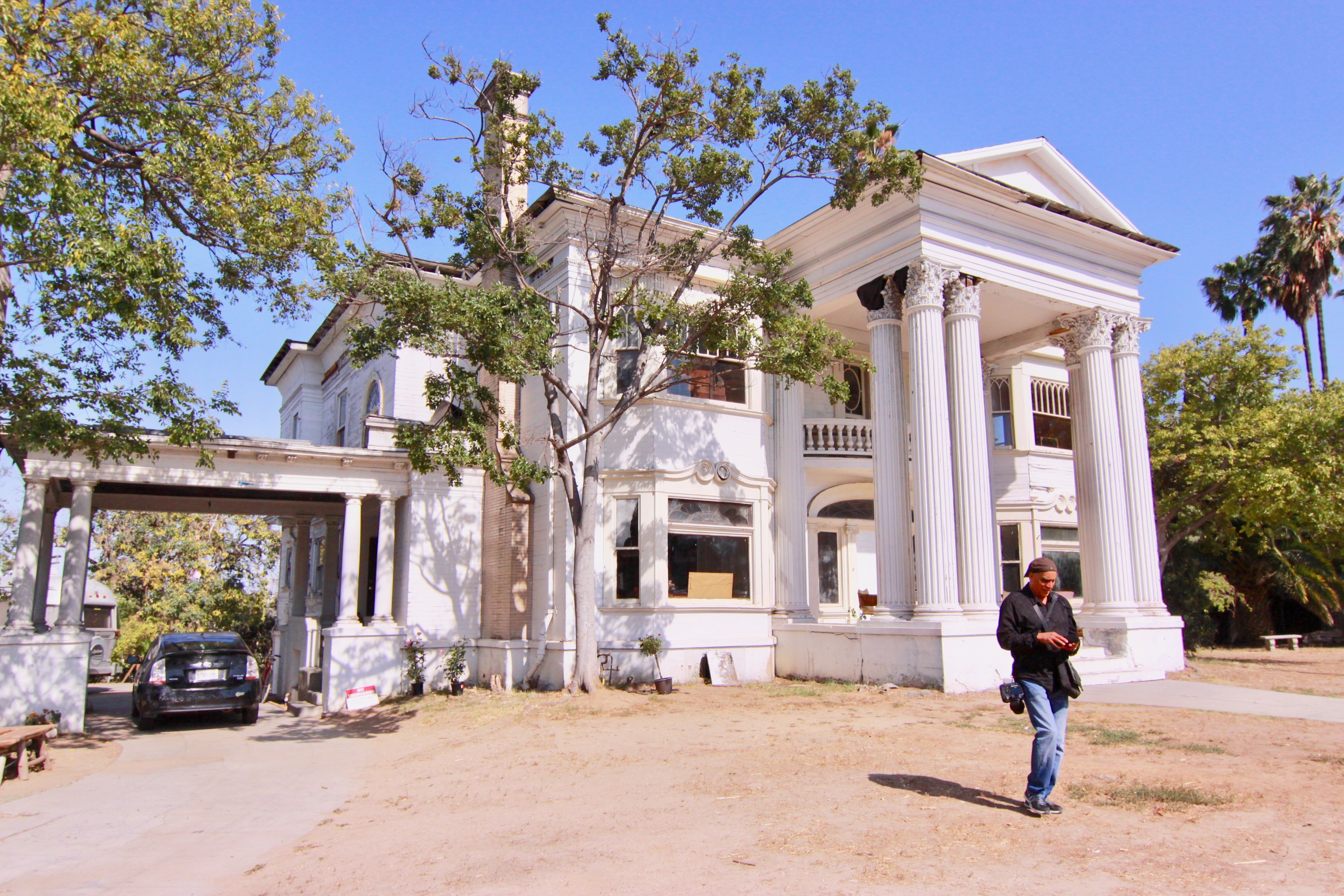
The Neoclassical facade of the Beckett Residence

The Beckett Residence, also known as the Beckett Mansion, is a historic Neoclassical-style manor located at 2218 South Harvard Boulevard in the West Adams Heights neighborhood of Los Angeles, California. Built in 1905, it was designed by the prolific architect John C. Austin for Dr. Wesley W. Beckett. The residence was designated a Los Angeles Historic-Cultural Monument (HCM #117) on June 13, 1973.

== History ==
=== Early ownership and construction ===
The mansion was commissioned in 1905 by Dr. Wesley Wilbur Beckett (1857-1936), a prominent figure in the early 20th century Los Angeles medical community. Dr. Beckett served as a Medical Director for the Pacific Mutual Life Insurance Company, a member of the Board of Trustees for the University of Southern California (USC), and president of the Los Angeles County Medical Association.

The house was designed by John C. Austin, an architect responsible for several of Los Angeles' most recognizable landmarks, including Los Angeles City Hall, the Griffith Observatory, and the Shrine Auditorium. The Beckett Residence is considered a significant early example of Austin's residential work, showcasing the Neoclassical style tat would later influence his civic designs.

=== Later years and filming ===
By the late 20th Century, the property had fallen into a state of disrepair. During its period of vacancy and neglect, it became a popular location for the film and television industry, particularly for productions requiring a "haunted" or "dilapidated" aesthetic.

In 2012, the mansion gained wider cultural attention as the site of Delusion: The Blood Rite, an acclaimed interactive "haunted house" play produced by Jon Braver and Neil Patrick Harris. The Immersive Production utilized the mansion's entire interior and grounds, drawing thousands of visitors and highlighting the building's architectural drama.

== Architecture ==
The Beckett Residence is a two-story Neoclassical structure characterized by its symmetrical facade and monumental scale. Key architectural features include:

The Portico: A prominent central portico supported by large Corinthian columns

Layout: The 12,000 square feet interior originally featured six bedrooms, four bathrooms, and grand social spaces with high ceilings and intricate wood detailing.

Exterior: The facade includes balanced fenestration and decorative pediments consistent with the Beaux-Arts influences of early 1900s.

== Restoration and sustainability ==
In 2013, the property was listed for sale alongside its neighboring lot for approximately $2.45 million. Following years of instability, the mansion was acquired with the intent of a full historic restoration.

In 2023, the restoration project led by the firm Sugar Hill Mansions garnered significant media attention for its innovative use of hempcrete. This marks one of the first instances of a major Los Angeles Historic Cultural Monument being retrofitted with carbon sequestering, sustainable building materials. The project aims to preserve the historic exterior while modernizing the building's insulation and environmental footprint.

== See also ==
- List of Los Angeles Historic-Cultural Monuments in South Los Angeles
- West Adams, Los Angeles
- John C. Austin
