= Laura Danly =

American astronomer

Laura Danly (born July 7, 1958) is an American astronomer and academic who served as Curator of the Griffith Observatory in Los Angeles. She has also served as chair of the Department of Space Sciences at the Denver Museum of Nature & Science.

== Education ==
Danly earned a B.A. in Physics from Yale University, and a Ph.D. in Astronomy from the University of Wisconsin–Madison.

== Career ==
Danly has held academic posts at the University of Denver (where she served as assistant professor), and at Pomona College (where she served as visiting assistant professor). In these positions, she developed curricula focusing on astronomy, archaeoastronomy, solar physics, astrophotography and astrobiology.

Danly spent several years at the Space Telescope Science Institute in Baltimore, Maryland, where she held a variety of positions including project scientist for education, assistant astronomer and Hubble Fellow. In addition, Danly conducted post-doctoral research at the STScI.

As an astronomer, Danly has extensive observational experience, including some 441 hours of ultraviolet observation (much of it via the Hubble Space Telescope). Danly has also completed hundreds of hours of optical and radio observation at such facilities as Kitt Peak National Observatory, McDonald Observatory, Cerro Tololo Inter-American Observatory and the National Radio Astronomy Observatory.

In 1991, Danly founded the Women's Science Forum to encourage young women to pursue careers in science by providing opportunities to meet and ask questions of leading women scientists and engineers and take part in hands-on activities to explore opportunities in various career disciplines. In 1993, Danly co-authored The Baltimore Charter for Women in Astronomy to address the concerns of women as a minority group in the field of astronomy.

Danly has also been a guest scientist on the documentary series The Universe in several episodes and on How the Universe Works.

On October 21, 2009 Danly hosted a lecture on the latest science from the Cassini–Huygens mission to Saturn, where she introduced key scientists involved in the space probe.

Danly retired as Curator of the Griffith Observatory in Los Angeles on December 4, 2020. She is now retired from the field, but is still an active science communicator on her Twitter.
