= Archibald Garner =

American sculptor (1904–1969)

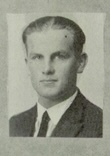
- Archie Garner, Long Beach Polytechnic yearbook (1922)
- Born: February 21, 1904
- Died: May 7, 1969 (aged 65)

Lorraine Archibald “Archie” Garner (February 21, 1904 – May 7, 1969) was an American sculptor.

During the New Deal he was commissioned by the Public Works of Art Project and Treasury Section of Painting and Sculpture to create several notable works of art for public buildings, all within the state of California.

- Astronomers Monument at Griffith Observatory, commissioned by the Public Works of Art Project (PWAP), was Garner's design, and he was one of the six contributing sculptors. The monument honoring Hipparchus, Copernicus, Galileo, Kepler, Newton, and Herschel, was dedicated in November 25, 1934. A casting of the face of Garner’s Copernicus is at the Clark Library.
- Law at the Spring Street Courthouse (formerly a federal courthouse, now superior court) in downtown Los Angeles is an 8 ft (2.4 m) tall limestone sculpture. Law, or The Law, was originally produced under the auspices of PWAP.
- Justice is a 10 ft (3.0 m) tall cast-concrete relief sculpture at the 1939 main post office and courthouse (later downtown station post office, now Fresno Unified School District headquarters) on Tulare Street in Fresno.
- Garner designed and carved the mahogany relief depicting the history of Centinela Springs for the Inglewood, California, post office.

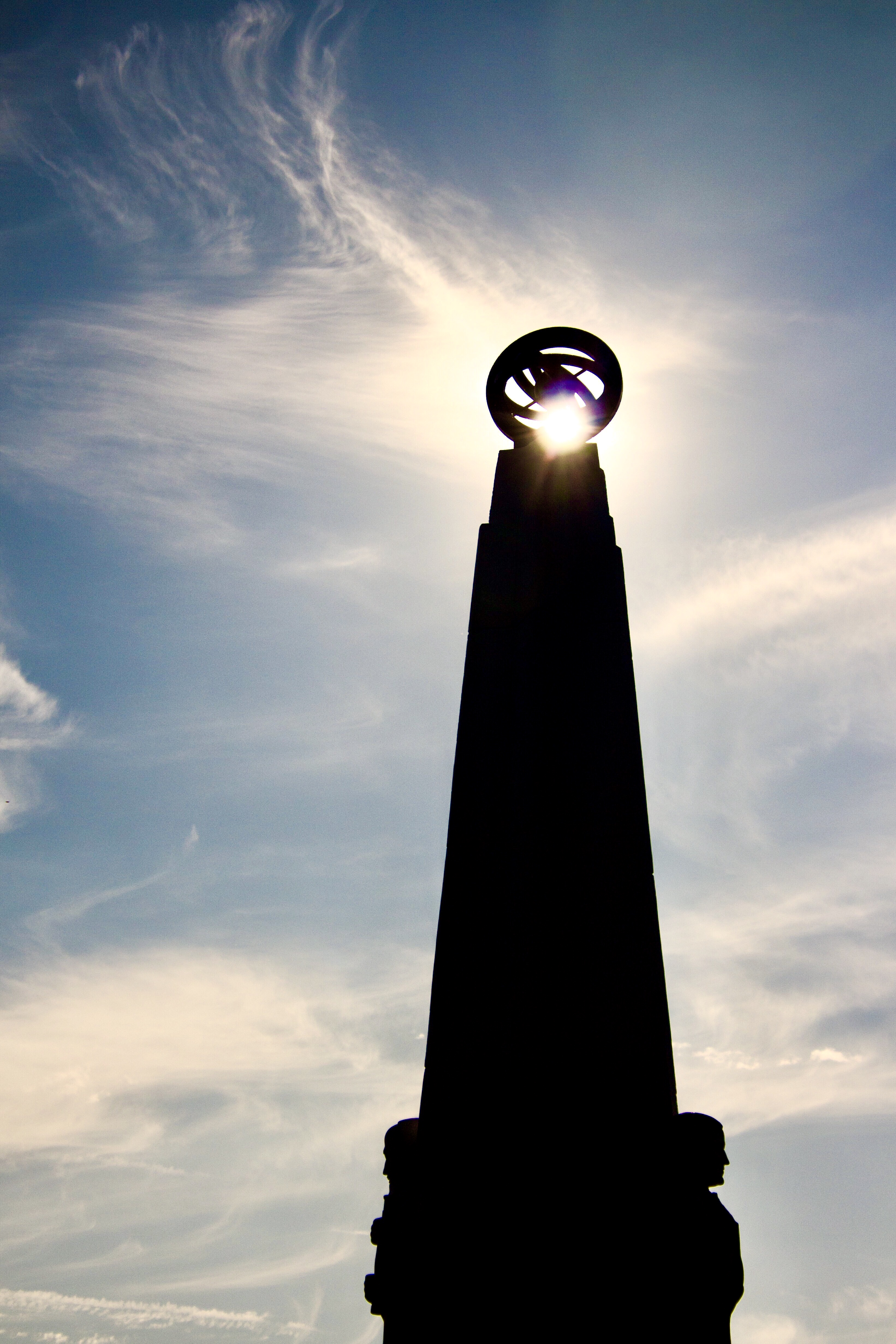
Armillary sphere atop Astronomers Monument by Archibald Garner and company, Griffith Park, Los Angeles

- The Transportation of the Mail reliefs for the downtown San Diego post office building are the only federally funded New Deal sculpture in that city. The terra cotta reliefs depict “a train, a ship, an airplane, and a car, are placed over the windows at the front entrance. An inscription placed in the frieze carried by the pilasters of the front elevation reads, ‘Through science and the toil of patient men, the nation's thoughts traverse the land, sea, and air.’”

Garner, who was born in either Onida, South Dakota, or Fresno, California, also helped design the original Dennis the Menace Playground, did set design work for movie studios, and taught at Monterey Peninsula College and Occidental College.
