= Memorial Branch =

- Memorial Branch Library, Los Angeles
- U.S. National Register of Historic Places
- Los Angeles Historic-Cultural Monument
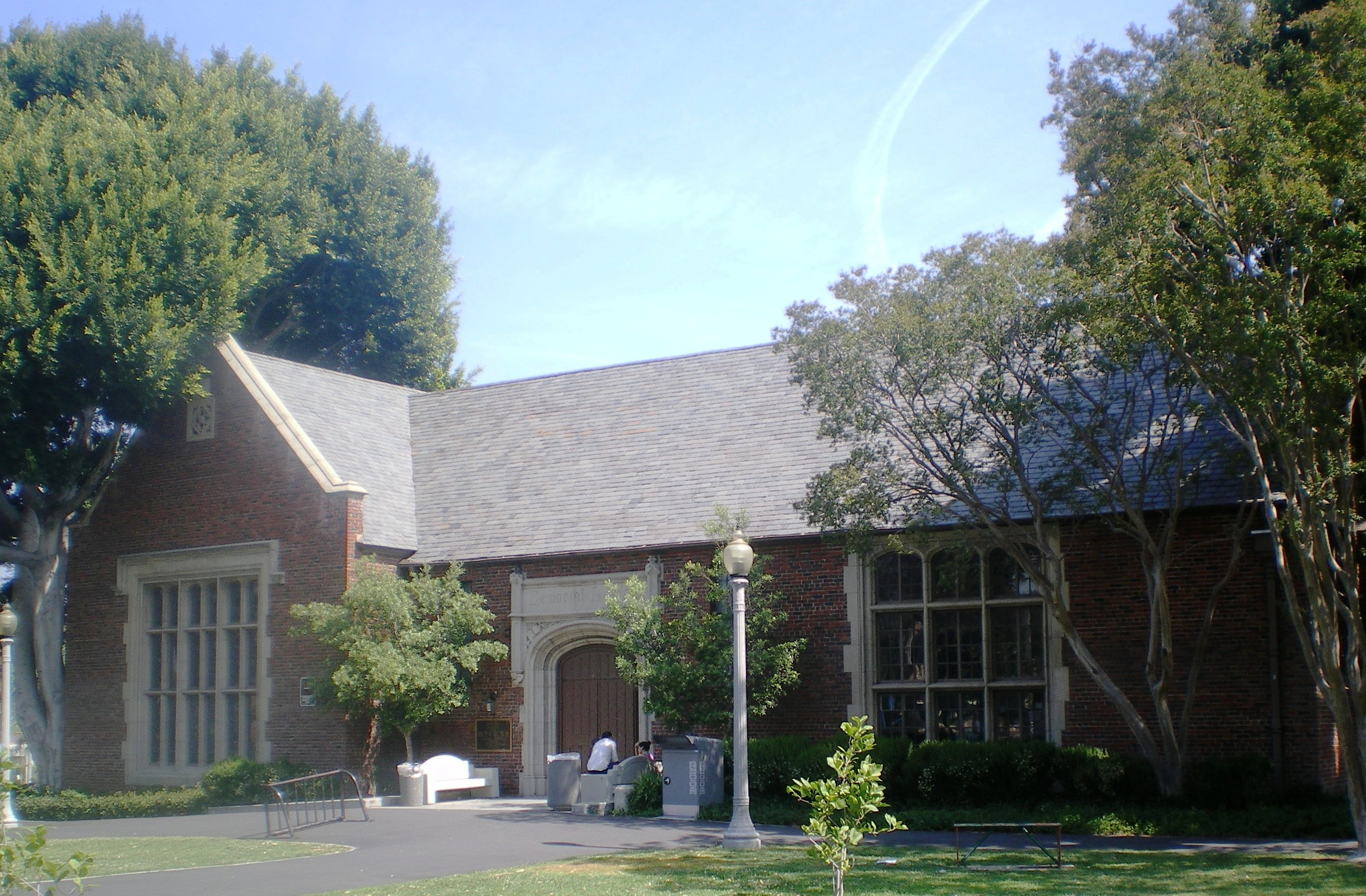
- Memorial Branch, 2008

- Location within the Los Angeles metropolitan area Location within California Location within the United States
- Location: 4645 W. Olympic Blvd., Los Angeles, California
- Coordinates: 34°3′23″N 118°19′56″W
- Built: 1930
- Architect: John C. Austin, Frederic M. Ashley
- Architectural style: Gothic Revival
- MPS: Los Angeles Branch Library System
- NRHP reference No.: 87001015
- LAHCM No.: 81

Significant dates
- Added to NRHP: May 19, 1987
- Designated LAHCM: 1971-04-07

Memorial Branch is a branch library of the Los Angeles Public Library. It was built in 1930 based on a Gothic Revival design by architects John C. Austin and Frederic M. Ashley, the duo also responsible for Griffith Observatory. The library includes a large heraldic work of stained glass created by the artists at Judson Studios. Located directly across from Los Angeles High School, the library was named to honor former LAHS students who had lost their lives in the First World War. Their names, including that of aviator Greayer Clover were worked into a large stained glass window.

In 1987, the Memorial Branch and several other branch libraries in Los Angeles were added to the National Register of Historic Places as part of a thematic group submission. In the movie, Bedtime Stories, starring Adam Sandler, this library serves as the children's elementary school.

The Library underwent a major restoration in the mid-1990s, reopening in 1996. The library relocated to office space near John Burroughs Middle School in the interim.

== See also ==
- National Register of Historic Places listings in Los Angeles
- List of Los Angeles Historic-Cultural Monuments in the Wilshire and Westlake areas
- Los Angeles Public Library
