= Frederic M. Ashley =

American architect (1870–1963)

Frederic Morse Ashley
- Born: December 24, 1870; Rochester, New York, U.S.
- Died: February 1, 1960 (aged 89); Los Angeles County, California, U.S.
- Resting place: Forest Lawn Memorial Park, Glendale, California, U.S.
- Education: Massachusetts Institute of Technology
- Occupation: Architect
- Spouse: Ivy Russell
- Buildings: Griffith Observatory; Guaranty Building; Memorial Branch Library

Frederic Morse Ashley was an architect most notable for his association with John C. Austin. Together they were responsible for several landmark buildings in Los Angeles, California.

== Early life ==
Frederic M. Ashley was born in Rochester, New York, on December 24, 1870. He had at least one brother.

Frederic attended Massachusetts Institute of Technology c. 1896. He married Ivy Russell, also from Rochester, and the two moved to California for her health in 1905.

== Career ==
After moving to California, Frederic worked as a draftsman for Parkinson and Bergstrom, and by 1913, he was working in the same position for L.A. Investment Co.

Frederic was associated with John C. Austin from 1912 to 1937 and the two partnered in 1915. Frederic also worked as a supervising architect in Washington D.C. in 1935 and he retired in 1942.

== Later life and death ==
Frederic's wife Ivy died in Rochester in 1934. Frederic died of pneumonia on February 1, 1960, in Los Angeles County, California, either in a hospital in Pasadena or his home in Los Angeles. He was buried at Forest Lawn Memorial Park.

== List of works ==
Ashley's works include (in Los Angeles, California unless otherwise noted):

=== With John C. Austin ===
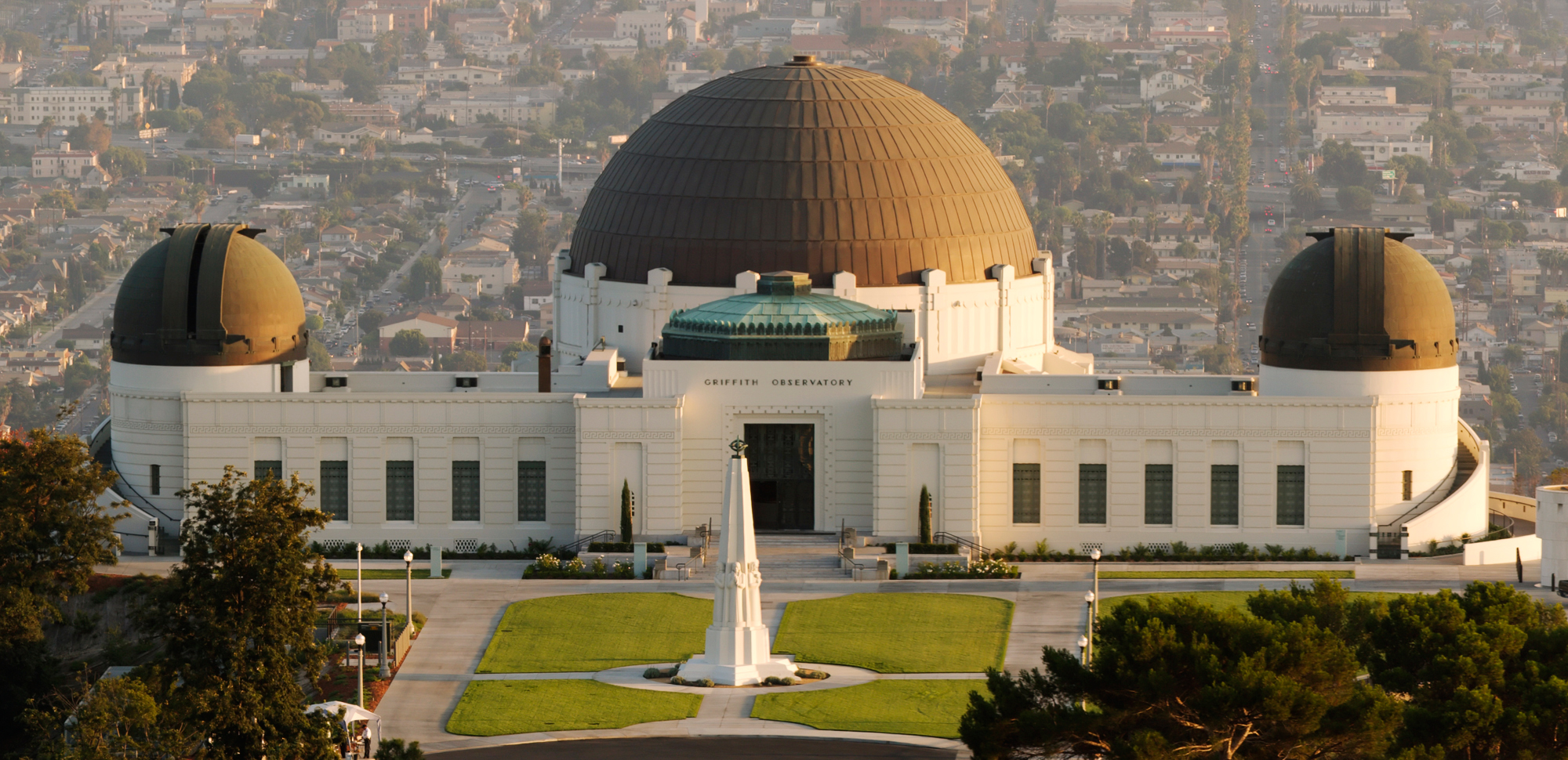
Griffith Observatory

- Guaranty Building (1923), NRHP-listed
- McKinley Art School enlargement, Pasadena (1924)
- Los Angeles Chamber of Commerce building (1924), with Parkinson and Parkinson
- Arroyo Seco Bank Building (1926), LAHCM No. 492
- Petit Tudor, Ventura (1929), Ventura Landmark 93
- House at 3719 N. Prestwick Drive (1929)
- Monrovia High School building, Monrovia (1929)
- Los Angeles High School building (pre-1930)
- Memorial Branch Library (1930), NRHP-listed
- Alexander Hamilton High School administration building (1931)
- Griffith Observatory (1933–1935), LAHCM No. 168
- Venice High School building (1935–1937)
- Florence Nightingale Middle School building (1937–1939)

Ashley and Austin were also consulting architects on Beverly Hills City Hall (1931) in Beverly Hills.

=== Other ===
- Frederic M. Ashley House (1906), LAHCM #402
- Arroyo Seco Regional Branch Library
