= Don Dixon (artist) =

American painter

Don Dixon (born 1951) is an American astronomical artist practicing space art in the tradition of Chesley Bonestell.

Born in Easton, Pennsylvania, Dixon has created cover art for Scientific American, Sky & Telescope, Omni, The Magazine of Fantasy & Science Fiction, Astronomy Magazine, and many other publications. Dixon's paintings have been used to illustrate the covers of several science fiction books, such as the Mars Trilogy by Kim Stanley Robinson and the Galactic Center Saga by Gregory Benford. He directed and co-wrote the immersive animated film Centered in the Universe, which premiered in 2006 at the Samuel Oschin Planetarium at Griffith Observatory, where he served as Art Director from 1991 to 2021. He is a founding member of the International Association of Astronomical Artists (IAAA) and was elected a Fellow of that organization in 2000.

== See also ==
- List of space artists
