= Centered in the Universe =

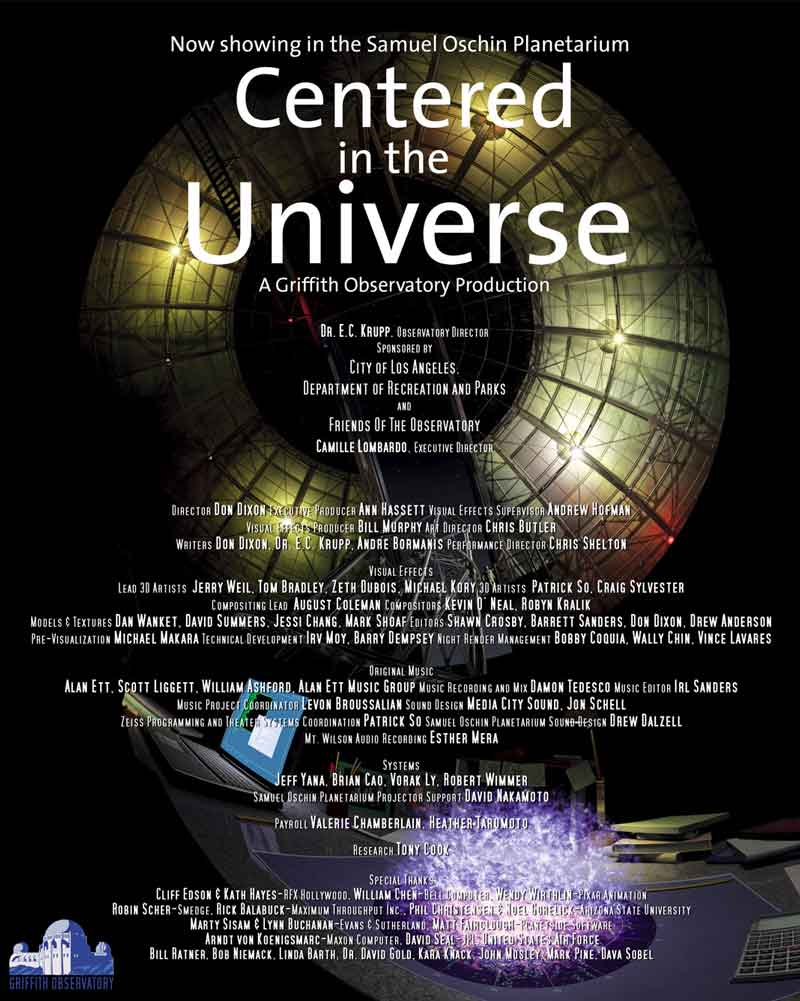
- Theatrical poster
- Directed by: Don Dixon
- Written by: André Bormanis; Don Dixon; Ed Krupp
- Produced by: Ann Hassett; Bill Murphy
- Edited by: Shawn Crosby; Barrett Sanders; Drew Anderson
- Music by: William Ashford; Alan Ett; Scott Liggett
- Distributed by: Griffith Observatory
- Release date: October 29, 2006
- Country: United States
- Language: English

Centered in the Universe is a fulldome presentation that premiered the evening of October 29, 2006, at the "Galactic Gala," which marked the reopening of the renovated Griffith Observatory in Los Angeles. The 33-minute planetarium program utilizes a Zeiss Universarium star projector and an innovative laser video projection system developed by Evans & Sutherland to create an immersive environment. A live presenter narrates the script.

== Synopsis ==
As the audience is seated, the planetarium dome is suffused with cool blue light, with a suggestion of clouds. The presenter walks to the center of the theater and flourishes a glowing ball, representing a star, about the size of a grapefruit, which he/she alternately lights and dims to accent a description of how various cultures interpreted celestial phenomena such as the cycle of day and night. At the conclusion of the introduction, the orb fades, the theater darkens, and the audience experiences a simulated sunset projected by the laser video system. As the sunset proceeds, the star projector rises to simulate the night sky. The lecturer asks the audience to imagine how mysterious the stars must have seemed to ancient people and then demonstrates, using the star projector, how people invented constellations in an effort to make sense of the randomly scattered stars. In accelerated time, we see the complex motions of the sun, moon, and planets.

The scene dissolves to ancient Alexandria, Egypt. We see the Great Library and the Pharos Lighthouse. In a courtyard, next to a pool surrounded by torches, we see the 2nd Century astronomer Claudius Ptolemy adjusting an armillary sphere to chart star positions. Behind Ptolemy is a small table on which rests a scroll. We approach the scroll and see that it depicts a geocentric universe model. Paintings on the scroll morph into 3D representations of the sun, Earth, and planets, which hover above the scroll and rotate within a complex system of crystalline spheres, illustrating the earth-centered model of the Universe that persisted until the Renaissance.

The flame from a lamp pans across the field of view and dissolves to a candle flame burning above the workshop table of Galileo Galilei in Italy around 1610. We move into a courtyard where Galileo is observing with his telescope. On the easel lit by a lantern, we see his sketches of the moons of Jupiter and the phases of Venus. These drawings also morphed into 3D objects to demonstrate how Galileo's observations transformed our perception of the planets and helped establish the Copernican model of the Solar System.

The film transports the audience through a series of environments, such as Mount Wilson Observatory in the early 1920s, when Edwin Hubble discovered the true nature of the Andromeda Galaxy and the expansion of the Universe. Over the desk of an anonymous modern researcher, we see a representation of the Big Bang. The device of transforming raw data, such as sketches and photographs, into 3D objects is used to suggest how scientists must apply imagination to interpret their observations.

Towards the end of the show, the audience experiences a simulated flight through clusters of galaxies, into the Milky Way Galaxy, the Solar System, skimming the surface of Mars, where the probable and tragic loss of oceans beckon the audience to wonder about the future of Earth, and then lands on the front lawn of Griffith Observatory.

The presenter once again appears with the glowing "star" and delivers an epilogue, summarizing that of all the things we have learned about the Universe, one of the most remarkable discoveries is that Earth and everything on it, including its inhabitants, are made from the clouds of dust and gas that lace the Milky Way Galaxy; that humans are made of stardust, which would possibly explain humanity's fascination with the night sky.

== Technical challenges ==
According to Andrew Hofman, Visual Effects Supervisor, "Centered in the Universe" presented unique challenges. "Some long-established practices in conventional film making are simply not available in the dome venue." For instance, changing lenses is not an option in a dome show; there is only one lens: the 180-degree fisheye, which makes near objects appear distorted while objects only a few feet from the virtual camera appear very tiny. Developing a visual style to work within this limitation was integral to the success of the show. The sheer size of the image files was also daunting. Each frame was composed of 17 million pixels instead of the mere 3 million required for conventional cinema. "Software behaved erratically, machines ran out of RAM; hard drives filled up and networks, even air conditioning, were overtaxed."

The Visual Effects Producer, Bill Murphy, had to create a schedule and budget for a production "that was not fully scripted requiring images never before created for a physical space that was not yet built." Delays in the delivery of the laser video projectors required animators to continue making color adjustments until a few days before the premiere, as the projectors themselves kept changing.

== Artistic challenges ==
Although every frame of the film was created using computer graphics, conventional artwork played an important role in developing the look and feel of the show. Art Director Chris Butler did extensive research to design props and sets that allow the 3D animators to create historically authentic environments. The animators visited the dome of the 100-inch (2,500 mm) telescope at Mount Wilson Observatory to photograph the building before constructing it in Maya (software) as it might have appeared in 1925 when Edwin Hubble worked there. "Dixon insisted on authenticity; from the location of planets in the sky to the kind of a feather in Galileo's quill pen, everything was meticulously researched," according to Executive Producer Ann Hassett. Animators studied photographs provided by Galileo expert Dava Sobel to ensure that architectural details of the astronomer's house were modeled correctly.

== Musical score ==
Centered in the Universe features an original orchestral score blending avant-garde and classical motifs composed by Alan Ett, Scott Liggett, and William Ashford from Alan Ett Music Group. The soundtrack is available from the iTunes store.
