= Astronomers Monument =

1934 public artwork in Los Angeles

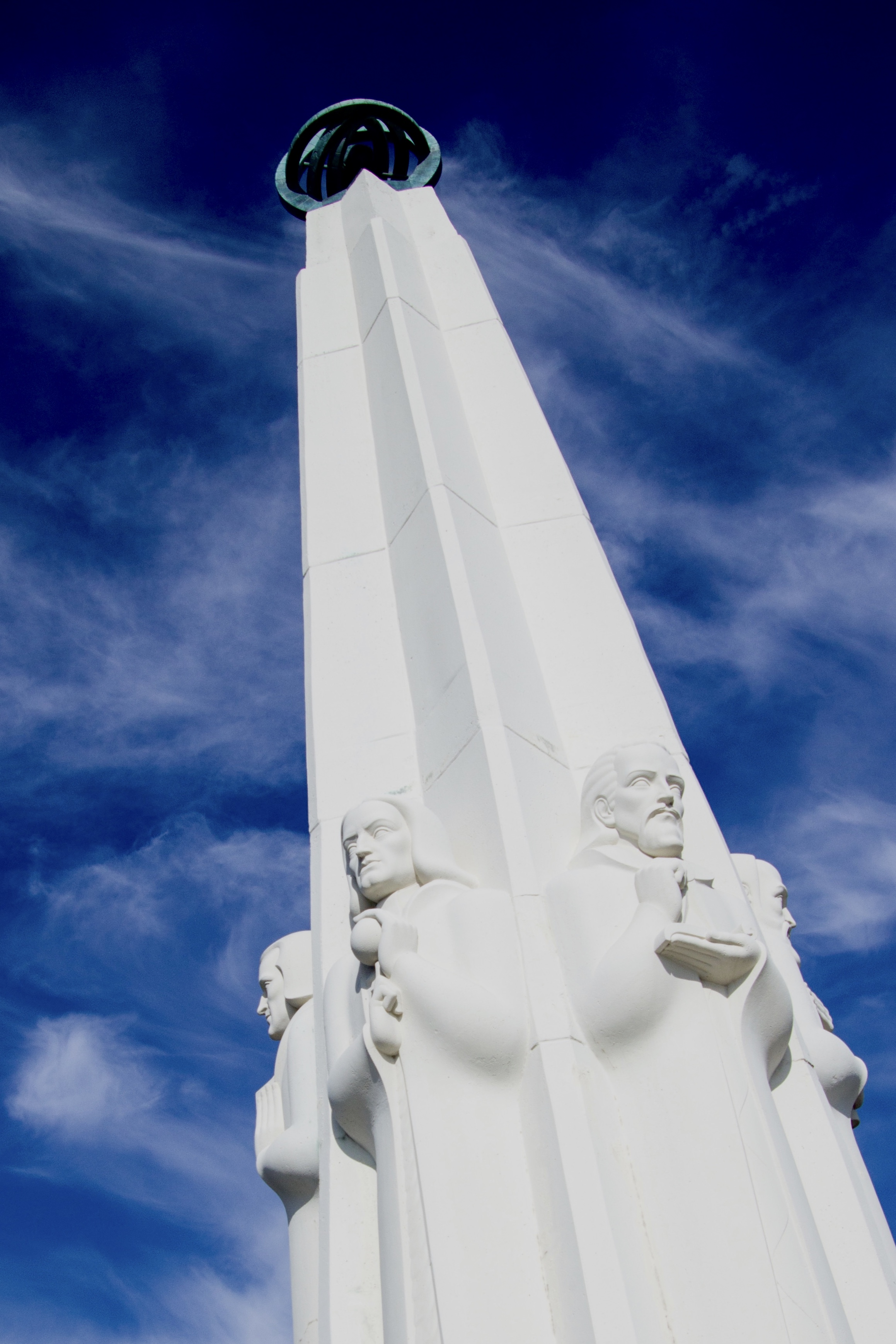
"Look to the Sky at the Astronomers Monument, Griffith Observatory 2018"

The Astronomers Monument in front of Griffith Observatory in Los Angeles, California is a New Deal artwork created under the auspices of the Public Works of Art Project. The large outdoor concrete sculpture honors the work of six great astronomers and is a Griffith Park landmark in its own right.

== History and design ==
The Astronomers Monument pays homage to six of the greatest astronomers of all time:

- Hipparchus (c. 190 – c. 120 BC),
- Nicolaus Copernicus (1473–1543),
- Galileo Galilei (1564–1642),
- Johannes Kepler (1571–1630),
- Isaac Newton (1642–1727),
- William Herschel (1738–1822).

In December 1933, the Los Angeles Park Commission and the Public Works of Art Project (PWAP) commissioned a sculpture project for the grounds of the under-construction Griffith Observatory. Using a design by local artist Archibald Garner and materials donated by the Women's Auxiliary of the Los Angeles Chamber of Commerce, six artists—Garner, Roger Noble Burnham (creator of USC's Tommy Trojan), Djey El Djey (1905-1980, real name Djey Owens), Gordon Newell (1905–1998), George Stanley (creator of the famous Oscar statuette presented at the Academy Awards), and Arnold Foerster (1878–1943)—sculpted and cast the concrete monument and figures. Each artist was responsible for sculpting one astronomer: Stanley did Newton, Garner sculpted Copernicus, Newell was responsible for Kepler, etc. (Burnham may have created the depiction of Herschel; the authorship of the Hipparchus and Galileo figures is unclear.)

According to the Los Angeles Times art critic Arthur Millier in 1934, the "original idea" was Foerster's, and he was "responsible for the delicate engineering entailed in pouring a forty-foot concrete shaft." The monument is topped with an armillary sphere, originally concrete, replaced with a bronze piece in 1991.

On November 25, 1934, almost six months prior to the opening of the Observatory on May 14, 1935, a celebration took place to mark completion of the Astronomers Monument. The only "signature" on the Astronomers Monument is "PWAP 1934," referring to the program which funded the project and the year in which it was completed.

== See also ==
- List of New Deal sculpture
- List of public art in Los Angeles
- Isaac Newton in popular culture
- Santa Monica, another large cast-concrete PWAP sculpture in Los Angeles County
