= Fremont Hotel, Los Angeles =

Fremont Hotel
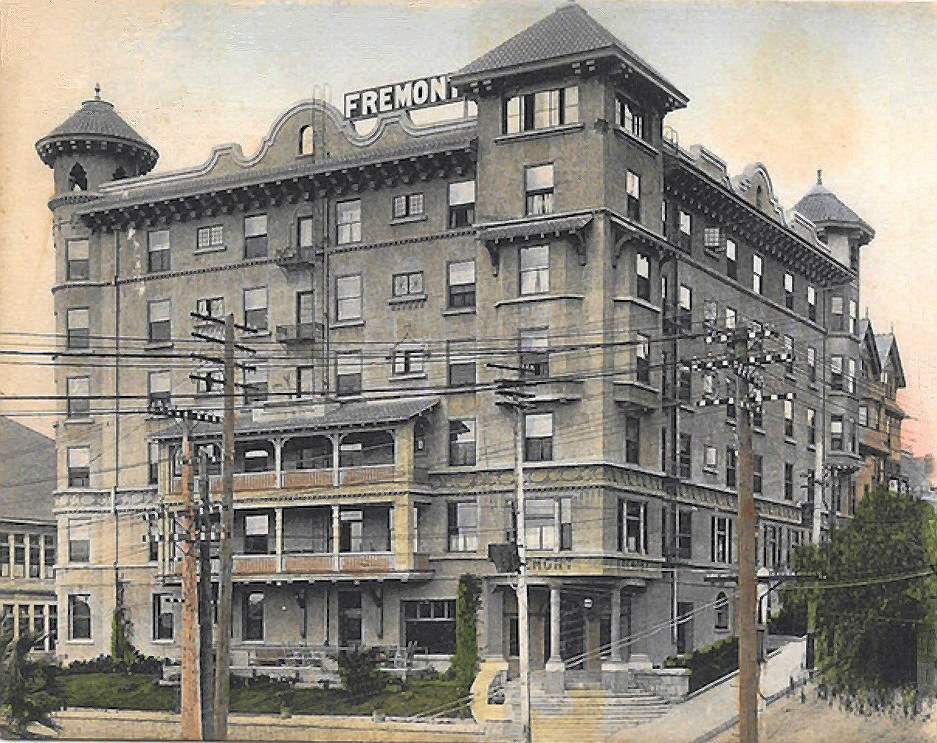

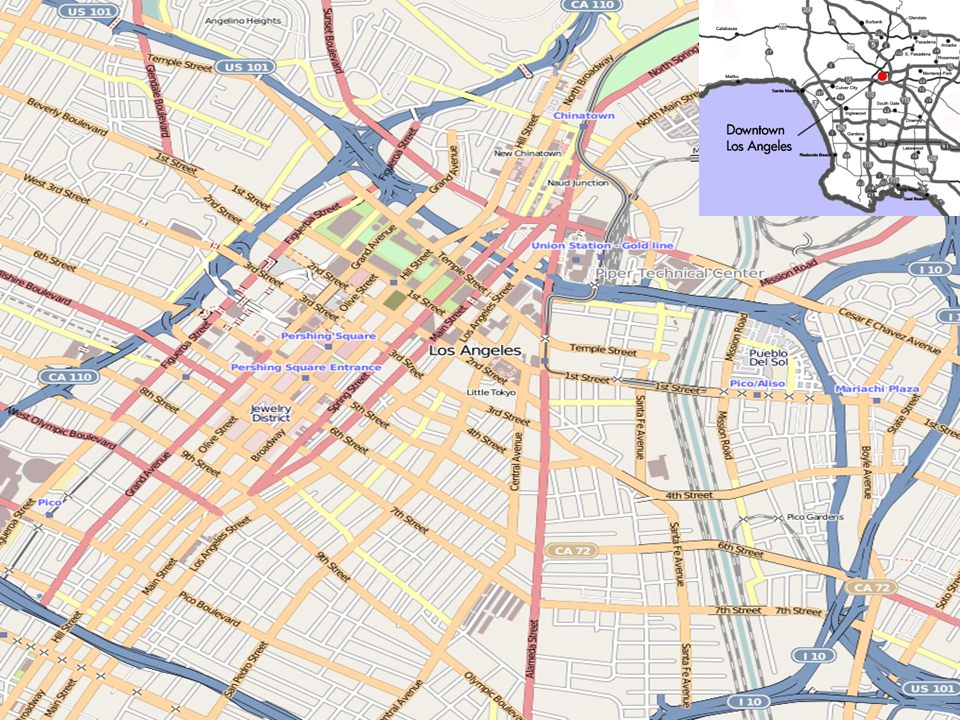
- Location within Downtown Los Angeles

General information
- Type: Hotel
- Location: Downtown, Los Angeles, California, 401 South Olive Street, United States
- Coordinates: 34°3′3.1″N 118°15′6.5″W
- Opened: September 9, 1902
- Demolished: 1955

Other information
- Number of rooms: 100

The Fremont Hotel was a hotel in the Bunker Hill suburb of Downtown Los Angeles, California. Situated at 401 South Olive Street on the southwest corner of Fourth and Olive streets, the hotel opened in September 1902 on California Admission Day and closed in the 1940s. The hotel was demolished in 1955.

== History ==
The hotel, located in the Bunker Hill suburb, was built and designed by the architect John C. Austin and developed by Thomas Pascoe. The plans for building the hotel were developed in November 1901 and initially faced resistance from the next door Olive Street School establishment. It was designed by the architect in the Mission style, and had some 100 rooms. It opened on September 9, 1902, and was named after John C. Frémont. When newly built it was billed as "the newest and most elegantly appointed family hotel in Los Angeles.” The hotel also held dinners in tribute to Frémont. Frémont's widow, Jessie, was the first registered guest. She also designed and executed the hotel's crest. Frémont's motto, "Eternal vigilance is the price of safety" was adopted as the hotel's motto of the hotel, paraphrased into "Eternal vigilance is the price of success in the hotel business". On 21 January 1903, the hotel was the venue of banquet organized in honour of John Freemont, (after whom the hotel was named) the builder of Los Angeles from the arid desert lands.

In 1913, under the hotel's then owner Colonel Richard A von Falkenberg it was running under loss, and he was reported missing probably to avoid creditors. The Los Angeles Times reported that the hotel owner Falkenberg and his wife had disappeared due to "a precarious financial position," he explained it as case of nervousness and that he had gone to Ventura for a rest. Also reported from the hotel were several thefts and embezzlements. On 13 February 1913, Mary Jauch, then owner of the hotel, had jewelry stolen worth $8,300.

The hotel briefly appears in the background near the end of Charlie Chaplin's 1914 debut film, Making a Living, during a fight scene on the road. The Fremont Hotel is also shown twice in the 1950 film noir feature Backfire starring Gordon MacRae and Virginia Mayo. George F. Fellows was arrested in his room in March 1927 for broadcasting on the radio. Though it billed itself as "[t]he newest and most elegantly appointed family hotel in Los Angeles", by 1948, the hotel was a dilapidated and ill maintained establishment. The hotel was demolished by 1955 by the Community Redevelopment Agency, and what remained was only the retaining wall next to the Olive Public School.

== Architecture and fittings ==
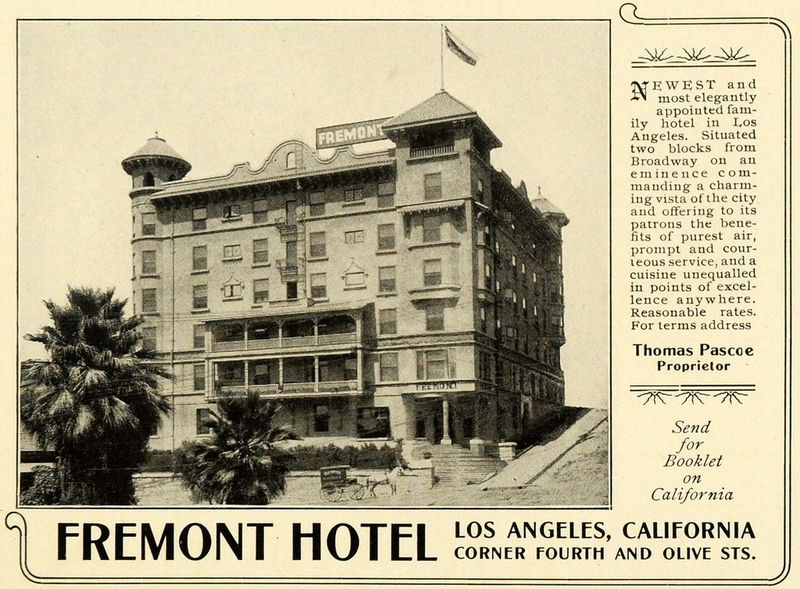

The six-storied Mission style structure was constructed of brick, steel lath and cement, its ground plan being L-shaped. The large, square windows to the west had ocean and garden views, while those the north, east, and south sides had city and mountain views. Because of its topographic eminence on Bunker Hill, it was the only hotel in the city where every room faced the Sun.

The building was steam-heated throughout. Wide halls were fitted with large windows and fire escapes. Room options included singles or suites, and they were outfitted with a private bath, closets, electric lights, gas, and telephone. The ground floor contained the management office, billiard room, and writing rooms. The dining room featured windows on each side. A ladies' parlor and receptions rooms were situated on the first floor, which incorporated a park-facing veranda.
