= John C. Austin =

American architect (1870–1963)

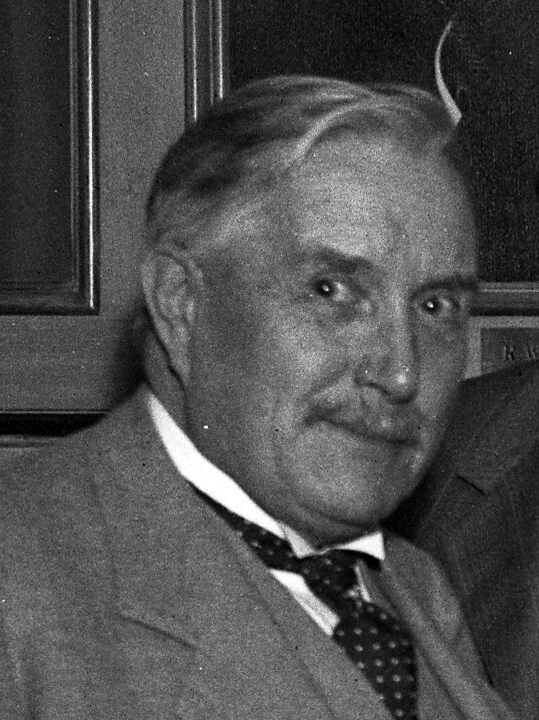
- Austin in 1931
- Born: John Corneby Wilson Austin; February 13, 1870; Bodicote, Oxfordshire, England
- Died: September 3, 1963 (aged 93); Pasadena, California, U.S.
- Resting place: Mountain View Cemetery, Altadena, California
- Occupation: Architect
- Buildings: Griffith Observatory; Los Angeles City Hall; Shrine Auditorium; Hollywood Masonic Temple

John Corneby Wilson Austin (February 13, 1870 – September 3, 1963) was an architect and civic leader who participated in the design of several landmark buildings in Southern California, including the Griffith Observatory, Los Angeles City Hall, and the Shrine Auditorium.

== Life ==
Born in Bodicote, Oxfordshire, England, Austin was an apprentice to architect Williams S. Barwick in the late 1880s. He moved to the United States and worked as a draftsman for architect Benjamin Linfoot of Philadelphia from 1891–1892, before relocating to San Francisco where he was a draftsman at Mooser and Devlin from 1892-1895. He moved to Los Angeles in 1895, and became one of the city's leading architects. He was associated with Frederic M. Ashley from 1912 to 1937 and the two formed a partnership in 1915.

Austin was also active in civic affairs in Los Angeles. He was elected President of the Los Angeles Chamber of Commerce in January 1930. As head of the Chamber of Commerce, Austin initiated a public-art campaign to beautify the city through the erection of statuary and monuments. One of the issues on which Austin became a leader was the need to develop a larger water system for Los Angeles. He spoke publicly and was an advocate in the business community in favor of a 1930 bond issue to raise $38.8 million to develop the city's water supply.

As the Great Depression deepened in Los Angeles, Austin also advocated federal spending as a means to stimulate the economy. In April 1930, a letter from Austin to President Herbert Hoover was published in the Los Angeles Times. In it, Austin proposed the creation of an emergency fund, raised by taxation or appropriation, which could be used to develop public improvements and to provide needed employment. Austin argued that such programs were needed so that otherwise good citizens not fall "prey to the propaganda of Communists and agitators against our institutions." In January 1931, after expressing concern that "we are just drifting along in this matter," Austin traveled to Washington, D.C. to press for federal construction projects in Los Angeles. Austin announced that he was going east "with a crowbar to try and pry something loose," vowing to stay as long as he felt he could help get things started. Later that year, President Hoover appointed Austin to coordinate the federal government's unemployment relief efforts in ten Southern California counties. Shortly after his appointment to the relief effort, however, Austin's wife of 29 years, Hilda Violet Austin, the mother of nine children with Austin, died at their home in Pasadena.

Austin also served as the President of the State Board of Architectural Examiners, a member of the National Labor Board responsible for labor disputes in Southern California, President of the Southern California Historical Society, President of the Jonathan Club, and a 32nd degree Mason. In 1949, the Los Angeles Chamber of Commerce presented Austin with its first ever Achievement Award. In 1963, Los Angeles Mayor Samuel Yorty presented Austin with a scroll commending him "for serving in an outstanding manner as a distinguished architect."

Austin died in 1963 at his home in Pasadena, California.

== List of works ==
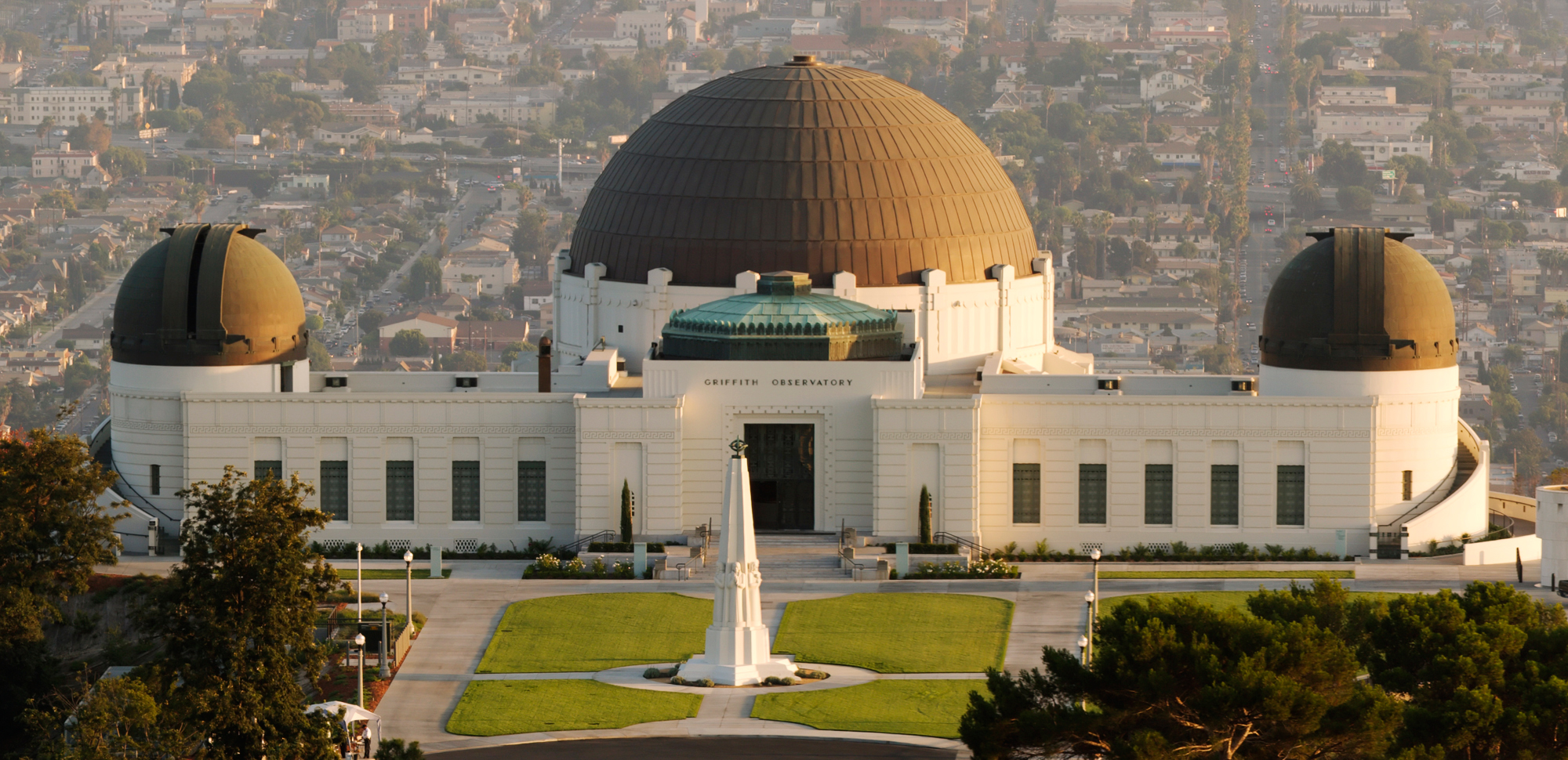
Griffith Observatory

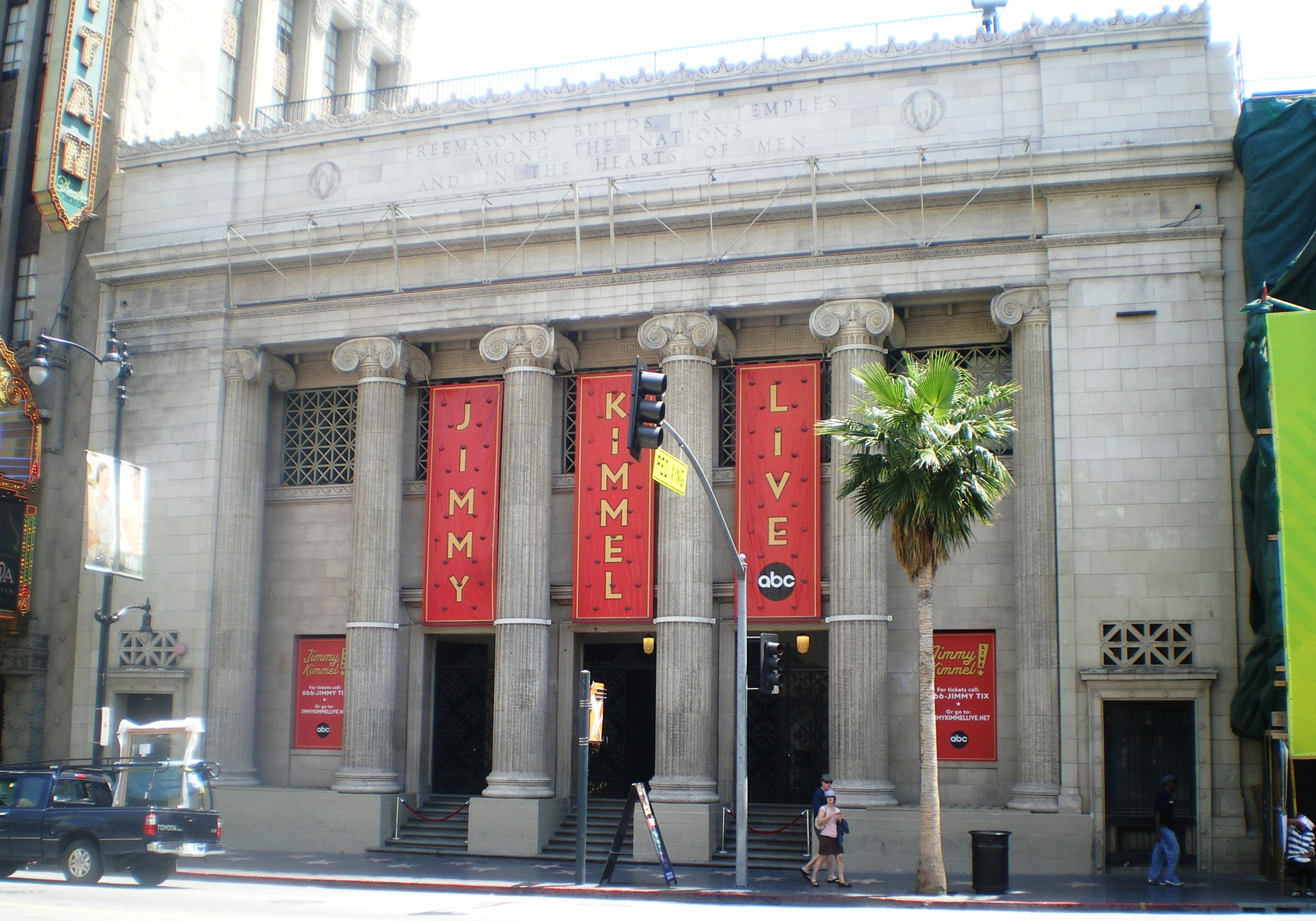
Hollywood Masonic Temple

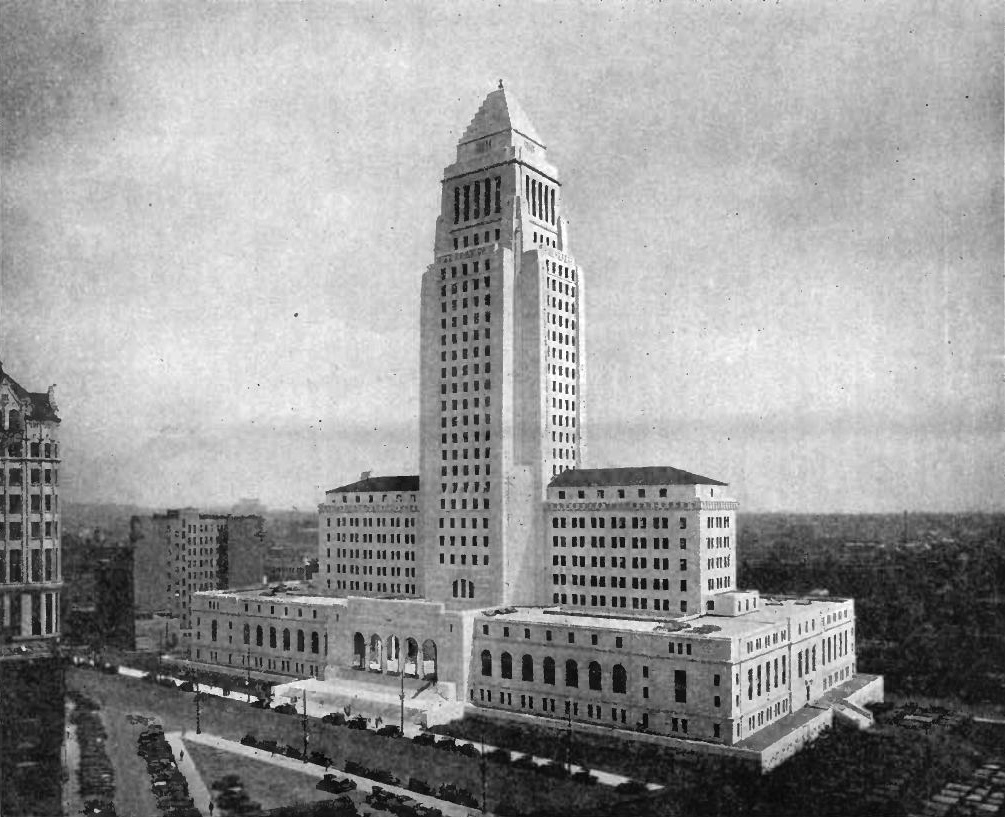
LA City Hall

Austin's works include (in Los Angeles, California unless otherwise noted):

=== With Frederic M. Ashley ===
- Guaranty Building (1923), NRHP-listed
- McKinley Art School enlargement, Pasadena (1924)
- Los Angeles Chamber of Commerce building (1924), with Parkinson and Parkinson
- Arroyo Seco Bank Building (1926), LAHCM No. 492
- Petit Tudor, Ventura (1929), Ventura Landmark 93
- House at 3719 N. Prestwick Drive (1929)
- Monrovia High School building, Monrovia (1929)
- Los Angeles High School building (pre-1930)
- Memorial Branch Library (1930), NRHP-listed
- Alexander Hamilton High School administration building (1931)
- Griffith Observatory (1933–1935), LAHCM No. 168
- Venice High School building (1935–1937)
- Florence Nightingale Middle School building (1937–1939)

Austin and Ashley were also consulting architects on Beverly Hills City Hall (1931) in Beverly Hills.

=== Other works ===
- Higgins/Verbeck/Hirsch Mansion (1902)
- Fremont Hotel (1902, demolished 1955)
- Potter Hotel, Santa Barbara (1902–1903, burned 1921)
- Beckett Mansion (1905)
- Virginia Hotel, Long Beach (1907, razed c. 1935)
- Carnegie Library, Anaheim (1909), NRHP-listed
- Hollywood Masonic Temple (1921), NRHP-listed, LAHCM No. 277
- Los Angeles Hall of Justice (1925), with the Allied Architects Association
- Shrine Auditorium (1925–1926), NRHP-listed, LAHCM No. 139
- Los Angeles City Hall (1928), with John Parkinson and Albert C. Martin, Sr., LAHCM No. 150
- California State Building (1931, demolished 1976)
- NBC Radio City Studios (1939)
- St. Vincent's Hospital
- St. Paul's Catholic Church
- The first State Building in the Los Angeles Civic Center
