= Griffith Observatory =

Observatory in Los Angeles, California

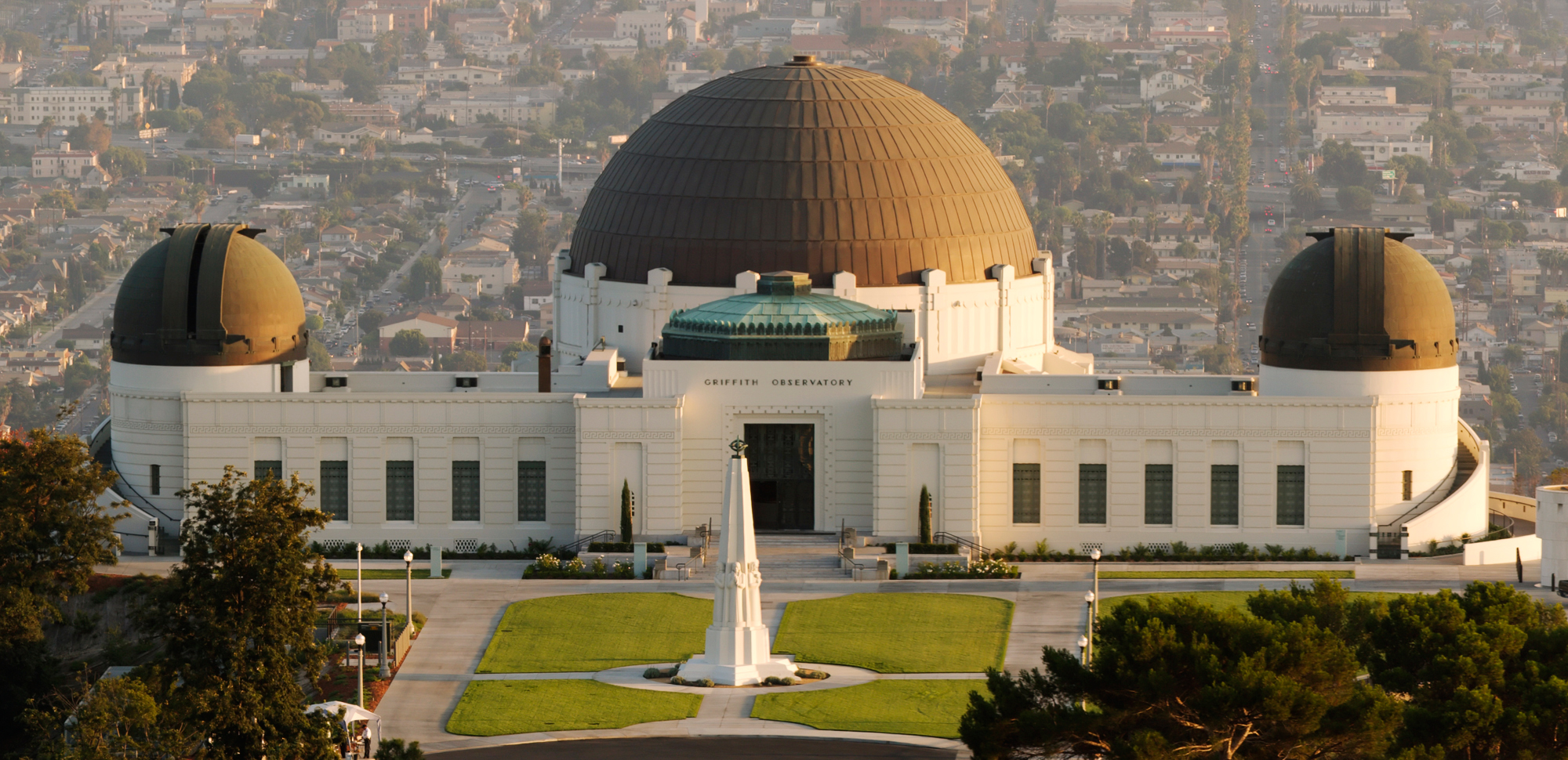
- Griffith Observatory in September 2006

- Location within Los Angeles
- Former names: Griffith

General information
- Architectural style: Greco-Roman and Art Deco
- Location: Los Feliz, Los Angeles, California, United States
- Coordinates: 34°07′6″N 118°18′1.2″W
- Elevation: 1,135 ft (346 m)
- Construction started: June 20, 1933
- Inaugurated: May 14, 1935
- Client: Griffith Trust

Design and construction
- Architects: John C. Austin; Frederic M. Ashley

Website
- griffithobservatory.lacity.gov

Los Angeles Historic-Cultural Monument
- Designated: November 17, 1976
- Reference no.: 168

Griffith Observatory is an observatory in Los Angeles, California, on the south-facing slope of Mount Hollywood in Griffith Park. It commands a view of the Los Angeles Basin including Downtown Los Angeles to the southeast, Hollywood to the south, and the Pacific Ocean to the southwest. The observatory is a popular tourist attraction with a close view of the Hollywood Sign and an extensive array of space and science-related displays. Named after its benefactor, Griffith J. Griffith, admission has been free since the observatory's opening in 1935, in accordance with his will.

Since its opening, over 9 million people have looked through the 12-inch (30.5 cm) Zeiss refracting scope, making it the most viewed telescope in the world. The space theme prevails in the interior.

== History ==
On December 16, 1896, 3,015 acres (12.20 km^{2}) of land surrounding the observatory was donated to the City of Los Angeles by Griffith J. Griffith. In his will he donated funds to build an observatory, exhibit hall, and planetarium on the donated land. Griffith's objective was to make astronomy accessible to the public, as opposed to the prevailing idea that observatories should be located on remote mountaintops and restricted to scientists.

Griffith drafted detailed specifications for the observatory. In drafting the plans, he consulted with Walter Sydney Adams, the future director of Mount Wilson Observatory, and George Ellery Hale, who founded (with Andrew Carnegie) the first astrophysical telescope in Los Angeles.

Construction began on June 20, 1933, using a design developed by architects John C. Austin and Frederic M. Ashley, based on preliminary sketches by Russell W. Porter. The observatory and accompanying exhibits were opened to the public on May 14, 1935, as the country's third planetarium. In its first five days of operation the observatory logged more than 13,000 visitors. Dinsmore Alter was the museum's director during its first years.

During World War II, the planetarium was used to train pilots in celestial navigation. The planetarium was again used for this purpose in the 1960s to train Apollo program astronauts for the first lunar missions.

=== Griffith Observatory Foundation ===
Griffith Observatory Foundation was chartered in 1978 as Friends of the Observatory. It was founded by Debra Griffith and Harold Griffith (the grandson of the observatory's benefactor) with Dr. E.C. Krupp (the current Observatory Director) and a small group of dedicated partners. The foundation supports the observatory in its mission of public astronomy and advocated the restoration and expansion of the observatory. The foundation continues to promote the observatory as an agent of science literacy, education, and experiential astronomy.

=== Renovation and expansion ===
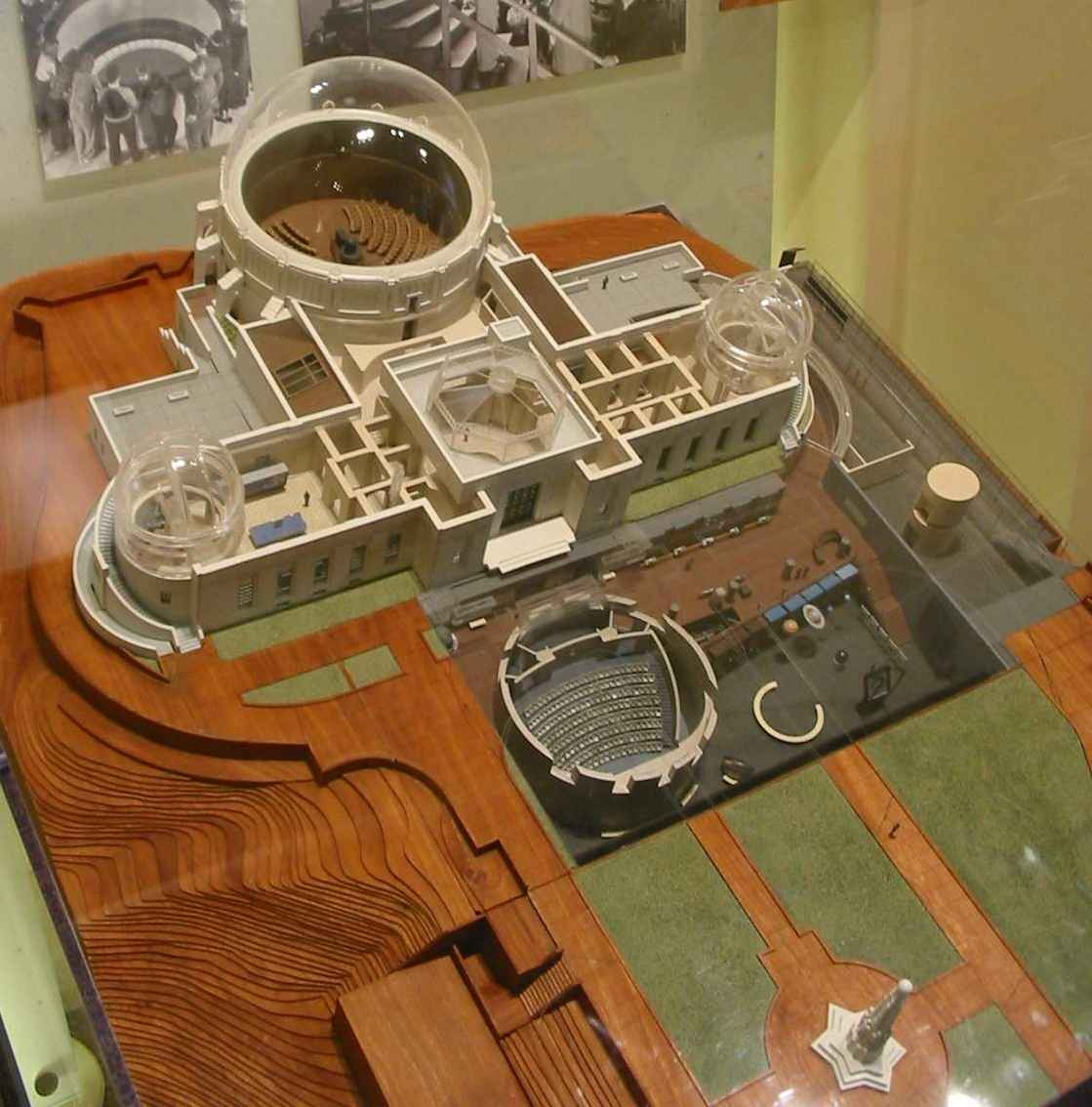
A model showing the underground area added during the 2002-2006 renovation

The observatory closed on January 6, 2002, for renovation and a major expansion of exhibit space. It reopened to the public on November 2, 2006, retaining its Art Deco exterior. The $93 million renovation, paid largely by a public bond issue, restored the building, as well as replaced the aging planetarium dome. The building was expanded underground, with completely new exhibits, a café, gift shop, and the new Leonard Nimoy Event Horizon Theater.

On May 25, 2008, the Observatory offered visitors live coverage of the Phoenix landing on Mars.

Ed Krupp has been the director of the Observatory since 1974. He has been responsible for updating the technology and the building for 52 years.

=== 2028 Summer Olympics ===
During the 2028 Summer Olympics, the Griffith Observatory will be the finishing point for the cycling road race and the road cycling time trials.

== Architecture and design ==
Griffith Observatory combines Greek and Beaux-Arts styles and also contains Moderne influences. The exterior is embellished with the Greek key pattern.

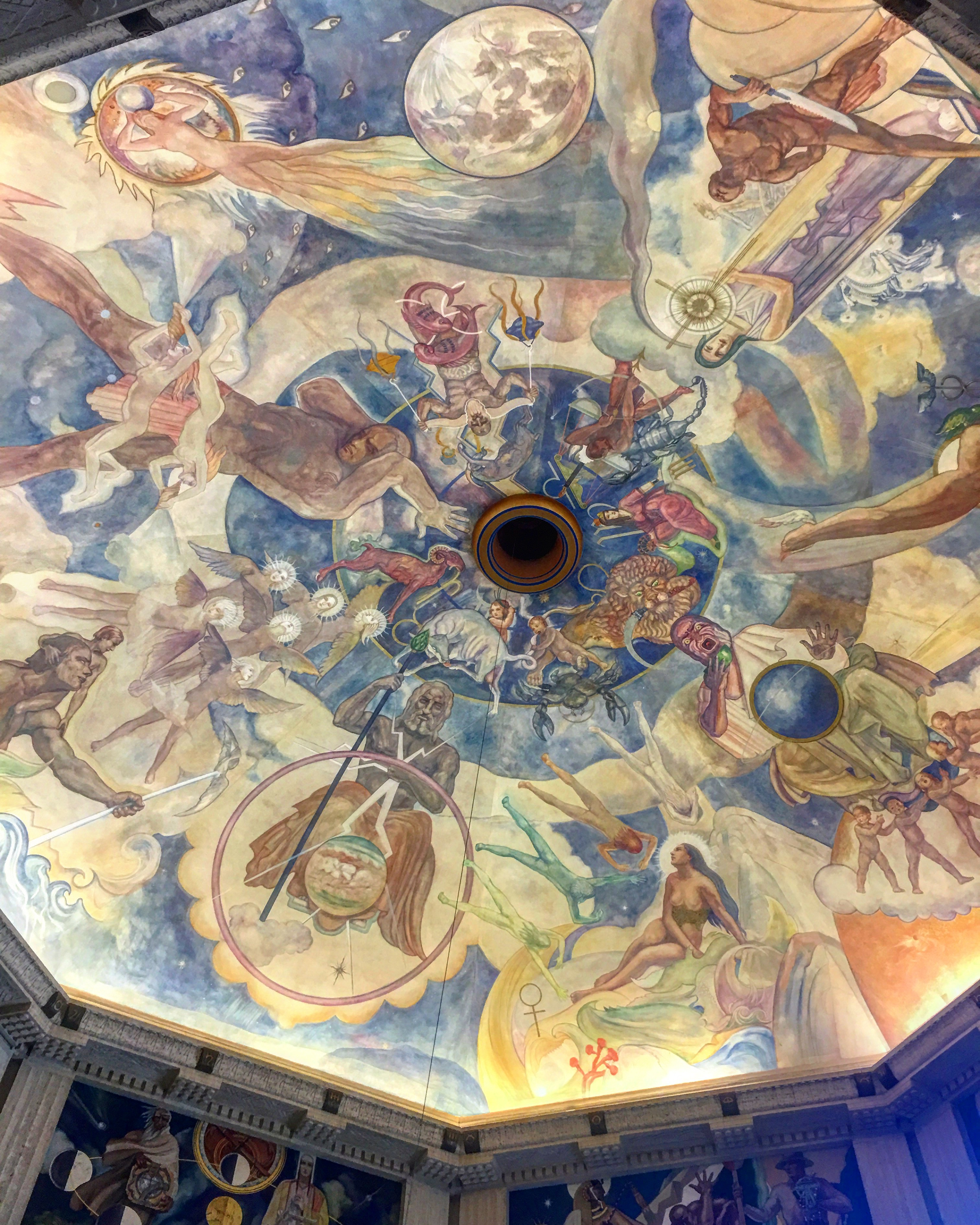
Rotunda ceiling

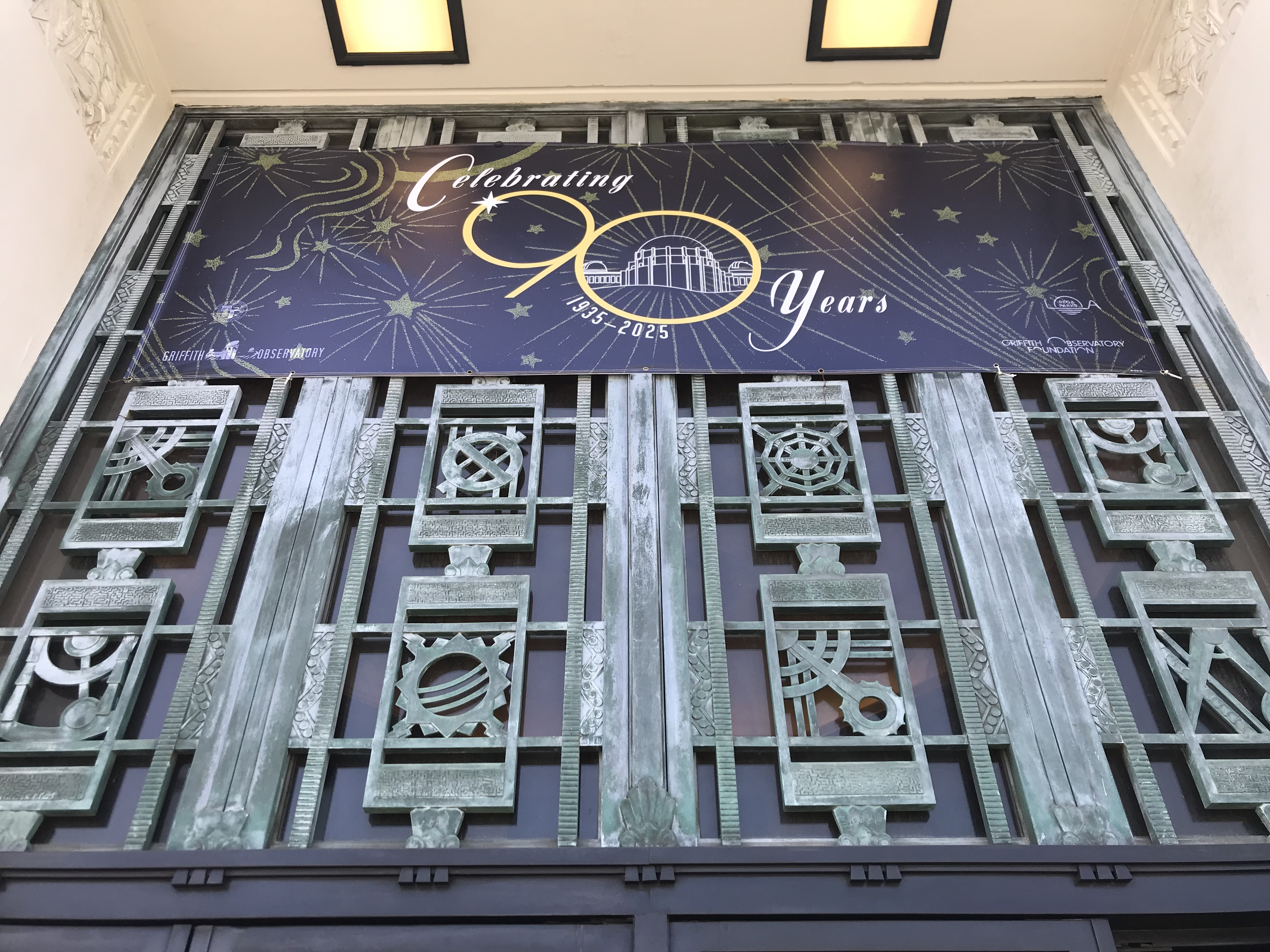
Ironwork above the entrance and below a sign marking the Observatory's 90th anniversary

== Exhibits ==
The first exhibit visitors encountered in 1935 was the Foucault pendulum, which was designed to demonstrate the rotation of the Earth. The exhibits also included a 12-inch (305mm) Zeiss refracting telescope in the east dome, a triple-beam coelostat (solar telescope) in the west dome, and a thirty-eight foot relief model of the moon's north polar region.

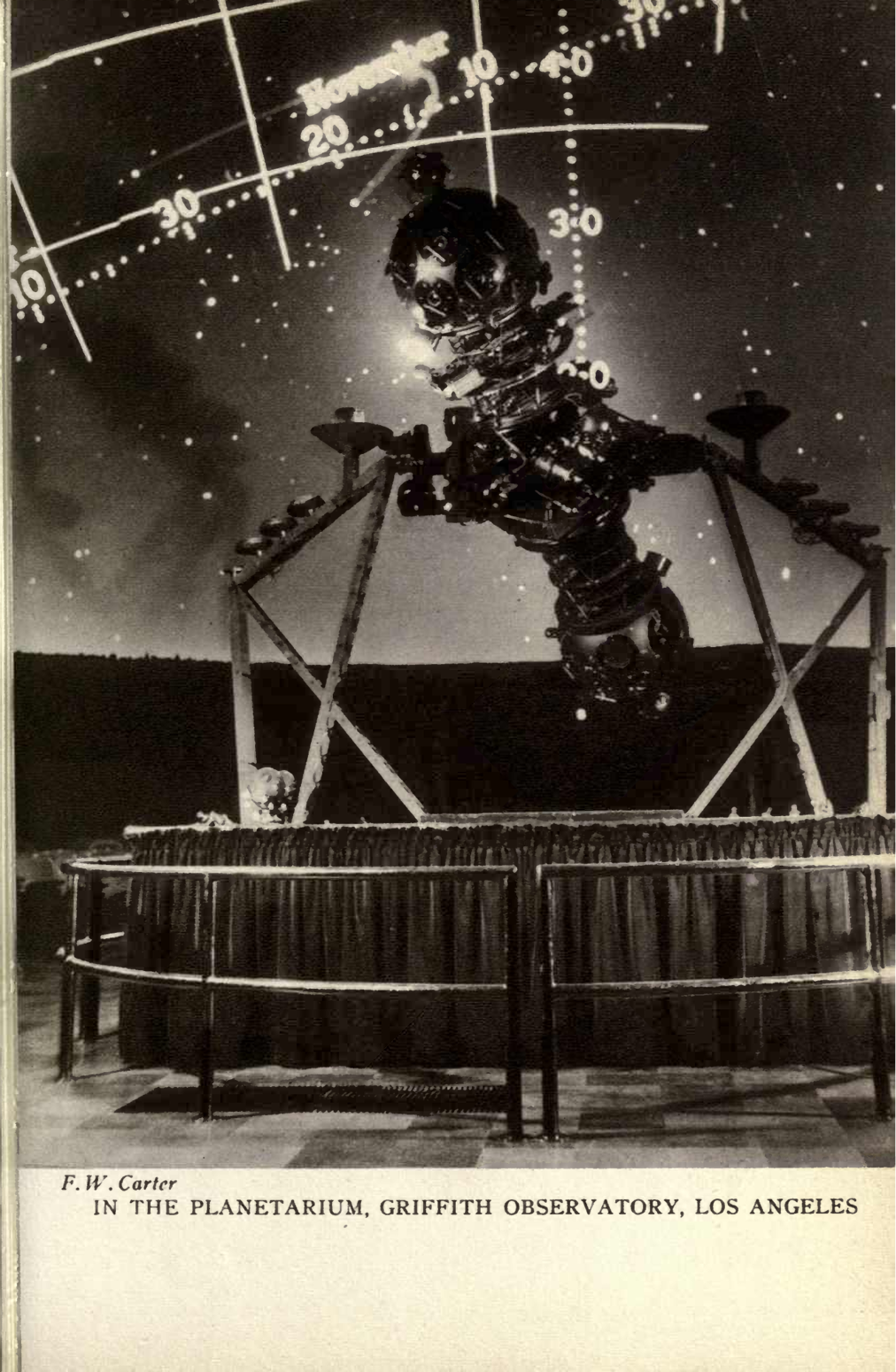
The planetarium c. 1937–1939

Griffith requested that the observatory include a display on evolution which was accomplished with the Cosmochron exhibit which included a narration from Caltech Professor Chester Stock and an accompanying slide show. The evolution exhibit existed from 1937 to the mid-1960s. Also included in the original design was a planetarium under the large central dome. The first shows covered topics including the Moon, worlds of the Solar System, and eclipses.

The planetarium theater was renovated in 1964 and a Mark IV Zeiss projector was installed.

The Café at the End of the Universe, an homage to Restaurant at the End of the Universe, is one of many cafés run by celebrity chef Wolfgang Puck. One wall inside the building is covered with the largest astronomically accurate image ever constructed (152 feet (46 m) long by 20 feet (6.1 m) high), called "The Big Picture", depicting the Virgo Cluster of galaxies; visitors can explore the highly detailed image from within arm's reach or through telescopes 60 feet (18 m) away. In 2006 the 1964-vintage Zeiss Mark IV star projector was replaced with a Zeiss Mark IX Universarium. The former planetarium projector is part of the underground exhibit on ways in which humanity has visualized the skies.

Centered in the Universe features a high-resolution immersive video projected by an innovative laser system developed by Evans and Sutherland Corporation, along with a short night sky simulation projected by the Zeiss Universarium. A team of animators, directed by observatory art director Don Dixon who also co-wrote the script, worked more than two years to create the 30-minute program. Actors, holding a glowing orb, perform the presentation, under the direction of Chris Shelton. Tickets for the show are purchased separately at the box office within the observatory. Tickets are sold on a first-come, first-served basis. Children under 5 are free, but are admitted to only the first planetarium show of the day. Only members of the observatory's support group, Friends of the Observatory, may reserve tickets for the planetarium show.

The observatory is split up into six sections: The Wilder Hall of the Eye, the Ahmanson Hall of the Sky, the W. M. Keck Foundation Central Rotunda, the Cosmic Connection, the Gunther Depths of Space Hall, and the Edge of Space Mezzanine.

The Wilder Hall of the Eye, located in the east wing of the main level focuses on astronomical tools like telescopes and how they evolved over time so people can see further into space. Interactive features there include a Tesla coil and a "Camera Obscura", which uses mirrors and lenses to focus light onto a flat surface.

The Ahmanson Hall of the Sky, located in the west wing, focuses on objects that are normally found in the sky, like the Sun and Moon. The main centerpiece of this section is a large solar telescope projecting images of the Sun, using a series of mirrors called coelostats. Exhibits here include a periodic table of the elements, a Hertzsprung-Russell diagram, and several alcoves showing exhibits about topics like day and night, the paths of the Sun and stars, the seasons, the phases of the Moon, tides, and eclipses. The W. M. Keck Foundation Central Rotunda features several Hugo Ballin murals on the ceiling and upper walls restored since 1934, a Foucault pendulum that demonstrates the Earth's rotation, and a small exhibit dedicated to Griffith J. Griffith, after whom the observatory is named.

Director Ed Krupp Explains the Cosmic Connection Exhibit
recorded in 2017

The Cosmic Connection is a 150 ft long hallway connecting the main building and the underground exhibition areas (see below) that depicts the history of the universe, and dramatizes the amount of time that has passed from the Big Bang to the present day, using hundreds of individual pieces of astronomy-related jewelry.

The Gunther Depths of Space Hall is the lower level of the observatory, dominated by "The Big Picture," and scale models of the Solar System. The planets (including dwarf planet Pluto) are shown relative to the size of the Sun, which is represented by the diameter of the Leonard Nimoy Event Horizon Theater. Below each planet are listed facts, as well as scales indicating a person's weight on planets having a solid surface (or weight at an altitude where atmospheric pressure would equal one bar otherwise). In addition, beneath the Earth's model, there is a small room containing a large model Earth globe, an older Zeiss planetarium projector, and a set of seismograph rolls, including one tracking room motion caused by occupants. The other rolls are attached to seismographs monitoring movement at the bedrock level, and indicate actual seismic activity. On the north wall of the Depths of Space is "The Big Picture", a 150 feet (46 m) by 20 feet (6.1 m) photograph (the largest astronomical image in the world) showing a portion of the Virgo Cluster of galaxies at an angular scale of 0.1 degree per foot. This image was taken over the course of 11 nights by the 48-inch Samuel Oschin telescope at Palomar Mountain. There is also a bronze statue of Albert Einstein sitting on a bench in the Depths of Space. Einstein is holding his index finger about 1 foot (0.30 m) in front of his eyes, to illustrate the visual area of space that is captured in The Big Picture.

The Edge of Space Mezzanine, which overlooks the Depths of Space Hall, focuses more on astronomy related topics that involve celestial bodies much closer to Earth, with exhibits including meteorite displays, an asteroid impact simulator, cloud and spark chambers, a large globe of the Moon, and telescopes that allow inspection of The Big Picture from a distance.

=== Tesla coil ===
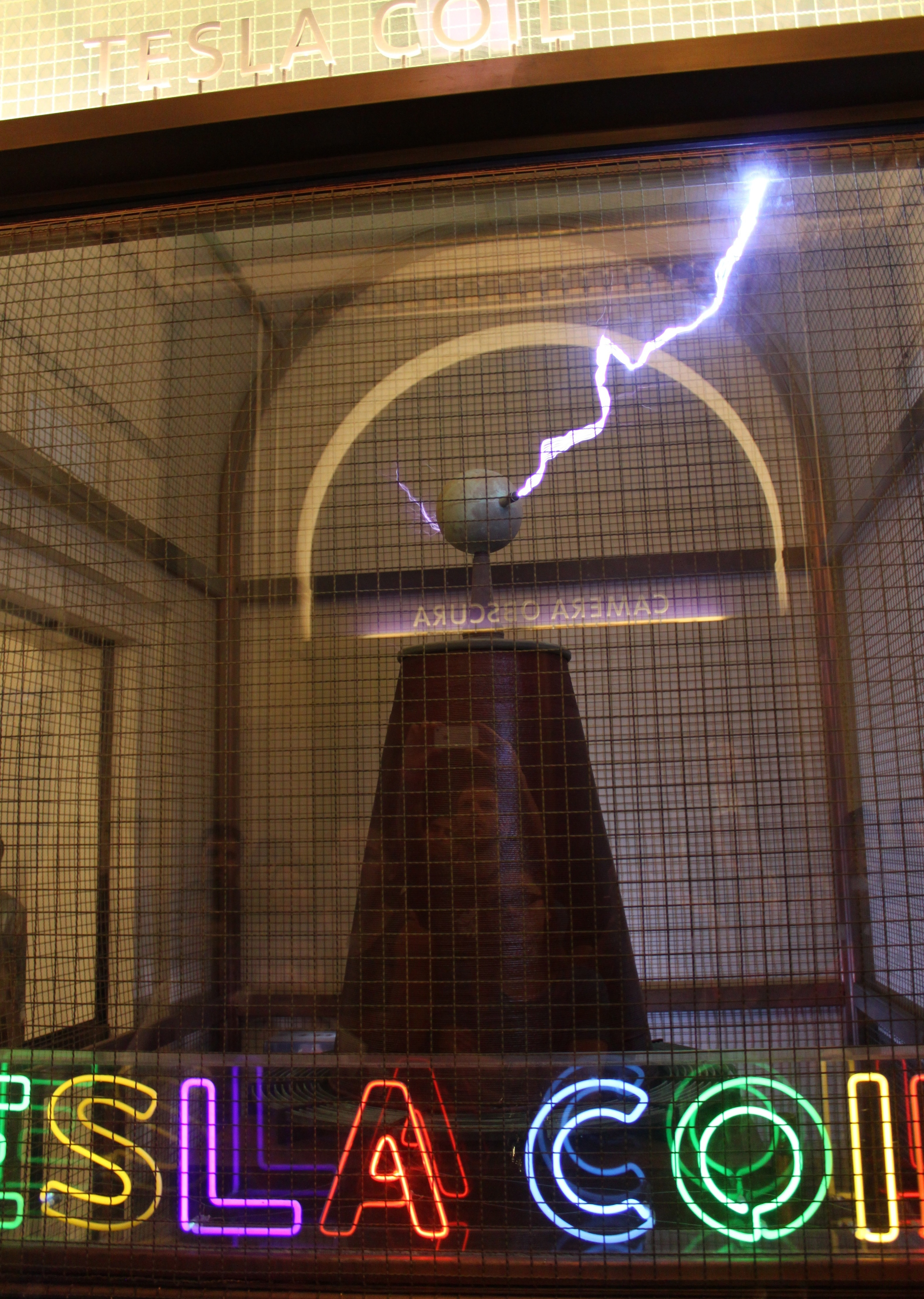
Tesla coil at the Observatory

On display at the Observatory is a large Tesla coil, named for its inventor, Nikola Tesla. Dubbed "GPO-1", it is one of a pair which were built in 1910 by Earle Ovington. Ovington, who would go on to fame as an aviator, ran a company which built high voltage generators for medical X-ray and electrotherapy devices. In public demonstrations of his generators, the spectacular displays drew crowds. Ovington designed the Observatory's coil to surpass a coil made by Elihu Thomson in 1893 which generated a 64-inch spark. (Tesla had secretly produced much larger sparks in 1899.) The project caught the attention of an Edison Electric Illuminating Company official, who offered $1,000 if the coil were displayed at an upcoming electrical show in Madison Square Garden, with the stipulation that the machine would produce sparks not less than ten feet long.

The machine, dubbed the Million Volt Oscillator, was installed in the band balcony overlooking the arena. At the top of each hour the lights in the main hall were shut off, and sparks would shoot from the copper ball atop the coil to a matching coil 122 inches away, or to a wand held by an assistant. The chief engineer of the General Electric Company estimated that the discharges were at least 1.3 million volts.

Ovington, who died in 1936, gave the matching Tesla coils to his old electrotherapy colleague Frederick Finch Strong, who in 1937 donated them to Griffith Observatory. The Observatory had room to exhibit only one of the pair. By this time the machine was missing parts, so Observatory staffer Leon Hall restored it with the notable assistance of Hollywood special effects expert Kenneth Strickfaden who designed the special effects for Frankenstein (1931) among many other movies.

=== Astronomers Monument ===
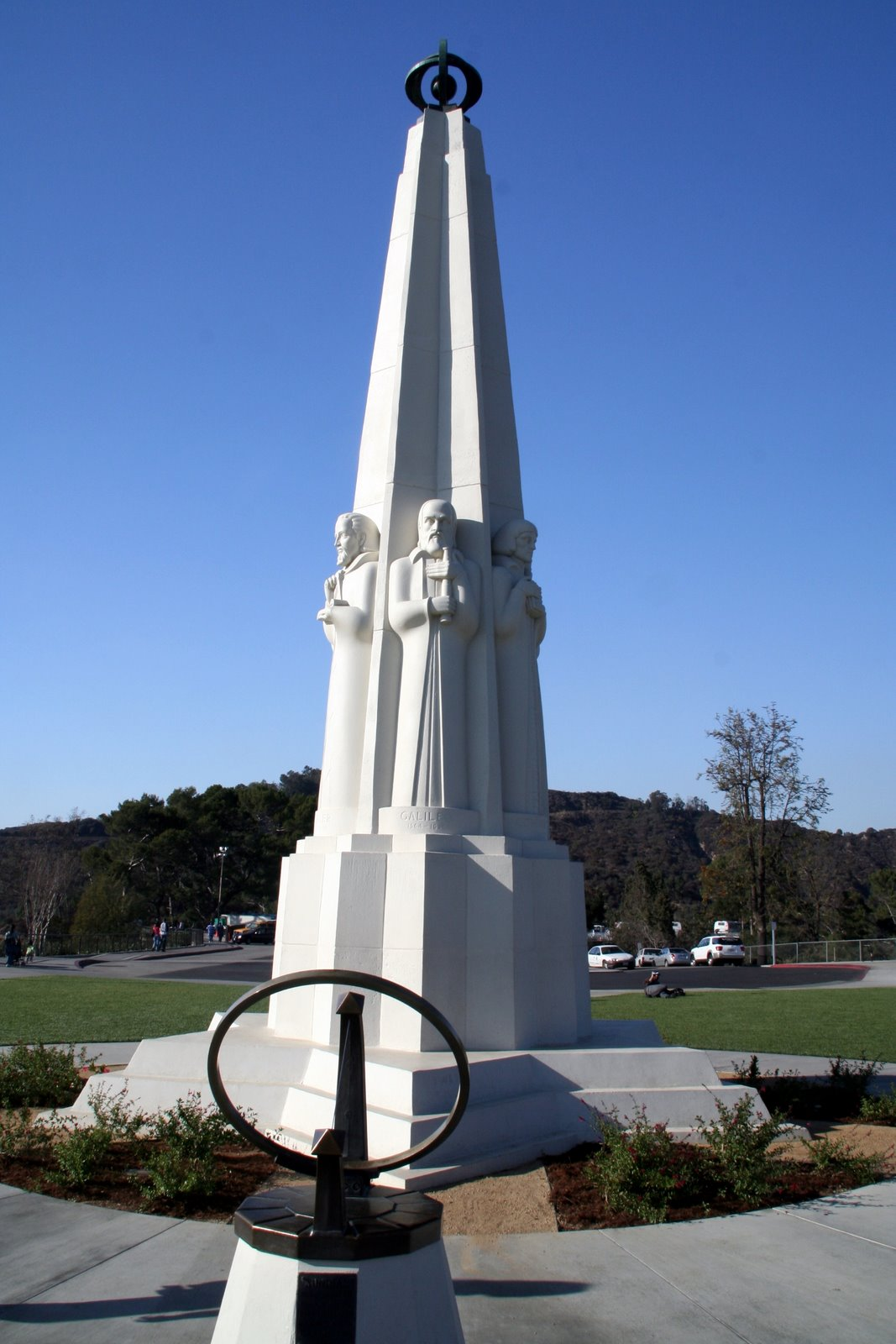
Astronomers Monument, located to the Observatory's north

The Astronomers Monument on the front lawn of the Observatory that pays homage to six of the greatest astronomers of all time: Hipparchus (c. 190 – c. 120 BC); Nicolaus Copernicus (1473–1543); Galileo Galilei (1564–1642); Johannes Kepler (1571–1630); Isaac Newton (1642–1727); and William Herschel (1738–1822). The 1934 New Deal artwork, which was a collaboration between six local artists, is topped with an armillary sphere.

== Visiting ==
Admission to the building and grounds of Griffith Observatory is free of charge. Planetarium shows at the Observatory are offered eight times a day on weekdays and ten times a day on weekends. A nominal fee is charged for admission to the planetarium shows. As long as the weather permits, the Observatory offers free public telescope viewing every night the observatory is open. This includes the historic 12" Zeiss Refracting Telescope on the roof, and up to four portable telescopes placed outside offering views of visible celestial objects for the night. In poor weather, the roof may be closed to the public, but if still accessible under overcast skies, the Zeiss Telescope can still be visited as an exhibit during viewing hours.

When parking at the Greek Theater parking lot on nights there are no concerts, visitors can choose to take trails up to the observatory (primarily by using the sidewalk along the road that leads up to the observatory) or by taking the bus that runs up the road and drops visitors off right outside the observatory grounds. The observatory is closed on Mondays.

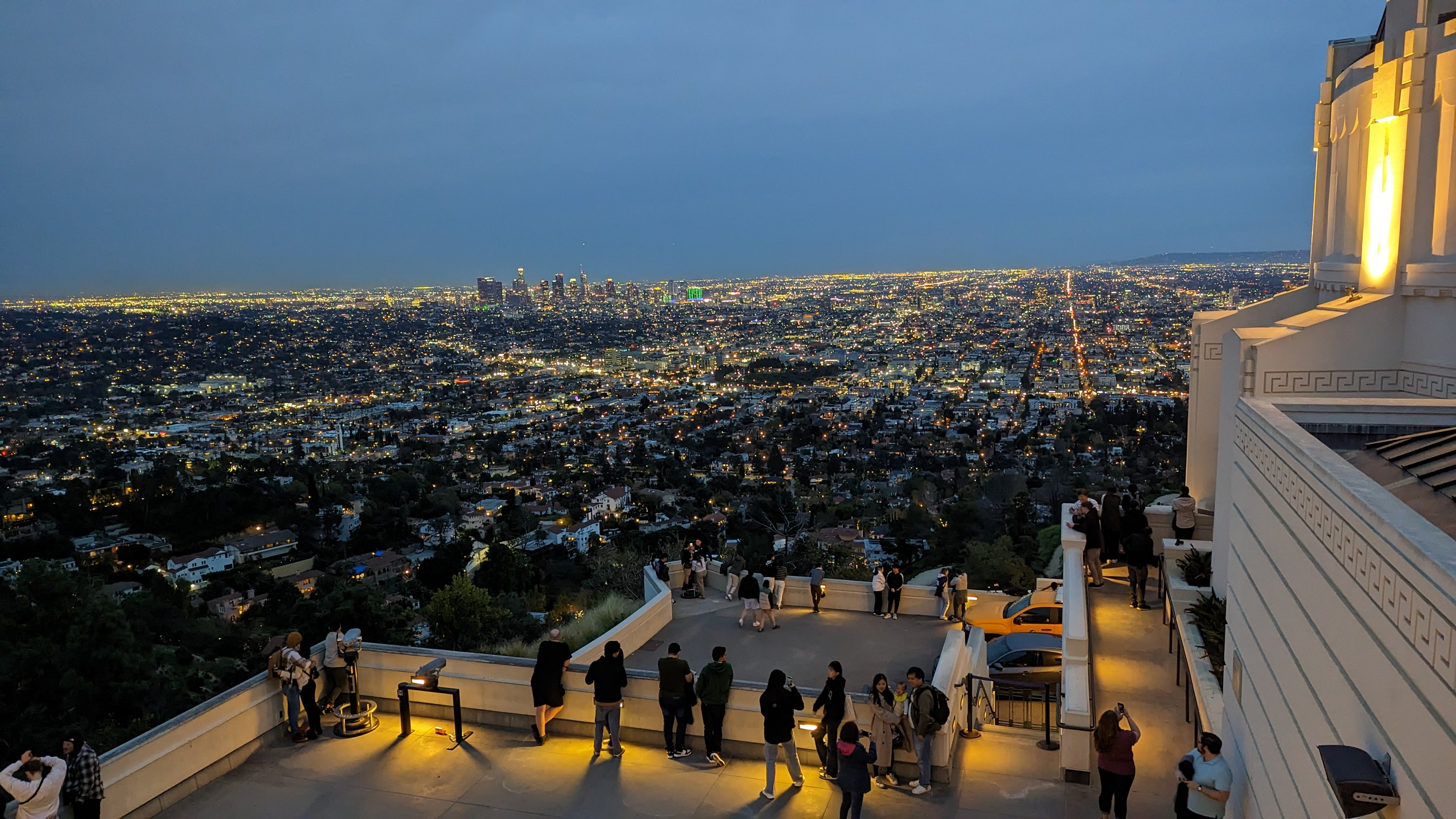
Los Angeles skyline from Griffith Observatory at night

There are photo opportunities and scenery at and around the Observatory, with views of the Pacific Ocean, the Hollywood Sign and Downtown Los Angeles.

== In popular culture ==
The observatory was featured twice in Rebel Without a Cause (1955), both of which helped make it an international emblem of Los Angeles. A bust of the film's star James Dean was subsequently placed at the west side of the grounds.

The observatory has also appeared in the following:

=== Film ===
- The Phantom Empire (1935)
- Dick Tracy Returns (1938)
- Phantom from Space (1953)
- Tobor the Great (1954)
- Teen-Age Crime Wave (1955)
- War of the Colossal Beast (1958)
- The Cosmic Man (1959)
- The Spy with My Face (1964)
- The Split (1968)
- Flesh Gordon (1974)
- Midnight Madness (1980)
- The Terminator (1984)
- Back to the Future (1985)
- Dragnet (1987)
- Earth Girls Are Easy (1988)
- Back to the Future Part II (1989)
- The Rocketeer (1991)
- The Pagemaster (1994)
- Devil in a Blue Dress (1995)
- The Power Within (1995)
- The People vs. Larry Flynt (1996)
- The End of Violence (1997)
- Bowfinger (1999)
- House on Haunted Hill (1999)
- Queen of the Damned (2002)
- Charlie's Angels: Full Throttle (2003)
- Transformers (2007)
- Yes Man (2008)
- Terminator Salvation (2009)
- Valentine's Day (2010)
- Friends with Benefits (2011)
- Love and Mercy (2014)
- McFarland, USA (2015)
- San Andreas (2015)
- Terminator Genisys (2015)
- La La Land (2016)
- Sandy Wexler (2017)
- Under the Silver Lake (2018)
- Hotel Artemis (2018)
- Moonfall (2022)
- Elvis (2022)
- Family Switch (2023)

Additionally, the tunnel entrance to the Observatory was featured in Who Framed Roger Rabbit (1988)

=== Television ===
- 24, "Day 1 3:00–4:00 pm" (2001)
- 90210
- Adele One Night Only (2021)
- Adventures of Superman, Pilot
- Alias, "The Coup"
- Agent Carter, "A View in the Dark" (2016)
- The Amazing Race, 22nd season
- Angel, "Are You Now or Have You Ever Been"
- Angie Tribeca, "Irrational Treasures"
- Archer, "Archer Dreamland: Sleepers Wake"
- Beverly Hills, 90210, "Rebel with a Cause"
- BoJack Horseman, "The Telescope", "Later", "That's Too Much, Man!”, "A Horse Walks into Rehab", "Nice While It Lasted” and Season 6's opening credits
- Buffy the Vampire Slayer, "Shadow"
- Brothers and Sisters, "The Road Ahead"
- Cannon, "Vengeance" (1975)
- CHiPs
- Criminal Minds, "Nanny Dearest"
- Dancing with the Stars, Season 23 opening
- Dragnet, "The LSD Story" aka "Blueboy"
- Episodes
- Fallout, "The Beginning"
- Goliath, season 2, episode 8
- Honey West, "The Abominable Snowman"
- Hunter, "City Under Siege Part Three"
- In the Heat of the Night, "Just a Country Boy"
- Jonas, "Date Expectations"
- Keeping up with the Kardashians
- The Late Late Show with Craig Ferguson, opening title sequence (2009-2015)
- Logan's Run, "Futurepast" (1978)
- Lucifer, "Once Upon a Time"
- MacGyver, Pilot
- Macross Frontier
- The Man from U.N.C.L.E., "The Double Affair" (1964)
- Melrose Place, "Till Death Do Us Part"
- Millionaire Matchmaker
- Mission: Impossible Pilot and two subsequent episodes (1966)
- The Monkees
- Moonlight
- The Muppets Mayhem, "Drift Away"
- The New Adventures of Wonder Woman, "Time Bomb" (1979)
- Perry Mason, Season 2, Episode 4 (2023)
- Quantum Leap, "Goodbye Norma Jean"
- Remington Steele
- The Rookie, "Poetic Justice"
- Rocky Jones, Space Ranger
- She-Hulk: Attorney at Law, Pilot
- Star Trek: Voyager, "Future's End"
- Top Chef, 17th season opening
- The Wonder Years

=== Music and music videos ===
- "Observatory Crest", Captain Beefheart and The Magic Band (1974)
- "Rush Rush", Paula Abdul
- "To Live & Die in L.A.", 2Pac
- Beatles Anthology interviews (mid-1990s)
- 2010 MTV Video Music Awards, Linkin Park (2010)
- Untitled album image, The Byrds (1970)

=== Video games ===
- Grand Theft Auto V
- Grand Theft Auto: San Andreas
- Horizon Forbidden West (2023)
- Mafia II
- Vampire: The Masquerade – Bloodlines
- Donut County
- Command & Conquer: Red Alert 3

=== Other ===
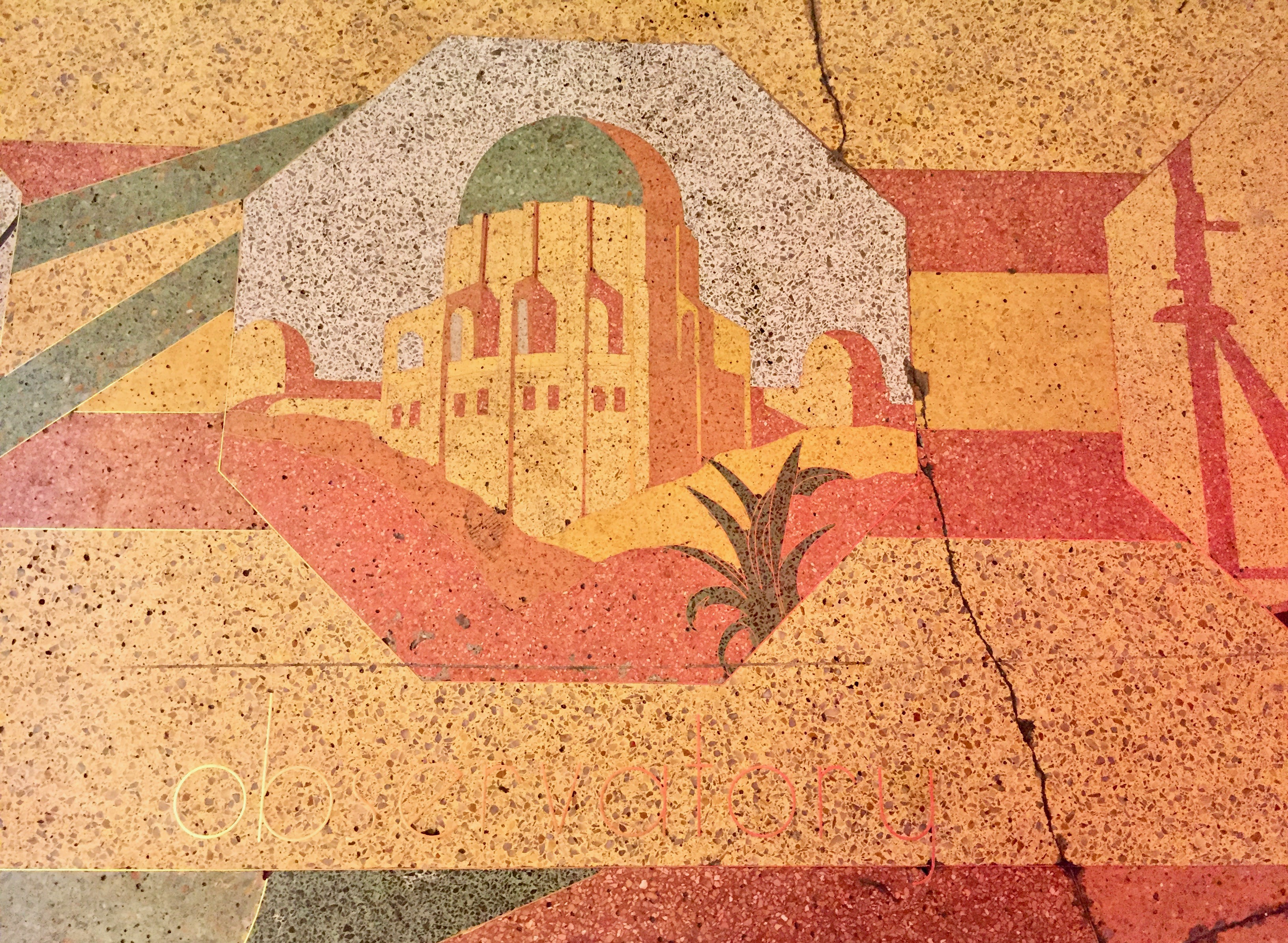
The Observatory depicted in terrazzo in front of Clifton's Cafeteria

- Runaways comic
- Bill Griffith's one-shot magazine-format "one-pager" treatment collection
- Windows 10 splash screen (2010)
- The sidewalk outside Clifton's Cafeteria

== See also ==
- Don Dixon – Observatory Art Director
- Joy Picus, Los Angeles City Council member, 1977–1991, president of Friends of Griffith Observatory
- Laura Danly – Observatory Curator
- Los Angeles Historic–Cultural Monuments in Hollywood and Los Feliz
- Fabra Observatory – Spanish observatory on a hill overlooking a metropolis
