= Clarence Hinkle =

American painter (1880–1960)

- Born: June 19, 1880; Auburn, California, U.S.
- Died: July 21, 1960 (aged 80); Santa Barbara, California, U.S.
- Education: San Francisco Art Institute; Art Students League of New York; Pennsylvania Academy of the Fine Arts; Académie Julian
- Occupations: Painter, educator
- Movement: Post-Impressionism
- Spouse: Mabel Bain Hinkle

Clarence Keiser Hinkle (June 19, 1880–July 21, 1960), was an American painter and art educator. His art studio was in Laguna Beach, California, and later in Santa Barbara, California. He was known for his still life and portrait paintings.

== Early life and education ==
Clarence Keiser Hinkle was born on June 19, 1880 in Auburn, California. At age 18 he studied at Crocker Art Gallery, under painter William Franklin Jackson.

By 1900, he moved to San Francisco to study at San Francisco Art Institute (then known as California School of Design) with Arthur Frank Mathews. From 1901 until 1903, he enrolled in the Art Students League of New York and studied under John Twachtman and William Merritt Chase. From 1904 until 1906, he studied at Pennsylvania Academy of the Fine Arts in Philadelphia.

In May 1906, he was awarded the Cresson Scholarship, a traveling scholarship to Paris for two years of travel, and he studied at the Académie Julian. While studying in Paris, Hinkle was influenced by Impressionism and Pointillism.

== Career ==
From 1912 until 1917, Hinkle lived in San Francisco. He moved to Los Angeles in 1917 and taught at Louise Elizabeth Garden MacLeod's Los Angeles School of Art and Design. Hinkle later taught painting and drawing at the Chouinard Art Institute, from 1921 until 1935. His students included Millard Sheets and Phil Dike, among others. He taught his students to experiment with their work, paint from nature, and use loose brushstrokes to capture the subject. Hinkle had a wife, Mabel Bain and she had been a former student.

He had an art studio in Laguna Beach, California from 1922 to 1935, and he was a member of the Laguna Beach Art Association. Hinkle opened another studio in Santa Barbara, California in 1935. He painted landscapes, still lifes and portraits. Hinkle painted many coastal landscapes in the 1920s. Initially while living in California Hinkle worked within Impressionist style, but eventually moved in to more of an expressionistic modernist style, he is also associated with Post-Impressionism. Other early-Modernist in California include Rinaldo Cuneo, Ray Strong, and Charles Reiffel.

Hinkle was a member of the Group of Eight, alongside artists Edouard Vysekal, Luvena Buchanan Vysekal, John Hubbard Rich, Henri De Kruif, Donna N. Schuster, E. Roscoe Shrader, and Mabel Alvarez. This Group of Eight was organized largely by Luvena Buchanan Vyeskal and Edouard Vyeskal, and the group had a basis in the progressive art movement in California.

== Death and legacy ==
He died on July 21, 1960, in Santa Barbara, at age 80.

His wife Mabel donated one of his paintings to the Smithsonian American Art Museum posthumously. More than a hundred of Hinkle's paintings were left by his estate to the University of Pacific, which were sold in 1986 to a single collector in Santa Barbara. His work was acquired by the San Diego Museum of Art, the Santa Barbara Museum of Art, the De Young Museum in San Francisco, and the Los Angeles County Museum of Art.

In 2012, more than 114 of his paintings were exhibited at the Laguna Art Museum.

== Exhibitions ==
This is a select list of notable exhibitions that featured Hinkle.

=== Solo exhibitions ===
- 1960 – Clarence Hinkle: 1880-1960, solo exhibition, Santa Barbara Museum of Art, Santa Barbara, California
- 2012 – Clarence Hinkle, solo exhibition at Laguna Art Museum, Laguna Beach, California

=== Group exhibitions ===
- 1922 – group exhibition with Hinkle, Edward Weston, Margrethe Mather, Howard Russell Butler, Jean Mannheim, Henri De Kruif, John Hubbard Rich, John Wesley Cotton, Howell Chambers Brown, Nellie Huntington Gere, at the MacDowell Club, Tajo Building, Los Angeles, California
- 1933–1934 – Painting and Sculpture from 16 American Cities, group exhibition, Museum of Modern Art (MoMA), New York City, New York
- 1962 – Clarence Hinkle and William Rohrbach, group exhibition, Esther Bear Gallery, Santa Barbara, California
- 2004 – Laguna Beach: Our Town in the Early 1900s, group exhibition with Hinkle, William Wendt, Joseph Kleitsch, Edgar Alwin Payne, Anna Althea Hills, at Laguna Art Museum, Laguna Beach, California
- 2012 – Modern Spirit and the Group of Eight, group exhibition with Hinkle, Mabel Alvarez, Henri de Kruif, John Hubbard Rich, Donna N. Schuster, E. Roscoe Shrader, Edouard Vysekal, Luvena Buchanan Vysekal, at Laguna Art Museum, Laguna Beach, California
