= William Jackson =

William Jackson may refer to:

== Arts and entertainment ==
- William Jackson (organist born 1730) (1730–1803), referred to as Jackson of Exeter, English organist and composer
- William Jackson of Masham (1815–1866), English organist and composer
- William Henry Jackson (1843–1942), early photographer of the American West
- William Jackson (Scottish composer) (born 1955), Scottish composer
- William F. Jackson (1850–1936), American painter and art curator
- Will E. Jackson (William Edward Jackson III, 1945–2019), Greenpeace activist and musician
- Will Jackson (Wentworth) (William Jackson), a character from the TV series Wentworth

== Business ==
- William Jackson (businessman) (born 1963), British businessman and philanthropist, founder of Bridgepoint Group
- William Jackson Food Group, food manufacturer in the United Kingdom

== Military ==
- William Jackson (pirate) (fl. 1639–1645), British pirate
- William Lowther Jackson (1825–1890), American Confederate general
- William Hicks Jackson (1835–1903), American Confederate general
- William Payne Jackson (1868–1945), U.S. Army general
- William Jackson (Australian soldier) (1897–1959), Australian recipient of the Victoria Cross
- Sir William Jackson (British Army officer) (1917–1999), British general, governor of Gibraltar, military historian, and author
- William Francis Jackson (1886–1964), British Army officer
- Honoré Jackson (William Henry Jackson, 1861–1952), leader of the North-West Rebellion in Canada, 1885

== Politics and law ==
=== United Kingdom ===
- William Jackson (fl. 1601–1604), member of parliament (MP) for Guildford and Haslemere
- Sir William Jackson, 1st Baronet (1805–1876), British MP for Newcastle-under-Lyme and Derbyshire North
- William Jackson, 1st Baron Allerton (1840–1917), English politician, MP for Leeds
- William Jackson, 1st Baron Jackson (1893–1954), MP for Brecon and Radnorshire, 1939–1945

=== United States ===
- William Jackson (secretary) (1759–1828), secretary to the Philadelphia Convention and member of the U.S. Continental Army
- William Jackson (Massachusetts politician, born 1783) (1783–1855), US congressman from Massachusetts
- William Terry Jackson (1794–1882), U.S. representative from New York
- William Jackson (Saugus, Massachusetts), English-American pottery manufacturer and politician of the 1820s
- William A. Jackson (spy), Black dispatches spy during the American Civil War
- William Humphreys Jackson (1839–1915), congressman from Maryland
- William P. Jackson (1868–1939), member of the United States Senate from Maryland
- William S. Jackson (died 1932), New York State attorney general, 1907–1908
- William T. Jackson (Ohio politician) (1876–1933), mayor of Toledo, Ohio
- William Harding Jackson (1901–1971), United States national security advisor
- William H. Jackson (judge) (1864–1938), judge of the United States District Court for the Canal Zone
- William M. Jackson (judge) (born 1953), associate judge on the Superior Court of the District of Columbia
- William S. Jackson (judge) (1889–1981), associate justice of the Colorado Supreme Court
- Bill Jackson (politician) (William S. Jackson, born 1932), U.S. state senator from Georgia

=== Other political figures ===
- William Jackson (New Zealand politician) (1832–1889), New Zealand politician
- William Jackson (Canadian politician) (1858–1938), Canadian member of parliament
- William Jackson (Canadian administrator)
- Willie Jackson (politician) (William Wakatere Jackson, born 1961), New Zealand broadcaster and member of parliament

== Religion ==
- William Jackson (journalist) (1737–1795), Irish preacher, journalist, playwright, radical, and spy
- William Jackson (bishop) (1751–1815), bishop of Oxford
- William Jackson (priest, died 1878) (1792–1878), priest and academic, archdeacon of Carlisle
- William Jackson (priest, died 1885), Anglican priest in Ireland, dean of Killala
- William Walrond Jackson (1811–1895), bishop of Antigua 1860–1879
- William Jackson (priest, died 1903), archdeacon of Killala
- William Jackson (priest, died 1931) (1838–1931), rector of Exeter College, Oxford
- Ernest Jackson (priest) (William Ernest Jackson), 20th century Canadian Anglican priest
- William Henry Jackson (priest) (1889–1931), Anglican priest, missionary, and inventor of Burmese Braille
- William Jackson (minister) (1818–1900), American abolitionist, Underground Railroad agent, Baptist minister, and Union army chaplain

== Science and medicine ==
- William Jackson (engineer) (1848–1910), Boston, Massachusetts city engineer, 1885–1910
- William Jackson (inventor) (1849–1915), Scottish mechanical engineer
- William Elvin Jackson (1904–1972), American aviation electronics engineer
- William M. Jackson (chemist) (born 1936), American researcher

== Sports ==
- William Jackson (curler) (1871–1955), Scottish winner of the first Olympic gold medal in curling, Chamonix, 1924
- William Jackson (footballer) (1876–1954), Newton Heath F.C., Burnley F.C. and Wales international footballer
- Bill Jackson (first baseman) (William Riley Jackson, 1881–1958), American first baseman for the Chicago Whales
- William Jackson (pitcher) (fl. 1890–1906), American pitcher and outfielder for early minor leagues and Negro leagues
- William Jackson III (born 1992), American football player
- Bill Jackson (Australian footballer) (William Charles Jackson, 1874–1921), Australian rules footballer
- Bill Jackson (footballer, born 1894) (William Hickin Jackson, 1894–1917), English footballer
- Bill Jackson (American football) (William Steven Jackson, born 1960), former professional American football defensive back
- Bill Jackson (bowls) (William J. R. Jackson, born 1915), Rhodesian lawn bowler
- Billy Jackson (bowls) (William Jackson, born 1970), English bowls player
- Billy Jackson (footballer) (William Jackson, 1902–1974), English footballer
- Bill Jackson (basketball) (William Jackson, 1918–1985), Irish basketball and GAA player
- Willie Jackson (footballer) (William Kennedy Jackson , 1900–1986), Scottish footballer
- William Jackson (cricketer) (1820–?), English cricketer

== Others ==
- William Jackson (Boston loyalist) (1731–1810), American Revolutionary era loyalist
- William Jackson (gangster) (1901–1961), American loan shark, enforcer and murder victim
- William A. Jackson (bibliographer) (1905–1964), American bibliographer and librarian
- William K. Jackson (1913–2003), American architect, co-founder of KBJ Architects
- William Turrentine Jackson (1915–2000), American professor of history
- William Perry Jackson (born 1955), American serial killer
- William Henry Jackson (colonial administrator) (c. 1860–1920), British colonial administrator

== See also ==
- Bill Jackson (disambiguation)
- Willie Jackson (disambiguation)
- Will Jackson (disambiguation)
