= Henri De Kruif =

American visual artist (1882–1944)

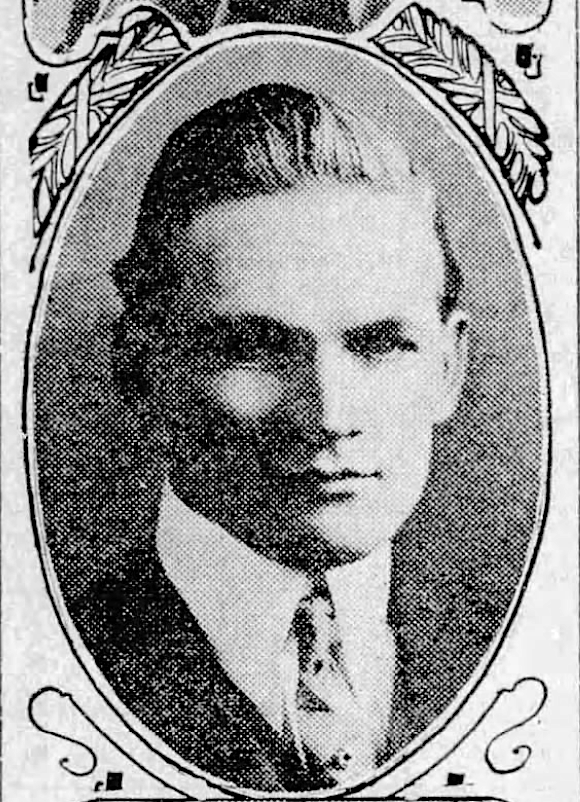
- Henri De Kruif (1914)
- Born: Henri Gilbert DeKruif; February 17, 1882; Grand Rapids, Michigan, U.S.
- Died: July 7, 1944 (aged 62); Los Angeles, California, U.S.
- Resting place: Pilgrim Home Cemetery, Holland, Michigan, U.S.
- Other name: Henry Gilbert De Kruif
- Education: School of the Art Institute of Chicago, Art Students League of New York, Hope College
- Occupations: Visual artists, commercial artist, art theorist
- Known for: Painter, watercolorist, engravings, lithography, portrait paintings, landscape paintings, illustrator
- Movement: California Impressionism
- Spouse(s): Xarifa Hamilton Towner (m. 1916–1918; her death); Muriel Earle (m. 1922–1944; his death)

Henri Gilbert De Kruif (February 17, 1882 – July 7, 1944) was an American visual artist, and commercial artist. He was known for his work as a painter, printmaker, and illustrator. For the majority of his career he lived in Laguna Beach, California, and Los Angeles, and worked within the California Impressionism movement.

== Early life and education ==
Henri Gilbert De Kruif was born on February 17, 1882, in Grand Rapids, Michigan.

He studied at the School of the Art Institute of Chicago, under John Vanderpoel; at the Frank Holmes School of Illustration in Chicago; at the Art Students League of New York, under Frank DuMond, F. Luis Mora, and C. C. Beall; and the Hope College in Holland, Michigan. In Los Angeles, De Kruif studied under Stanton MacDonald-Wright.

== Career ==
De Kruif worked at the Grand Rapids Advertising Company. In 1911, he moved to Los Angeles, initially working at Merrill Advertising Company as a commercial artist. In 1914, he worked as a manager at Moore Advertising.

He was a member of the California Art Club (CAC) in Los Angeles; and a member of the Group of Eight, alongside artists Edouard Vysekal, Luvena Buchanan Vysekal, John Hubbard Rich, Clarence Hinkle, Donna N. Schuster, E. Roscoe Shrader, and Mabel Alvarez. The Group of Eight was organized by Luvena Buchanan Vyeskal and Edouard Vyeskal, and had a basis in the progressive art movement in California.

== Death and legacy ==
De Kruif died of an illness on July 7, 1944, in Los Angeles.

His artwork can be found in museum collections, including at the Springville Museum of Art in Springville, Utah; the Los Angeles County Museum of Art; and Smithsonian American Art Museum in Washington, D.C.

== Personal life ==
De Kruif was married in 1916 to artist Xarifa Hamilton Towner, however she died two years later from pneumonia. In 1922, he married Muriel Earle.
