= Mabel Alvarez =

American artist (1891–1985)

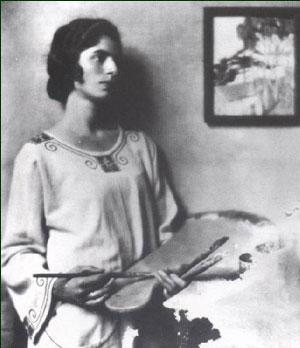
- Self Portrait, Mabel Alvarez, 1923
- Born: November 28, 1891; Oahu, Kingdom of Hawai'i
- Died: March 13, 1985 (aged 93); Los Angeles, California, U.S.
- Education: School for Illustration and Painting
- Known for: Painting

Mabel Alvarez (November 28, 1891 – March 13, 1985) was an American painter. Her works, often introspective and spiritual in nature, and her style is considered a contributing factor to the Southern California Modernism and California Impressionism movement.

== Life ==
She was born to a prominent Spanish family who lived on the island of Oahu, Hawaii. Her father, Luis F. Álvarez, a medical doctor, was involved with the leprosy research begun by the legendary Father Damien. Her brother, Walter C. Alvarez, would later distinguish himself as a physician and author. Her nephew Luis Alvarez (son of Walter), was a Nobel Prize winner in physics. The family moved to Los Angeles, California when Alvarez was a youth.

Alvarez demonstrated artistic talent at a young age and 1915 enrolled in the Art Students League of Los Angeles, where she enjoyed immediate success. She painted a large mural for the Panama–California Exposition San Diego, for which she won a Gold Medal. Alvarez attended William Cahill’s School for Illustration and Painting in Los Angeles and drew a charcoal portrait of a woman in profile used by the School for its catalog cover.

Portrait of Herman Kalahele by Mabel Alvarez, oil on board, 1939

Her first portrait painting was displayed at the Los Angeles Museum (now the Los Angeles County Museum of Art) in 1917, a museum with which she continued a close relationship until her death. As a young woman, she was influenced by the philosophical writings of Will Levington Comfort, who espoused principles of Theosophy and Eastern mysticism.

At an exhibition in 1919 Alvarez won third Black prize for her rendering of a child's head entitled "Carmen." In 1923 she won a prize for best figure-painting for her work Self-Portrait in the spring exhibition at the Los Angeles Museum.

In the 1920s and 30s, her works were heavily influenced by the Synchromist Movement’s Stanton Macdonald-Wright and Morgan Russell, who would remain her teacher for over 20 years. These early paintings based on her interest in Symbolism, Art Nouveau and Impressionism. In 1922 she became a member of the Group of Eight, along with Clarence Hinkle, Henri De Kruif, John Hubbard Rich, Donna N. Schuster, E. Roscoe Shrader, Edouard Vysekal, and Luvena Buchanan Vysekal. This Group of Eight was organized largely by Luvena Buchanan Vyeskal and Edouard Vyeskal, and the group had a basis in the progressive art movement in California.

In August 1941 she had a one-woman exhibit in the Los Angeles county museum that featured paintings of bold color she created while she was staying in Honolulu. There was evidence of her stay in Hawaii because many of her paintings featured different aspects that one would find in island life, like the dress, food and plants. Specifically, one of the features of this exhibit was a large still life that depicted a fruit on a table.

In 2001 her work was exhibited at Mission San Juan Capistrano in California, U.S.

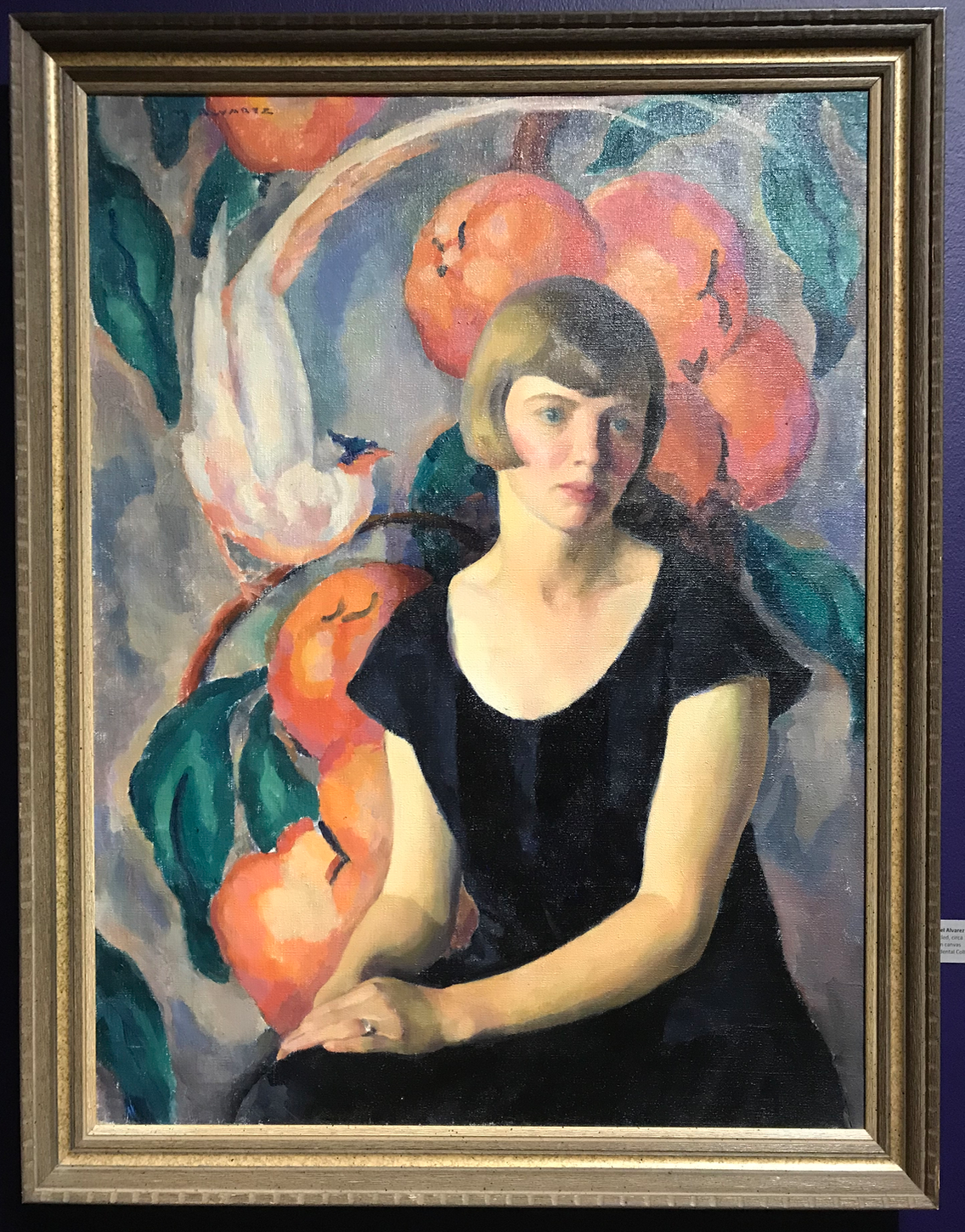
Untitled, c. 1940, by Mabel Alvarez

The primary color that Alvarez used to express herself was green which to her represented joy, love, hope, youth and mirth. These colors were played out on a stage of canvasses in the forms of universal ideals and archetypes: the child, the innocent maiden, the temptress, the faithful wife, the spiritual seeker, the earthbound spirit in limbo, and the liberated spirit that has transcended Earth's constraints.

Alvarez painted into her sixties and seventies. Her works included Impressionism, as well as to figure, still-life, and portrait painting. Her late pieces are focused on religious and symbolic themes.

The later years of her life were spent in a retirement apartment and then in a nursing home. She died on March 13, 1985, at the age of ninety-three in Los Angeles.

== Notable collections ==
- Honolulu Museum of Art, Honolulu, Hawaii
- San Diego Museum of Art, San Diego, California
