= George Stanley (disambiguation) =

George Stanley (1907–2002) was a Canadian historian and designer of the Canadian flag.

George Stanley may also refer to:

- George Stanley (15th century MP), Member of Parliament (MP) for Lancashire
- Gjura Stojana, also known as George Stanley, (1885-1974), modernist painter from Los Angeles
- George Stanley (poet) (born 1934), American-Canadian poet
- George Stanley, 9th Baron Strange (1460–1503), English nobleman and statesman
- George Douglas Stanley (1876–1954), Canadian politician and physician
- George Stanley (British politician) (1872–1938), British soldier and politician
- George Stanley (sculptor) (1903–1973), American sculptor and art teacher
- George E. Stanley (1884–1949), British motorcyclist
- George Stanley (footballer) (1909–1982), Australian rules footballer
- George Edward Stanley (1942–2011), author of short stories
