= Vysekal =

Vysekal is a surname. Notable people with the surname include:

- Edouard Vysekal (1890–1939), American painter and art educator
- Luvena Vysekal (1873–1954), American painter
