= Bill Jackson =

Bill Jackson or Billy Jackson may refer to:

== Sports ==
- Bill Jackson (first baseman) (1881–1958), professional baseball player, 1914–1915
- Bill Jackson (pitcher) (fl. 1890–1906), pitcher and outfielder for early minor leagues and Negro leagues
- Billy Jackson (boxer), British boxer
- Bill Jackson (Australian footballer) (1874–1921), Australian rules footballer
- Bill Jackson (footballer, born 1894) (1894–1917), English footballer
- Bill Jackson (American football) (born 1960), former professional American football defensive back
- Billy Jackson (American football) (born 1959), former professional American football running back
- Bill Jackson (bowls) (born 1915), Rhodesian lawn bowler
- Billy Jackson (bowls) (born 1970), English bowls player
- Billy Jackson (footballer) (1902–1974), English footballer
- Bill Jackson (basketball) (1918–1985), Irish basketball and GAA player

== Other ==
- Billy Morrow Jackson (1926–2006), American painter
- Bill Jackson (politician) (born 1932), U.S. state senator from Georgia
- Bill Jackson (television personality) (1935–2022), American television personality, cartoonist, and educator
- Billie Jackson, EastEnders character, also called Billy Jackson

== See also ==
- William Jackson (disambiguation)
- Will Jackson (disambiguation)
