= King's School, Macclesfield =

Private school in Macclesfield, Cheshire, United Kingdom

The King's School
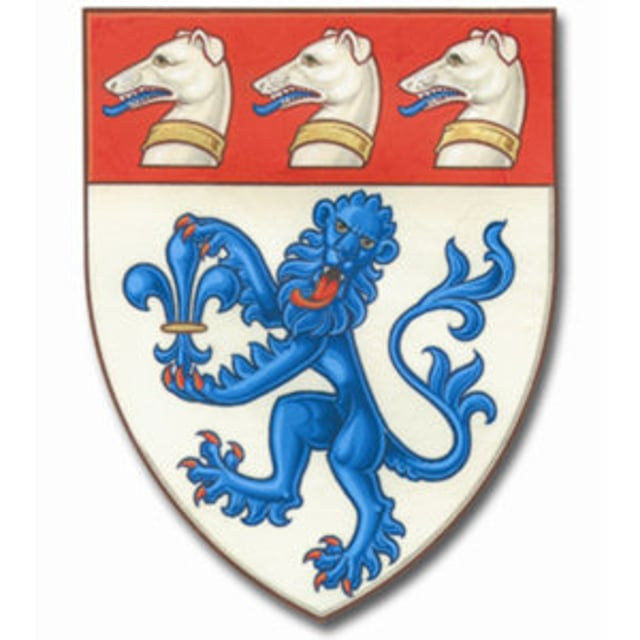

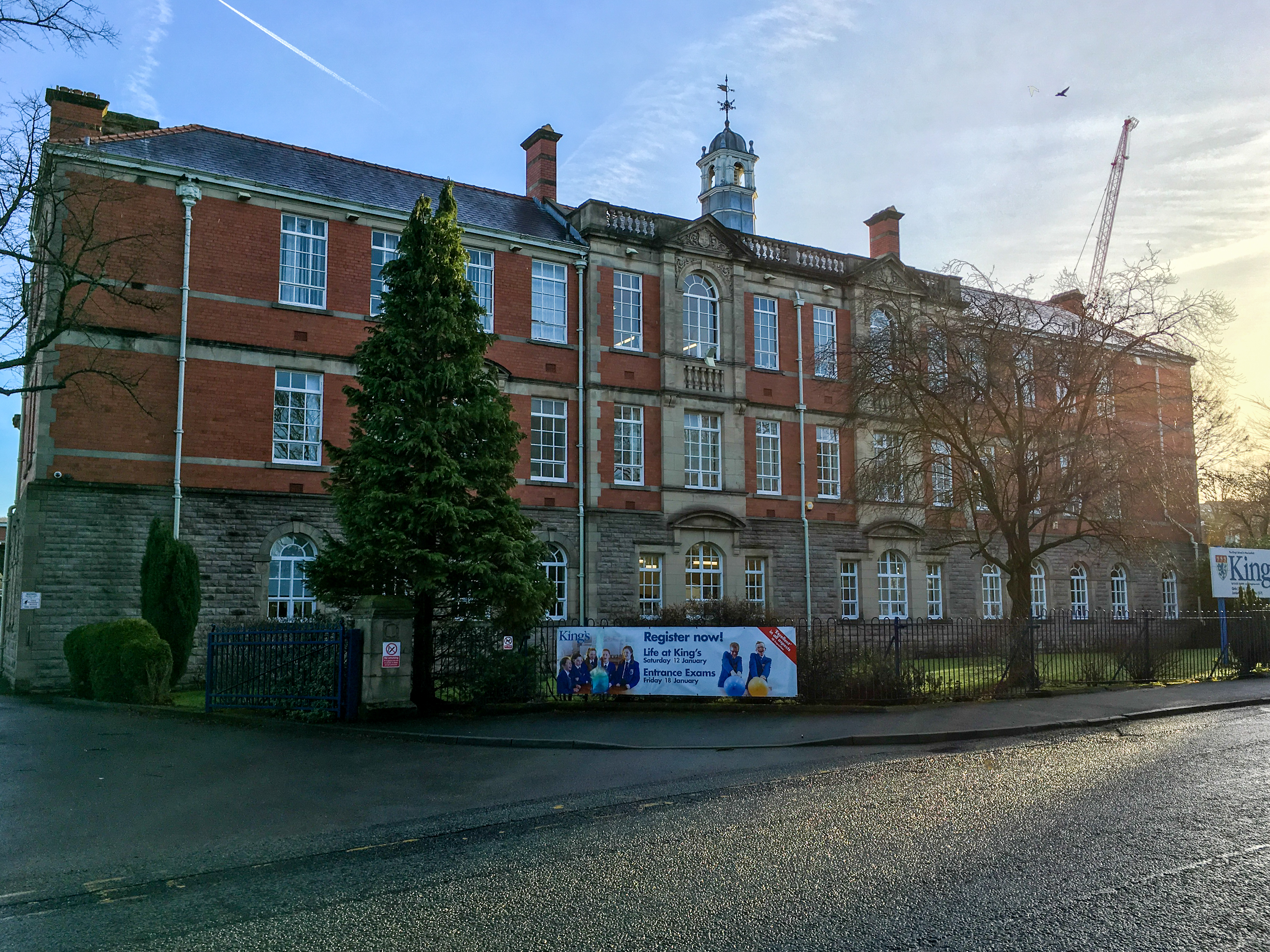
- Former site of The Kings School Macclesfield for Girls in Macclesfield

Location
- Alderley Rd, Prestbury; Prestbury, Cheshire, SK10 4SP; United Kingdom; 53.2763°N 2.16435°W

Information
- Type: Private day school
- Motto: Challenge, Develop, Foster, Support
- Established: 1502; 524 years ago
- Founder: Sir John Percyvale, Feoffees
- Department for Education URN: 111473 Tables
- Head of Foundation: Jason Slack
- Gender: Co-educational
- Age: 3 to 18
- Enrolment: 1,337 pupils
- Houses: 4 (Gawsworth, Adlington, Tatton and Capesthorne)
- Colour
- Website: kingsmac.co.uk

The King's School, Macclesfield, is an all through co-educational private day school in Prestbury, Cheshire, England, and a member of the Headmasters' and Headmistresses' Conference. It was founded in 1502 by Sir John Percyvale, a former Lord Mayor of London, as Macclesfield Grammar School.

== History ==
The King's School was founded in 1502 within the Church of St Michael and All Angels, Macclesfield. It was re-founded by Edward VI in 1552 as the "Free Grammar School of King Edward VI". It moved to Cumberland Street, 300 metres further from the town square, in 1844.

In 1844 a Modern School, with a more commercial and technical curriculum, was built by the governors to run in tandem with the Grammar School. It merged with the Grammar School in 1912. In the 1880s, a High School for Girls had been established in Macclesfield. The site of the girls' high school, which by then had closed, was acquired by King's School in 1992 and opened as a Girls' Division of the King's school.

The school operated as a direct-grant school and offered scholarships for boys from state elementary schools from 1926 until 1966, when its application to continue as a direct grant grammar school was refused and it became fully independent.

The boys' junior school was opened in 1947. In 1993, girls from age 11 to 16 were admitted and housed with co-educational juniors, and later infants, at the old Macclesfield High School site on Fence Avenue. The Sixth Form had been co-educational since 1986.

In July 2020, the school moved to a new location adjacent to its long-held Derby Playing Fields, on the outskirts of Macclesfield. The King's School's 2020 development plans involved closing the two existing school sites in Macclesfield and opening a new single site school in Prestbury, near Macclesfield. The development plans involved selling off the two existing school sites for housing development to fund the new school site. The school acquired greenbelt farmland adjacent to its Derby Fields site for which it subsequently sought planning permission in order to develop the existing school site and the farmland for housing. Planning permission was granted to the school to build more than 250 houses on the greenbelt land in Macclesfield in July 2016. The new school was built on green belt land in nearby Prestbury. Planning permission for all sites was confirmed when the Secretary of State declined to call in the plans for further scrutiny in September 2016. In July 2020, King's School left Macclesfield after more than 500 years of continuous operation in the town and relocated to Prestbury. In 2024, after 500 years of teaching Latin, King’s school controversially withdrew Latin from its curriculum. This led to parents making a formal complaint to an independent body regarding this decision and the lack of transparent decision making by the school’s governing body.

== Academia ==
The school follows the National Curriculum for GCSE in Years 10–11 and A-Levels in the sixth form. In 2012, pupils achieved A*/A in 41% of all exams and A* – B in three-quarters of exams. Pupils achieved the best-ever GCSE results in 2012 with 33% of grades at A* grade, more than 63% of grades at A*/A and 86% at A* – B grade.

In 2011, pupils achieved 75% A* to B grade at A-level, with a 99.7% pass rate, and 60% As and A*s at GCSE.

In 2023, pupils achieved at GCSE level 43% of all grades at 9/8 (A*), 65% grades 9-7, 83% 9-6. For A-Levels, 48% of all grades were A*/A, 80% of all grades were A*-B, with 7 students getting 3 A*s.

== Extra-curricular activities ==
=== Music ===
In 2003 the school's Foundation Choir won BBC Songs of Praise Choir of the Year. It takes bi-annual trips to perform across Europe, having visited Barcelona, Levico Terme, Strasbourg, Lake Geneva and Budapest. In 2016 the choir performed in Prague. The choir and numerous bands also perform at nearby St Michael's Church. The school's music department is equipped with a recording studio and practice rooms and offers instrumental lessons to the students. The department also performs musicals such as The Revenge of Sherlock Holmes, a West End musical, in 2012.

=== Drama ===
The school performs two to three plays a year; one by the Boys' Division/Sixth Form, one by the Girls' Division, and one by the Juniors. Recent plays include Cinders, Arabian Nights, and The Ramayana. Now that the school is completely co-educational, there are performances in Infants, Junior divisions respectively and the Seniors and Sixth Form perform together. In 2023, they performed Bleak Expectations. In 2024, they performed Guys and Dolls.

=== School trips ===
Trips abroad are arranged by individual departments, including those by the History and Classics departments, in addition to annual foreign language exchange visits. Pupils are involved in biennial World Challenge Expeditions and recent expeditions have been to Morocco, Ecuador, India and most recently Namibia.

The school's Outdoor Activities Club organises regular trips to Yorkshire or the Peak District, that include walking, climbing and caving.

In 2023, the school undertook a 3-week expedition to Borneo.

=== Sports ===
School sports include rugby, hockey, netball, cheerleading, and cricket.

== Headmasters ==
- 1502–1533: William Bridges (first)
- 1533–1560: John Bold
- 1560–1588: John Brownswerde
- 1588–1631: William Legh
- 1631–1648: Thomas Bolde
- 1648–1662: Henry Crosedale
- 1662–1666: Edward Powell
- 1666–1674: Ralph Gorse
- 1674–1676: Thomas Brancker
- 1676–1689: Rev. John Ashworth
- 1689–1690: Caleb Pott
- 1690–1704: Timothy Dobson
- 1704–1717: Edward Denham
- 1717–1720: George Hammond
- 1720–1745: Rev. Joseph Allen
- 1745: Edward Ford
- 1745–1749: Christopher Atkinson
- 1749–1774: Rowland Atkinson
- 1774–1790: Henry Ingles
- 1790–1828: David Davies
- 1828: Thomas Bourdillon
- 1828–1837: Rev. Francis Stonehewer Newbold
- 1837–1849: William Alexander Osborn
- 1849–1872: Rev. Thomas Brooking Cornish
- 1880–1910: Darwin Wilmot
- 1910–1933 : Francis Duntz Evans
- 1933–1966: Thomas Taylor Shaw
- 1966–1987: Alan Cooper
- 1987–2001: Adrian Silcock
- 2001–2011: Stephen Coyne
- 2011–2020: Simon Hyde
- 2020–present: Jason Slack

== Notable former pupils ==
- Ian Curtis (born 1956; died 1980), of the post-punk band Joy Division
- Thomas Newton (born 1542; died 1607), English clergyman and poet
- John Bradshaw (born 1602; died 1659), chief prosecutor of Charles I and the first man to sign his death warrant
- Charles Gordon Hewitt (born 1885; died 1920), British-Canadian consulting zoologist
- James Hope (born 1801; died 1841), cardiologist and physician
- Thomas Taylor (born 1852; died 1938), priest and historian
- Hewlett Johnson (born 1874; died 1966), Dean of Canterbury, known as the Red Dean
- Sir Eric Jones (born 1907; died 1986), former Director of GCHQ
- Anthony Golds (born 1919; died 2003), diplomat
- Tom Margerison (born 1923; died 2014), Founder of the New Scientist, journalist at the Sunday Times and BBC Broadcaster
- Alan Jones (born 1927; died 2009), Scottish first-class cricketer
- The Lord Beith of Berwick-on-Tweed, Alan Beith (born 1943), politician
- Duncan Robinson (born 1943; died 2022), Master of Magdalene College, Cambridge and Chairman of the Henry Moore Foundation
- Christian Blackshaw (born 1949), classical pianist
- Robert Longden (born 1951), British actor, director, composer and librettist.
- Steve Smith (born 1951), Captain of England (28 caps) and the British Lions rugby union teams
- John Blundell (born 1952; died 2014), economist
- Guy Ryder (born 1956), political scientist and Director-General of the International Labour Organization
- Stephen Morris (born 1957), of the post-punk band Joy Division, and New Order.
- Jon Craig (born 1957), Chief Political Correspondent of Sky News
- Michael Jackson (born 1958), former Channel 4 Chief Executive
- Guy Laurence (born 1961), CEO of Chelsea Football Club; former CEO of Vodafone UK
- Peter Moores (born 1962), England cricket coach
- William Jackson (born 1964), British businessman and philanthropist
- Andy Bird (born 1964), Chairman, Walt Disney International
- Oliver Holt (born 1966), former Chief Sports Correspondent for The Times and current Chief Sports Writer for the Daily Mirror
- Vice Admiral Jerry Kyd (born 1967), Fleet Commander of the Royal Navy, former Captain of HMS Queen Elizabeth
- Richard Pool-Jones (born 1969), former England rugby union and Stade Français Paris player
- Stanley Chow (born 1974), artist and illustrator
- Helen Marten (born 1985), artist and Turner Prize winner
- Matthew Falder (born 1988), convicted child sex offender
- Matty Healy (born 1989), singer in The 1975
- Tommy Taylor (born 1991), England rugby union capped player (hooker) with London Wasps
- Jonathan Marsden (born 1993), first-class cricketer, teacher at Harrow School
- Tom Hudson (born 1994), professional rugby player at Gloucester Rugby
- Blake Richardson (born 1999), musician, member of British band New Hope Club
- Cameron Redpath (born 1999), professional rugby player at Bath Rugby
- Alex Denny (born 2000), professional footballer at Everton FC
- Reece Grady (born 2005), swimmer
Old Maxonian International Rugby Players

Name	Country	Caps	First capped	Last capped	Notes
Steve Smith (born 1951)	England (United Kingdom) British and Irish Lions	28	1973	1983	professional club: Sale Sharks
Richard Pool-Jones (born 1969)	England	1	1998	1998	professional clubs: Biarritz Olympique and Stade Français Paris
Jos Baxendell (born 1972)	England	2	1998	1998	professional club: Sale Sharks
Tommy Taylor (born 1991)	England	1	2016	2016	professional clubs: Sale Sharks and London Wasps
Cameron Redpath (born 1999)	Scotland	2	2021	2021	professional club: Bath Rugby

== Publications ==
Published books by King's School teachers:

- Banner, Gillian (1999). Holocaust Literature: Schulz, Levi, Spiegelman and the Memory of the Offence. Vallentine Mitchell. ISBN 978-0-85303-371-4.
- Palazzo, Lynda (2002). Christina Rossetti's Feminist Theology. Palgrave Macmillan. ISBN 978-0-333-92033-6.
- Hill, David (2003). For King's and Country. Chameleon Press.
- Wilmot, Darwin (1910). A Short History of the Grammar School, Macclesfield 1503-1910. Claye, Brown and Claye. ASIN B0028T2CMK.
- Wilson, G. E. (1952). "History of Macclesfield Grammar School, 1503–1890". Leeds: MEd thesis.
