= Willie Jackson =

Willie Jackson may refer to:

- Willie Jackson (American football) (born 1971), former NFL wide receiver
- Willie Jackson (basketball) (born 1962), American former basketball player
- Willie Jackson (footballer) (1900–1986), Scottish footballer
- Willie Jackson (politician) (born 1961), New Zealand broadcaster and Member of Parliament
- New Orleans Willie Jackson, 1920s New Orleans jazz singer
- Little Willie Jackson (1912–2001), American jazz and rhythm and blues saxophonist, bandleader and occasional vocalist
- William Jackson (curler) (1871–1955), known as Willie, Scottish curler

== See also ==
- William Jackson (disambiguation)
- Will Jackson (disambiguation)
- Bill Jackson (disambiguation)
