= William H. Jackson =

William H. Jackson may refer to:

- William Harding Jackson (1901–1971), U.S. National Security Advisor, 1956
- William Henry Jackson (1843–1942), early photographer of the American West
- William Henry Jackson (priest) (1889–1931), Anglican priest, missionary, and inventor of Burmese Braille
- William Hicks Jackson (1835–1903), Confederate general from Tennessee
- William Humphreys Jackson (1839–1915), U.S. Representative from Maryland, 1901–1905, 1907–1909

== See also ==
- William Jackson (disambiguation)
