= William Cahill =

William Cahill may refer to:

- William T. Cahill (1912–1996), American politician
- William Vincent Cahill (1878–1924), American painter
- William Geoffrey Cahill, soldier, officer and police commissioner in Queensland, Australia

== See also ==
- Bill Cahill (disambiguation)
