= De Kruif =

De Kruif is a surname. Notable people with the surname include:

- Henri De Kruif (1882–1944), American visual artist and commercial artist
- Lodewijk de Kruif (born 1969), Dutch footballer and coach
- Mart de Kruif (born 1958), Dutch general
- Paul de Kruif (1890–1971), American microbiologist and author
