= Jonathan Marsden =

Jonathan Marsden may refer to:

- Jonathan Marsden (art historian) (born 1960), English art historian
- Jonathan Marsden (cricketer) (born 1993), English cricketer
