= William L. Jackson =

William L. Jackson may refer to:

- William Lawies Jackson (1840–1917), British businessman and Conservative politician
- William Lowther "Mudwall" Jackson, American Civil War general and Lieutenant Governor of Virginia

== See also ==
- William Jackson (disambiguation)
