= Ella Buchanan =

American sculptor

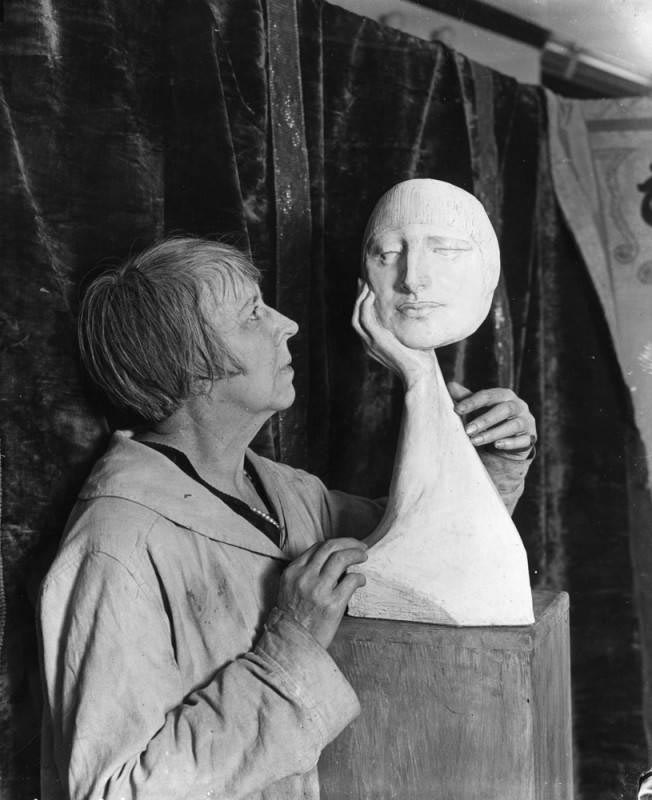
- Ella Buchanan with "Masque", 1926
- Born: July 14, 1867; Preston, Ontario, Canada
- Died: July 15, 1951 (aged 84); Los Angeles, California, United States
- Occupation: Sculptor
- Relatives: Luvena Vysekal (sister); Edouard Vysekal (brother-in-law)

Ella Buchanan (July 14, 1867 – July 15, 1951) was an American sculptor.

== Biography ==
Born in Canada, Buchanan grew up in Springfield, Illinois and Pittsburg, Kansas, where her father was a newspaper editor. She trained at the Art Institute of Chicago, where she also taught from 1911 to 1915. She became a sculptor in Los Angeles, California, and she was the vice president of the Sculptors' Guild of Southern California. Her work was part of the sculpture event in the art competition at the 1932 Summer Olympics.

Much of Buchanan's work featured social issues such as slavery, women’s rights, poverty, and early settlement of the California frontier. Among her works were “The Young Lincoln” (1927), “The Spirit of the West Going Forward” (1917), and “Navaho Indian and Zuni Girl” (1931). In 1938, her smaller-scale sculptures of cowboys, Indians and soldiers toured California as part of the WPA Federal Art Exhibition.

Buchanan’s most well-known sculpture was “The Suffragist Trying to Arouse Her Sisters” (1911). This sculpture was widely reproduced in small scale, and on posters, banners, and cards. The woman in the center of the group is the suffragist, blowing her metaphoric horn to awaken her sisters. The downtrodden figures around her represent Degradation, Vanity, Conventionality, and the Wage Earner, all of whom rely on the suffragist to lift them up.
