= Cameron Redpath =

Scotland international rugby union player

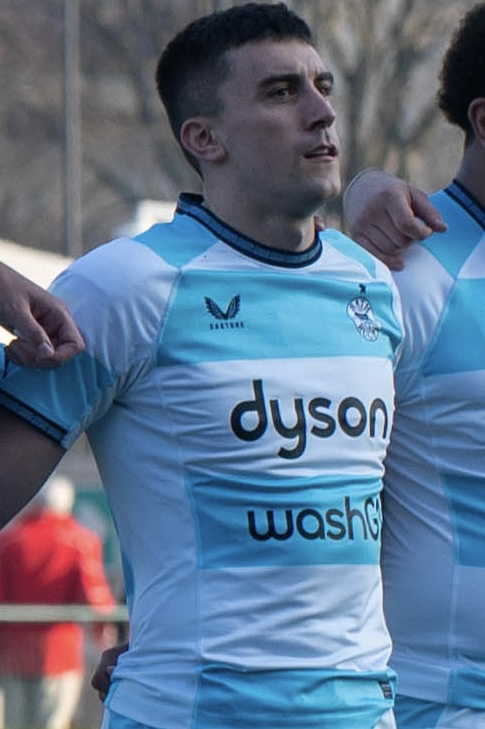
- Redpath ahead of Bath Rugby's match against Benetton Treviso, December 2024
- Born: 23 December 1999 (age 26) Narbonne, France
- Height: 1.88 m (6 ft 2 in)
- Weight: 96 kg (212 lb; 15 st 2 lb)
- School: Cheltenham College; King's School; Sedbergh School
- Notable relative: Bryan Redpath (father)

Rugby union career
- Position: Centre
- Current team: Bath
Senior career
| Years | Team | Apps | (Points) |
| 2017–2020 | Sale Sharks | 22 | (2) |
| 2020– | Bath | 99 | (75) |
- Correct as of 1 May 2026
International career
| Years | Team | Apps | (Points) |
| 2014-2015 | Scotland U16 | | |
| 2015-2016 | Scotland U18 | | |
| 2016–2017 | England U18 | 5 | (20) |
| 2018–2019 | England U20 | 9 | (15) |
| 2021– | Scotland | 15 | (5) |
| 2026 | Scotland 'A' | 1 | (0) |

Cameron Redpath (born 23 December 1999) is a Scotland international rugby union player who plays as a centre for Premiership Rugby club Bath. Born in France, he represents Scotland at international level after qualifying on ancestry grounds. His father, Bryan Redpath, is a former Scotland captain.

== Club career ==
He came through the Sale Sharks academy and played 22 games for the club before joining Bath Rugby in February 2020.

== International career ==
Cameron Redpath represented Scotland at U16 level and both Scotland and England at U18 level. Redpath represented England under-20 in the 2018 Six Nations Under 20s Championship, scoring tries against Wales and France. Redpath was selected in England's 34-man squad for their 2018 summer tour of South Africa but was unable to travel with the squad because of injury. He scored a try against Scotland in the 2019 Six Nations Under 20s Championship. He also played at the 2019 World Rugby Under 20 Championship however his tournament came to an end when he received a six-week ban for biting an opponent in their penultimate match against Ireland.

In January 2021, Redpath was selected in the Scotland 2021 Six Nations Championship squad. On 6 February 2021 he started for Scotland at Centre in the Calcutta Cup against England. Redpath came on as a replacement versus Wales in the 2022 Six Nations match.

In 2023 Redpath was selected in Scotland's 33 player squad for the 2023 Rugby World Cup in France.

He played for Scotland 'A' on 6 February 2026 in their match against Italy XV.

== Personal life ==
Cameron is the son of former Scotland international captain Bryan Redpath, and was born in France when his father was playing there for RC Narbonne. He was educated at Cheltenham College, The King's School, Macclesfield, and Sedbergh School on a scholarship. His uncle Craig also played at a high level, and his younger brother Murray was playing for the Scotland Under-20 team in 2022.

Bryan Redpath's nickname as a player was "Basil" and whilst at Sale his son was given the nickname "boom boom" as a result due to the association with the children's television character Basil Brush.
