= Will Jackson =

Will Jackson may refer to:

- Will E. Jackson (born 1945), Greenpeace activist and musician
- Honoré Jackson, born William Henry Jackson (1861–1952), also known as Will Jackson or Jaxon, leader of the North-West Rebellion in Canada, 1885
- Will Jackson, lead singer with the deathcore band, From a Second Story Window
- Will Jackson (Wentworth) a character from Wentworth Prison
- Will W. Jackson, American educator

== See also ==
- William Jackson (disambiguation)
- Willie Jackson (disambiguation)
- Bill Jackson (disambiguation)
