= Bill Cahill =

Bill Cahill may refer to:

- Bill Cahill (American football) (1951–2026), American professional football player
- Bill Cahill (Australian footballer) (1911–1966), Australian rules footballer
- Bill Cahill (hurler) (1923–2001), Irish hurler

== See also ==
- William Cahill (disambiguation)
