= Robert Marsden (cricketer) =

English cricketer

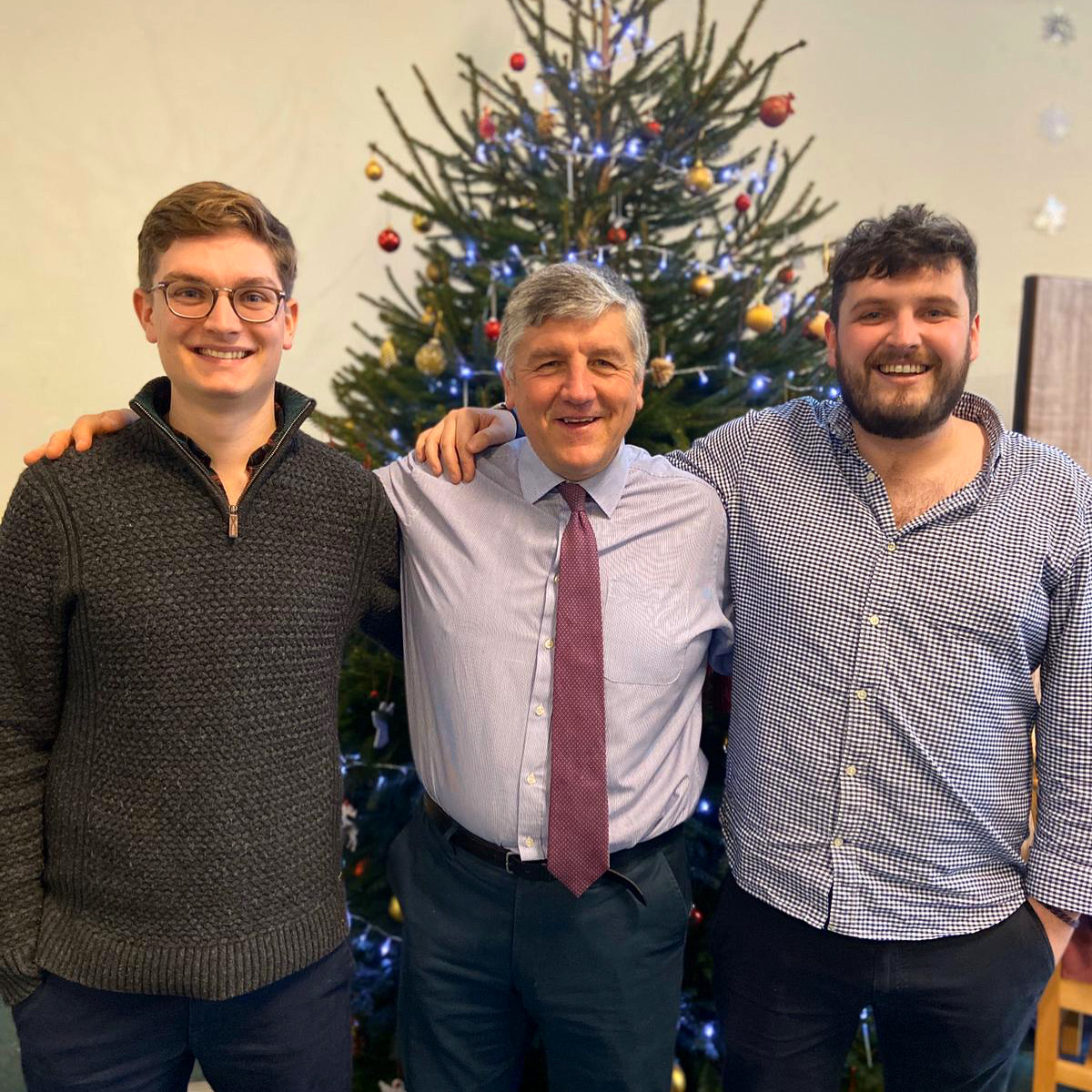
- Marsden (centre) in 2019

Personal information
- Born: 2 April 1959 (age 67); Hammersmith, London, England
- Batting: Right-handed
- Bowling: Right-arm off break
- Relatives: Jonathan Marsden (son)

Domestic team information
- Years: Team
- 1979–1982: Oxford University

Career statistics
Competition	First-class
Matches	13
Runs scored	507
Batting average	23.04
100s/50s	0/2
Top score	60
Catches/stumpings	6/–
- Source: Cricinfo, 25 May 2011

Robert Marsden (born 2 April 1959) is an English former cricketer. Marsden was a right-handed batsman who allegedly bowled right-arm off break. He was born in Hammersmith.

Marsden made his first-class debut for Oxford University against Warwickshire in 1979. Marsden played 12 further first-class matches for the university, the last coming against Cambridge University in 1982. In his 13 first-class matches, he scored 507 runs at a batting average of 23.04, with a highest score of 60. His highest score came against Warwickshire in 1982. He did not bowl in first-class cricket. His son, Jonathan, also played first-class cricket.
