= Charles J. Willoughby Jr. =

American judge (born 1978)

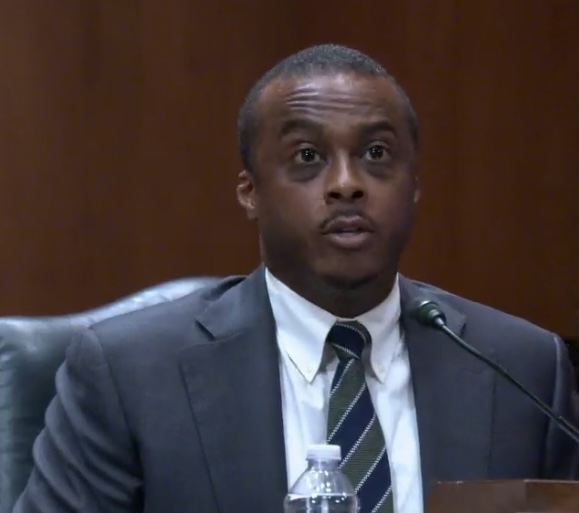

Associate Judge of the Superior Court of the District of Columbia
- Incumbent
- Assumed office August 19, 2024
- Appointed by: Joe Biden
- Preceded by: William M. Jackson

Personal details
- Born: Charles James Willoughby Jr. February 25, 1978 (age 48) Washington, D.C., U.S.
- Education: Morehouse College (BA); Belmont University (BA); Howard University (JD)

Charles James Willoughby Jr. (born February 25, 1978) is an American lawyer who is serving as an associate judge of the Superior Court of the District of Columbia.

== Early life and education ==
Willoughby is a native of Washington, D.C. He received a Bachelor of Arts from Morehouse College in 2000, a Bachelor of Arts from Belmont University in 2002 and a Juris Doctor from Howard University School of Law in 2007.

== Career ==
From 2009 to 2013, Willoughby was an assistant attorney general in the Criminal Division of the United States Virgin Islands Department of Justice. From 2013 to 2014, he was an associate attorney at Quintairos, Prieto, Wood & Boyer, P.A. From 2014 to 2024, he served as an assistant United States attorney in the U.S. Attorney's Office for the District of Columbia; being appointed a deputy chief in the Major Crimes Section of the Superior Court division in 2023. He also practiced criminal and civil law at a firm in Saint Thomas, U.S. Virgin Islands.

=== D.C. superior court service ===
In March 2023, Willoughby was one of three people recommended by the District of Columbia Judicial Nomination Commission to fill the vacancy left by the retirement of Judge John M. Campbell. On June 28, 2023, President Joe Biden announced his intent to nominate Willoughby to serve as an associate judge of the Superior Court of the District of Columbia. On July 11, 2023, his nomination was sent to the Senate. President Biden nominated Willoughby to the seat vacated by Judge William M. Jackson, who retired on March 31, 2022. On September 21, 2023, a hearing on his nomination was held before the Senate Homeland Security and Governmental Affairs Committee. On September 27, 2023, his nomination was reported out of the committee by a 7–2 vote. On January 3, 2024, his nomination was returned to the president under Rule XXXI, Paragraph 6 of the United States Senate. He was renominated on January 11, 2024. On January 31, 2024, his nomination was reported out of the committee by a 10–3 vote. On July 9, 2024, the Senate invoked cloture on his nomination by a 54–39 vote. The next day, his nomination was confirmed by a 50–43 vote. He was sworn in on August 19, 2024.

== Awards and recognition ==
In 2021, he received the AUSA Association's Patricia J. Smoot Award.

== See also ==
- List of African American jurists

Legal offices
Preceded by William M. Jackson	Associate Judge of the Superior Court of the District of Columbia; 2024–present	Incumbent
