= William Jackson (businessman) =

British businessman and philanthropist (born 1963)

William Nicholas Jackson (born 21 October 1963) is a British businessman and philanthropist. He was the founder of Bridgepoint Group plc, the listed alternative asset manager headquartered in the United Kingdom. He is the Chair of Burberry Group plc, the FTSE 100 luxury fashion house, and the Chair of the LTA (The Lawn Tennis Association), the national governing body of tennis in the United Kingdom. He previously served as Chair of Pret A Manger from 2013 to 2018 and was President of the Board of MotoGP from 2007 to June 2025. He was appointed a Visiting Fellow of Oxford University in 2026.

== Early life ==
Jackson was born in Macclesfield, Cheshire, on 21 October 1963. He attended The King’s School in Macclesfield. He studied at Exeter College, Oxford, earning a first-class degree. In subsequent years, he funded the Jackson Library at Exeter College.

== Career ==
Jackson began his career in the graduate programme at County NatWest, part of the NatWest banking group, where he worked in the private investment division. He was named UK head of NatWest Ventures in 1992 and later co-led a management buyout to establish Bridgepoint Capital (subsequently Bridgepoint Group plc). Jackson served as its Chief Executive from 2001 to 2024. During his tenure, Bridgepoint expanded its operations internationally, eventually listing on the London Stock Exchange in 2021.

=== Pret A Manger ===
Jackson served as Chairman of Pret A Manger alongside CEO Clive Schlee. The company was later sold to JAB Holdings for £1.5 billion.

=== MotoGP ===
From 2006 and 2025, Jackson served as President of MotoGP, the rights holder of the World Championship for motorcycle racing. Bridgepoint acquired MotoGP in 2006 and sold it in 2025 to Liberty Media for a reported €4.2 billion.

=== Burberry ===
Jackson joined the Board of Burberry in July 2026 and became Chair of the company in November 2026, in succession to Gerry Murphy, who completed his nine year service in the role. Burberry is the UK’s largest luxury goods business operating globally.

=== Lawn Tennis Association ===
In March 2025, Jackson was appointed Chairman Designate of the Lawn Tennis Association (LTA), and became Chairman following the 2025 Wimbledon Championships.

=== Other board roles ===
Jackson has served on boards of various companies, including British Land plc, where he held the position of Senior Independent Director until 2021, and Berkeley Group plc until the autumn of 2025.

== Philanthropy ==
Jackson served as Senior Independent Director of The Royal Marsden NHS Foundation Trust until September 2026 and co-chairs the Royal Marsden’s Global Cancer Campaign. He has funded educational and healthcare initiatives, including access-to-education programmes and cancer research at institutions such as the Royal Marsden and the Christie Hospital in Manchester.

In 2012 he donated £1.2 million to endow in perpetuity a fellowship in History at his alma mater, Exeter College. He is a Bancroft Fellow of Mansfield College, Oxford.

== Personal life ==
Jackson is married to Janie Blackburn. They have three daughters and reside in Devon. His Who's Who entry lists his interests as tennis, walking, soccer, architecture and modern art.
