= Billy Jackson (boxer) =

British boxer

Personal information
- Nickname: The Kid
- Born: Maidstone, England
- Height: 6 ft (183 cm)
- Weight: Light-middleweight

Boxing career
- Stance: Orthodox

Boxing record
- Total fights: 8
- Wins: 7
- Win by KO: 0
- Losses: 1
- Draws: 0
- No contests: 0
Medal record
Men's amateur boxing
Representing England
Denmark
Gold medal – first place	2016 Copenhagen	Welterweight

Billy Jackson is a former British professional boxer, also known by the nickname of "The Kid", who boxed as an English professional light middleweight boxer.

== Amateur career ==
Jackson boxed as an amateur boxer. He lost two fights, in a youth national final and an England select team V. Cayman Islands. He won gold at the Hvidorve Box Cup in Denmark representing England.

== Coaching ==
Jackson serves as a coach for England Boxing.

== Unlicensed boxing ==
Jackson also boxed in less regulated prize fighting (unlicensed boxing), mainly for money. At the early age of 14, he had to box much older opponents. Jackson fought 27 unlicensed boxing fights, winning English and British tiles on various promotions like UKBC. Jackson had one of the quickest knockouts, aged only 16, on a much older opponent on Lee Eaton's EBA, in under 16 seconds of the first round. Jackson won 24 out of 27 unlicensed fights, losing two and drawing one.

=== Unlicensed record ===
27 fights	24 wins	2 losses
By knockout	11	2
By decision	13	0
By disqualification	0	0
Draws	1	
No contests	0	

== Professional career ==
Jackson made his professional debut on 17 November 2018, winning a four-round points decision over Dylan Draper at the Brentwood Centre in Brentwood. Jackson put Draper down in the first round.

On 14 December 2018, Jackson beat Lee Hallett in his second professional fight. The fight was shown live on television, via BoxNation.

Jackson's third fight came on 8 May 2019 against MJ Hall at the York Hall, Bethnal Green. Jackson beat Hall, winning all rounds.

On 9 July 2022, Jackson won his fourth professional fight at the Lee Valley Athletic Centre. After being the sparring partner to Conor Benn in 2021 and 2022, Jackson was offered a fight on Matchroom DAZN in 2023.

In Jackson's fifth professional fight, he fought another undefeated boxer Gideon Onyenani (Jonas) on 1 October 2022 at the York Hall, over eight rounds. Jackson was co-main event. Both fighters were 4-0 going into this fight. Jackson only dropped one round over eight rounds, and was close to inflicting a stoppage in the seventh round.

Before his sixth fight, a minor anomaly in his medical scan drew the attention of the British Boxing Board of Control (BBBofC). Prioritising athlete safety, the BBBofC recommended that Jackson undergo a CT scan to further assess his health and ensure his well-being in the ring.

On 18 November 2023, Jackson boxed his sixth professional fight at York Hall versus Jurell Patterson, putting Patterson down in the second round for the Southern Area Eliminator, although Jackson failed to win the Southern Area title.

Jackson lost in his eighth professional fight on 24 September 2024 to Asinia Byfield for the Commonwealth and English Title Eliminator. The BBBofC had the fight a draw going into the ninth round, with Jackson winning the tenth, however Boxing News scored the fight 92–98, with Jackson only winning one round.

Jackson pulled out from the O2 bout in February 2025.

=== Professional boxing record ===
8 fights	7 wins	1 loss
By knockout	0	0
By decision	7	1
