= Jonathan Marsden (cricketer) =

English cricketer

Personal information
- Born: 7 April 1993 (age 33); Pembury, Kent, England
- Height: 6 ft 3 in (1.91 m)
- Batting: Right-handed
- Bowling: Right-arm fast-medium
- Relatives: Robert Marsden (father)

Domestic team information
- Years: Team
- 2013–2017: Oxford University
- 2014–2016: Oxford MCCU

Career statistics
Competition	First-class
Matches	8
Runs scored	55
Batting average	11.00
100s/50s	0/0
Top score	27*
Balls bowled	1,456
Wickets	26
Bowling average	26.84
5 wickets in innings	1
10 wickets in match	0
Best bowling	5/41
Catches/stumpings	5/–
- Source: Cricinfo, 12 April 2020

Jonathan Marsden (born 7 April 1993) is an English former first-class cricketer.

The son of the cricketer Robert Marsden, he was born at April 1993 at Pembury, Kent. He was raised at Buxton, Derbyshire and was educated nearby at The King's School, Macclesfield. From King's he went up to St Hilda's College, Oxford. While studying at Oxford, he played first-class cricket for Oxford University, making his debut against Cambridge University in The University Match of 2013. He played first-class cricket for Oxford University until 2017, making a further four appearances in The University Match. In addition to playing for Oxford University, Marsden also made three appearances for Oxford MCCU against Nottinghamshire and Warwickshire in 2013, and Northamptonshire in 2014. (Note: Oxford MCCU differs from Oxford University Cricket Club in that it is open to students at Oxford Brookes University, whereas Oxford University Cricket Club is exclusively for students of the constituent colleges of the University of Oxford.) In eight first-class matches, Marsden scored 55 runs with a high score of 27 not out, while with his right-arm fast-medium bowling he took 26 wickets at an average of 26.84, with best figures of 5 for 41. These figures, which were his only five wicket haul, came against Cambridge University in 2017 University Match. An all-round sportsman, Marsden also played rugby union for Oxford University RFC.

After completing his Postgraduate Certificate in Education, he became a maths teacher at Harrow School. He was appointed master-in-charge of cricket at Harrow in December 2019, working alongside the newly appointed director of cricket Mark Ramprakash.
