= William Vincent Cahill =

American painter and art educator

- Born: 1878; Syracuse, New York, U.S.
- Died: 1924 (aged 45–46); Chicago, Illinois, U.S.
- Education: Art Students League of New York
- Occupations: Painter, art educator
- Spouse: Katherine Kavanaugh

William Vincent Cahill (1878-1924) was an American painter and art educator.

== Life ==
Cahill was born in 1878 in Syracuse, New York. He studied at the Art Students League of New York.

Cahill first became in Boston, where he shared a studio with John Hubbard Rich until 1914, when he moved to California. He taught art in Laguna Beach, Pasadena and Hollywood, and he exhibited his work at the California Art Club and the Los Angeles County Museum of Art. He taught at the University of Kansas for a year, and later moved his studio to Chicago.

Cahill married Katherine Kavanaugh. He died in 1924 in Chicago. His work can be seen at the Laguna Art Museum.
