= William Jackson (inventor) =

British mechanical engineer and inventor

William Jackson (29 June 1849 - 15 June 1915) was a British mechanical engineer and inventor of tea-rolling machines, tea driers, tea leaf sorters, and other machinery used in the processing of tea for shipment and final use by consumers. His inventions revolutionized the tea industry in Assam and Ceylon and allowed those regions to compete successfully with China in the economical production of tea.

Jackson was born at Keith Hall, Aberdeenshire. In 1872, when Jackson began inventing tea processing machinery, the cost of tea production in India was 11 pence a pound. By 1913, improved machinery had cut the cost to 3 pence a pound. Eight thousand rolling machines took care of the tea which previously would have called for the hand work of a 1.5 million local plantation workers.

When tea was first cultivated on plantations, the leaf was rolled by hand, dried over charcoal fires, and trampled into the chests by the workers’ feet. Jackson ushered in the new era of scientific preparation of the leaf in sanitary surroundings with meticulous attention to hygienic requirements.

Jackson died in Aberdeen, aged 65. He left half of his estate, about £20,000 (£2.1M in 2017 figures), to whatever charities the Indian Tea Association might choose.
