= William M. Jackson (judge) =

American judge

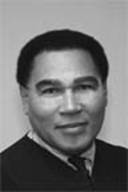

Associate Judge of the Superior Court of the District of Columbia
- In office June 1992 – March 31, 2022
- President: George H. W. Bush
- Succeeded by: Charles J. Willoughby Jr.

Personal details
- Born: William Mckinley Jackson; January 24, 1953 (age 72); Baltimore, Maryland, U.S.
- Education: Brown University (BA); Harvard University (JD)

William M. Jackson (born January 24, 1953) is a former associate judge on the Superior Court of the District of Columbia.

== Education and career ==
Jackson earned his Bachelor of Arts from Brown University and his Juris Doctor from Harvard Law School.

After graduating, Jackson joined the Justice Department as a staff attorney in the Anti-trust Division.

=== D.C. Superior Court ===
President George H. W. Bush nominated Jackson on January 22, 1992, to a 15-year term as an associate judge on the Superior Court of the District of Columbia. On May 14, 1992, the Senate Committee on Homeland Security and Governmental Affairs held a hearing on his nomination. On June 25, 1992, the Committee reported his nomination favorably to the senate floor. On June 26, 1992, the full Senate confirmed his nomination by voice vote. He retired on March 31, 2022.

Legal offices
Preceded by	Associate Judge of the Superior Court of the District of Columbia; 1992–2022	Succeeded by Charles J. Willoughby Jr.
