= Modern school =

Modern school or Modern School may refer to:

- Ferrer movement, or Modern School movement, an early 20th century libertarian education model
  - Escuela Moderna (Spanish, 'Modern School'), Ferrer's school in Barcelona
  - Ferrer Modern School, at the Ferrer Center and Colony in New York and then New Jersey, United States
- Al-Madrasa al-Ḥadītha ('The Modern School'), a modernist literary movement that began in 1917 in Egypt
- Freinet Modern School Movement, the community of teachers who follow the educational and social practices of Célestin Freinet
- Modern School, Lucknow, a school in India
- Modern School (New Delhi), a school in India

== See also ==
- The Modern School Movement (book), a 1980 history book by Paul Avrich about the American Ferrer school
- Secondary modern school, a type of secondary school in England, Wales and Northern Ireland from 1944 until the 1970s
- Bedford Modern School, a school in Bedford, England
- Perth Modern School, a school in Western Australia
