= Nellie Huntington Gere =

American painter and illustrator

- Born: October 5, 1868; Norwich, Connecticut
- Died: July 29, 1949 (aged 80); Los Angeles, California
- Known for: Painting, Educator

Nellie Huntington Gere (October 5, 1868–July 29, 1949) was an American painter and illustrator. She was the head of the art department at State Normal School . She was also an instructor at the University of California, Los Angeles. She was known for her landscape works and etchings.

== Education ==
Nellie Huntington Gere studied at the Art Institute of Chicago, Pratt Institute, and the Chicago Academy of Fine Arts.

== Career ==
Nellie Huntington Gere exhibited at the Art Institute of Chicago 1904–1906. She was the author of a book titled Outline on Picture Study in the Elementary School. She was a member of the California Society of Etchers and the Southern California Art Teachers Association.

Nellie Gere exhibited frequently in Northern and Southern California, including solo and group exhibitions at the: California State Normal School (the future UCLA) in 1908 and 1921; Hotel Watson of Los Angeles in 1911; Hotel Del Monte Art Gallery of Monterey in 1913; San Francisco Art Association in 1916; and Annuals of the Art Teachers Association of Southern California in the 1920s. According to the U.S. Census of 1930 she resided in Los Angeles with her second cousin Helen Clark Chandler, also a well-established artist.

== Death ==
Nellie Huntington Gere died in Los Angeles on July 29, 1949.
