= George Stanley (footballer) =

Australian rules footballer, born 1909

Personal information
- Full name: George Stanley
- Born: 26 July 1909
- Died: 22 December 1982 (aged 73)
- Original team: Kingsville Amateurs

Playing career^{1}
Years	Club	Games (Goals)
1929–30	Footscray	10 (1)
- ^{1} Playing statistics correct to the end of 1930.

George Stanley (26 July 1909 – 22 December 1982) was a former Australian rules footballer who played with Footscray in the Victorian Football League (VFL).
