= William Jackson (priest, died 1903) =

William Oliver Jackson was an Anglican priest in Ireland during the second half of the 19th century and the first decade of the 20th.

Jackson was born in County Mayo and educated at Trinity College Dublin. He was ordained in 1847. He became the incumbent of Killala in 1871; the Archdeacon of Killala in 1874; and Rural Dean in 1883. He died in 1903.
