= William F. Jackson =

American painter and curator

William Franklin Jackson
- Born: c. 1850; Council Bluffs, Iowa, U.S.
- Died: January 8, 1936; Sacramento, California, U.S.
- Occupation: Painter

William F. Jackson (c. 1850 – January 8, 1936) was an American painter and art curator.
