= Bill Jackson (footballer, born 1894) =

English footballer

Personal information
- Full name: William Hickin Jackson
- Date of birth: 1894
- Place of birth: Oldbury, England
- Date of death: 3 May 1917 (aged 22–23)
- Place of death: France
- Position: Centre forward

Senior career*
Years	Team	Apps	(Gls)
- Oldbury Town
- Langley St Michael's
1912–1917	West Bromwich Albion	3	(0)
- * Club domestic league appearances and goals

William Hickin Jackson (1894 – 3 May 1917) was an English professional footballer who played as a centre forward in the Football League for West Bromwich Albion.

== Personal life ==
Jackson joined in the Officer Training Corps during the First World War and was commissioned as a second lieutenant in the West Yorkshire Regiment on 22 January 1916, a year-and-a-half after the beginning of the war. He was killed in France on 3 May 1917 and is commemorated on the Arras Memorial.

== Career statistics ==
Appearances and goals by club, season and competition
Club	Season	League			FA Cup		Total	
Club	Season	Division	Apps	Goals	Apps	Goals	Apps	Goals
West Bromwich Albion	1912–13	First Division	3	0	0	0	3	0
Career total			3	0	0	0	3	0
