= Donna N. Schuster =

American painter

Donna N. Schuster (born in Milwaukee, Wisconsin 1883) was an American easel painter, who created work in the style of modern impressionism using the medium of oil and watercolor. She focused her work in Wisconsin then later moved to Los Angeles, California where she died in 1953.

== Biography ==
Schuster got her education at the Art Institute of Chicago, then later attended Boston Museum School along with Edmund C. Tarbell and Frank W. Benson.

=== Career ===
In 1914 she was a student at the William Merritt Chase Summer School of Art in Carmel-by-the-Sea, California. Despite the brutal murder of her fellow student Helena Wood Smith, she returned to Carmel in 1916 and sent her paintings to the Woman’s Exhibition at the Oakland Art Gallery.

In 1923, Schuster built a studio-home in the hills of Griffith Park and joined the faculty of Otis Art Institute. She also had a second home and studio in Laguna Beach where she spent her summers.

She returned as an exhibitor to the Oakland Art Gallery in 1924 when Director William Clapp organized a show of regional “Impressionists,” which was so successful that it was sent to the Los Angeles Museum. Schuster expanded her horizons when she was able to join a painting tour through Belgium. She co-founded the California Art Club and Women Painters of the West

She was a member of the Group of Eight, who considered themselves modernist in their use of rich color, expressive techniques, and an emphasis on the figure. She also was a great admirer of Claude Monet and, in fact, built a lily pond in her backyard that she used for a series of lily pond studies, not unlike those of Monet. Toward the end of the 1920s Schuster studied with modernist artist Stanton Macdonald-Wright (1890-1973), leading her to experiment with Cubism and later, Abstract Expressionism.

Her art was exhibited at the Los Angeles County Museum of Art in 1914, 1917, 1920, 1927 and 1929. Later, in the 1930s, she had shows at the San Francisco Art Association, the New York Academy of Fine Art and the New York Watercolor Society. She was a founding member of the California Watercolor Society and was involved with their exhibitions from 1921 until the mid 1940s.

In 1953, Schuster died, trapped inside her home as it was destroyed in a brush-fire.

== Works ==
- 1917 In the Garden (Fleischer Museum)
- 1917 Sleep (oil on canvas, Women's Museum of California Collection)
- 1921 O'er Waiting Harp Strings (Laguna Art Museum)
- 1925 Water Lilies
- 1930 High Sierras Virginia Lake
- Girl with Mirror
- Construction #2
- Mission Fountain
- 1951 Hollywood Houses

== Exhibitions ==
- 1913 Minnesota Art Exhibition
- 1914 Los Angeles County Museum of Art (solo)
- 1915 Panama Pacific International Exhibition
- 1917 Los Angeles County Museum of Art (solo)
- 1920 Los Angeles County Museum of Art (solo)
- 1926 California Watercolor Society
- 1927 Los Angeles County Museum of Art, with Mabel Alvarez
- 1939 Golden Gate International Exhibition
