= John Hubbard Rich =

American illustrator

- Born: March 5, 1876; Boston, Massachusetts, U.S.
- Died: March 30, 1954 (aged 78); Los Angeles, California, U.S.
- Occupations: Illustrator, painter, art educator
- Spouse: Helen Wood Rich

John Hubbard Rich (March 5, 1876 - March 30, 1954) was an American illustrator, painter and art educator. He was the president of the California Art Club from 1944 to 1945.

== Life ==
Rich was born in 1876 in Boston, Massachusetts. He studied at the Art Students League of New York and the Boston Museum School.

Rich began his career as an illustrator for the Minneapolis Times. He later taught art at the Groton School and shared a studio with William Vincent Cahill in Boston until 1914, when he moved to California. He opened his own studio in the Hollywood Hills and became a portrait and still life painter. He taught Art at the University of Southern California from 1920 to 1925, and at the Los Angeles County Art Institute from 1921 to 1949. He was the president of the California Art Club from 1944 to 1945.

Rich married Helen Wood, and they resided at 2212 San Marco Drive, Los Angeles. He died on March 30, 1954, in Los Angeles, California. His work can be seen at the Los Angeles County Museum of Art. His work was also part of the painting event in the art competition at the 1932 Summer Olympics.
