= Luvena Vysekal =

American painter

Luvena Buchanan Vysekal
- Born: Luvena Buchanan; December 23, 1873; Le Mars, Iowa, U.S.
- Died: January 11, 1954 (aged 80); Los Angeles, California, U.S.
- Other names: Benjamin Blue, Luvena Vysekal
- Education: School of the Art Institute of Chicago
- Occupation: Painter
- Spouse: Edouard Vysekal (1914–?)
- Relatives: Ella Buchanan (sister)

Luvena Buchanan Vysekal (née Luvena Buchanan, pseudonym Benjamin Blue; December 23, 1873 – January 11, 1954) was an American portrait painter.

== Biography ==
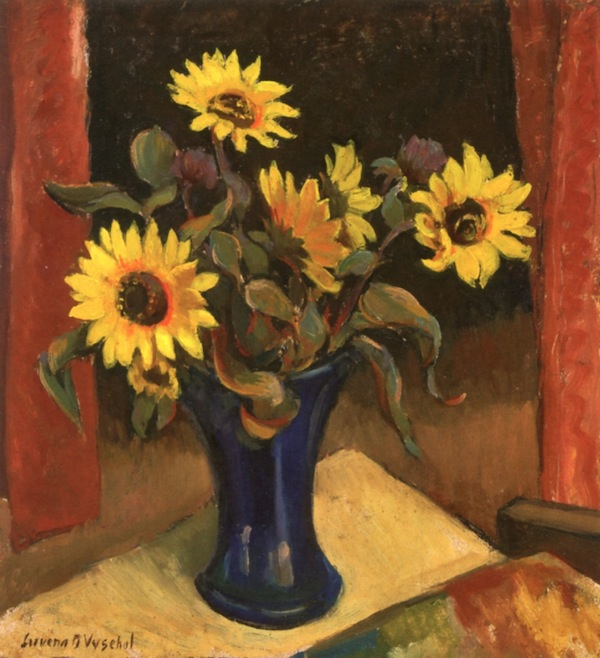
Sunflowers, 1927

She was born December 23, 1873, in Le Mars, Iowa, her parents were Scottish.

She was trained at the Art Institute of Chicago between 1910 and 1914, where her future husband Edouard Vysekal was one of her professors. They married in 1914, and moved to Southern California. She later opened a studio on the Sunset Strip in Los Angeles, California. In 1895 she used the alias of Hattie Lummis and wrote a poem for a song prize commissioned by the Wabash Railboard, which became "In the Shadow of the Pines," later performed by the Carter Family and Bascom Lamar Lunsford. She used the pseudonym "Benjamin Blue" to publish a 1922 book, Counterfeit Presentations.
