= Edouard Vysekal =

American painter

Edouard Antonin Vysekal
- Born: March 17, 1890; Kutná Hora, Bohemia
- Died: December 2, 1939 (aged 49); Los Angeles, California, U.S.
- Other name: Edward Antonin Vysekal
- Occupation: Painter
- Employer(s): School of the Art Institute of Chicago, Art Students League of Los Angeles, Otis College of Art and Design
- Spouse: Luvena Vysekal
- Relatives: Ella Buchanan (sister-in-law)

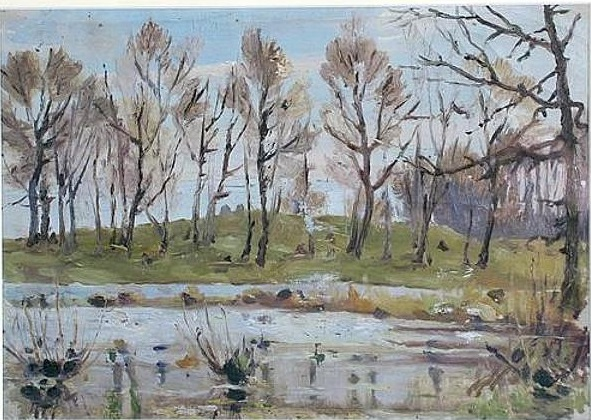
Winterish, St. Paul. 1911.

Edouard Vysekal (1890 – December 2, 1939) was a Bohemia-born American painter and art educator. He was active in Chicago and Southern California.

== Biography ==
Vysekal was born on March 17, 1890, in Kutná Hora, Bohemia, Austro-Hungarian Empire. He was born into a family of artists. Vysekal began his art education in Prague. Around 1907, he moved to St Paul, Minnesota to join his father. Later studying at the School of the Art Institute of Chicago (SAIC) under John Vanderpoel, Stanton MacDonald-Wright, Harry Mills Walcott, and Morgan Russell.

He taught at the School of the Art Institute of Chicago (from 1912 to 1914) and around 1914, he married a student Luvena Buchanan. The couple moved to Southern California after marriage.

Additionally he taught at the Art Students League of Los Angeles, and the Otis College of Art and Design (formally Otis Art Institute; from 1922 to 1939). His work is in the permanent collection of the Los Angeles County Museum of Art.
