= Schalkwijk =

Schalkwijk may refer to:

- Schalkwijk, Haarlem, a neighbourhood in the city of Haarlem, the Netherlands
- Schalkwijk, Utrecht, a village in the Netherlands

== People with the surname ==
- Bob Schalkwijk, photographer

== See also ==
- van Schalkwyk, an Afrikaans surname
