= Louise Jarecka =

American singer and writer

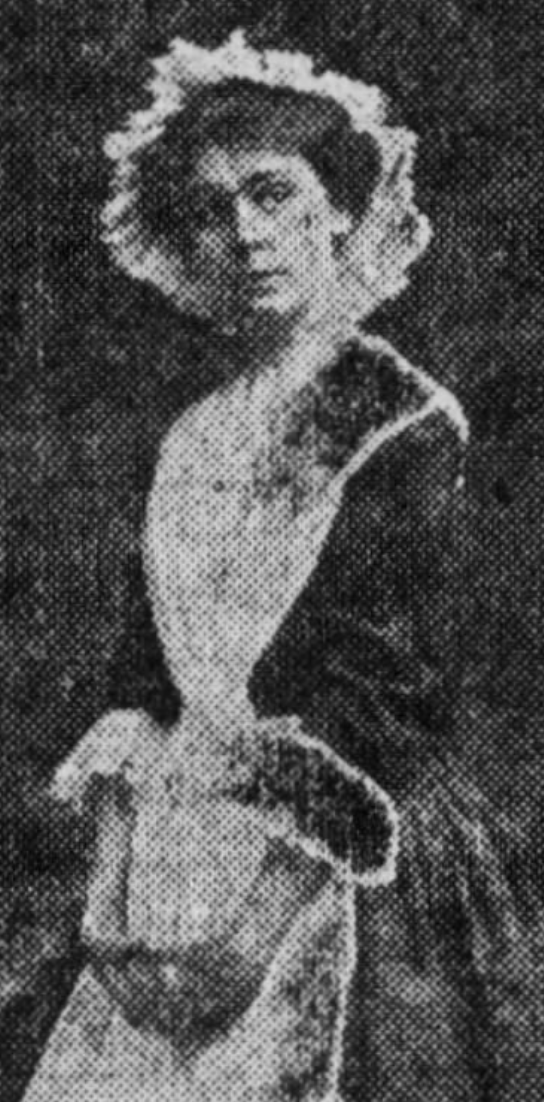
- Lewelling in costume for a folksong recital, 1914
- Born: Louise Lewelling; December 10, 1880; Mitchellville, Iowa, U.S.
- Died: March 6, 1954 (aged 73); New York, New York, U.S.
- Occupations: Writer, singer, translator
- Father: Lorenzo D. Lewelling
- Relatives: Verna Cook Salomonsky (cousin); Henryk Jarecki (father-in-law)

Louise Llewellyn Jarecka (December 10, 1880 – March 6, 1954), born Louise Lewelling, was an American concert singer, writer and translator. She was Paris correspondent for the magazine Musical America, and promoted Polish cultural arts after World War II.

== Early life and education ==
Llewellyn was born in Mitchellville, Iowa, and raised in Kansas, the daughter of Lorenzo Dow Lewelling and his first wife, Angelina Cook Lewelling. Her father was governor of Kansas. She studied music in Boston, Chicago and Paris, and trained as a singer with Marcella Sembrich. Her cousin Verna Cook Salomonsky was a noted architect and writer.

== Career ==
As a young woman in Chicago, Lewelling had some success as a composer with the song, "Prayer of Thanksgiving", with words based on Swinburne's "The Garden of Proserpine". She became known for her costumed recitals of European folk songs including at a 1914 Washington, D.C., reception hosted by President Woodrow Wilson and his first wife. She sang at the White House again in 1916, at a party for Edith Galt Wilson. She gave her first New York recital in 1919.

Jarecka gave a vocal recital at New York's Steinway Hall in 1927, accompanied by her husband; "Mme. Jarecka sang with sincerity and poetic insight," noted The New York Times, "despite obvious limitations of voice and technique". She was Paris correspondent for the magazine Musical America and wrote about art for The New York Times and other American publications. She performed as a concert singer in Europe in the 1920s and 1930s. Gustaw Gwozdecki painted her portrait in 1928. She lived in Poland until war approached, then in Paris and London, before returning to the United States. After the war, she wrote about Polish folk arts, especially weaving. She helped arrange an exhibit of Polish crafts at the Smithsonian in 1949, and wrote an essay for the exhibit catalog.

== Publications ==
- "Folk Art Museum for Paris: The 'Manual Aristocracy'" (1938, The New York Times)
- Marian Piotrowski, Adventures of a Polish Prisoner (1943, translated by Jarecka)
- "Hands to the Spindle" (1948, Poland of Today)
- "From the Abyss of Centuries" (1949, Poland of Today)
- Made in Poland: Living Traditions of the Land (1949, illustrated by Maciej Nowicki)
- "Christmas Carols and Mystery Plays" (1949, Poland of Today)
- "Edith Huntington Snow: Weaver, Artist, Craftsman" (1950)
- "Contemporary Polish Weaving" (1950)

== Personal life ==
Llewellyn married Polish composer Tadeusz Jarecki in 1921 in New York, and used the feminine form of his surname. Jarecka died in 1954, at the age of 73, in New York City. The Jareckis' papers are at Indiana University.
