= Marshall Cobun =

American politician

Marshall W. Cobun was an American politician and farmer who served in the Kansas House of Representatives and the West Virginia Senate.

Cobun served one term from 1883 to 1885 as a West Virginia state senator representing Barbour County and three terms from 1891 to 1895 and 1901 to 1903 as a member of the Kansas House of Representatives representing Barton County. Cobun served as a Republican in the West Virginia Legislature and a Progressive and Democrat in the Kansas Legislature and was the president of the Board of World's Fair Managers at Chicago.

At the start of the 1893 legislative session on January 10, 1893, he was appointed to a committee to inform Governor Lorenzo D. Lewelling that the House of Representatives was organized. On January 15, 1901, he voted for Grant W. Harrington for state printer of Kansas during a joint session of the Kansas Legislature. On January 22, 1901, he voted for former state Rep. David Overmyer for U.S. Senate over former state Rep. Joseph R. Burton, who was elected to the U.S. Senate.

1891–1893 Kansas House of Representatives Committee assignments:

- Chairman of the Federal Relations Committee
- Forestry Committee

1893–1895 Kansas House of Representatives Committee assignments:

- Ways and Means Committee
- Judicial Apportionment Committee
- Public Lands Committee

1901–1903 Kansas House of Representatives Committee assignments:

- Engrossed Bills Committee
