= Gemma Taccogna =

Italian-born visual artist (1923–2007)

Gemma Fane Taccogna
- Born: May 9, 1923; Bari, Apulia, Italy
- Died: May 8, 2007 (aged 83); Torrance, California, United States
- Other names: Gemma Taccogna Walker, Gemma Walker, Gemma Del Rio, Gemma Taccogna Sexton, Gemma Taccogna de Sexton, Gemma Sexton
- Education: Cooper Union, Art Students League of New York
- Occupations: Visual artist, educator
- Known for: Papier-mâché, ceramics, painting
- Spouse(s): Claude Walker (m. 1945–?; divorce), Juan Del Rio Huidobro (m. 1952–?; divorced), Fred Sexton (m. 1960s–1969; divorced)
- Children: 3

Gemma Fane Taccogna (1923–2007) was an Italian-born American and Mexican visual artist and educator. She was known for her work in papier-mâché and ceramics, and as well as in painting. Her artwork became collector's items starting in the 1960s. She lived in Mexico City, Palos Verdes Estates, California, and Torrance, California for many years. Taccogna also went by the names Gemma Walker, Gemma Del Rio, and Gemma Sexton.

== Early life and education ==
Gemma Taccogna was born on May 9, 1923, in Bari, Apulia, Italy. She was the daughter of Giuseppe Taccogna and María Putingnano. She was around one year old when she moved with her family to Mount Vernon, New York. She graduated from Evander Childs High School in the Bronx.

Taccogna attended Cooper Union, and the Art Students League of New York. She studied under Marc Chagall, Eric Fromm, and William Zorach.

== Career ==
=== Mount Vernon, New York ===
In 1945, she married her high school classmate, Claude Walker, who had been enrolled the United States Army during World War II.

Taccogna worked as the director of the Mount Vernon Art Center in Mount Vernon, New York. She was active in showing her work at the Mount Vernon Art Association, from the late 1940s until the early 1950s. In 1949, her painting "Springtime Still Life" won first place at the Mount Vernon Art Association.

=== Mexico, 1954–1966 ===
In 1952, she married the Mexican medical doctor Juan Del Rio–Huidobro with whom she had three children. The family moved to Mexico in 1954.

When Taccogna arrived in Mexico in 1954, she already was a well-known artist in New York City. In the San Ángel neighborhood of Mexico City, she set up a studio to make papier-mache artworks. Her work was covered in Verna Cook's book Mexican Interiors, with photographs by Bob Schalkwijk. The studio, named Artes Gemma, had up to 60 employees. Peggy Guggenheim bought Gemma's art and exhibited it in her museum in Venice. Gemma's success gave the papier-mâché industry in Mexico a boost.

=== California and late life ===
In the mid 1960s, Taccogna married the American artist Fred Sexton (1907–1991), after his divorce from artist Gwain Noot Sexton. The family moved to Palos Verdes, California in 1966. Taccogna separated from Sexton in 1968 because of allegations of pedophilia and sexual abuse. When Taccogna confronted Sexton, he fled to Mexico. Sexton, who had been involved in an earlier abuse case of his friend George Hodel, seized the couple's Mexican estate and left Taccogna in financial trouble. The couple divorced in 1969 in Los Angeles, California.

For the next decade she lived in various places in the United States, including Las Vegas, Long Beach, and Del Mar. Taccogna moved to a condo in Torrance, California in 1994, and she continued teaching art classes until her death.

== Death and legacy ==
Taccogna died on May 8, 2007, at Little Company of Mary Hospital in Torrance, California. She was survived by her children and extended family, her daughter Gemma Del Rio and son Zen Del Rio are visual artists.

Collectors of Taccogna's work included Jacqueline Kennedy Onassis, Mary Tyler Moore, Burt Lancaster, and Anna Sui.

== Exhibitions ==
Taccogna's works participated in temporary exhibitions in the following museums and art galleries:

- Peggy Guggenheim Collection, Venice, Italy
- Museo del Palacio de Bellas Artes, Mexico City, Mexico
- Galería Antonio Souza, Mexico City, Mexico

== Books ==
- Taccogna, Gemma; Meilach, Mel (1978). Tile Decorating with Gemma. Crown Publishers. ISBN 0-517-52950-5. OCLC 3893075.
