= William Eugene Stanley =

American politician (1844–1910)

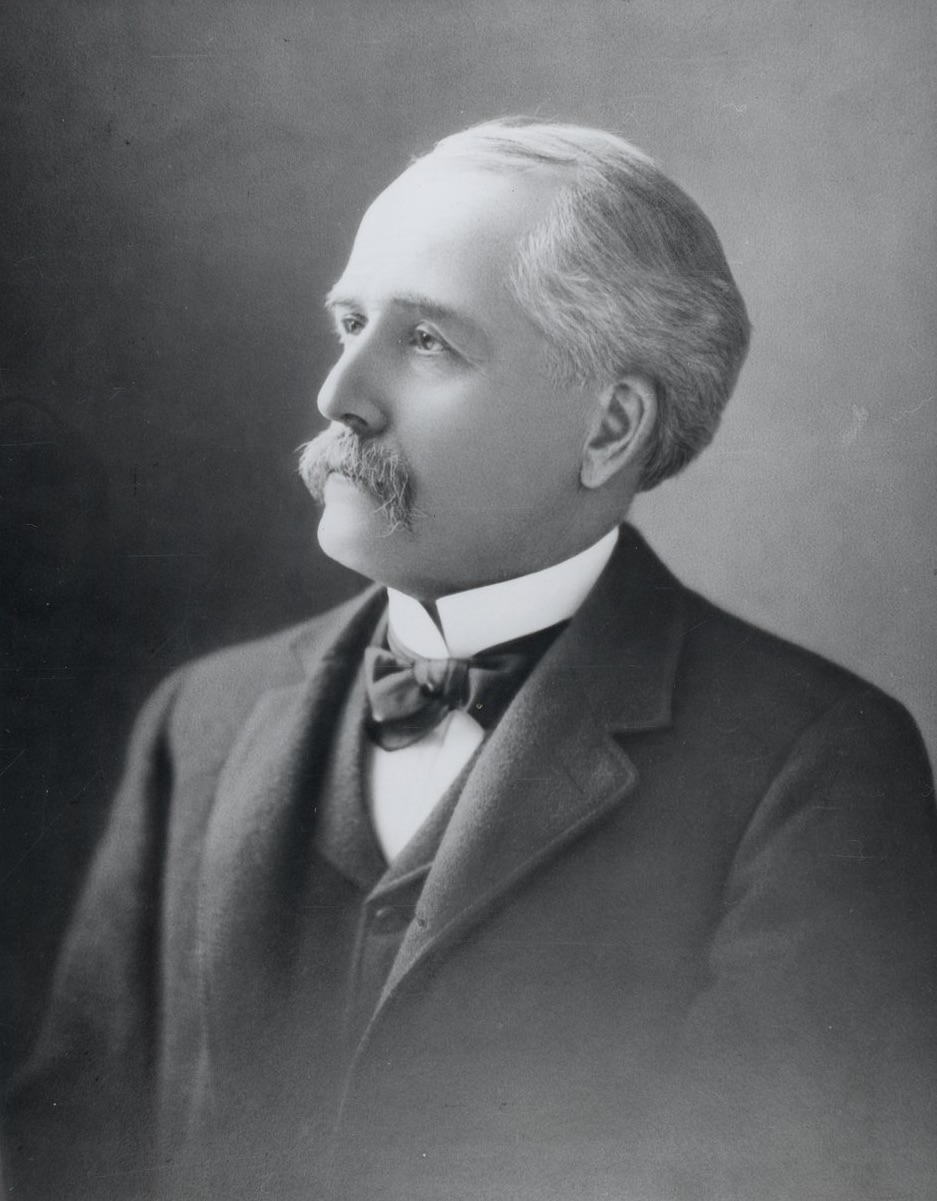
- Stanley c. 1899–1903

15th Governor of Kansas
- In office January 9, 1899 – January 12, 1903
- Lieutenant: Harry E. Richter
- Preceded by: John W. Leedy
- Succeeded by: Willis J. Bailey

Member of the Kansas House of Representatives
- In office 1881–1883

Personal details
- Born: December 28, 1844 Danville, Ohio, U.S.
- Died: October 13, 1910 (aged 65) Wichita, Kansas, U.S.
- Party: Republican
- Spouse: Emma Lenora Hillis
- Children: 4
- Education: Ohio Wesleyan University (attended)
- Profession: Attorney

William Eugene Stanley Sr. (December 28, 1844 – October 13, 1910) was an American lawyer and the 15th governor of Kansas.

== Biography ==
Born in Danville, Ohio, Stanley was the son of a physician, reared on a farm, and educated in the common schools of Hardin County, Ohio. He attended Ohio Wesleyan University, but left before he graduated. He studied in Kenton and Dayton, Ohio, and was admitted to the bar in Kenton, Ohio in 1868. He married Emma Lenora Hills and they had four children.

Arriving in Jefferson County, Kansas, in 1870, Stanley opened his practice and taught school in Perry. He served as county attorney from 1871 to 1872. He resigned that position and moved to Wichita, Kansas. He began practicing law and continued to do so except when in office. He served as Sedgwick County Attorney from 1874 to 1880. Elected to the Kansas House of Representatives, he served from 1881 to 1883.

In 1898, Stanley won the Republican gubernatorial nomination and upon winning the election, he was sworn in on January 9, 1899. Reelected to a second term, he left office on January 12, 1903. During his tenure, a US prison revolt at Fort Leavenworth and a 1901 convict strike were dealt with, a traveling library commission was authorized, and the state supreme court was increased to seven judges.

After leaving office, he returned to Wichita and his law practice. From 1903 to 1904, he served on the Dawes Commission to the Five Civilized Tribes.

Stanley died on October 13, 1910, in Wichita, Kansas, and is interred at Highland Cemetery in Wichita.

Party political offices
Preceded by Edmund Needham Morrill	Republican nominee for Governor of Kansas; 1898, 1900	Succeeded by Willis J. Bailey
Political offices
Preceded by John W. Leedy	Governor of Kansas; 1899–1903	Succeeded by Willis J. Bailey
