= Gwain Noot Sexton =

Canadian-born American author, illustrator, visual artist, fashion designer (1909–2007)

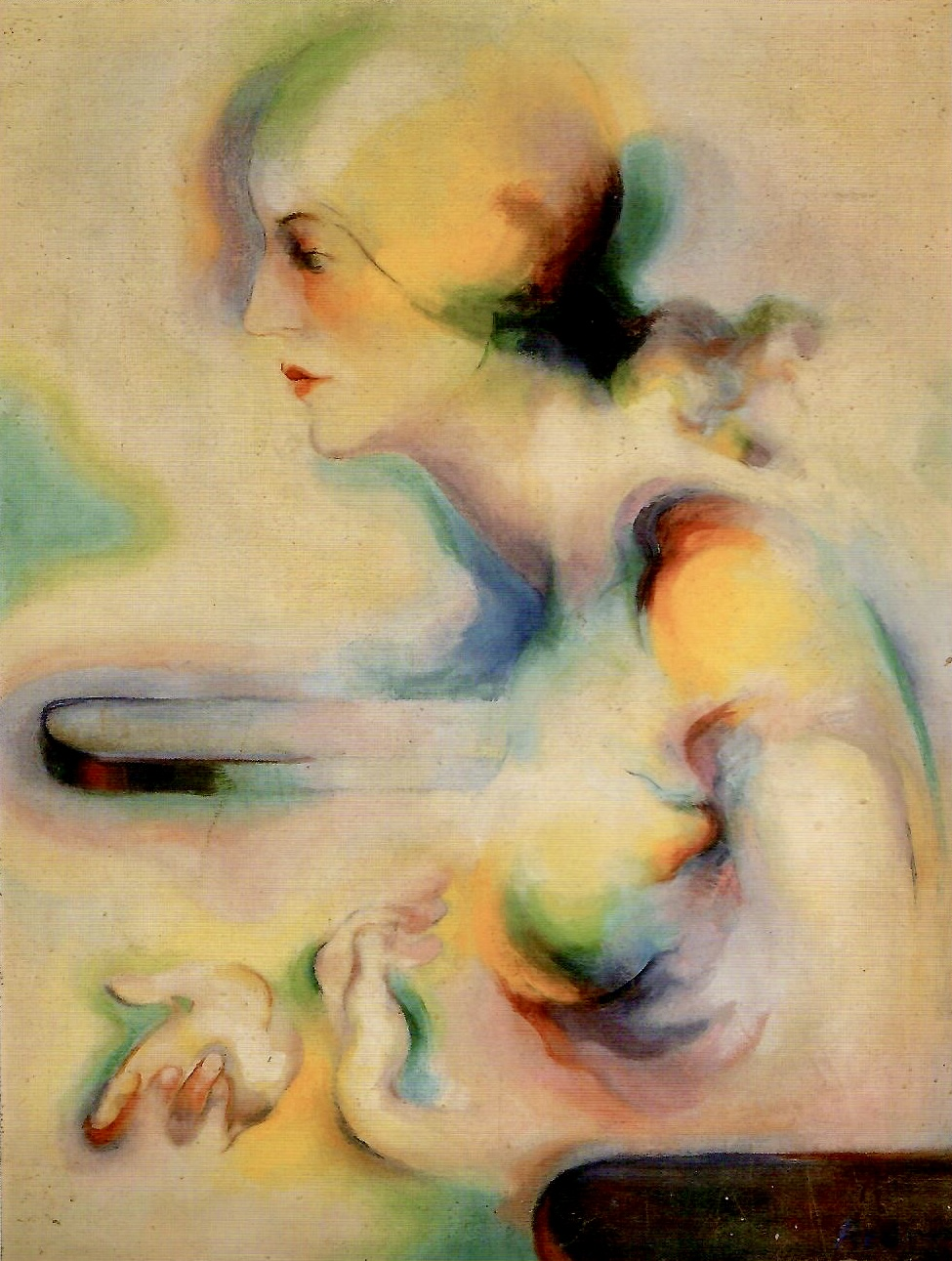
- Portrait of Gwain Noot Sexton (n.d., before 1942), by James M. Redmond
- Born: Gwain Harriette Noot; June 11, 1909; British Columbia, Canada
- Died: February 5, 2007 (aged 97); Redondo Beach, Los Angeles County, California, United States
- Education: Art Students League of Los Angeles
- Occupations: Children's book author, illustrator, visual artist, fashion designer
- Spouse(s): Fred Sexton (m. 1932–1960s; divorced)
- Children: 1

Gwain Noot Sexton (née Gwain Harriette Noot; 1909–2007) was a Canadian-born American children's book author, illustrator, visual artist, and fashion designer. She lived in Los Angeles County for most of her life.

== Early life ==
Gwain Harriette Noot was born on June 11, 1909, in British Columbia, Canada. She was raised in Vancouver, British Columbia, and attended the Model School in Vancouver.

She studied at the Art Students League of Los Angeles, where she met Fred Sexton. The couple married in June 1932, and briefly relocated to France after the marriage. Together they had one daughter. During her time at the Art Students League of Los Angeles, she also met painter James M. Redmond, who painted her portrait in oils.

== Career and late life ==
Her husband Fred Sexton was a witness in the 1949 incest trial of his friend Dr. George Hill Hodel, who was charged by LAPD with multiple counts of sexual abuse with his minor daughter, Tamar. Sexton later admitted his own involvement in the Hodel abuse case, and he took a plea agreement in exchange for his testimony against Dr. Hodel.

Sexton published her first children's book, Maxmilian the Unmerry; There Once Was a King (1959, Charles Scribner's Sons), which she both wrote and illustrated. The story is written in rhyme and is about a unpredictable king named Maxmilian, a wishing stone, and a mouse. Her book was reviewed by The New York Times, the Publishers Weekly, and other newspapers.

Her husband Fred started an importing business of folk art in Mexico in the early 1960s. She joined him in Mexico in 1963, and together they collaborated with local designer Tachi Castillo (1918–1999) on designing Bohemian-style folk dresses, which were imported to the United States. Fred divorced her sometimes in the mid-1960s, and remarried Italian-born artist Gemma Taccogna. Sexton continued her apparel business under the name Gwain Sexton after their divorce, and into the 1970s; and she highlighted the apparel label with Castillo's designs featuring Mexican lace and ruffles. She died on February 5, 2007, in Redondo Beach, California.

== Publications ==
- Sexton, Gwain (1959). Maxmilian the Unmerry; There Once Was a King. Gwain Sexton (illustrator). New York City, NY: Charles Scribner's Sons.
