= Bob Schalkwijk =

Dutch photographer (born 1933)

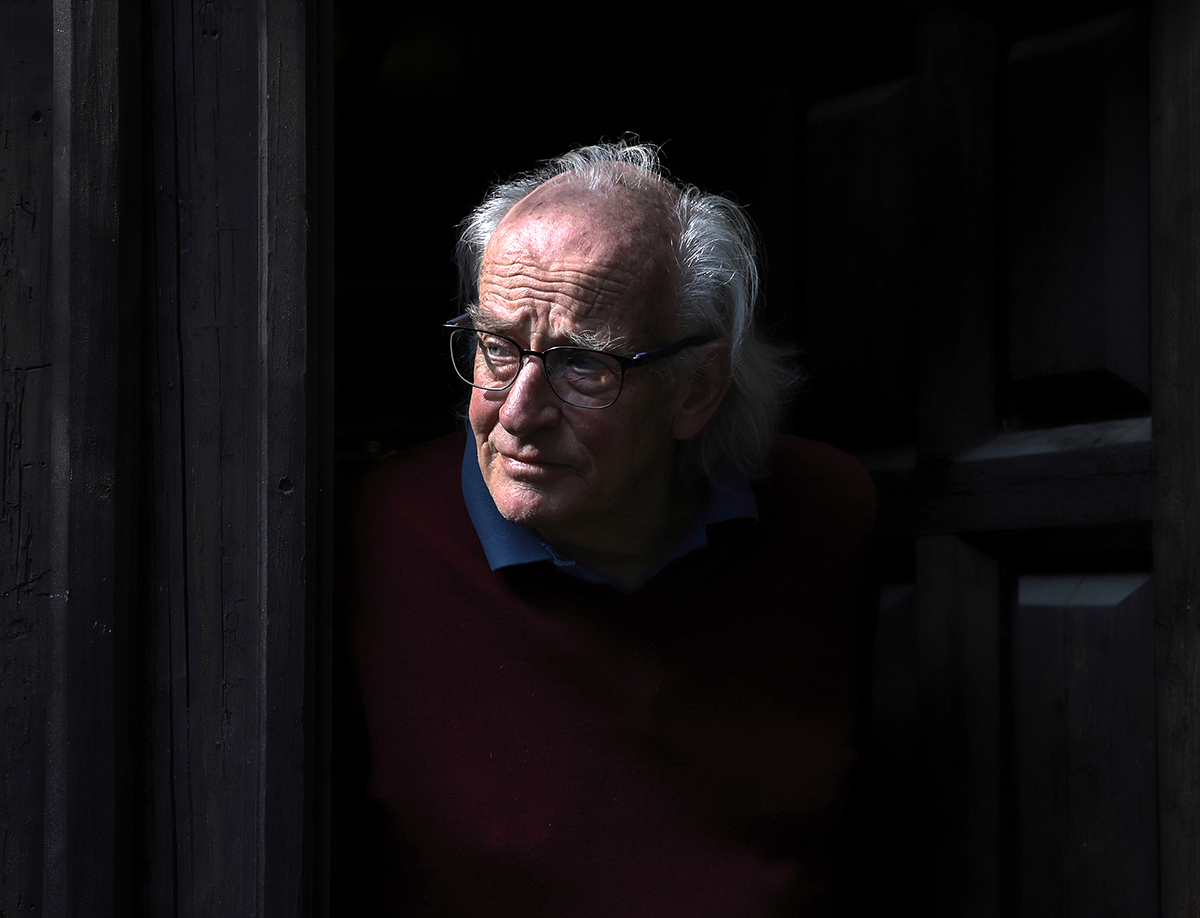
- Bob Schalkwijk in 2020
- Born: Benjamin Diederik Schalkwijk; May 6, 1933 (age 93); Rotterdam
- Known for: Photography
- Website: bobschalkwijk

Benjamin Diederik "Bob" Schalkwijk (born 6 May 1933) is a Dutch photographer who lives and works in Mexico since 1959. His lifestyle and travel photography has been called a graphic testimony of Mexico's identity, transformations and continuities. Notable is also his work in architecture and still life photography, especially of objects of art. His archive contains over 600,000 images with a digital catalogue that has obtained public and private funding for its development and dissemination.

== Life ==
=== Early years ===
==== The Netherlands ====
===== Family =====
Schalkwijk was born in Rotterdam on May 6, 1933 to trader Willem Schalkwijk and Sophia Vlielander Hein. Both parents came from patrician families. His mother was grandchild of lawyer and senator Benjamin Marius Vlielander Hein and Catharina Couperus, sister of writer Louis Couperus. His mother was first cousin of Benjamin Marius Telders. Schalkwijk's father and paternal grandfather were importers of vegetable oils. They were amateur photographers.

===== Education =====
As a child, Schalkwijk lived through World War II in Wassenaar. He was interested in photography from an early age. He studied the autochrome photographs made by his late grandfather J.P. Schalkwijk. Inspired by his passion, his father bought him a Kodak Brownie and built a darkroom where Schalkwijk spent many hours. The first pictures he was able to sell were made with a Pentax camera. They were concert images of Louis Armstrong in the Concertgebouw on November 2, 1952 when Schalkwijk was 19.

In Haarlem Schalkwijk went to the Hogereburgerschool-B, a science-oriented high school. His final exam in German was based on the book Agfacolor by Heinz Berger. Upon leaving high school, Schalkwijk had to do two years of military service. After that, he embarked on an oil tanker bound for New Orleans to learn how to build pipes for transporting liquids and shipped his Volkswagen Beetle for New York.

==== Road trip through the United States and Canada ====
In August 1957, upon arrival in the United States, Schalkwijk took an airplane to New York, picked up his car and started a road trip to fulfill his boyhood dream inspired by reading National Geographic. The trip took him to Houston where he registered for courses in oil pipe design. One of his colleagues prompted him to enroll in Stanford University to study oil engineering. He drove to San Francisco, passed the entry exams and before the start of classes, drove to Calgary in search for a job.

==== Mexico ====
An article in the March 1958 issue of Esquire prompted Schalkwijk to visit Ajijic, after which he continued the journey to Mexico-City to study Spanish. Here he made friends who encouraged him to make a living of photography. With Fred Mulders he travelled to the Mezquital Valley in August 1958 and became fascinated by the Otomi people. Schalkwijk returned to Stanford but his interest in oil technology had waned. Toward the end of 1958 he returned to Mexico-City to establish himself as a professional photographer.

== Career ==
=== Photography ===
Schalkwijk settled in San Angel in 1959. His neighbour Gemma Taccogna taught him to take pictures of children. These were easy to sell to their parents. She also asked him to take pictures of her papier-mâché artwork. Some of these pictures were later published in Mexican Interiors. He also photographed work by other young artists from the Taccogna group, such as Roger von Gunten and the Honduran sculptor Enrique Miralda. He joined the theater group of Elsie Escobedo, mother of his friend Miguel and sculptor Helen Escobedo. There he met Nina Lincoln, whom he married in 1962. Their honeymoon was to the Ixil region of Guatemala, because his father-in-law, Jackson Stewart Lincoln, had pioneered the study of the use of the ancient Mayan calendar among the Ixil people. This trip motivated them to form a photo archive and to devise a system to identify the films Schalkwijk used.

In the early years of his career, Schalkwijk could not make ends meet with his travel photography or by selling photographs of children to their parents. He took on corporate assignments with Black Star. One was to take pictures of a fertilizer factory in Monclova, Coahuila, and for this he bought a Plaubel Peco Supra II camera for 4 x 5” film, with which he made his first aerial shots. Schalkwijk worked at the Black Star photo agency until 1992.

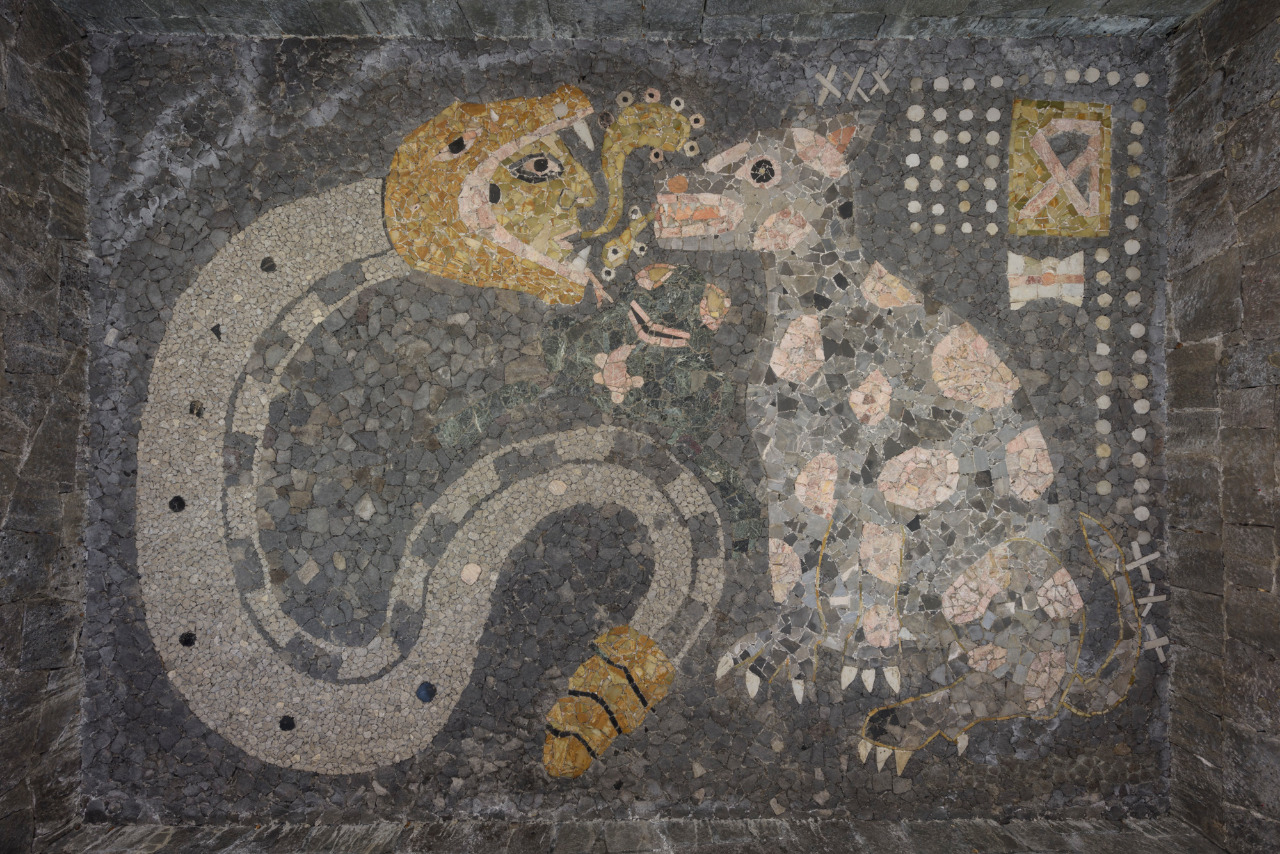
Mosaico Colado, Anahuacalli Museum. Photograph by Bob Schalkwijk

Schalkwijk continued to take photographs of works of art. He made more than 3,000 photos on medium format plates of works by the most important Mexican artists. Many of these are hosted at Artstor. It is common to find Schalkwijk's photographs in Mexican art publications, especially of the work of authors such as Frida Kahlo, David Alfaro Siqueiros, José Clemente Orozco and Diego Rivera. One example of his still life photography is the picture of Mosaico Colado, an archeological piece in the Anahuacalli Museum.

In 1965 he made the first of 17 trips to the Sierra Madre, where the Jesuit priest José Llaguno received him. He advised Schalkwijk to travel to Tehuerichi for the Easter week of the Tarahumara. Schalkwijk considers his portraits of the Tarahumara to be among his most relevant works. In 2019, the National Institute of Anthropology and History awarded him a medal of honor for the archive of his work on the Sierra Tarahumara and its inhabitants.

=== Book publications ===
In 1963 Schalkwijk was commissioned to take photos for the book about Mexico City in the series Famous Cities of the World, by Spring Books/Paul Hamlyn. It was his first major assignment. Schalkwijk and his wife planned the tours and places to shoot. In less than a year, Schalkwijk took about 8,000 photos, almost all in black and white, of the city's most famous places and most iconic buildings. The publication of the book in 1965 won him recognition as a photographer of architecture and urban landscapes. The Los Angeles Museum of Contemporary Art has a small collection of Schalkwijk's photographs of Centro Urbano Benito Juárez after the 1985 earthquake.

In 1975, together with the linguist Don Burgess, Schalkwijk published his first book with photos of his travels to the Sierra Tarahumara. Could you live like a Tarahumara? is considered one of the first photo books in Latin America. In 1979 and 1980 Schalkwijk co-authored two books with Patricia O'Gorman devoted to Mexican architecture, patios and gardens. In 1988 he made a book about Carlos Mérida and his work in the Juarez residential complex.

In 2015, Tarahumara (2014) received the Best Book Award in the Premier Print Award category from the Printing Industries of America association.

=== Exhibitions ===
In 2005 Schalkwijk gave up analog photography and switched to digital photography, while simultaneously starting to digitialze his photo archive. In collaboration with his son Adriaan and photography historian Gina Rodríguez, Schalkwijk has been leading a team dedicated to the preparation of exhibitions of photos from his archive.

In 2006 he presented his first major exhibition called Paisajes de Agua (Waterscapes), with large format photos from different parts of the world. The exhibition was presented at the Vasconcelos Library and at the Museo Nacional de Culturas del Mundo in Mexico City. Two years later, this exhibition was presented at the Ángeles Espinosa Yglesias Modern Art Gallery in Puebla; in 2010 at the Olachea Gallery in La Paz and in 2022 at the Seminario de la Cultura in Mexico City.

Schalkwijk also participated in the photographic installation QF - Photographic Quetzalcóatl by his son Pim Schalkwijk, composed of photographs depicting Mexico's cultural and natural diversity. The QF has toured several cities in Mexico since 2013.

In 2017 Schalkwijk presented an exhibition of his first 15 years as a photographer with a museography of his son Adriaan. Using the same museographic model, Schalkwijk presented an exhibition in 2019 about the women of the state of Hidalgo.

In 2022 Schalkwijk staged an exhibition in the Rejas (fences) gallery of the Bosque de Chapultepec called Bob Schalkwijk. History, art and nature, six decades of photos. The exhibition shows the history of this urban forest in 144 large-format photos.

== List of publications (selection) ==
- 1965 Mexico City: Famous Cities of the World
- 1975 Could you live like a Tarahumara?
- 1979 Patios and Gardens of Mexico
- 1984 Mexico 75 years: 1910-1985
- 1988 Chapultepec: History and Present
- 1991 Diego Rivera: Murals
- 2013 Tradition of craftsmanship in Mexican homes
- 2014 Tarahumara
- 2022 Chapultepec

== List of exhibitions (selection) ==
- 2006 Vasconcelos Library, Mexico City: Paisajes de Agua (Waterscapes). The exhibition was also shown in 2007 in Ciudad Bolivar, Venezuela, and in 2022 in the Seminario de la Cultura Mexicana.
- 2014 National Museum of Anthropology and History: Quetzalcóatl Photographic Installation.
- 2015 Jardin Borda Cultural Center: Morelos seen by Bob Schalkwijk
- 2017 Museo de las Culturas del Mundo: Bob Schalkwijk, A Dutchman in Mexico. Photo archive 1958-1973
- 2019 Hidalgo Centro para las Artes: Travesías, a Dutchman in Hidalgo
- 2022 Open Gallery of Chapultepec: Chapultepec. Bob Schalkwijk. History, art and nature.
- 2024 Fototeca Veracruz: De adentro hacia afuera.
- 2024 Westergasfabriek, photo fair Unseen Amsterdam.

== Awards ==
- 2015 Best book in the category Premium Print Awards of the Printing Association of America, for Tarahumara (2014)
- 2019 Medalla al Mérito Fotográfico, Instituto Nacional de Antropología e Historia
