= Edmund Needham Morrill =

American politician (1834–1909)

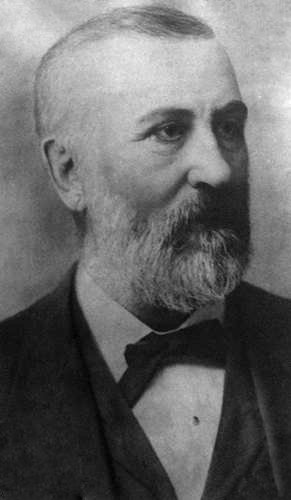

13th Governor of Kansas
- In office January 14, 1895 – January 11, 1897
- Lieutenant: James Armstrong Troutman
- Preceded by: Lorenzo D. Lewelling
- Succeeded by: John W. Leedy

Member of the U.S. House of Representatives from Kansas
- In office March 4, 1883 – March 3, 1891
- Preceded by: William A. Phillips (AL); John A. Anderson (1st)
- Succeeded by: District eliminated (AL); Case Broderick (1st)
- Constituency: At-large district (1883-85); 1st district (1885-91)

Member of the Kansas Senate
- In office 1872

Personal details
- Born: February 12, 1834 Westbrook, Maine, U.S.
- Died: March 14, 1909 (aged 75) San Antonio, Texas, U.S.
- Resting place: Mount Hope Cemetery, Hiawatha, Kansas
- Party: Republican
- Spouses: Elizabeth A. Brettun (m. 1862; died 1868) Caroline Jenkins Nash (m. 1869)
- Education: Westbrook Academy
- Profession: Soldier, teacher

Military service
- Allegiance: United States (Union)
- Branch/service: United States Army
- Years of service: 1861–1865
- Rank: Major
- Unit: Company C, 7th Kansas Cavalry Regiment
- Battles/wars: American Civil War

Edmund Needham Morrill (February 12, 1834 – March 14, 1909) was a U.S. representative from Kansas and the 13th governor of Kansas.

== Biography ==
Edmund Needham Morrill was born in Westbrook, Maine, to Rufus and Mary (Webb) Morrill. He attended the common schools at Westbrook Academy and learned the trade of tanning from his father. At the age of 23, he moved to Kansas.

In 1861, he enlisted as a private in Company C, 7th Kansas Cavalry. Within a year, he was a captain, and by 1865 he was a major.

After the Civil War, he entered the banking business and remained in that business for the rest of his life.

Morrill married twice, first to Elizabeth A. Brettum whom he married on November 27, 1862. Elizabeth died November 1868 at Hiawatha, Kansas. Morrill's second wife was Caroline Jenkins Nash, whom he married December 25, 1869. They had three children, all born at Hiawatha.

In 1866, he was elected clerk of the district court. In 1872, he was elected to the Kansas Senate. He was elected to the United States House of Representatives in 1882, serving four two-year terms before declining another, announcing instead his retirement from politics. Nevertheless, at the urging of his friends, he accepted the nomination for governor of Kansas in 1894 and served one term, being defeated in 1896.

In 1894, The Advocate newspaper exposed several questionable land deals that Morrill orchestrated in connection with the Denver City railroad company. Morrill's tax records show he purposely misrepresented his assessment on property to avoided paying taxes that he had taken from victims of his land schemes. He was called, "the most cold-blooded schemer that ever posed for public favors".

Morrill died March 14, 1909, in San Antonio, Texas, and is buried in Hiawatha's Mount Hope Cemetery.

Party political offices
Preceded by Abram W. Smith	Republican nominee for Governor of Kansas; 1894, 1896	Succeeded by William Eugene Stanley
U.S. House of Representatives
Preceded by Seat created	Member of the U.S. House of Representatives from Kansas's at-large congressional district 1883–1885	Succeeded by Seat eliminated
Preceded by John A. Anderson	Member of the U.S. House of Representatives from Kansas's 1st congressional district 1885–1891	Succeeded by Case Broderick
Political offices
Preceded by Lorenzo D. Lewelling	Governor of Kansas; 1895–1897	Succeeded by John W. Leedy
