= Fred Sexton =

American artist (1907–1995)

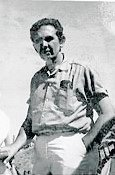
- Born: Frederick Rafael Sexton; June 3, 1907; Goldfield, Nevada, United States
- Died: September 11, 1995 (aged 88); Guadalajara, Mexico
- Occupations: Painting, sculpture, educator
- Known for: Maltese Falcon statuette prop (1941)
- Spouse(s): Gwain Harriette Noot (m. 1932–1960s; divorce), Gemma Taccogna (m. 1960s–1969; divorce)

Fred Sexton (June 3, 1907 – September 11, 1995) was an American artist and creator of the Maltese Falcon statuette prop for the 1941 Warner Bros. film production, The Maltese Falcon.

During the 1930s and 1940s, Sexton was championed by Los Angeles Times Art Critic Arthur Millier, and his work was collected by Los Angeles-area art collectors including actor Edward G. Robinson and movie director John Huston.

Sexton also taught and led the Art Students League of Los Angeles between 1949 and 1953.

== Early life ==
Fred Rafael Sexton was born on June 3, 1907, in Goldfield, Nevada, to parents Pauline Magdalena (née Jaffe) and Jeremiah "Jerry" Sexton. He was of Irish, Jewish, and Italian descent. Sexton completed his first painting while still an adolescent.

== Career and exhibitions ==
In 1929, Los Angeles Times art critic Arthur Millier viewed a small self-portrait by Sexton at a Los Angeles County Museum of Art show called “The Younger Painters.” Millier wrote that the "special hero of the moment seems to us to be one James (sic) Sexton… He transcends the ordinary sounding subject matter, making of this tiny panel a painting at once decoratively beautiful and highly expressive."

Sexton commenced studies under Stanton Macdonald-Wright at the Art Students League of Los Angeles, where he met Gwain Harriette Noot. The couple married in June 1932, and briefly relocated to France, where Sexton studied briefly with Morgan Russell. The Sextons had a child and Gwain and the baby returned to the U.S. in 1933. In 1935, Fred returned to the U.S. after a trip to Italy.

In 1935, Sexton’s paintings were exhibited at the Stendahl Galleries in Los Angeles. A Los Angeles Times review described Sexton’s work as “first-rank museum quality done by an almost unknown Los Angeles painter…masterpieces of the highest order.” Following "whistle stops" with the Treasury Relief Art Project (TRAP) program during 1936 and 1937, Sexton had a show at the Jacob Zeitlin Bookshop in Los Angeles in 1938.

During World War II, Sexton taught art, worked for several film studios, and drove a taxi to support his family. In 1939, Sexton taught evening art classes with Archie Garner, and during the 1940s, he taught at Jepson Art Institute, California School of Design (Los Angeles), and Chouinard School of Art (later Chouinard Art Institute).

Sexton gained recognition for his floral delineations, still life, portrait, and architectural compositions. Many prominent Los Angelinos collected his works, including Edward G. Robinson, John Huston, Paulette Goddard, and the Hollywood patron Ruth Maitland. According to the Los Angeles Times, Edward G. Robinson had "bought and hung among his famous Cézannes, Van Goghs and Renoirs three new paintings...from the brush of Los Angeles artist Fred Sexton." In May and June 1941, three of Sexton’s paintings were included in a Los Angeles Museum exhibition of 56 paintings including important French Impressionists and Post-Impressionists from the collection of Mr. and Mrs. Edward G. Robinson.

In 1947, Sexton's paintings were featured in an exhibition at the John Decker Gallery in Los Angeles. In 1949, Sexton was invited to exhibit at the 21st Biennial Exhibition at the Corcoran Gallery of Art, Washington, D.C. Also in 1949, Sexton decided to revive the dormant Art Students League in Los Angeles, which reopened on September 20. Classes were held until 1953.

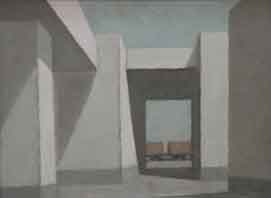
Los Angeles River Series (ca. 1940s)

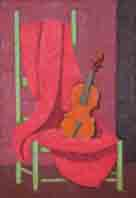
Violin study (ca. 1940s)

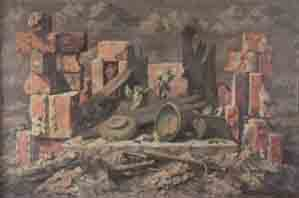
Still life (ca. 1940s)

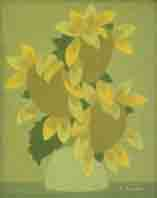
Still life (ca. 1940s)

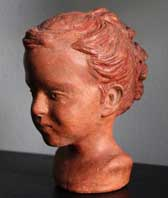
Bust of a young girl (ca. 1930s)

== The Maltese Falcon movie prop ==
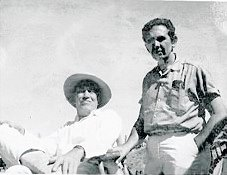
Fred Sexton and The Maltese Falcon director John Huston (ca. 1960)

In August 2013, Michele Fortier, the daughter of Fred Sexton, was interviewed on camera by UCLA professor Vivian Sobchack. Fortier recounted her father’s creation of the Maltese Falcon prop model for the Warner Bros. production of “The Maltese Falcon” in 1941, as well as visits to the film set where she interacted with actors Humphrey Bogart and Sydney Greenstreet, and director John Huston.

Fortier recalled that her father made “preliminary sketches” for the Maltese Falcon prop on a “manila envelope,” and then sculpted the model for the prop in clay. During visits to the film set, she remembered seeing a prop that was “shiny and black,” but “not like patent leather shoes.”

Fortier also identified initials inscribed in the right rear tail feather of a plaster Maltese Falcon prop owned by Hank Risan as her father’s. Fortier explained that she owns many of her father’s paintings and commented that many of the signatures feature the same idiosyncratic characteristics.

== Hodel and 1949 incest trial ==
Sexton from his teen years in the 1920s until 1950 was a close friend of both John Huston and George Hodel. All three grew up together in Los Angeles.

Sexton was a witness in the 1949 incest trial of Dr. Hodel who was charged by LAPD with multiple counts of sexual intercourse and sexual abuse with his daughter, Tamar Hodel, then age 14. Sexton admitted his involvement in the sexual assault and claimed he too attempted to have sex with Tamar along with George Hodel and two adult females at Hodel's Sowden/Franklin House at 5121 Franklin Ave. Sexton claimed he did not actually penetrate Tamar and he took a plea agreement in exchange for his testimony against Dr. Hodel and subsequent to his testimony at Hodel's jury trial was allowed to plead to a lesser crime of "contributing to the delinquency of a minor."

== Late life and death ==
Afterwards, Sexton operated an import business in the late 1950s, traveling frequently to Mexico. His wife Gwain joined him in Mexico in 1963, and together they collaborated with local artisan Tachi Castillo on designing folk dress, which were imported to the United States. He divorced his first wife.

Sexton remarried in the 1960s and his second wife, Gemma Taccogna, was also a successful artist. The couple bought and resided in Palos Verdes Estates, California. Gemma alleged her husband, Fred Sexton molested his 11-year-old step-daughter, a child, also named Gemma, who was Taccogna's daughter from a former marriage. Upon being confronted by his second wife, Sexton emptied their joint bank account and fled to Mexico. The couple divorced in 1969 in Los Angeles.

In Mexico in 1971, Sexton at age sixty-three, married a young woman in Guadalajara, Mexico. Sexton died in Guadalajara, Mexico on September 11, 1995, at age 88. His final instructions to his wife were to "destroy all my personal effects," and she complied.
