= John W. Leedy =

American politician (1849–1935)

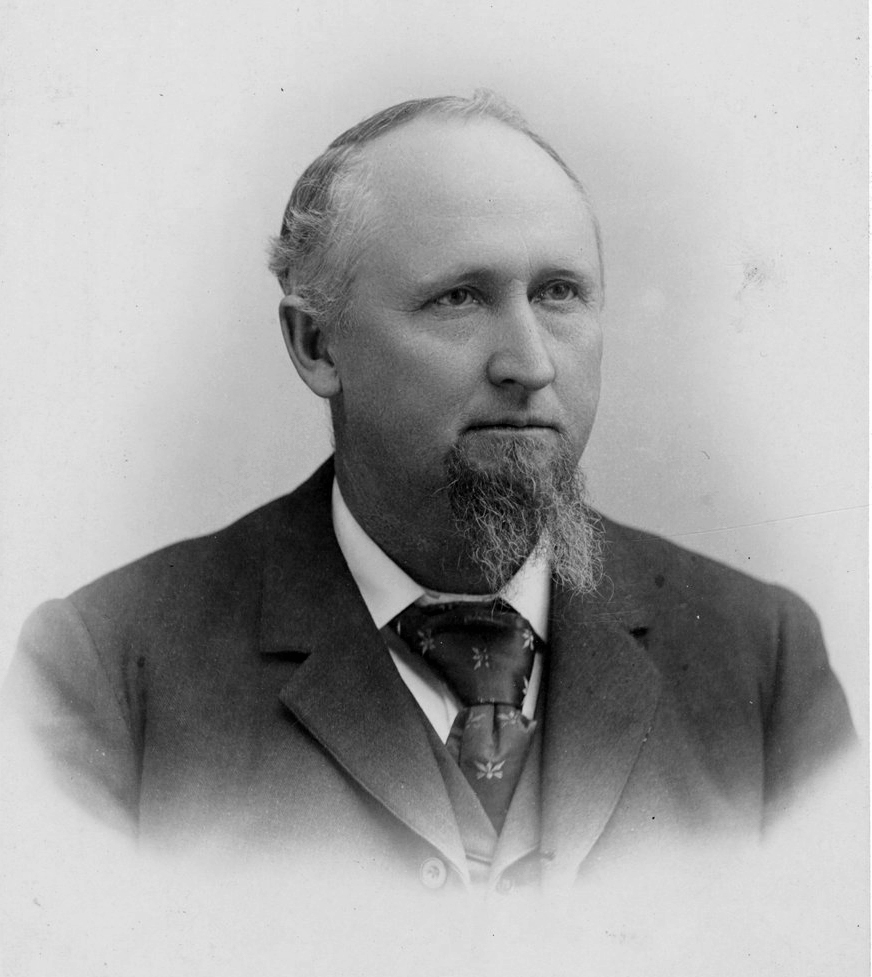

14th Governor of Kansas
- In office January 11, 1897 – January 9, 1899
- Lieutenant: Alexander Miller Harvey
- Preceded by: Edmund N. Morrill
- Succeeded by: William E. Stanley

Personal details
- Born: John Whitnah Leedy; March 8, 1849 Richland County, Ohio, U.S.
- Died: March 24, 1935 (aged 86) Edmonton, Alberta, Canada
- Party: Populist
- Spouse: Sarah J. Boyd
- Profession: clerk, farmer, miner

John Whitnah Leedy (March 8, 1849 – March 24, 1935) was the 14th governor of Kansas, serving 1896 to 1898. He later was active in politics in Alaska and Alberta, Canada.

== Personal life and family ==
Leedy was born near Bellville, Ohio, in Richland County, to Samuel Keith and Margaret (Whitnah) Leedy, the fifth of six children. His parents were members of the Church of the Brethren (colloquially called "Tunkers" or "Dunkers" in the United States). Upon the death of his father in 1853, he went to work for neighbors as a farm hand. He was only able to briefly attend school during a few winters.

In 1863, Leedy attempted to join the Union Army, but was rejected because of his young age and the intervention of his mother. But in 1864, he essentially ran away from home, following the 163rd Ohio Infantry in which his cousin Jacob M. Leedy was captain of Company D.

After the Civil War, Leedy moved to Princeton, Indiana, where he served as a clerk in a store for three years. His health in decline, Leedy then moved to Carlinville, Illinois, and sought work as a farm hand. He worked for Squire Gore (later state auditor of Illinois), and within five years his health had returned and he had saved enough money to purchase his own farm. He married Sarah Jane Boyd (1851–1940) in 1874 and had three children: Clara Romaine (1876–1972), Alice May (1880–1964), and John Boyd (1880–1968).

Leedy moved to Coffey County, Kansas, near Le Roy in 1880, where he purchased land for a farm. His interest turned to horse breeding and he was known as a successful breeder. However, in 1890, his finances began to fail and during the Panic of 1893, Leedy was forced to turn over his farm and all improvements- including his home- to his creditors.

== American political career ==
Originally a Republican, he became a Democrat in 1872 before joining the Populist Party at its foundation.

In 1892, Leedy ran for the Kansas State Senate with both Populist Party and Democratic Party nominations. He was elected and served in the State Senate from 1892 until 1897.

At the Populist Party's 1896 convention, delegates chose Leedy as their gubernatorial nominee over Congressman William A. Harris. At the time of his nomination, Leedy was very poor and he and his family were renting a small house for $15 a month.

As a candidate of the Populist party, Leedy was elected governor of Kansas in January 1897, defeating the incumbent Republican governor Edmund N. Morrill. He served a two year term as governor. William Allen White described him as an "old mossback Jacksonian who snorts and howls because there is a bathtub in the State House." As Governor of Kansas, he established a state schoolbook commission and a state printing plant. He also organized four state regiments for service in the Spanish–American War. Leedy was known as an outspoken critic of privately owned railroads and other corporations. During his governorship he instituted a system of small rural banks. He supported Direct Legislation, giving voters the power to initiate legislation, recall elected representatives and other powers. In late 1898, members of the Populist Party denied him the nomination as candidate for governor.

In 1901, Leedy moved to Alaska, where he discovered a gold mine and consequently became very wealthy, and practiced law despite having no formal legal training. He served as mayor of Valdez for two years.

== Canadian life ==
Leedy moved to Alberta, Canada, in 1908. He took up a homestead near Whitecourt, named after his son-in-law. Leedy became a naturalized British subject, hence had political rights in Canada. He joined the United Farmers of Alberta in 1915.

He agitated for reform of Canada's banking system, seeking the institution of the system of small rural banks that he had helped establish in Kansas during his governorship.

W.L. Morton in his book "The Progressive Party in Canada" noted that Leedy "stumped" the province (giving speeches to rural gatherings from the tops of tree stumps) in the cause of cheap loans and local banks.

In 1917, when the UFA stood aloof from direct politics, Leedy became active in the Non-Partisan League. He ran for a seat in the Alberta Legislature in the 1917 Alberta general election as a candidate for the League in the electoral district of Gleichen. He received more than 16 percent of the vote but came in last behind Conservative candidate Fred Davis and the defeated Liberal incumbent John McArthur.

Leedy ran for a seat to the House of Commons of Canada as a Non-Partisan League candidate in the electoral district of Victoria in the 1917 federal election. He was again defeated in the three-way race, again finishing third behind anti-conscriptionist Laurier Liberal candidate William Henry White (the sitting MP who was re-elected) and the Conservative/Unionist candidate, former Alberta MLA James Holden.

Leedy was the author of What’s the Matter with Canada?, A discussion of the credit situation in Canada, published in Edmonton in 1916. In 1916 he was expected to run as a candidate the 1917 Alberta election but did not.

He was active in the United Farmers of Alberta after it decided to engage in direct politics in 1921 and was elected government. He and fellow farmer and bank reformer George Bevington pushed the UFA government to establish a government-owned bank but their efforts were stopped by the conservative UFA executive. He left the UFA.

At the age of 77, he ran as an Independent on a bank-reform platform in Edmonton in the 1926 provincial election but was not elected.

In 1930 he was author of The proposed provincial banking law for the province of Alberta, which states that it was "Prepared for attachment to petition as provided by the Direct Legislation Act of the Province of Alberta asking a plebiscite on the question of whether or not this proposed banking act shall be enacted into law in the Province of Alberta." The campaign was unsuccessful as Alberta never held a province-wide referendum on the question.

Leedy died in Edmonton, Alberta, on March 24, 1935, with almost no money or other assets. The Kansas State Legislature donated $1,000 to pay for his grave marker and his funeral expenses.

He is interred at the Edmonton Municipal Cemetery. His wife Sarah (deceased 1941), daughter Clara Leedy (deceased 1972), and her husband Walter White (deceased 1925) are buried nearby.

Party political offices
Preceded by Lorenzo D. Lewelling	Populist nominee for Governor of Kansas; 1896, 1898	Succeeded by John W. Breidenthal
Political offices
Preceded by Edmund N. Morrill	Governor of Kansas; 1897–1899	Succeeded by William E. Stanley
