= 1898 Kansas gubernatorial election =

- November 8, 1898
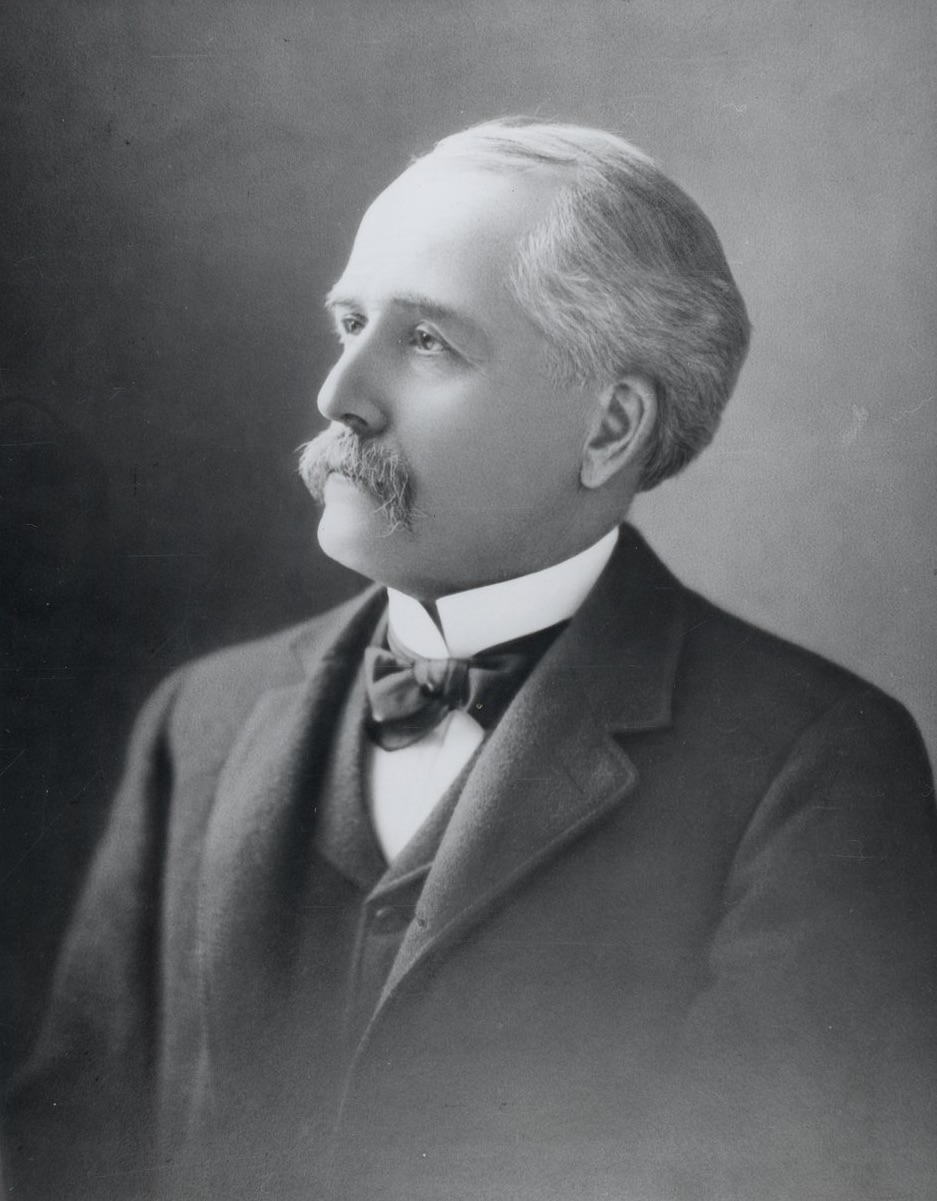

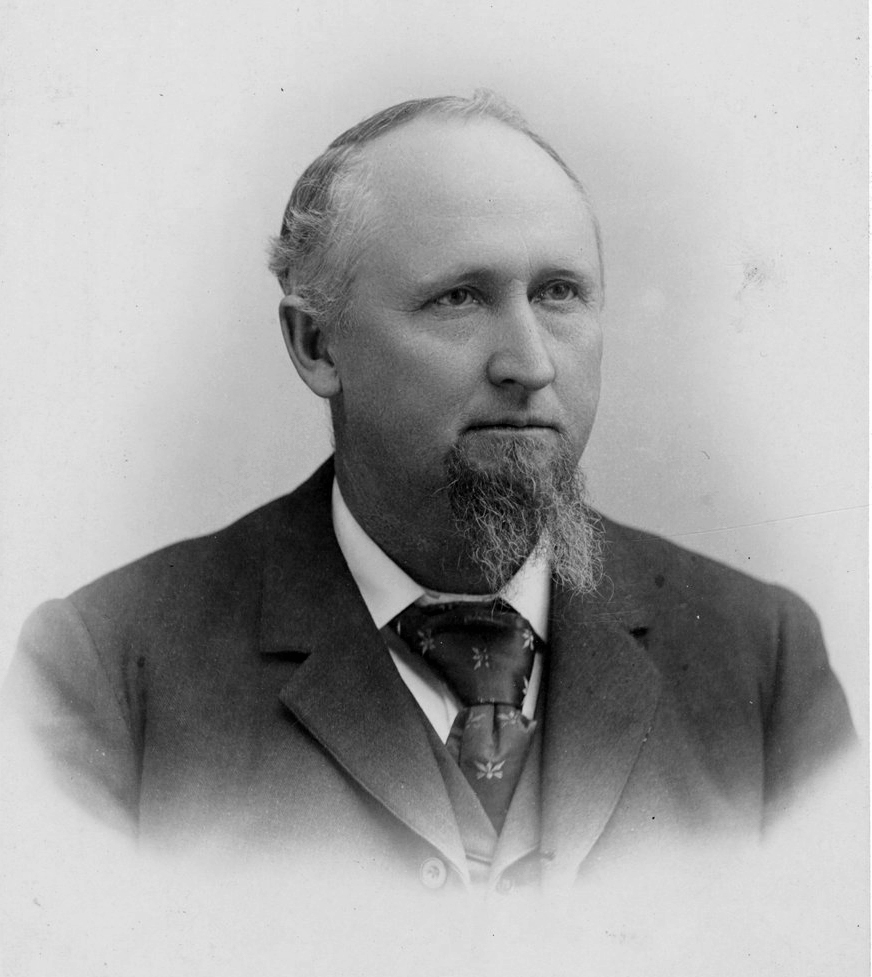
Nominee	William Eugene Stanley	John W. Leedy
Party	Republican	Populist
Popular vote	149,292	134,158
Percentage	51.81%	46.55%
- County results Stanley: 40–50% 50–60% 60–70% 70–80% Leedy: 40–50% 50–60% 60–70%
Governor before election
John W. Leedy
Populist
Elected Governor
William Eugene Stanley
Republican

The 1898 Kansas gubernatorial election was held on November 8, 1898. Republican nominee William Eugene Stanley defeated People's Party incumbent John W. Leedy with 51.81% of the vote.

== General election ==
=== Candidates ===
Major party candidates

- William Eugene Stanley, Republican

Other candidates

- John W. Leedy, People's Party
- William A. Peffer, Prohibition
- Caleb Lipscomb, Socialist Labor

=== Results ===
1898 Kansas gubernatorial election
Party	Candidate	Votes	%	±%
Republican	William Eugene Stanley	149,292	51.81%	
Populist	John W. Leedy (incumbent)	134,158	46.55%	
Prohibition	William A. Peffer	4,092	1.42%	
Socialist Labor	Caleb Lipscomb	635	0.22%	
Majority		15,134		
Turnout				
Republican gain from Populist		Swing		
