= 1894 Kansas gubernatorial election =

- November 6, 1894
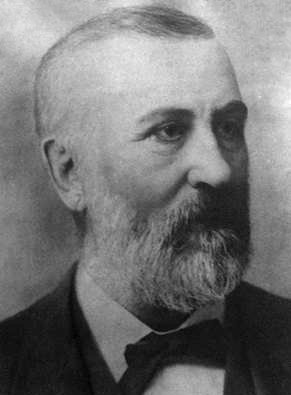

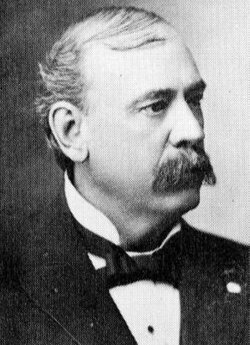

Nominee	Edmund Needham Morrill	Lorenzo D. Lewelling	David Overmyer
Party	Republican	Populist	Democratic
Popular vote	148,700	118,329	27,709
Percentage	49.53%	39.41%	9.23%
- County results Morrill: 40–50% 50–60% 60–70% Lewelling: 40–50% 50–60% Overmyer: 40–50%
Governor before election
Lorenzo D. Lewelling
Populist
Elected Governor
Edmund Needham Morrill
Republican

The 1894 Kansas gubernatorial election was held on November 6, 1894. Republican nominee Edmund Needham Morrill defeated People's Party incumbent Lorenzo D. Lewelling with 49.53% of the vote.

== General election ==
=== Candidates ===
Major party candidates

- Edmund Needham Morrill, Republican
- David Overmyer, Democratic

Other candidates

- Lorenzo D. Lewelling, People's
- I.O. Pickering, Prohibition

=== Results ===
1894 Kansas gubernatorial election
Party	Candidate	Votes	%	±%
Republican	Edmund Needham Morrill	148,700	49.53%	
Populist	Lorenzo D. Lewelling (incumbent)	118,329	39.41%	
Democratic	David Overmyer	27,709	9.23%	
Prohibition	I.O. Pickering	5,496	1.83%	
Majority		30,371		
Turnout				
Republican gain from Populist		Swing		
