= 1896 Kansas gubernatorial election =

- November 3, 1896
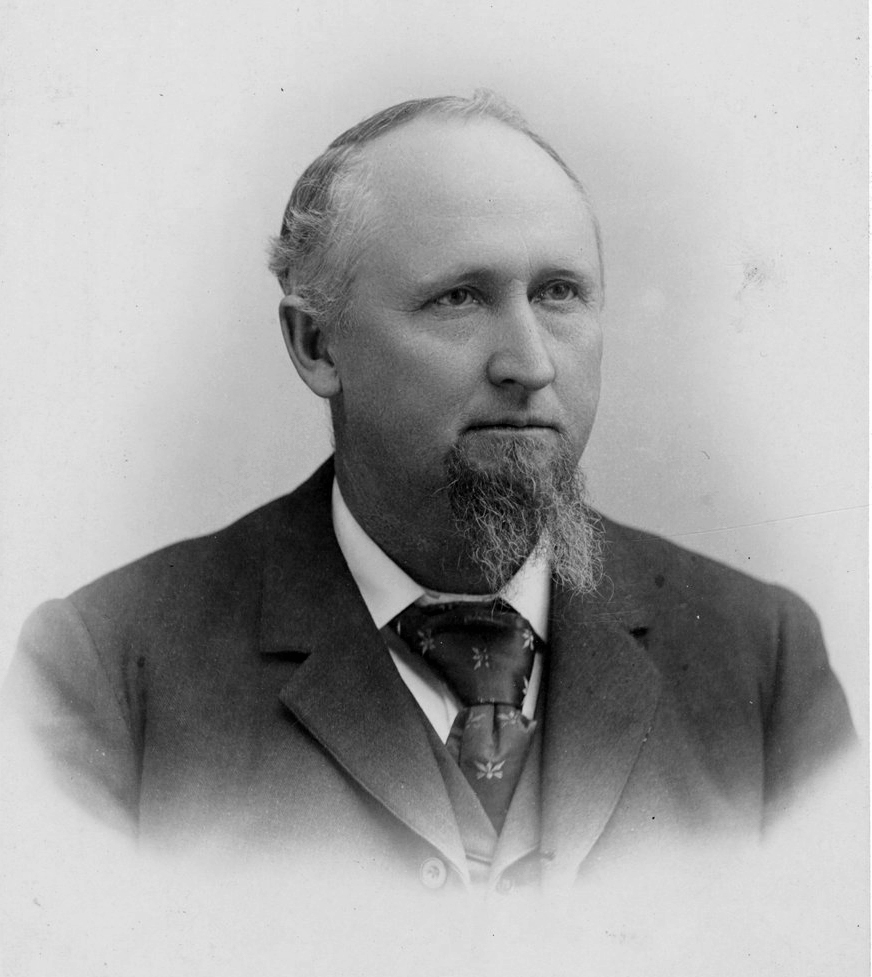

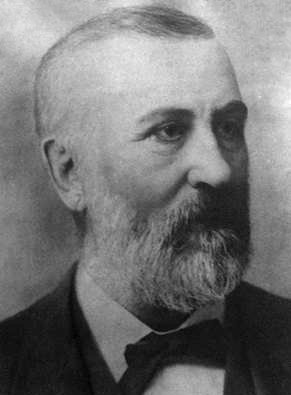
Nominee	John W. Leedy	Edmund Needham Morrill
Party	Populist	Republican
Popular vote	167,941	160,507
Percentage	50.55%	48.31%
- County results Leedy: 50–60% 60–70% Morrill: 40–50% 50–60% 60–70% Tie: 40–50%
Governor before election
Edmund Needham Morrill
Republican
Elected Governor
John W. Leedy
Populist

The 1896 Kansas gubernatorial election was held on November 3, 1896. People's Party nominee John W. Leedy defeated incumbent Republican Edmund Needham Morrill with 50.55% of the vote.

== General election ==
=== Candidates ===
Major party candidates

- Edmund Needham Morrill, Republican

Other candidates

- John W. Leedy, People's
- Horace Hurley, Prohibition
- Henry L. Douthart, National Prohibition
- A. E. Kepford, Independent Prohibition

=== Results ===
1896 Kansas gubernatorial election
Party	Candidate	Votes	%	±%
Populist	John W. Leedy	167,941	50.55%	
Republican	Edmund Needham Morrill (incumbent)	160,507	48.31%	
Prohibition	Horace Hurley	2,347	0.71%	
Independent	Henry L. Douthart	757	0.23%	
Independent	A. E. Kepford	703	0.21%	
Majority		7,434		
Turnout				
Populist gain from Republican		Swing		
