= 1892 Kansas gubernatorial election =

- November 8, 1892
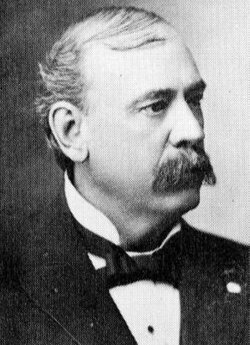

Nominee	Lorenzo D. Lewelling	Abram W. Smith
Party	Populist	Republican
Alliance	Democratic
Popular vote	162,507	158,075
Percentage	50.04%	48.67%
- County results Lewelling: 40–50% 50–60% 60–70% Smith: 40–50% 50–60% 60–70%
Governor before election
Lyman U. Humphrey
Republican
Elected Governor
Lorenzo D. Lewelling
Populist

The 1892 Kansas gubernatorial election was held on November 8, 1892. People's Party nominee Lorenzo D. Lewelling defeated Republican nominee Abram W. Smith with 50.04% of the vote.

== General election ==
=== Candidates ===
Major party candidates

- Abram W. Smith, Republican

Other candidates

- Lorenzo D. Lewelling, People's
- I.O. Pickering, Prohibition

=== Results ===
1892 Kansas gubernatorial election
Party	Candidate	Votes	%	±%
Populist	Lorenzo D. Lewelling	162,507	50.04%	
Republican	Abram W. Smith	158,075	48.67%	
Prohibition	I.O. Pickering	4,178	1.29%	
Majority		4,432		
Turnout				
Populist gain from Republican		Swing		
