= 1900 Kansas gubernatorial election =

- November 6, 1900
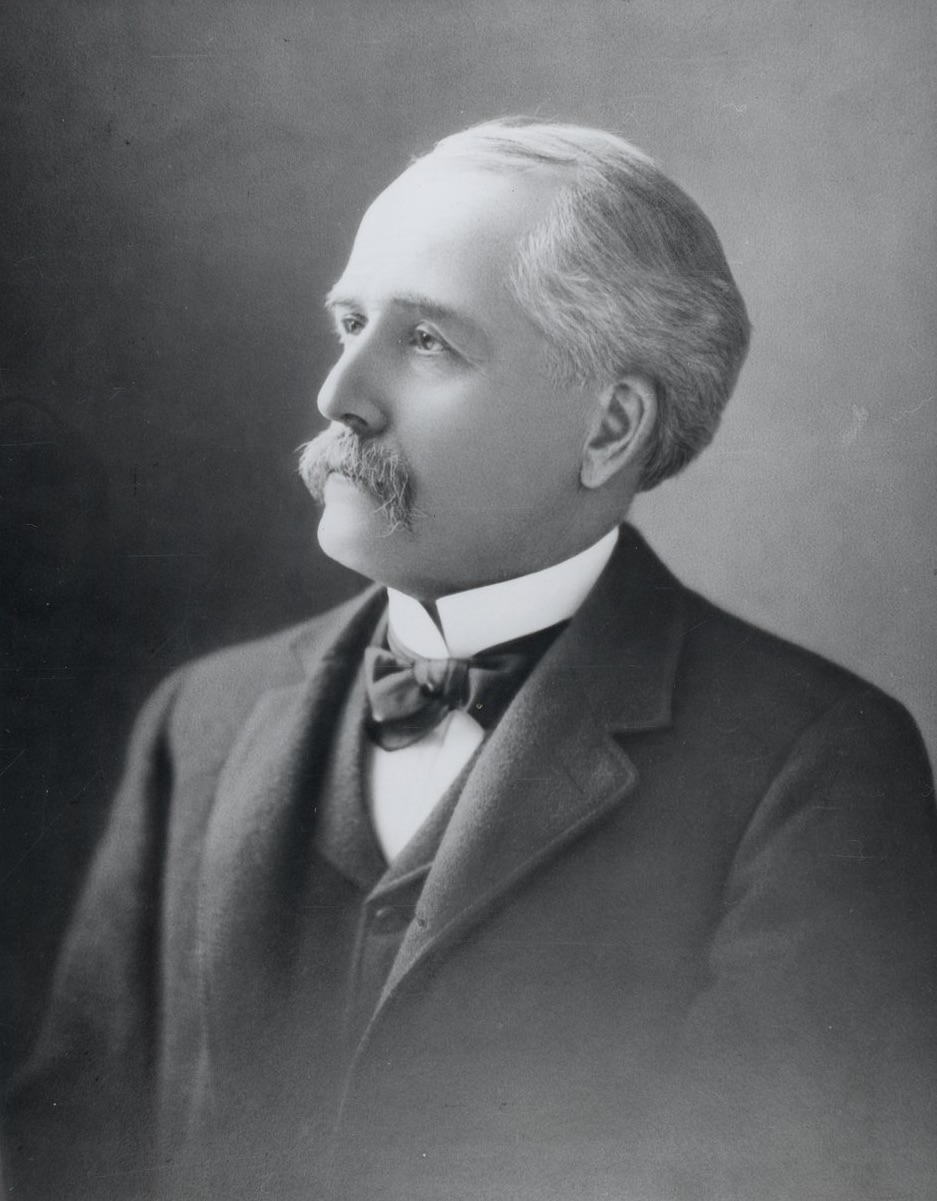

Nominee	William Eugene Stanley	John W. Breidenthal
Party	Republican	Populist
Popular vote	181,897	164,793
Percentage	52.25%	47.33%
- County results Stanley: 40–50% 50–60% 60–70% 70–80% Breidenthal: 40–50% 50–60% 60–70%
Governor before election
William Eugene Stanley
Republican
Elected Governor
William Eugene Stanley
Republican

The 1900 Kansas gubernatorial election was held on November 6, 1900. Incumbent Republican William Eugene Stanley defeated People's Party nominee John W. Breidenthal with 52.25% of the vote.

== General election ==
=== Candidates ===
Major party candidates

- William Eugene Stanley, Republican

Other candidates

- John W. Breidenthal, People's
- G. C. Clemens, Social Democratic
- Frank Holsinger, Prohibition

=== Results ===
1900 Kansas gubernatorial election
Party	Candidate	Votes	%	±%
Republican	William Eugene Stanley (incumbent)	181,897	52.25%	
Populist	John W. Breidenthal	164,793	47.33%	
Social Democratic	G. C. Clemens	1,258	0.36%	
Prohibition	Frank Holsinger	212	0.06%	
Majority		17,104		
Turnout				
Republican hold		Swing		
