= Governor L. D. Lewelling House =

Historic house in Kansas, United States

- Governor L.D. Lewelling House
- U.S. National Register of Historic Places
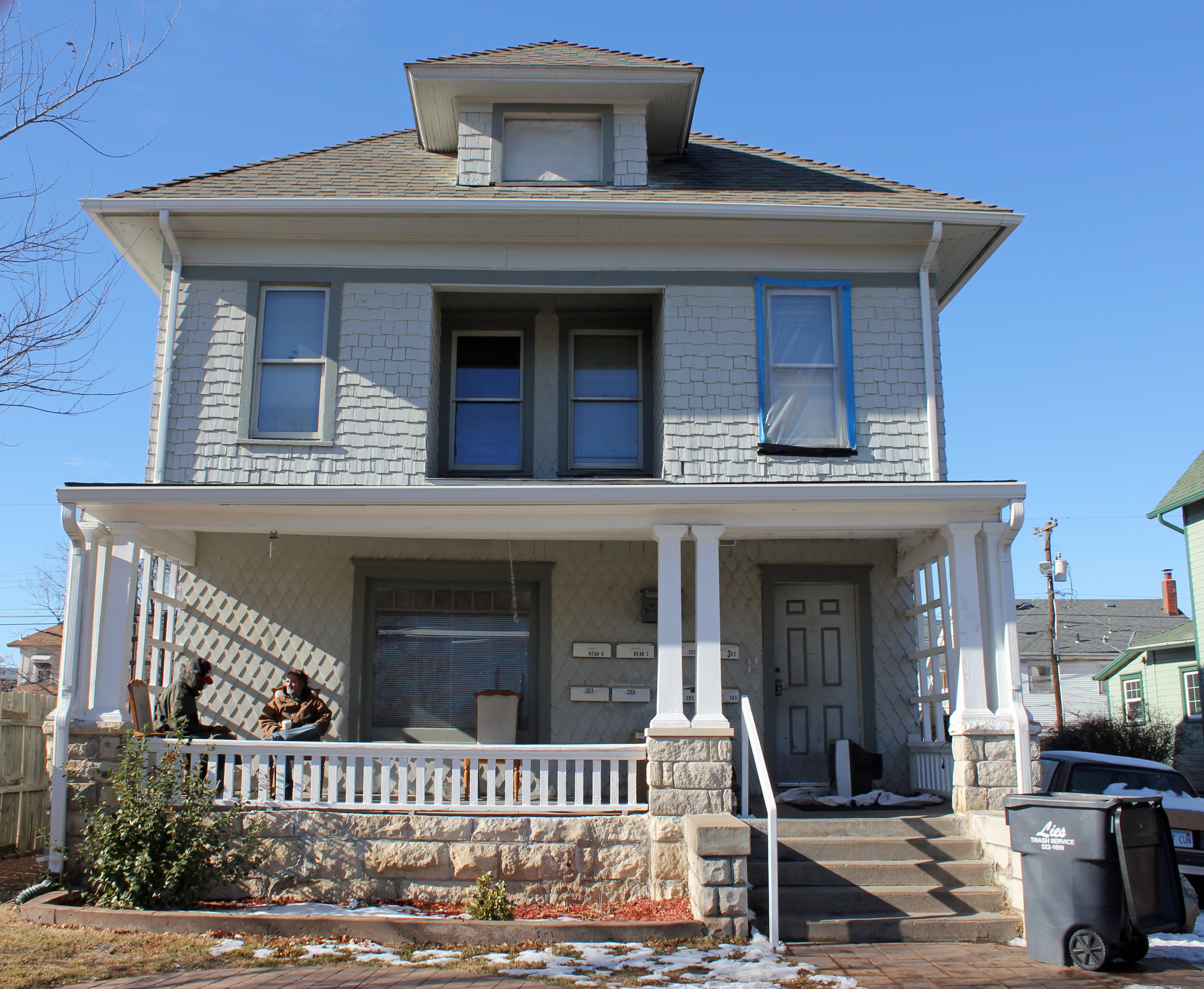
- The house in 2013.

- Location within Kansas Location within the United States
- Location: 1245 N. Broadway, Wichita, Kansas
- Coordinates: 37°42′20″N 97°20′8″W
- Area: less than one acre
- Built: c. 1894
- Architectural style: Colonial Revival
- NRHP reference No.: 05000547
- Added to NRHP: June 8, 2005

The Governor L.D. Lewelling House is a historic house located at 1245 North Broadway in Wichita, Kansas, United States. It was listed on the National Register of Historic Places on June 8, 2005.

== Description and history ==
The 2 1/2-story house was built in about 1894. It was deemed significant for its association with Lorenzo D. Lewelling while he served as governor of Kansas and architecturally as "a good example of a Colonial Revival-styled four square with Queen Anne and Shingle style influences."
