= Evander Childs Educational Campus =

Public school in New York City

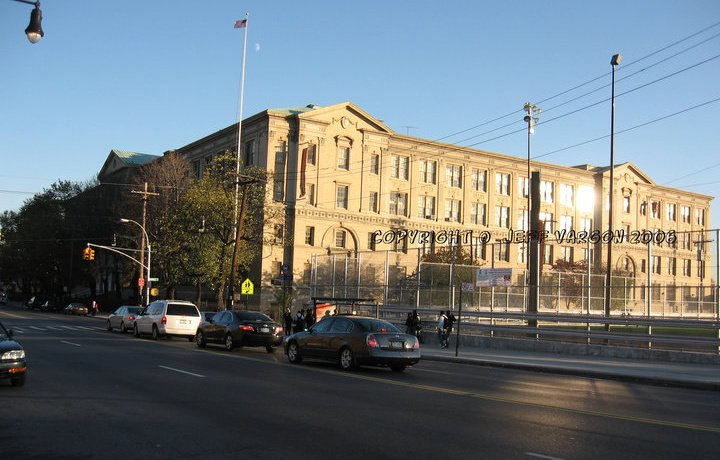
The former Evander Childs High School, part of the Evander Childs Educational Campus

Evander Childs Educational Campus is a cluster of public high schools located on the campus of the former Evander Childs High School in the Gun Hill section of The Bronx, New York City.

== History ==
The campus was named after Evander Childs, principal of Public School 10 in the Bronx who died at his work desk on April 11, 1912.

In 1938, James Michael Newell, working under the Public Works of Art Project and the Federal Art Project, painted eight murals titled The History of Western Civilization at the school.

As part of the mayor of the city's push of Bill & Melinda Gates Foundation's small schools initiative, Evander was labeled an "impact" school in 2008 and slated to be phased out not long afterward. Evander Childs High School was closed that year and split into six smaller, specialized schools. The campus is located at 800 East Gun Hill Road.

The New York City Department of Education operates five public high schools on the Evander Childs campus:

- Bronx Academy of Health Careers (X290)
- Bronx Aerospace High School (X545)
- Bronx Lab School (X265)
- High School for Contemporary Arts (X544)
- High School of Computers and Technology (X275)

== Notable alumni ==
- Doris Belack (1926-2011), American actress
- Philip D'Antoni (1919–2018), American film and television producer best known for producing the Academy Award-winning film The French Connection
- Nicolas Flagello (1928-1994), Italian-American composer, conductor and professor of music at the Manhattan School of Music
- Harry Helmsley (1909–1997), an American real estate billionaire whose company, Helmsley-Spear, owned the Empire State Building
- Evan Hunter (1926–2005), a pen name of Salvatore Albert Lombino, American author and screenwriter. He wrote the 87th Precinct police novels under the pen name Ed McBain ("Evan Hunter" may have been taken from Evander Childs High School and Hunter College)
- Paul McGrath (1904–1978), American actor
- Howard Raiffa (1924–2016), American statistician and decision theorist
- Carl Reiner (1922–2020), American actor, comedian, director, screenwriter, and author whose career spanned seven decades
- Jack Shapiro (1907–2001), American football player for the Staten Island franchise of the early National Football League, noted for being the shortest player in NFL history
- Gemma Taccogna (1923–2007), Italian-born American visual artist

== See also ==
- List of high schools in New York City
