= The Maltese Falcon (1941 film) =

1941 film by John Huston

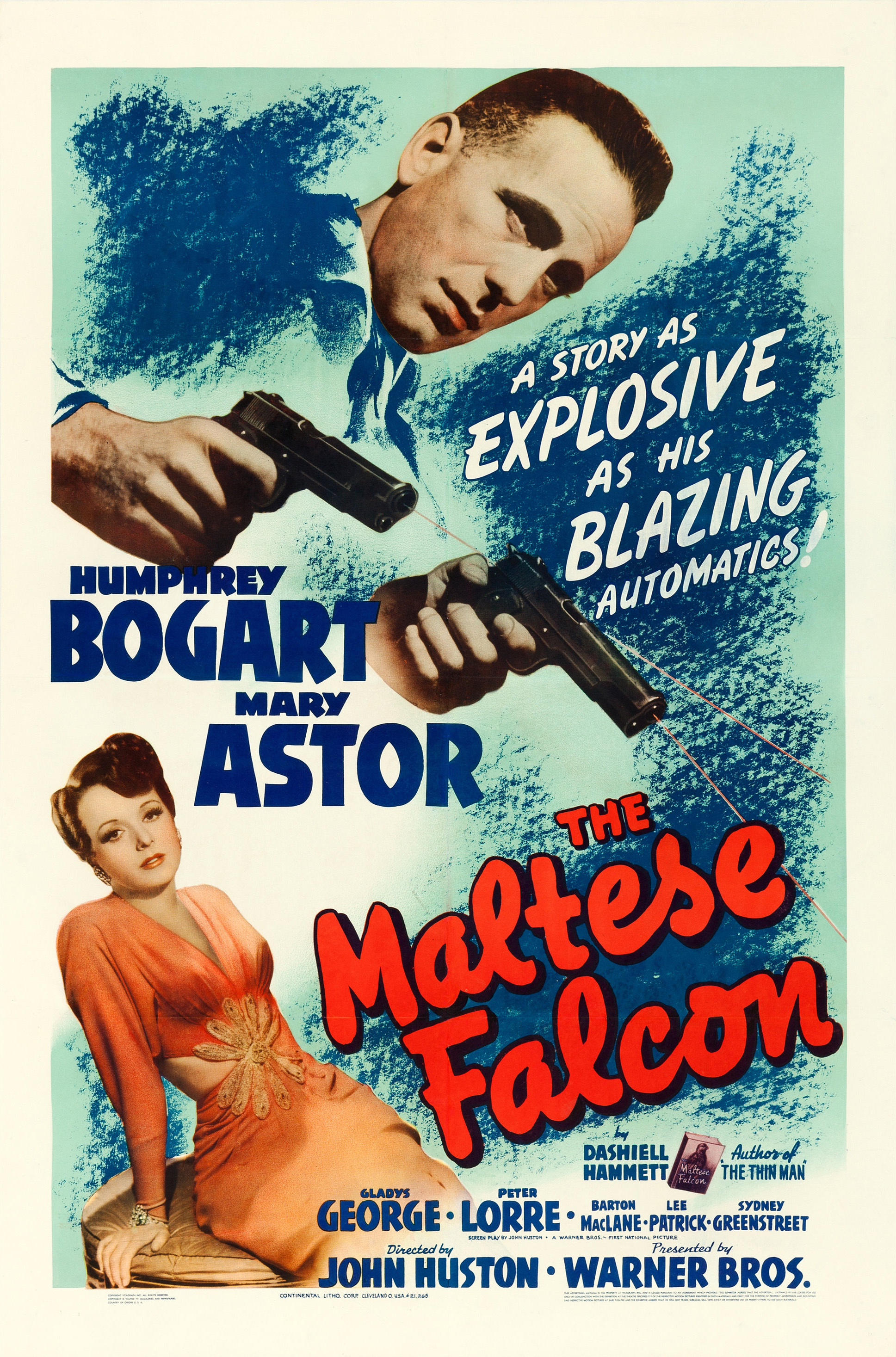
- Theatrical release poster
- Directed by: John Huston
- Screenplay by: John Huston
- Based on: The Maltese Falcon by Dashiell Hammett
- Starring: Humphrey Bogart; Mary Astor; Gladys George; Peter Lorre; Barton MacLane; Lee Patrick; Sydney Greenstreet
- Cinematography: Arthur Edeson (Note: Ernest Haller did reshoots for the opening scene.)
- Edited by: Thomas Richards
- Music by: Adolph Deutsch
- Production company: Warner Bros. Pictures
- Distributed by: Warner Bros. Pictures
- Release dates: October 3, 1941 (New York City); October 18, 1941 (United States)
- Running time: 101 minutes
- Country: United States
- Language: English
- Budget: $375,000 (Note: The American Film Institute claims the budget was $381,000.)
- Box office: $1.8 million

The Maltese Falcon is a 1941 American film noir written and directed by John Huston, marking Huston's directorial debut. It is the third film adaptation of Dashiell Hammett's 1930 novel, following the 1931 version directed by Roy Del Ruth, and the 1936 William Dieterle–directed Satan Met a Lady.

The 1941 film stars Humphrey Bogart as the hard-boiled private detective Sam Spade, in a role that would cement his status as a Hollywood icon, alongside Mary Astor as the enigmatic and manipulative femme fatale Brigid O'Shaughnessy. Peter Lorre and Sydney Greenstreet portray the memorable villains whose shifting alliances and hidden motives drive much of the story's tension. Set in San Francisco, the plot revolves around the pursuit of a priceless, jewel-encrusted falcon statuette, with each character willing to resort to deceit, betrayal, and even murder to claim it.

Premiering in New York City on October 3, 1941, the film was an immediate commercial and critical success. It remains widely considered a landmark of the film noir genre, and it is one of the greatest and most influential films of all time. It is frequently cited for its significant contributions to storytelling, character archetypes, and visual style in film noir. In 1989, the film was among the first 25 films selected by the Library of Congress for preservation in the National Film Registry, recognized as "culturally, historically, or aesthetically significant".

== Plot ==
"In 1539, the Knight Templars [sic] of Malta, paid tribute to Charles V of Spain, by sending him a Golden Falcon encrusted from beak to claw with rarest jewels----- but pirates seized the galley carrying this priceless token and the fate of the Maltese Falcon remains a mystery to this day---"

—
—Introductory text appearing after the film's opening credits

In San Francisco, private investigators Sam Spade and Miles Archer meet prospective client Ruth Wonderly. She claims to be looking for her missing sister, who ran off from their home in New York and came to the city with a man named Floyd Thursby. Archer agrees to help get her sister back. However, later that night, the police inform Spade that Archer has been killed. Spade tries calling his client at her hotel to discover she has checked out. Back at his apartment, he is grilled by police detective Tom Polhaus and Lieutenant Dundy, who tell him that Thursby was murdered the same evening. Dundy suggests that Spade had the opportunity and motive to kill Thursby, who likely killed Archer.

Later that morning, Spade meets Wonderly, now calling herself Brigid O'Shaughnessy. She confesses that her story was made up. She persuades Spade to investigate the murders and also reveals that Thursby was her partner. She suspects he took advantage of her and killed Archer but claims to have no idea who killed Thursby. At his office, Spade meets Joel Cairo, who offers him $5,000 to find a "black figure of a bird". When Spade is skeptical, Cairo pulls a gun on him and says he will search the room for it. Spade knocks Cairo out and goes through his belongings. When Cairo regains consciousness, he once again points his gun at Spade and says he'll search the room, to Spade's amusement.

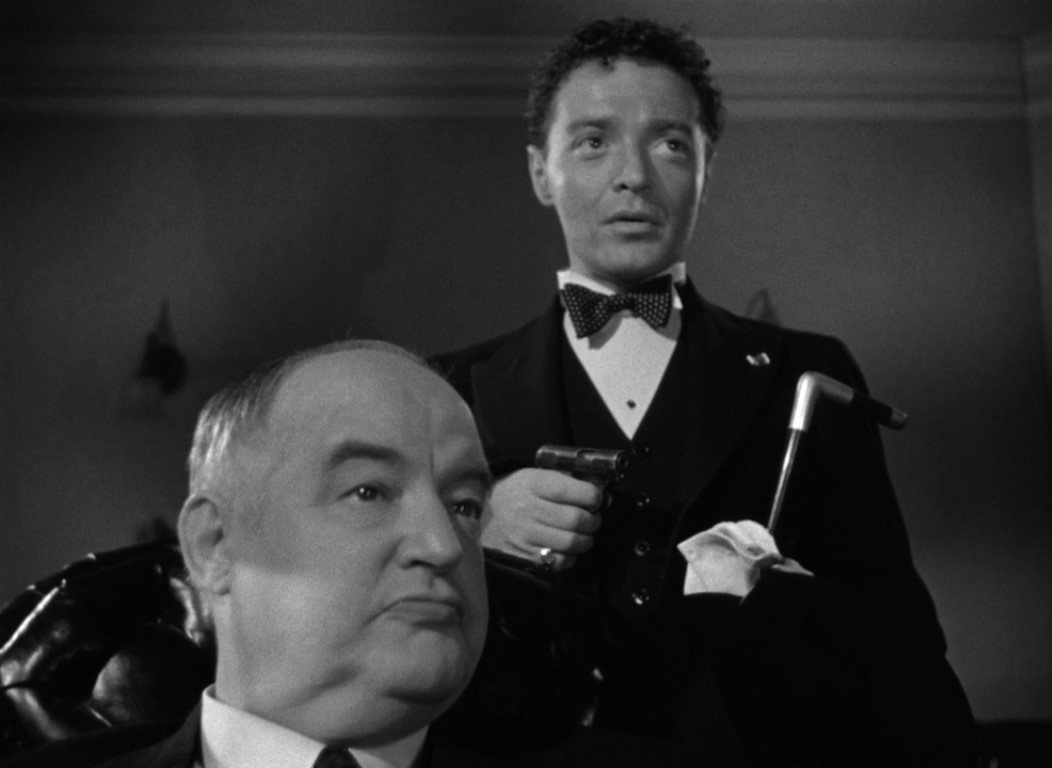
Gutman and Cairo meet with Spade.

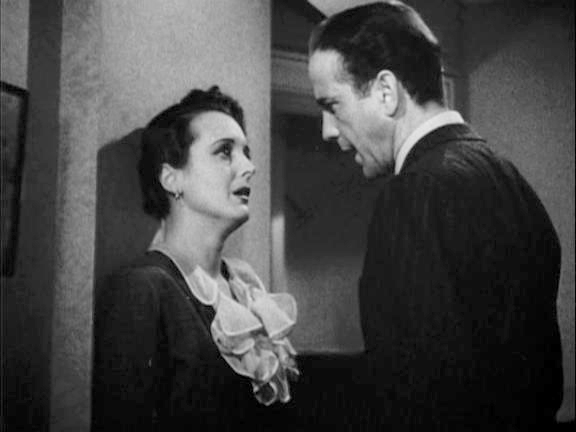
Spade confronts O'Shaughnessy.

On his way to visit O'Shaughnessy later that evening, Spade is followed by a young man but manages to evade him. When he tells O'Shaughnessy about Cairo, her nervousness indicates she knows him. He arranges a meeting between the two at his apartment, where Cairo becomes agitated when O'Shaughnessy reveals that the "Fat Man" is in San Francisco. When Spade goes to Cairo's hotel in the morning, he spots Wilmer Cook, the young man who trailed him earlier. Wilmer works for Kasper Gutman, the "Fat Man". In his hotel suite, Gutman relates the history of the Maltese Falcon, then offers Spade his pick of either $25,000 for the statuette and another $25,000 after its sale, or a quarter of the proceeds from its sale.

Spade's drink is spiked, and he passes out. Wilmer and Cairo come in from another room and leave with Gutman. When Spade regains consciousness, he searches the suite and finds a newspaper with the arrival time of the freighter La Paloma circled. He goes to the dock, only to find the ship on fire. Later, the ship's Captain Jacoby, who had been shot several times, staggers into Spade's office before dying. The bundle he was clutching contains the Maltese Falcon. O'Shaughnessy calls the office, gives an address, then screams before the line goes dead.

Spade stashes the package at the bus terminal, then goes to the address he was given, which turns out to be an empty lot. He returns home to discover O'Shaughnessy hiding in a doorway. He takes her inside and finds Gutman, Cairo, and Wilmer waiting for him, guns drawn. Gutman gives Spade $10,000 for the Falcon, but Spade tells them that part of his price is someone he can turn over to the police for the murders of Thursby and Captain Jacoby, suggesting Wilmer. After some intense negotiation, Gutman and Cairo agree and Wilmer is knocked out and disarmed.

Just after dawn, Spade calls his secretary, Effie Perine, to bring him the bundle. However, when Gutman inspects the statuette, he finds it is a fake, a copy made by the man from whom they stole it. Cairo lashes out at Gutman, and Wilmer escapes during the tumult. Recovering his composure, Gutman invites Cairo to return with him to Istanbul to continue their quest. After they leave, Spade calls the police and tells them where to pick up the pair, as well as Wilmer, who killed Thursby and Jacoby. Spade then angrily confronts O'Shaughnessy, telling her he knows she killed Archer to implicate Thursby, her unwanted accomplice. She confesses, but begs Spade not to turn her over to the police. Despite his feelings for her, Spade gives O'Shaughnessy up. He submits the statuette as evidence, describing it as "the stuff that dreams are made of".

== Cast ==
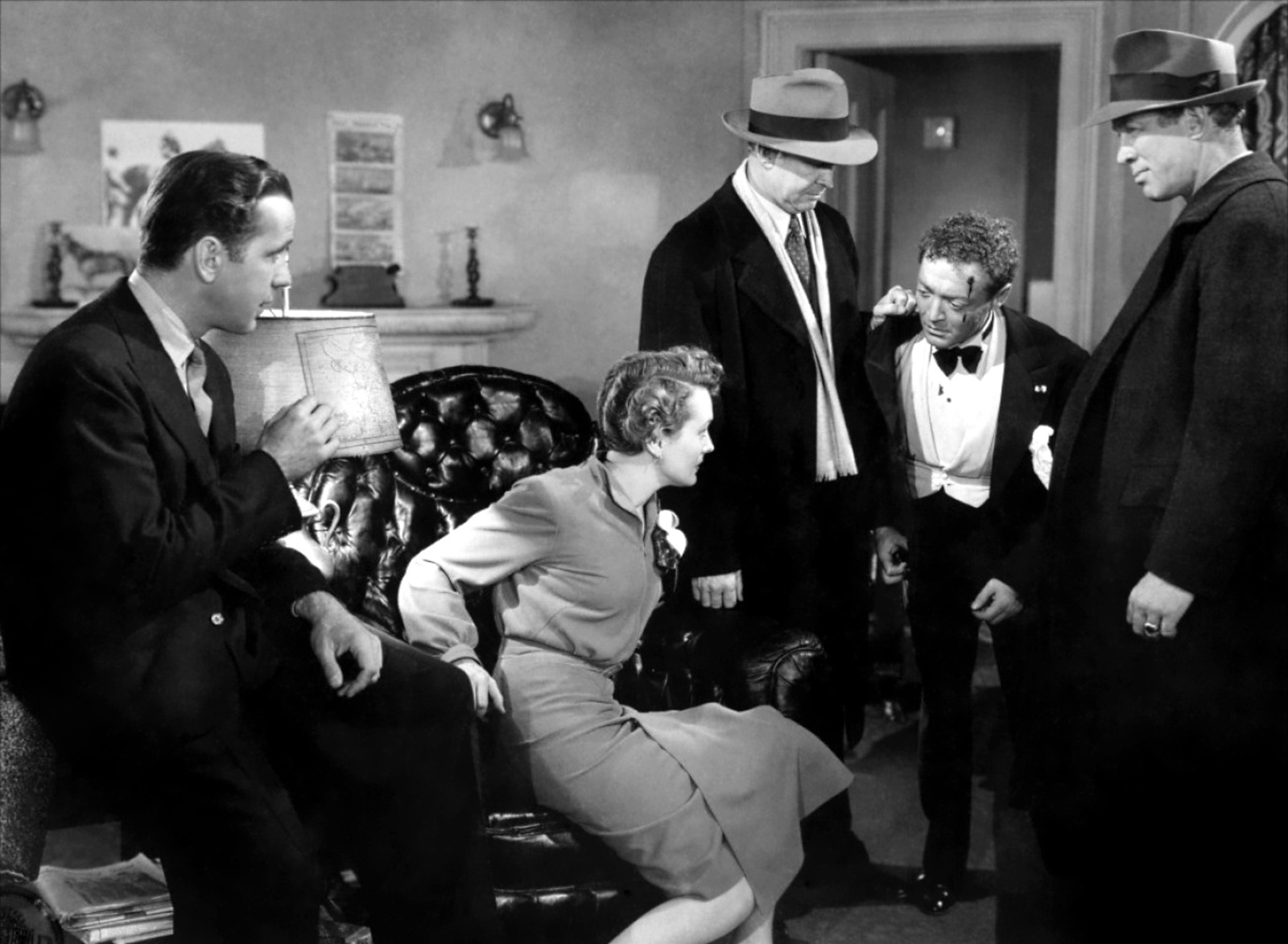
A promotional still showing O'Shaughnessy and Cairo clashing in front of the police

- Humphrey Bogart as Sam Spade
- Mary Astor as Ruth Wonderly/Brigid O'Shaughnessy
- Gladys George as Iva Archer
- Peter Lorre as Joel Cairo
- Barton MacLane as Lieutenant Dundy
- Lee Patrick as Effie Perine
- Sydney Greenstreet as Kasper Gutman
- Ward Bond as Detective Tom Polhaus
- Jerome Cowan as Miles Archer
- Elisha Cook Jr. as Wilmer Cook
- James Burke as Luke, hotel detective
- Murray Alper as Frank Richman, taxi driver
- John Hamilton as District Attorney Bryan

== Production ==
The film's trailer

=== Background ===
Dashiell Hammett had once worked as a private detective for the Pinkerton Detective Agency in San Francisco, and he used his birth name "Samuel" for the story's protagonist Sam Spade. He wrote of the book's main character in 1934:

Spade has no original. He is a dream man in the sense that he is what most of the private detectives I worked with would like to have been, and, in their cockier moments, thought they approached.

Other characters in The Maltese Falcon were based on people whom Hammett met or worked with during that time. The character of sinister "Fat Man" Kasper Gutman was based on Maundy Gregory, an overweight British detective-entrepreneur who was involved in many sophisticated endeavors and capers, including a search for a long-lost treasure like the jeweled Falcon. The character of Joel Cairo was based on a criminal whom Hammett arrested for forgery in Pasco, Washington, in 1920.

The novel was serialized in five parts in the pulp magazine Black Mask during 1929 and 1930 before being published in book form in 1930 by Alfred A. Knopf. Warner Bros. Pictures quickly bought the film rights of the novel, and made an adaptation the following year starring Ricardo Cortez and Bebe Daniels. The film closely followed the novel, including its references to homosexuality and a scene of Spade strip-searching Ruth Wonderly for a missing $1,000 bill. These topics made the film unscreenable a few years later under the Motion Picture Production Code, whose overseers refused to grant the studio a certificate when the studio tried to re-release it in 1935. The studio remade the story as the more Code-friendly Satan Met a Lady starring Bette Davis and Warren William. The film changed much of the novel's elements and became a comedy. However, it was panned by critics and audiences alike, including Davis, who referred to it as "junk".

=== Pre-production ===
During his preparation for The Maltese Falcon, his directorial debut, John Huston planned each second of the film to the last detail, tailoring the screenplay with instructions to himself for a shot-for-shot setup, with sketches for every scene, so filming could proceed fluently and professionally. Huston was adamant the film be methodically planned, thus ensuring the production maintained a tight schedule within their budget. It was shot quickly and completed for less than $400,000.

Such was the extent and efficacy of Huston's preparation of the script that almost no line of dialogue was eliminated in the final edit. Except for some exterior night shots, Huston shot the entire film in sequence, which greatly helped his actors. Much of the dialogue from the original novel was retained. The only major section of the novel missing in the film is the story of a man named Flitcraft, which Spade tells to Brigid O'Shaughnessy while waiting in his apartment for Cairo to arrive.

Huston removed all references to sex that the Hays Office had deemed to be unacceptable. He was also warned not to show excessive drinking. The director fought the latter, on the grounds that Spade was a man who put away a half bottle of hard liquor a day and showing him completely abstaining from alcohol would mean seriously falsifying his character.

=== Casting ===
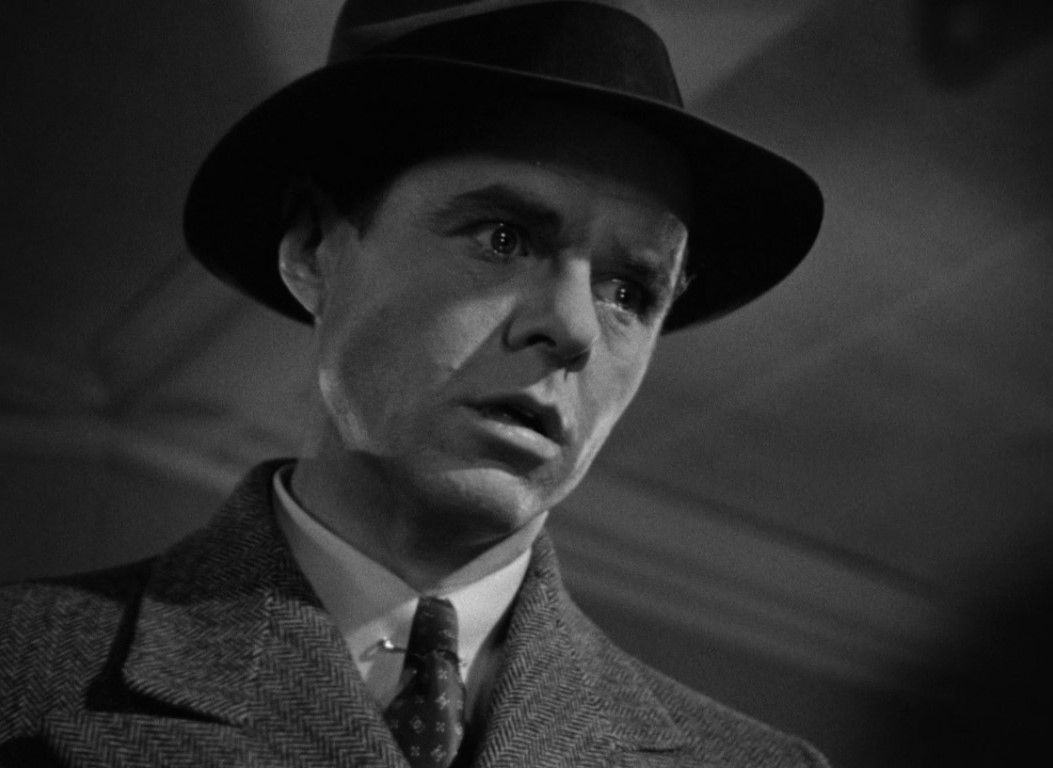
Wilmer, the "gunsel"

Humphrey Bogart was not the first choice to play Sam Spade; the role was originally offered to George Raft. Raft rejected the role because he did not want to work with an inexperienced director, and had a stipulation in his contract from making remakes. Huston was grateful that Bogart had quickly accepted the role and the film helped consolidate their lifelong friendship and set the stage for collaboration on other films. Bogart's convincing interpretation became the archetype for a private detective in the film noir genre, providing him acclaim and solidifying his onscreen persona. Ingrid Bergman watched Maltese Falcon over and over again while preparing for Casablanca in order to learn how to interact and act with Bogart.

Bergman, Joan Bennett, Geraldine Fitzgerald, Paulette Goddard, Rosalind Russell, Ginger Rogers, Janet Gaynor, Olivia de Havilland and Loretta Young were all considered for the role of Brigid. Fitzgerald was offered the part, but she turned it down. Eve Arden was considered for the role of Effie Perine. Lee Patrick was initially considered for the role of Iva Archer, but she later received the part of Effie. Having difficulty casting Kasper Gutman, Huston screen-tested stage actor Sydney Greenstreet on the suggestion of producer Hal Wallis. Greenstreet, who was 61 and weighed between 280 and 350 pounds, had not appeared on film before. However, he managed to impress Huston with his sheer size, distinctive abrasive laugh, bulbous eyes, and manner of speaking.

=== Filming ===
Principal photography took place on the Warner Bros. backlot from June 9 to July 18, 1941, with some reshoots on August 8. Following a preview screening on September 5, studio head Jack L. Warner ordered reshoots to simplify the opening scene. These reshoots took place on September 10 with Ernest Haller as cinematographer, since original cinematographer Arthur Edeson was unavailable.

=== Cinematography ===
Director of photography Edeson, who had a background that included Universal's monster films, used low-key lighting and arresting angles to emphasize the nature of the characters and their actions, such as the scene where Gutman explains the history of the Falcon to Spade, drawing out his story so that the knockout drops in Spade's drink will take effect. Roger Ebert describes this scene as "an astonishing unbroken seven-minute take", and script supervisor Meta Wilde remarked of this scene:

It was an incredible camera setup. We rehearsed two days. The camera followed Greenstreet and Bogart from one room into another, then down a long hallway and finally into a living room; there the camera moved up and down in what is referred to as a boom-up and boom-down shot, then panned from left to right and back to Bogart's drunken face; the next pan shot was to Greenstreet's massive stomach from Bogart's point of view. ... One miss and we had to begin all over again.

=== Props ===
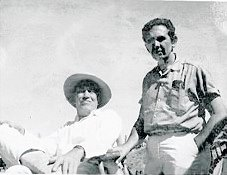
Fred Sexton (right) and The Maltese Falcon director John Huston, c. 1960

Fred Sexton, an American artist, sculpted the Maltese Falcon statuette prop for the film. It is modeled after a hawk perched on a rock and is encrusted with red garnets, amethysts, emeralds, and sapphires. As of 2004 it is owned by the Cavendish family and is part of the collection at Chatsworth House.

Several 11.5-inch (29 cm) tall falcon props were made for the film. One of the falcons was given to actor William Conrad by studio chief Jack L. Warner; it was auctioned in December 1994 for $398,500, the highest price paid for a film prop at that time. A 45-pound metal prop that appeared in the film was sold at auction on November 25, 2013, for over $4 million.

== Reception ==
=== Critical ===
A model of the Maltese Falcon

Following a preview in September 1941, Variety called it "one of the best examples of actionful and suspenseful melodramatic story telling in cinematic form":

Unfolding a most intriguing and entertaining murder mystery, picture displays outstanding excellence in writing, direction, acting and editing—combining in overall as a prize package of entertainment for widest audience appeal. Due for hefty grosses in all runs, it's textured with ingredients presaging numerous holdovers in the keys—and strong word-of-mouth will make the b.o. wickets spin.

Upon its release, Bosley Crowther described it as "the best mystery thriller of the year", saying "young Mr. Huston gives promise of becoming one of the smartest directors in the field ... "[T]he trick which Mr. Huston has pulled is a combination of American ruggedness with the suavity of the English crime school—a blend of mind and muscle—plus a slight touch of pathos." The widely read trade paper The Film Daily agreed with Crowther's assessment of the film and focused special attention as well on Huston's directorial debut. In its 1941 review of the "beautifully made" production, the paper asserted: "John Huston's direction of his own screenplay is as brilliant as any of the jewels which are alleged to encrust the falcon whose possession is the crux of the story." In 1950, in Life magazine, James Agee wrote about John Huston: "The first movie he directed, The Maltese Falcon, is the best private-eye melodrama ever made."

Pauline Kael lauded the film:

Humphrey Bogart's most exciting role was Sam Spade, that ambiguous mixture of avarice and honor, sexuality and fear, who gave new dimension to the detective genre. ... Huston used Hammett's plot design and economic dialogue in a hard, precise directorial style that brings out the full viciousness of characters so ruthless and greedy that they become comic. It is (and this is rare in American films) a work of entertainment that is yet so skillfully constructed that after many viewings it has the same brittle explosiveness—and even some of the same surprise—that it had in its first run.

In Allied-occupied Germany after World War II, the Information Control Division quickly withdrew The Maltese Falcon from German theaters because it seemed to depict American police as inept and glorify gangsters.

As a measure of modern or more current reactions to the film, the review-aggregation website Rotten Tomatoes reports The Maltese Falcon holds an approval rating of 99% based on 111 reviews, with an average rating of 9.20/10. The site's critics consensus reads: "Suspenseful, labyrinthine, and brilliantly cast, The Maltese Falcon is one of the most influential noirs—as well as a showcase for Humphrey Bogart at his finest." On Metacritic, the film has a weighted average score of 97 out of 100, based on 16 critics, indicating "universal acclaim". It is a part of Roger Ebert's series The Great Movies and was cited by Panorama du Film Noir Américain as the first major film noir. Eddie Muller listed it as one of his top 25 noir films.

=== Box office ===
According to Warner Bros.' records the film earned $967,000 domestically and $805,000 foreign.

== Awards and honors ==
For the 14th Academy Awards, the film was nominated for Best Picture, Greenstreet was nominated for Best Supporting Actor, and Huston for Best Adapted Screenplay.

It was one of the first 25 films selected by the Library of Congress for inclusion in the National Film Registry as "culturally, historically, or aesthetically significant". In 2006, Writers Guild of America West ranked its screenplay 47th in WGA's list of 101 Greatest Screenplays.

The American Film Institute included it and a quote in the following lists:

- 1998 – AFI's 100 Years...100 Movies – No. 23
- 2001 – AFI's 100 Years...100 Thrills – No. 26
- 2005 – AFI's 100 Years...100 Movie Quotes:
  - "The stuff that dreams are made of." – No. 14. The expression is based on Act 4 of William Shakespeare's play The Tempest, wherein Prospero says, "We are such stuff / As dreams are made on".
- 2007 – AFI's 100 Years...100 Movies (10th Anniversary Edition) – No. 31
- 2008 – AFI's 10 Top 10 – No. 6 Mystery Film

== Proposed sequel and adaptations ==
In the wake of the film's success, Warner Bros. immediately put a sequel tentatively titled The Further Adventures of the Maltese Falcon into development. Huston was set to direct the sequel, with Jack Warner approaching Dashiel Hammett to write a screenplay. However, Huston and Bogart's high demand and the studio's inability to agree on a salary with Hammett caused the plans to be dropped.

The film was adapted for radio several times. The first was for the Silver Theater broadcast on the CBS radio network on February 1, 1942, with Bogart as star. Philip Morris Playhouse staged an adaptation August 14, 1942, with Edward Arnold starring. On February 8, 1943, Lux Radio Theatre presented a one-hour adaptation which featured Edward G. Robinson and Gail Patrick in the leading roles. CBS later created a 30-minute adaptation for The Screen Guild Theater with Bogart, Mary Astor, Greenstreet and Peter Lorre all reprising their roles. This radio segment was originally released on September 20, 1943, and was played again on July 3, 1946.

== See also ==
- John Huston filmography
- List of cult films
