= Lifestyle photography =

Lifestyle photography is a genre of photography that mainly aims to capture portraits of people in situations, real-life events, or milestones in an artistic manner. The primary goal is to tell stories about people's lives or to inspire people at different times. Thus, it covers multidisciplinary types of photography together.

Even though lifestyle photography is about telling a story and documenting the subject's natural environment, lighting and posing still plays a huge factor. Lifestyle photography is "posed" in an informal way such that the photographer gives some prompts and then documents the natural responses and candid moments that follow. Most lifestyle photographers prefer to position their subjects strategically in natural lighting for a “real-life” effect, but some often use external lighting as well in a manner that looks as if it is pre-existing in the environment.
