= Van Schalkwyk =

van Schalkwyk is an Afrikaans surname. Notable people with the surname include:

- Jaco van Schalkwyk (born 1979), South African rugby union player
- Marthinus van Schalkwyk (born 1959), South African politician
- Shadley van Schalkwyk (born 1988), South African cricketer
- Sharome van Schalkwyk, South African politician
- Theunis van Schalkwyk (1929–2005), South African boxer
