= Lorenzo D. Lewelling =

American politician

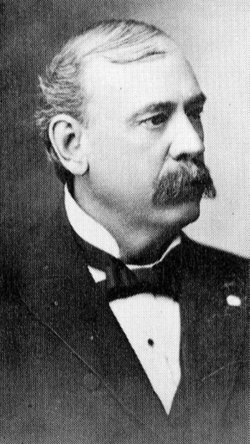

12th Governor of Kansas
- In office January 9, 1893 – January 14, 1895
- Lieutenant: Percy Daniels
- Preceded by: Lyman U. Humphrey
- Succeeded by: Edmund N. Morrill

Personal details
- Born: December 21, 1846 Salem, Iowa
- Died: September 3, 1900 (aged 53) Arkansas City, Kansas
- Party: Republican, Populist
- Spouse(s): Angeline M. Cook, Ida Bishop
- Profession: soldier, teacher

Lorenzo Dow Lewelling (December 21, 1846 – September 3, 1900) was the 12th governor of Kansas.

He was born in Salem, Iowa. He was the son of William Lewelling, an abolitionist and Quaker minister who died soon after making an impassioned speech in Indiana. After the accidental burning to death of his mother in 1856, he lived with his older sister and struggled to gain an education.

He attended Knox College (Illinois), the Eastman Business College and Whittier College (Iowa). He graduated from the Whittier College in 1867.

Lewelling worked at various jobs until the Civil War broke out in 1861. He enlisted in an Iowa regiment, but since he was underage, he was discharged. He was employed by a bridge-building corps in Chattanooga, Tennessee. Employed by the Freedman's Aid Society in 1865, he taught at a black school at Mexico, Missouri. Following the Civil War, Lewelling graduated from Whittier College in 1868 and became a teacher at the college in Salem, Iowa. He was known as an excellent lecturer and frequently gave public recitals of poetry.

Lewelling became a teacher in the Iowa State Reform School and on April 18, 1870, he married Angelina M. Cook, a teacher, of Red Oak, Indiana. In 1872 he was made superintendent of the girls' department of the state reform school in Iowa, and his wife was appointed matron. He founded and edited the "Des Moines Capital", an "anti-ring" Republican newspaper from 1880 to 1882. His wife died while matron, leaving three daughters. He then married Ida Bishop and they had one daughter, Ruth.

When Lewelling moved to Wichita, Kansas, he broke with the Republican party and was swept into office as a third-party candidate in the gubernatorial election of 1892. The Democrats endorsed his candidacy and he was elected. His wife, Ida remained in Wichita while he was in the capitol and his daughter, Jesse, acted as his official hostess.

Lewelling presided over a state that was largely in the control of the Populist Party. However, the state legislature was split, the Senate controlled by the Populists and the House by the Republicans. Lewelling attempted to recognize only the Populist members of the House. Despite both groups meeting in the same chamber at different times, conflict occurred and led to the "Legislative War", until the Kansas Supreme Court decided in favor of the Republicans.

Lewelling died in Arkansas City, Kansas, and is interred at Maple Grove Cemetery in Wichita.

The Governor L. D. Lewelling House in Wichita, where he lived, is listed on the National Register of Historic Places.

== See also ==
- Henderson Luelling and Seth Lewelling, paternal uncles
- Louise Jarecka, daughter

Party political offices
Preceded by John F. Willits	Populist nominee for Governor of Kansas; 1892, 1894	Succeeded by John W. Leedy
Political offices
Preceded by Lyman U. Humphrey	Governor of Kansas; 1893–1895	Succeeded by Edmund N. Morrill
