= Verna Cook Salomonsky =

American architect

- Born: Verna Cook; October 19, 1890; Spokane, Washington
- Died: September, 1978
- Other name: Verna Cook Shipway
- Education: École Spéciale d'Architecture and Columbia University
- Occupation: Architect
- Spouses: Edgar Salomonsky; Warren Butler Shipway

Verna Cook Salomonsky (1890–1978) was a pioneering early 20th-century American architect known for her work as a solo practitioner in residential communities outside of New York in the 1920s and 1930s and later as an author on architectural design and history. Following the death of her first husband, Edgar Salomonsky, in 1929, she maintained her own practice and designed several hundred homes, including a model home for the New York World's Fair in 1939. In the 1960s, she and her second husband, Warren Butler Shipway, wrote several books on Mexican domestic architecture and design.

== Education ==
Verna Cook was born in Spokane, Washington on October 19, 1890, to Harlan J. Cook, a local businessman, and Mara S. Taylor Cook. Cook attended Spokane High school, graduating in 1908, and then enrolled for a year at The Misses Gilman's School for Girls in Boston, Massachusetts. She subsequently traveled to Paris and enrolled at the École Spéciale d'Architecture for two years, returning to the United States in October 1911. After saving up enough money to continue schooling and the shutdown of École Spéciale d'Architecture due to World War I, she began two and a half years of coursework at Columbia University's School of Architecture from 1915 to 1918 instead.

== Career ==
In 1913, Cook began working as a junior drafter in the office of William Knighton in Salem, Oregon. After leaving Knighton's offices in 1915, she returned to New York City in 1916 to begin a three-year long position as a general drafter and designer in the office of Dwight James Baum. During this three-year period, she also worked for three months in 1917 for Howard Major and six months in 1918 for Electus D. Litchfield.

By 1920, Cook had married fellow Columbia graduate Edgar Salomonsky and the couple established their own firm, focusing largely on residential architecture. Their offices were located at 368 Lexington Avenue until 1921, when they moved to 331 Madison Avenue; in the late 1920s they were located at 40 East 49th Street and by 1936, they were located at 424 Madison Avenue. In the early 1920s, Cook used her knowledge of running a household as well as her architectural education to write for magazines such as The House Beautiful and House and Garden. She regularly wrote about the service entry, storage areas, linen and china closets, furnishing, and decorating.

During the late 1920s, Cook also created the designs for several lines of "boudoir accessories" including hand mirrors, combs, and hairbrushes. She also analyzed furniture alongside her husband around this time.

After Edgar's death in 1929, Verna continued to practice alone, completing hundreds of residences in the New York metropolitan area and later in California. Her work primarily relied on traditional vocabularies, including Georgian, Colonial and English style houses as well as eclectic combinations of various styles. In 1936, House and Garden selected her firm to design the magazine's first "Ideal House," which was exhibited as a model home in the "Town of Tomorrow" at the 1939 World's Fair in New York. By 1937, she was a registered architect in New York, Connecticut, and Pennsylvania and had served as a critic for one semester at the School of Design for Women in Philadelphia, PA and for three years at the New York School of Interior Decoration in New York City. Cook was also among the first female members of the Architectural League of New York; the League opened its membership to women in 1934, and in 1936, Cook was the only female architect admitted. She retired from practicing architecture in 1939 due to issues with her eyesight.

In 1939, Cook married her second husband, Warren Butler Shipway, a 1921 graduate of Princeton University with a degree in civil engineering. The couple moved to California in 1947, and travel to Mexico in the 1950s inspired five books on historic and contemporary Mexican residential architecture, cowritten by Cook and her husband.

Cook died in September of 1978 in La Jolla, California, where she moved to in 1972 following her husband's death, and her archives today reside at the University of California at San Diego.

== Built works ==
- House in Fieldston (1920), Riverdale, New York City, with Edgar Salomonsky
- House of M.F. Griffin (1928), Scarsdale, N.Y., with Edgar Salomonsky
- House of Raymond Faith (1928), Bryn Mawr Park, N.Y., with Edgar Salomonsky
- House of Edgar Salomonsky, Scarsdale, N.Y., with Edgar Salomonsky
- C.E. Wells House (1929), Woodland Park, Summit, New Jersey, with Edgar Salomonsky
- House of Alexander Crane (1933), Scarsdale, N.Y., with Edgar Salomonsky
- House of Clifford Walsh (1933), Scarsdale, N.Y.
- C. Ernest Greenwood House (1933), Scarsdale, N.Y.
- Tauton Road House (1934), Scarsdale, N.Y.
- Lockwood and Axtell Drive House (1934), Scarsdale, N.Y.
- House in Berkley, Scarsdale (1933)
- Marjorie Warren House (1933) North Castle, NY
- Dr. Herman Prange House (1934), Scarsdale, NY
- House of C.G. Novotny (1935), Scarsdale, NY
- Residence of A.W. Brown (1936), Scarsdale, NY
- Pugliese House (1938), Harrison, NY
- Dwight and Kate Wade House (1940), Sevierville, Tennessee. National Register of Historic Places (1997).

== Awards ==
- Third prize, Loeb Prize of the Society of Beaux Arts Architects, 1915.
- First Prize, "Brick House." Small House Competition, 1921.
- Second prize, Small House Competition sponsored by The House Beautiful, 1927.
- House and Garden magazine's first "Ideal House," 1936.

== Publications ==
- Salomonsky, Verna Cook. "The Year-Round Service Porch, Half Indoors, Half Out, a Constant Delight." (Illustrations by the Author.)The Washington Post, Apr 07, 1924.
- Salomonsky, Verna Cook and Edgar Salomonsky. An exemplar of antique furniture design : a collection of measured drawings of furniture in the Metropolitan Museum of Art accompanied with photographs and text. Grand Rapids: Periodical Publishing Company, 1923.
- Shipway, Verna Cook. Masterpieces of furniture, in photographs and measured drawings. New York: Dover Publications, 1953.
- Shipway, Verna Cook and Warren Shipway, The Mexican House, Old & New. New York: Architectural Book Publishing Company, 1960.
- Shipway, Verna Cook and Warren Shipway, Mexican interiors. New York: Architectural Book Publishing Company, 1962.
- Shipway, Verna Cook and Warren Shipway, Mexican homes of today. New York: Architectural Book Publishing Company, 1964.
- Shipway, Verna Cook and Warren Shipway, Decorative design in Mexican homes. New York: Architectural Book Publishing Company, 1966.
- Shipway, Verna Cook and Warren Shipway, Houses of Mexico; origins and traditions. New York: Architectural Book Publishing Company, 1970.
