= Timeline of Carmel-by-the-Sea, California =

The following is a timeline of the history of Carmel-by-the-Sea, California, United States.

Date	Event	Image	Ref(s)
1771	Mission San Carlos Borromeo de Carmelo (Carmel Mission) was moved from Monterey to Carmel on August 1. The first mass was celebrated on August 24, and Junípero Serra officially took up residence in the newly constructed buildings on December 24.		
1853	Known as "Rancho Las Manzanitas", the unoccupied area of wooden hills that became Carmel-by-the-Sea was purchased by French businessman Honoré Escolle in the ca. 1853. He bought the land for pasturage and firewood.		
1859	William Martin of Scotland arrived in Monterey in 1856 by ship with his family. His son, John Martin, bought land around the Carmel River in 1859 from broker Lafayette F. Loveland. He built the Martin Ranch on 216-acre (0.87 km^{2}) that extended from the homes along Carmel Point to the Carmel River. The ranch became known as the Mission Ranch because it was so close to the Carmel Mission.		
1870	The United States government patent gave the Carmel Mission Church 7-acre (0.028 km^{2}) of land.		
1880	The branch line of the Southern Pacific Railroad between Castroville and Monterey, California was completed. It was called the Del Monte Express. Charles Crocker chose Monterey as the site for a new seaside luxury hotel, which would be called the Hotel Del Monte. It was thought that the Southern Pacific would extend tracks and service to Carmel.		
1884	Work began on the repair of the Carmel Mission Church. Leland Stanford led the fund-raising effort that involved more than 50 citizens of California.		
1888	Escolle and Santiago J. Duckworth, a young developer from Monterey with dreams of establishing a Catholic retreat near the Carmel Mission, signed an agreement to sell 324 acres (131 ha) to Duckworth and his brother on February 18, 1888. The land began at the top of the Carmel Hill and ran past the boundary of the Hatton Ranch, down through Ocean Avenue to Junipero Avenue. On May 1, 1888, they filed a subdivision map with the County Recorder of Monterey County.		
1889	Abbie Jane Hunter, a realtor from San Francisco, bought seven Carmel City lots. She became a real estate associate with Duckworth, to help build a Catholic summer resort called Carmel City.		
1889	To attract visitors to Carmel City, Carpenter Delos Goldsmith (1828–1923), an uncle to Abbie Jane Hunter, built the Carmel bathhouse in 1889 above the seashore where Ocean Avenue terminated. Hunter's son, Wesley R. Hunter (1876–1966) helped build it. It was torn down in 1929.		
1889	The first Carmel Post Office opened in 1889.		
1890	Hotel Carmelo was one of the first buildings constructed along Ocean Avenue. In 1890, Carmel City trees were removed and an outline marked for the construction of Ocean Avenue heading east up the hill.		
1892	The Women's Real Estate Investment Company was established by Abbie Jane Hunter this year. She also used the name Carmel-by-the-Sea in advertisements for the first time then and she acquired 164-acre (0.66 km^{2}) of the Carmel City Tract.		
1902	The City was founded this year. San Francisco attorney Frank Hubbard Powers purchased all the unsold land in Carmel with real estate developer James Franklin Devendorf who became his partner in the Carmel Development Company they founded on November 25, establishinh the artists' and writers' colony that became Carmel-by-the-Sea, in 1903.		
1902/03	The Richardson Log Cabin was built in 1902 or 1903 by George H. Richardson, an Alameda attorney. The structure is recognized as one of the oldest residential buildings in Carmel and the earliest known residence of American poet Robinson Jeffers.		
1903	The Carmel Development Company Building was the first "modern" commercial building in Carmel built by Thomas Albert Work of Pacific Grove, California, in 1902–1903, on the northwest corner of San Carlos Street and Ocean Avenue.		
1903	Louis S. Slevin photographed Carmel in 1903, and was the first to open a general merchandise store in 1905. He was also the first postmaster and town treasurer.		
1905	The Carmel Arts and Crafts Club was founded in 1905, by Elsie Allen, a former art instructor for Wellesley College. The club was located at Monte Verde Street where the Golden Bough Playhouse is today. The clubhouse served as the Carmel community cultural center. Between 1919 and 1948 Carmel was the largest art colony on the Pacific coast.		
1905	Writers Mary Austin, Jack London, James Hooper, Arnold Genthe, and George Sterling came to Carmel. In 1905, Sterling bought property between 10th and 11th Avenues.		
1906	The Sunset School was Carmel's first public school founded in 1904, moving in 1906 to San Carlos Street. In 1907, there were only 30 children and one teacher.		
1908	Carmel fire department was established in 1908 by twenty citizens that was led by Robert George Leidig (1879–1970).		
1910	Dr. Daniel T. MacDougal of the Carnegie Institution established the Coastal Botanical Laboratory at the Outlands in the Eighty Acres, with some scientists moving to the Carmel area.		
1910	The Forest Theater Society was founded by Herbert Heron. The first theatrical production, David and Saul, a biblical drama by Constance Lindsay Skinner under the direction of Garnet Holme of Berkeley, inaugurated the Forest Theater on July 9, 1910		
1913	Carmel City Hall was established in July 1913 as the All Saints Episcopal Church located on Monte Verde Street and 7th Avenue.		
1914	From July through September 1914, painter William Merritt Chase taught his last summer class, his largest with over one hundred pupils, at the Carmel Arts and Crafts Club's Summer School Of Art.		
1915	The Carmel Pine Cone was founded in 1915 by William Overstreet who proclaimed in the first four-page edition of 300 copies, "we are here to stay!"		
1916	City was incorporated on October 31, 1916. Alfred P. Frazer became first Mayor of Carmel.		
1916	August Englund served as Carmel's first police chief and one-man police department, dedicated to ensuring the safety and security of Carmel for nearly 20 years.		
1920	In 1920, Carmel-by-the-Sea had a total population of 638.		
1921	The Abalone League baseball and softball league was established, the first such league in the western United States. It was a Carmel focal point for many years.		
1922	A city planning commission was established to protect Carmel from over commercialization. Perry Newberry, concerned about Carmel's growth, entered city politics.		
1922	Carmel Woods was laid out in 1922 by developer Samuel F. B. Morse (1885–1969). It included a 25-acre (0.10 km^{2}) subdivision with 119 building lots. Carmel Woods was one of three major land developments adjacent to the Carmel city limits between 1922 and 1925. The other two were the Hatton Fields, a 233 acres (94 ha) between the eastern town limit and Highway 1, and the Walker Tract to the south, which was 216 acres (87 ha) of the Martin Ranch called The Point.		
1923	The Bank of Carmel opened on July 15, 1923, in a building between Mission and Dolores Streets in Carmel-by-the-Sea.		
1925	Paul Aiken Flanders founded the Carmel Land Company to help develop Hatton Fields. He purchased 233.15 acres (94.35 ha) of property from the Hatton estate for $100,000 (equivalent to $1,792,979 in 2024).		
1927	A small group of artists founded the Carmel Art Association was founded on August 8 of this year and by 1933 it had moved permanently to Ira Mallory Remsen's Dolores Street studio.		
1928	Construction of the Harrison Memorial Library was finished.		
1928	The Kocher Building was built, the first of three commercial structures designed by Blaine & Olsen of Oakland, in the Spanish Eclectic Revival style. It was followed by El Paseo Building (1928) and La Ribera Hotel (1929).		
1929	The Grace Deere Velie Metabolic Clinic, funded by Grace Deere Velie Harris, opens on the outskirts of Carmel. Specializing in "metabolic disorders" it was converted to a general hospital in 1934 and becomes the Community Hospital of the Monterey Peninsula.		
1929	Perry Newberry became the city trustee on the platform "Keep Carmel Off the Map!"		
1929	In early 1929 photographer Edward Weston came to Carmel and moved to Johan Hagemeyer's cottage in Carmel, at Mountain View and Ocean Avenues.		
1932	Doud Building was built as a mixed-use retail shop and residence, located on the SW corner of Ocean Avenue and Mission Street.		
1937	Carmel Fire Station was opened in June 1937, located on 6th Avenue, between San Carolos and Mission Streets.		
1986	Actor Clint Eastwood, Republican is elected Mayor of Carmel from 1986 to 1988.		
1989	By 1989, the Harrison Memorial Library expanded to the a second Park Brank Library located at Mission Street and 6th Avenue. The Henry Meade Williams Local History Room, in honor of Henry Meade Williams, preserves collections of manuscripts, personal papers, photographs, and books relating to Carmel's history.		
2020	As of the 2020 census, the town had a total population of 3,220, down from 3,722 at the 2010 census.		

== See also ==
- History of Carmel-by-the-Sea
- List of Historic Buildings in Carmel-by-the-Sea
