= List of historic buildings in Carmel-by-the-Sea =

There are two sections listed below: List of Downtown Historic District Buildings in Carmel-by-the-Sea, California, United States, based on the Downtown Conservation District Historic Property Survey, and Other Historic Buildings in Carmel.

DPR stands for Department of Parks and Recreation.

== Table key ==
Listed as a California Historical Landmark

== Downtown Historic District Buildings in Carmel-by-the-Sea ==
Building name	Image	Block	Architect/builder	Style	Year constructed	Date submitted/Notes
Harrison Memorial Library		72	Bernard Maybeck	Spanish Eclectic	1927	November 18, 2002
Percy Parkes Building		76	Percy Parkes	Spanish Colonial Revival	1926	Commercial downtown building submitted to the California Register on April 25, 2002.
Oakes Building		75	Thomas W. Morgan	Spanish Revival	1922	Commercial downtown building submitted to the California Register on November 5, 2002.
Normandy Inn		Ocean Avenue, between Monte Verde St. and Casanova St.	Robert A. Stanton	French architecture	1925	Architect Robert A. Stanton and Fred Ruhl built his office in downtown Carmel on Monte Verde Street and Ocean Avenue. This building became the Normandy Inn.
La Ribera Hotel		75	Blaine & Olsen	Spanish Eclectic	1929	February 13, 2003

== Other Historic Buildings in Carmel ==
Building name	Image	Street	Designer/architect	Style	Year constructed	Date listed/Notes
Stonehouse		Eighth Avenue and Monte Verde Street	Ben Turner	American Craftsman	1906	Stonehouse is a historic American Craftsman-style house built in 1906. In 1923, syndicated cartoonist Gene Byrnes acquired the home, which was converted into an inn in 1946.
Leroy Babcock House		Camino Real Street and Twelfth Avenue	Leroy Babcock	American Craftsman	1918	Leroy Babcock House is an American Craftsman-style house built by Leroy Babcock circa 1918 as his own residence.
American Legion Post No. 512		Dolores Street and 8th Avenue	Guy O. Koepp		1928	Historic meeting hall at Dolores and 8th street in Carmel-by-the-Sea, California. The Post 512 clubhouse and its facilities are open to all legionnaires. The Alvin B. Chapin Memorial Hall is used for special events and civic functions. The building was registered with the California Register of Historical Resources on January 28, 2002.
Carmel bathhouse		Ocean Avenue at the Carmel beach	Delos Goldsmith		1889	Abbie Jane Hunter and Delos Goldsmith built the first community beach and bath house, on a dune, at the end of Ocean Avenue at the Carmel beach, with the help of her son, Wesley Hunter.
Ann Nash-Dorothy Bassett House		SW Junipero Street and Malta Avenue	Nash	Craftsman	1921	The Ann Nash-Dorothy Bassett House was built by Ann Nash and Dorothy Bassett in 1921.
Ross E. Bonham House		SW corner of San Carlos Street and 12 Avenue	Georege Whitcomb	Tudor-style	1926	The Ross E. Bonham Tudor-style house was designed by George Whitcomb for Ross E. Bonham.
Eric Berne House		Carpenter Street	Bromfield	Victorian	1888	Eric Berne lived in a four-bedroom, three bath Victorian house on the eastern side of Carpenter Street, in the second house located south from 2nd Avenue. The house dates back to 1888, originally built for surveyor Davenport Bromfield while he mapped the streets of Carmel City. It is one of the oldest structures in town.
Carmel Mission		3080 Rio Road	Franciscan missionaries	Spanish Colonial architecture	1770	October 15, 1966 (#66000214)
Carmel Art Association		Dolores Street between 5th & 6th Ave.	Clay Otto		1927	
Mrs. J.S. Cone House (Bark House)		Northwest corner of Monte Verde Street and 13th Avenue	Lee Gottfried	Rustic bungalow	1922	The Mrs. J.S. Cone House (Bark House) in on northwest corner of Monte Verde Street and 13th Avenue.
Jack Calvin Cottage		West Mission Street 6 S. Vista and 1st Avenues	Jack Calvin		1920s	The Jack Calvin Cottage was built by Jack Calvin who was a scholar, writer, and friend of John Steinbeck, Francis Whitaker, Ed Ricketts, and other Bohemians. In 1930, Ricketts met Steinbeck at a party in Jack Calvin's house in Carmel on the west side of Mission Street. Marion Karr was the second owner.
Zanetta Catlett Cottage		West side of Dolores and 3rd Avenue	Hazel Waltrous	Storybook-style	1924	In 1925, actor and comedian Walter Catlett was residing in New York City, where Walter was an actor and Zanetta kept house. By 1930, Walter and Zanetta had separated, and Zanetta was residing at their Storybook-style house in Carmel with her 15-year-old son, Richard "Dick."
Violet Campbell House or Alice MacGowan House on 2E of Lincoln s/side 13th Ave. (1927)		South side of 13th Avenue and east of Lincoln Street	Samuel J. Miller; Lee Gottfried; Charles Summer Green	Vernacular	1927	The residence was created from a 1916 buggy shed. The interior Great Room was designed in 1926 by Charles Summer Green and built by Samuel J. Miller and Lee Gottfried.
Grace MacGowan Cooke House		13th Avenue and San Antonio Avenue	Eugenia Maybury	Tudor-style	1908	In 1908, the sisters Alice MacGowan and Grace MacGowan Cooke moved into a large, Tudor-style two-story house on 13th Avenue, the second house northeast of San Antonio Avenue, built in 1905 by architect Eugenia Maybury, one of Carmel's first female architects.
Santiago Duckworth House		Carpenter Street southwest of 2nd Avenue	Delos Goldsmith	Vernacular	1888	In 1888, Carpenter Delos Goldsmith built Duckworth a one-story Vernacular-style side-gabled redwood residence, now known as the Santiago Duckworth House. The house is located on Carpenter Street southwest of 2nd Avenue. It was one of the first homes constructed in Carmel City.
Carl Cherry Center for the Arts		Northwest corner of 4th Avenue and Guadalupe Street	Delos Goldsmith	Queen Anne style	1894	The Augusta Robertson House is a historic one-and-one-half story wood-framed Queen Anne style residence, located on the northwest corner of 4th Avenue and Guadalupe Street in Carmel-by-the-Sea. It is now the Carl Cherry Center for the Arts.
Door House		24814 Pescadcro Road	John Columbus Stevenson	Vernacular	1906	House made of four-paneled solid-wood Victorian doors with a cedar-shignled hip roof. It was saved from demolition by the Carmel Preservation Foundation and designated historical on June 28, 1995.
Donald Hale House		S. Dolores and 2nd Avenue	Lee Gottfried	Arts and Crafts style	1923	The Donald Hale House on S. Dolores and 2nd Avenue, was built by Lee Gottfried in 1923.
First Murphy House		Lincoln Street and Sixth Avenue	Michael J. Murphy	American Craftsman	1902	July 1, 2002
Alfred P. Fraser House		Northwest corner of Camino Real and Ocean Avenue	Unknown	Craftsman	1913	The Craftsman-style house was the home of Carmel's first mayor, Alfred P. Fraser, who served from 1916 to 1920.
Forge in the Forest		24814 Pescadcro Road			1926	The lot of Forge in the Forest was purchased in November 1923 by Edna M. Sheridan from the Del Monte Properties Co. for $10. John C. Catlin had a small forge in the garage of his home (not the restaurant on Junipero Street & 5th Ave). Fred Neslson and Karyl Hall bought the house in 1990. They added an addition to the house.
Amelia L. Gates Cottage		3 Camino Real and 8th Avenue		Vernacular	1922	The Dr. Amelia Gates retired in Carmel in 1922. She replaced an early cabin on Camino Real with a one-story vernacular style cottage of her own design, now called the Dr. Amelia Gates Cottage. Her cottage is a historic building located at 3 Camino Real in Carmel-by-the-Sea, California. The cottage was built in 1922 and was originally owned by Dr. Amelia Gates, who was one of the first female physicians in California.
Arnold Genthe House and Studio		Camino Real and 11th Avenue	Arnold Genthe	Craftsman	1906	Arnold Genthe designed the plans for his large Craftsman-style cottage at Camino Real between 10th and 11th Avenues.
Charles Sumner Greene Studio		Lincoln Street south of 13th Avenue	Charles Greene	American Craftsman	1923	Charles Sumner Greene built a Craftsman style home and studio from used brick he acquired from El Carmelo hotel in Pacific Grove. The exterior walls of the studio are set in Flemish cross bond with stylized interior carvings.
Golden Bough Theater		Monte Verde Street	James Pruitt	Theater	1951	
Hansel Cottage		Torres Street and 6th Ave.	Hugh W. Comstock	Storybook architecture	1924	Hugh W. Comstock and his wife designed and built, a 244 ft (74 m) "Fairy Tale" style cottage called "Hansel" on Torres Street near sixth Avenue in 1924.
Johan Hagemeyer House		NW of Torres St. and Mountain View Ave.	Hazel Watrous (designer), George Whitcomb (builder)	English Cottage	1923	The Johan Hagemeyer studio and home, was George Whitcomb's first project, now the Forest Lodge on Mountain View Avenue.
Abbie Jane Hunter House		Northeast corner of 4th Avenue and Guadalupe Street	Delos Goldsmith	Queen Anne style	1894	The Abbie Jane Hunter House is a historic one-and-one-half story wood-framed Queen Anne style residence, located on the northeast corner of 4th Avenue and Guadalupe Street in Carmel-by-the-Sea.
Bliss-Hubbell House		Dolores Street NE of 12 Avenue	Georege Whitcomb and Miles Bain	Vernacular	1928	In 1928, George Whitcomb and Miles Bain designed and constructed the Bliss-Hubbell House on Dolores Street as a vernacular house for two retired schoolteachers. The house features a granite stone veneer.
Hasenyager House (Eliza Palache House)		2 SW of 13th Avenue on west side of Carmelo Street	M.J. Murphy	French Eclectic-style	1931	M.J. Murphy built this two-story French Eclectic-style house in 1931. It was constructed for Eliza Palache and was restored in 1987, by the current owners Edward and Frances Hasenyager. The house was recorded by Kent L. Seavey on November 21, 2001 for inclusion with the Carmel Inventory of Historic Resources.
Hildreth Hare Cottage		E. Dolores and 4th Ave.	Hazel Watrous		1926	The Hildreth Hare Cottage designed by Hazel Watrous and built in 1926 for Hildreth Masten Hare. She was active in the Forest Theater and the Golden Bough. The cottage is located on E. Dolores and 4th Avenue.
Leetes Island West		Santa Fe Street and 8th Avenue	Percy Parkes		1930	Early Carmel cottage built in 1930 by Percy Parkes. Today it has a facade of redwood shingles and metal casement windows.
D. W. Johnson House		NE corner of Casanova Street and 7th Avenue	Michael J. Murphy	Colonial Revival	1903	The D.W. Johnson House is a Colonial Revival-style house with a gambrel roof NE corner of Casanova Street and 7th Avenue. It was remodeled by Michael J. Murphy in 1925 for Dewitt Wallace Johnson. He and his mother built the Hotel Carmel in 1895, and he was Carmel's first police and fire commissioner.
David Starr Jordan House		At the corner of Camino Real and 7th Avenue		(architecture)	1908	David Starr Jordan, the first president of Stanford University, built a house at the northeast corner of Camino Real and 7th Avenue. His house and Dr. Vernon Kellogg's house are two of the few remaining homes of Carmel's "Professor's Row."
Vernon Kellogg House		Camino Real 3 SE of 7th Avenue	Unknown	Craftsman	1906	Dr. Vernon Lyman Kellogg and his wife Charlotte built this wood-framed redwood Craftsman-style cottage in 1906. The outside walls have wood shingles. Kellogg was a professor of entomology at Stanford University from 1894 to 1920. This, and David Starr Jordan's home are two of the remaining on "Professor's Row."
Garfield D. Merner House		Carmelo 2 SW of 7th Avenue	Michael J. Murphy; Ernest Bixler	Tudor-style	1924	The Garfield D. Merner House or "Hob Nob," is a one-and-one-half-story Tudor Revival architecture-style residence built for $4,500 in 1924 for Garfield D. Merner. Built by Carmel's builder Ernest Bixler.
Mission Ranch		26270 Dolores Street	Juan Romero	Ranch-style house	1852	Mission Ranch is a historic hotel and restaurant in Carmel. The Mission Ranch once included 160-acre (0.65 km^{2}).
Jo Mora House		West San Carlos Street and 3rd S. of 1st	Jo Mora	Craftsman-style	1921	The Jo Mora family relocated to Carmel-by-the-Sea, California, the largest art colony on the West Coast, making it their primary residence. He constructed a Craftsman-style home, which is located on the west side of San Carlos Street, the third house south of 1st Avenue.
Murphy's Barn		N. San Antonio Avenue	Matthew M. Murphey	Vernacular architecture	1846	Murphy's Barn, also known as the Murphy Barn/Powers Studio, is a historic building that was built in 1846, by Matthew M. Murphey in Carmel-by-the-Sea. The structure is recognized as an important American period farm building and the oldest remaining artist's studio in Carmel.
McCloud House		2934 Santa Lucia Avenue	Carl Bensberg	Cape Cod style	1939	Carl Bensberg was the designer and builder of this two-story wood framed Cape Cod style cottage.
John Neikirk Cottage		Southwest San Carlos and corner of Vista	Hugh W. Comstock	Cotswold-style	1926	The John Neikirk Cottage was built by Hugh Comstock in 1926. Neikirk was a leader of the first Carmel Boy Scout Troop.
Perry Newberry Cottage		Vista Avenue, between Mission and Junipero Streets	Maynard McEntire (builder) Newberry (designer)	Craftsman-style	1937	Perry Newberry bought one of the first lots sold by Frank Devendorf and Frank Powers in 1910. The Perry Newberry Cottage, or "Sticks and Stones" Craftsman-style house was built in 1937 by builder Maynard McEntire. It can be found on the northern side of Vista Avenue, specifically the second house to the west of Junipero Avenue.
Rudolph Ohm House		Monte Verde Street and 5th Avenue	Ben Turner	Craftsman	1907	This residence positioned adjacent to Ben Turner's house, was specifically built for his daughter Emma and her husband Rudy Ohm. Turner himself oversaw the creation of the retaining walls and the brick chimney.
Outlands in the Eighty Acres		25800 Hatton Road	Henry Higby Gutterson	Tudor Revival architecture	1925	The Outlands in the Eighty Acres, also known as Flanders Mansion, in Hatton Fields, was built by Fred Ruhl in 1924/1925 for real estate developer Paul Aiken Flanders. March 23, 1989 (#89000228)
Our House		Santa Fe Street 4 NW 6th Avenue	Hugh W. Comstock	Storybook-style	1928	Comstock 5th cottage in Carmel that he designed and built in 1928, for $1,900 for Carmel resident Elizabeth Armstrong. It features a steeply pitched roof, irregularly shaped Carmel-stone fireplace.
Las Olas Cottage		Carmelo Street 5 NW of Ocean Avenue	Edward Mestres	Cotswold Vernacular	1925	Early Carmel cottage. Edward Mestres did the facade and landscape stonework. Good example of Carmel's Chalkstone. The original owner was Vivian McEwen, wife of Alan McEwen a political editor for the San Francisco Call. On December 18, 2019 the Carmel Department of Community Planning and Building and Kent L. Seavey made a determination that the property does not constitute an historic resource and is ineligible for the Carmel Inventory of Historic Resources.
La Playa Hotel		Camino Real and 8th Avenue	Chris Jorgensen	Mediterranean Revival	1905	September 21, 2002
Rose Cottage		4th Avenue and Monte Verde Street	Michael J. Murphy	American Craftsman	1906	Mary Hunter Austin hired M.J. Murphy in 1907 to create a Craftsman-style cottage she called "Rose Cottage." The property is located at the intersection of 4th Avenue and Monte Verde Street. At this cottage, she entertained her friends, including London, Sterling, and Lewis. In 1906, she had a "Wick-I-Up" tree house constructed by builder Murphy, based on the design of San Francisco architect Louis Mullgardt. She wrote much of her writings from this treetop.
Richardson Log Cabin		Monte Verde Street	Unknown	Log cabin	1902 (or 1903)	May 20, 2002
George Sterling House		Northeast of Ocean Avenue and Junipero Street	W.W. Woods and Gene Fenelon	American Craftsman	1905	George Sterling brought two boyhood friends, W.W. Woods and Gene Fenelon, to Carmel to construct an American Craftsman cottage on a hilltop in the Eighty Acres tract northeast of Ocean Avenue and Junipero Street. Artist Charles Rollo Peters and Robinson Jeffers were influential in Sterling's move to Carmel. In 1913, James Hopper and his wife purchased the cottage, when Sterling returned to San Francisco.
Selner Cottage			Lynn Charles Taylor	Vernacular	1945, 1986	The Selner Cottage was built in 1945 as a one-story, 500 square-foot wood cottage. The Cottage has undergone significant transformations over the years, most notably in 1986 when architect Lynn Charles Taylor designed a cedar-shingled three-story addition that blends with the original structure.
Sunset Center		San Carlos Street	John J. Donovan	Gothic Revival	1852	January 9, 1998 (#97001604)
Sunwiseturn Cottage		North Casanova Street and Palou Avenue	Hugh W. Comstock	Tudor Storybook architecture	1929	Sunwiseturn, also known as the Elsbeth Rose Cottage, was the last of the Comstock cottages that was built. It has the signature irregularly Carmel-stone chimney.
Tor House and Hawk Tower		26304 Ocean View Avenue	Robinson Jeffers		1962	October 10, 1975 (#75000444)
Benjamin Turner House		Monte Verde Street SE of 5th Avenue	Benjamin Turner	Vernacular	1898	Benjamin "Ben" Turner came to Carmel City as a master stonemason. He built a brick house at Monte Verde Street SE of 5th Avenue. His son Harry became a stonemason.
Mrs. Clinton Walker House		26336 Scenic Road	Frank Lloyd Wright	Organic architecture	1951	September 19, 2016 (#16000634)
Denny-Watrous Studio		East side of Dolores Street and 2nd Avenue	Hazel Watrous	American Craftsman-style	1922	The Denny-Watrous Studio was designed by Hazel Watrous. Dene Denny and Hazel Watrous booked their own concerts and events in 1925 and 1926 in their American Craftsman-style home in Carmel-by-the-Sea, on the east side of Dolores Street, now called "Harmony House."
George Whitcomb House		W. Mission Street between Vista and 1st Avenues	George Whitcomb	Cotswold-style	1926	This Cotswold-style house was built for master builder George Mark Whitcomb (1898-1981) and his family.
Whalers Cabin		Pt. Lobos State Natural Reserve	No style	Cabin	1850s	May 9, 2007 (#07000406)
Wilkinson House		Carl Bensberg	26018 Ridgwood Road	Tudor-style	1940	With a large Carmel stone chimney and industrial steel casement windows, the house boasts a blend of traditional and modern architecture.
Jacob W. Wright House		Santa Fe Street NE of 8th Avenue	George Whitcomb	Vernacular	1931	The Jacob W. Wright House (No. 2) was built in 1931 for Jacob W. Wright, a retired newspaperman.
Ethel P. Young House		Southwest corner of Carmelo St. and 8th Avenue	Robert A. Stanton	Spanish Eclectic	1926	The Ethel P. Young House was designed by Robert A. Stanton and built by Fred Ruhl for Ethel Young, Stanton's mother-in-law.
Mabel Gray Young (Lachmund) House		25165 Lincoln Street	Michael J. Murphy	Redwood Cottage	1905	Wood-framed cottage built by Michael J. Murphy. Mabel Gray (Young) Lachmund was Carmel's first music teacher. She was trained as a pianist in London.

== See also ==
- National Register of Historic Places listings in Monterey County, California
- California Historical Landmarks in Monterey County
- California Register of Historical Resources
- List of Historic Homes in Carmel Point
- Timeline of Carmel-by-the-Sea, California
