= Elizabeth Skidmore Sasser =

Architectural historian (1918–2005)

Elizabeth Skidmore Sasser (March 5, 1918 – August 14, 2005) was an artist, educator, and architectural historian.

== Education ==
Sasser's undergraduate degree was from the School of Fine Arts at Ohio State University, and she went on to earn a Ph.D. from Ohio State University.

== Career ==
Texas Technological College hired Sasser in 1949 to teach watercolors courses and Freshmen design studios. Sasser and her husband taught art classes for the children of museum members at The Museum of Texas Technological College. During this era, Sasser's publications were in School Arts: the Arts Education Magazine, and address general art education topics such as teacher and parent engagement and individual projects such as three dimensional posters and sculpture. By 1963 Sasser was promoted to professor of architecture, and she was named Faculty Woman of the Year in 1965. In 1986, she transferred into the College of Architecture, and she retired in 1990.

Sasser authored multiple books, most notably Dugout to Deco: Building in West Texas, 1880–1930 that traces the history of West Texas architecture, The World of Spirits and Ancestors in the Art of Western Sub-Saharan Africa, and she contributed entries to the three-volume set edited by Paul Oliver, Encyclopedia of Vernacular Architecture of the World,

Sasser died on August 14, 2005.

== Selected publications ==
- Sasser, Elizabeth Skidmore (1969). Architecture of Ancient Peru. Nolan E. Barrick (First ed.). International Center for Arid and Semi-Arid Land Studies, Texas Technological College.
- Milosevich, Paul; Sasser, Elizabeth S. (1992). Out of the ordinary: the art of Paul Milosevich (2. [pr.] ed.). Lubbock, Tex: Texas Tech Univ. Pr. ISBN 978-0-89672-235-4.
- Skidmore, Elizabeth Sasser (1993). Dugout To Deco: Building In West Texas, 1880–1930. Texas Tech University Press.
- Sasser, Elizabeth (1995). The World of Spirits and Ancestors in the Art of Western Sub-Saharan Africa. Lubbock, Texas: Texas Tech University Press. ISBN 0896723461.
