= Alfred Burton =

Alfred Burton may also refer to:

- Alfred Edgar Burton (1857–1935), American explorer and academic, first Dean of the Faculty of MIT
- Alfred Henry Burton (c. 1834–1914), New Zealand photographer

== See also ==
- Burton (name)
