= Pedro Joseph de Lemos =

American painter (1882–1954)

Pedro de Lemos
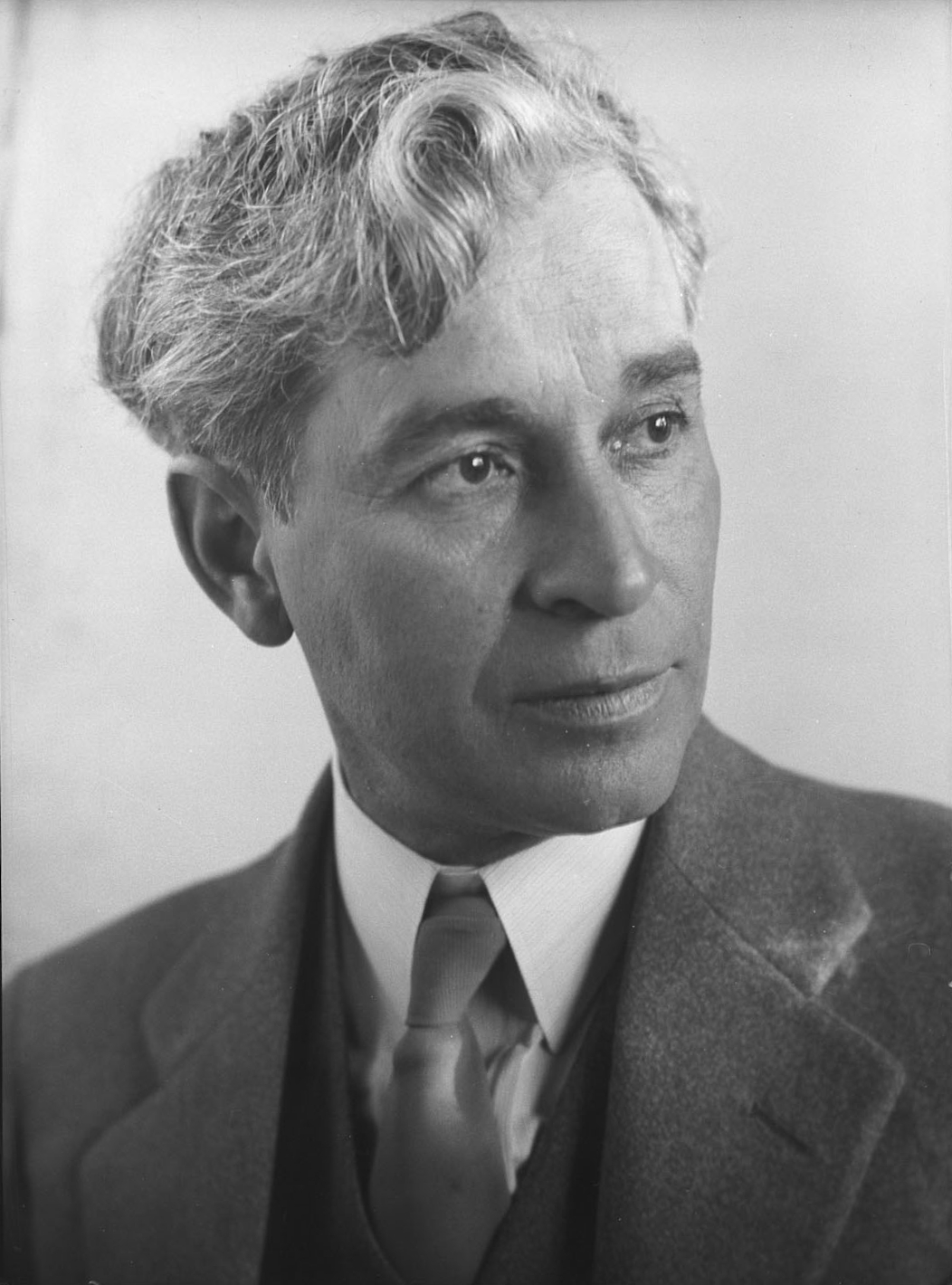
- Pedro J. Lemos
- Born: Pedro Joseph de Lemos; May 25, 1882; Austin, Nevada, U.S.
- Died: December 5, 1954 (aged 72); Palo Alto, California, U.S.
- Other name: Pedro Lemos
- Education: Art Students League of New York; Columbia University; San Francisco Art Institute
- Known for: Painting, drawing, printmaking, lecturer, writing, art educator
- Movement: Arts and Crafts Movement
- Spouse: Reta de Lemos

Pedro Joseph de Lemos (25 May 1882 – 5 December 1954) was an American painter, printmaker, architect, illustrator, writer, lecturer, museum director and art educator in the San Francisco Bay Area. Prior to about 1930 he used the simpler name Pedro Lemos or Pedro J. Lemos; between 1931 and 1933 he changed the family name to de Lemos, believing that he was related to the Count de Lemos (1576–1622), patron of Miguel de Cervantes. Much of his work was influenced by traditional Japanese woodblock printing and the Arts and Crafts Movement. He became prominent in the field of art education, and he designed several unusual buildings in Palo Alto and Carmel-by-the-Sea, California.

== Early life and education ==
Pedro was born on 25 May 1882 in Austin, Nevada. The family settled on Myrtle Street in Oakland, California in 1888. Pedro's parents had emigrated from the Azores in Portugal in 1872.

He attended public schools and, as a teenager he studied art the Mark Hopkins Institute (now the San Francisco Art Institute) in San Francisco with Harry Stuart Fonda (1864–1942), Emile Gremke, and Mary Frances Benton. He returned to the latter school in 1910-11 and studied under Charles Chapel Judson (1864-1946), Harry Seawell, and Alice Brown Chittenden (1859–1944). In 1913 he studied in New York with George Bridgman at the Art Students League of New York and with Arthur Wesley Dow at Columbia University in New York City.

== Early career ==
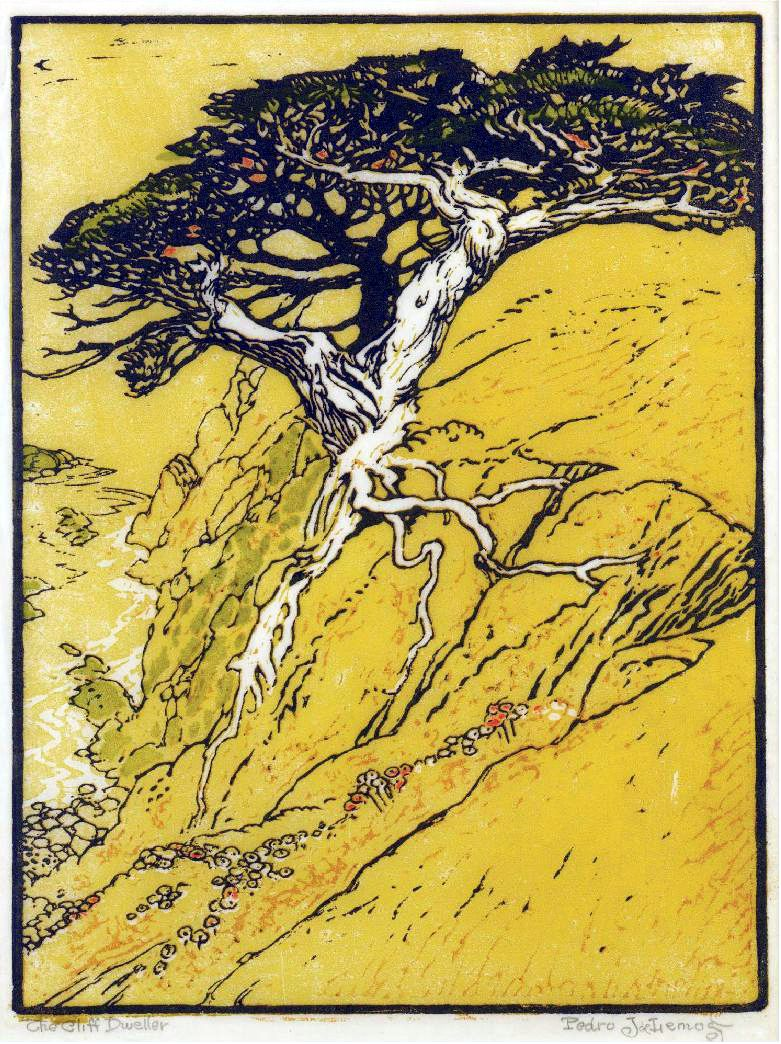
"The Cliff Dweller"

He was employed by Pacific Press Publishing Company in Oakland from 1900 to 1904. In 1904 he and his brother John started an engraving firm in San Francisco, which was destroyed in the 1906 earthquake and fire. In 1907 he married Reta Bailey of Berkeley and the three brothers, with two additional partners, started Lemos Illustrating Company in Oakland, continuing as Lemos Brothers, Artists and Engravers to 1911. Later this became known as the Lemos Brothers Art and Photography Studio, which offered art classes in copper, leather and landscaping as well as the traditional media of drypoint, etching and illustrating.

== Teaching ==
In 1911 he began teaching decorative design at the San Francisco Institute of Art. In late 1912 he was one of the founders the California Society of Etchers, and the following year he started offering the Institute's first classes in printmaking. Some of his students, such as William S. Rice and John W. Winkler (1894-1979), went on to achieve significant fame as printmakers. He helped organize the California print section of the 1915 Panama–Pacific International Exposition (PPIE). He had five works in the PPIE exposition and received an honorable mention.

He served as director of the San Francisco Institute of Art from 1914 to 1917.

== Museum director ==
Under pressure to incorporate modernist art trends like cubism in the curriculum of the San Francisco Institute of Art, he resigned in the fall of 1917 to become director of the art museum and gallery at Stanford University. He continued in that role and teaching at Stanford until his retirement in 1945, and he organized an active schedule of diverse exhibitions. In March 1922 he presented at Stanford the first solo exhibition of his own work, a collection of pastels, and in August 1922 an article about him was featured in the American Magazine of Art. He continued to exhibit his work in many media at Stanford and elsewhere, and for several years he taught summer art classes as far away as Chicago.

== Writings ==
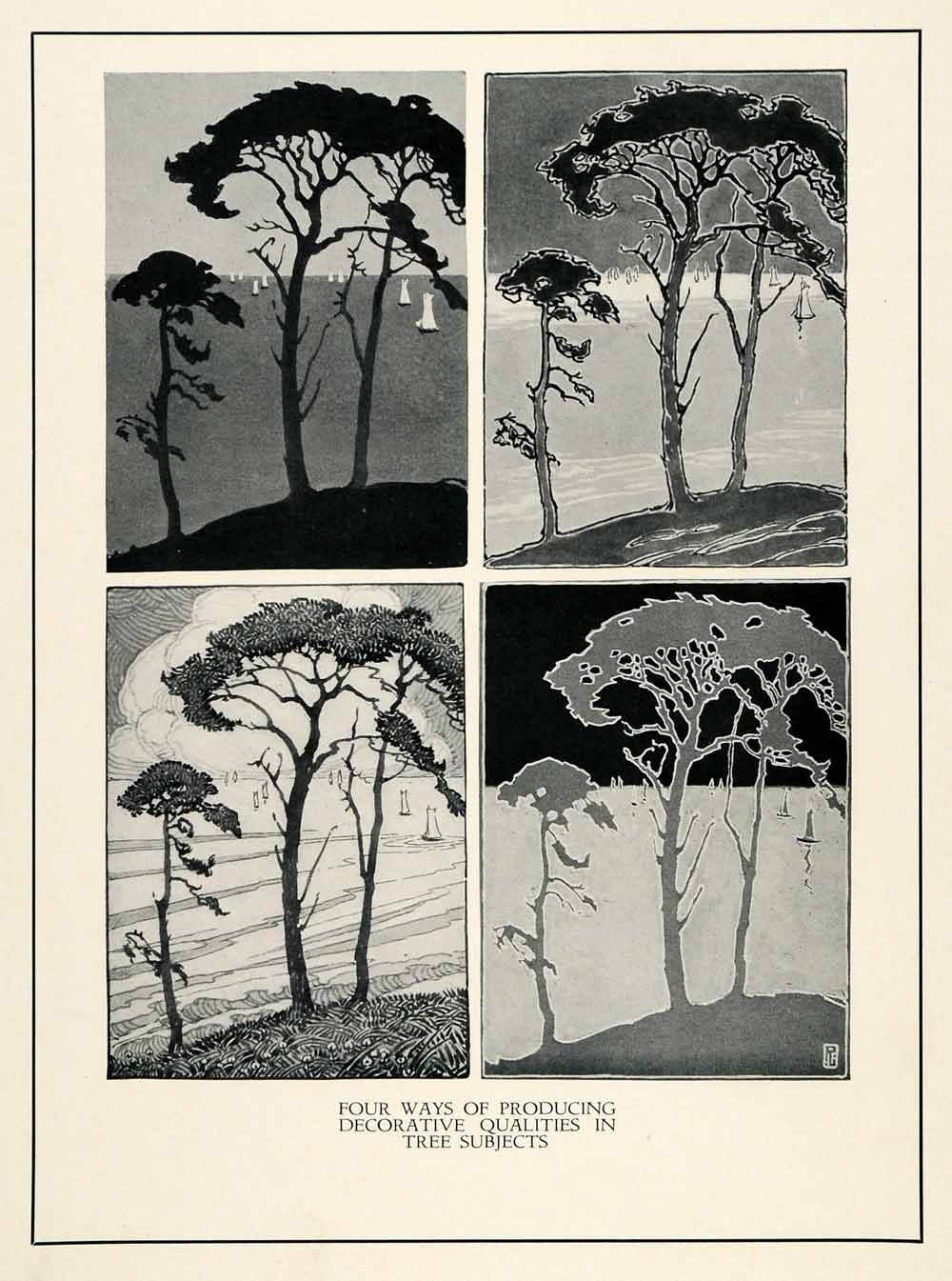
From his book "Applied Art", first published 1920

He became a prolific author of articles and books on Mexican and Native American crafts and on the teaching of arts and crafts. In 1920 he and his brother John T. Lemos co-authored Art Simplified: A Book of Practical Art for Advertisers, Commercial Artists, Teachers and Students, published by the Prang Company. Applied Art: Drawing, Painting, Design and Handicraft (Pacific Press Publishing Association, 1920) became a popular textbook for elementary and high school art classes that was revised and reprinted more than a dozen times through the 1940s. Many short pieces appeared in the SchoolArts Magazine, where de Lemos served as editor-in-chief from 1919 to 1950. The 1922 book Color Cement Handicraft by Pedro and Reta Lemos, with an emphasis on decorative tiles, was reprinted in 2007 as Arts & Crafts Era Concrete Projects. He wrote Correlated art for advanced schools, books 1-3, that were published by Abbott Educational Co. on March 26, 1927.

When he taught art at Mark Hopkins, the Institution paid for the first time. He is editor of "Applied art", the best art text-book on the market today. When he took it over he tripled the subscription list. He is now Art Curator at Stanford University. No one wonders. We are glad he summers in Carmel.

— Carmel Pine Cone

== Architecture ==
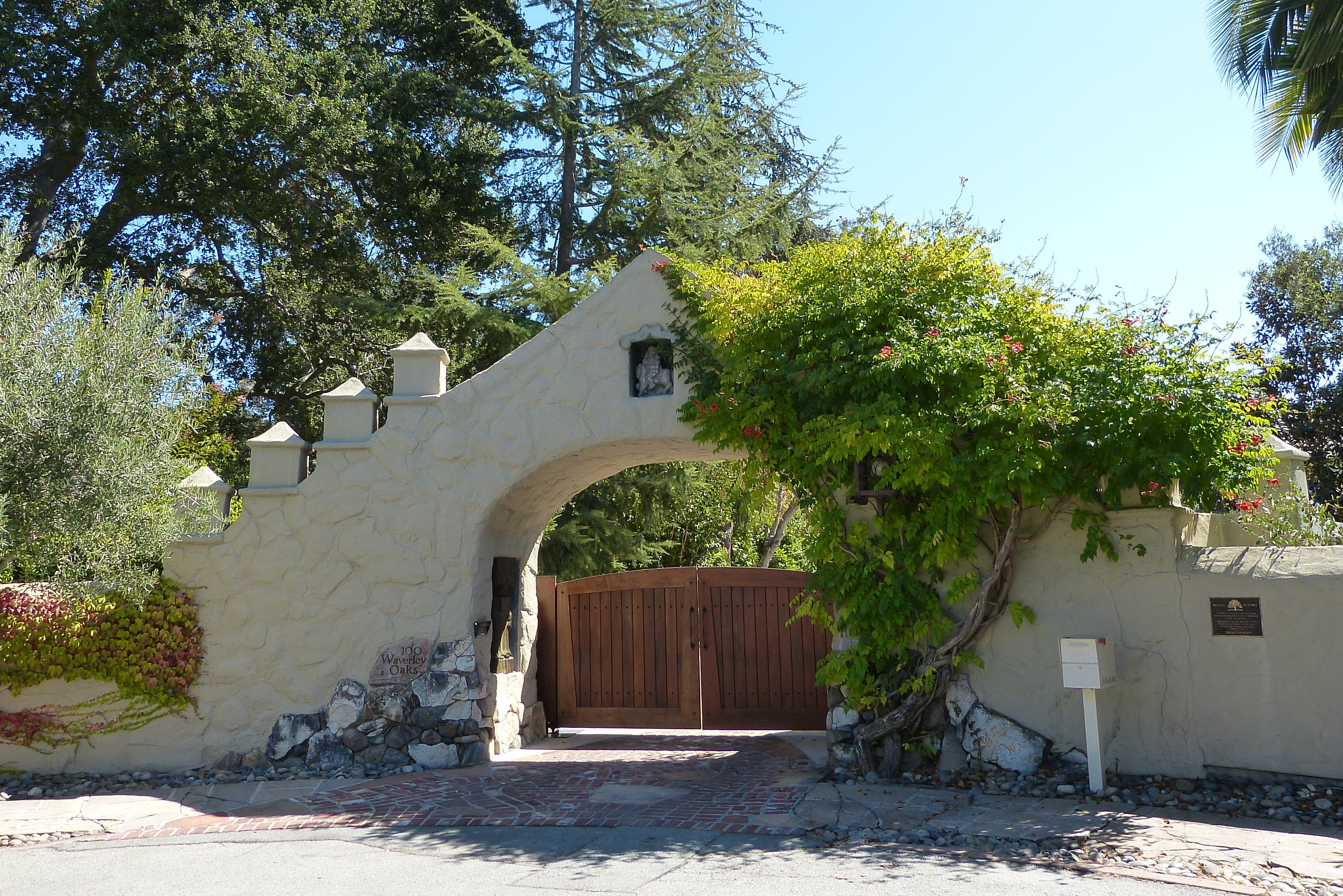
Front Gate to Pedro de Lemos House

In 1922, there had been an old oak tree in Palo Alto that was cut down, de Lemos was upset by the cutting of this old tree and in reaction he bought up a parcel of land on Ramona Street (near University Avenue) in order to save the oak trees. Between the 1920s until the late 1930s, de Lemos designed and built multiple buildings in Palo Alto, California including 520-526 Ramona Street and across the street at 533-539 Ramona Street, 460 Churchill Avenue (built in 1925) in order to house his art studio, and four Medieval Revival houses at 1550-1560-1566-1579 Cowper Street (built in the 1930s).

In 1928, after meeting with the owners of the property, the Merners, Pedro and his wife Reta became involved in the founding, design and administration of the Allied Arts Guild in Menlo Park, California. He and his wife had already engaged in developing similar groups of art studios and shops in Carmel and Palo Alto. The Spanish Colonial style architecture for the six Allied Arts Guild buildings were designed by Pedro de Lemos and Gardner Dailey (1895-1967).

In 1927, de Lemos bought an Art Shop (later named the Tuck Box) and adjacent property and built the Lemos Building, a fairy-tale cottage for himself at the rear of property in 1929. He built the Garden Shop Addition in 1931, with a three-sided window bay, Carmel stone, and shingled roof, that blends in with the other two buildings.

Between 1931 and 1941 de Lemos developed his own home with nearly 9,000 square feet on Waverley Oaks in Palo Alto, the Pedro de Lemos House (or Hacienda de Lemos, Waverley Oaks) is Spanish Colonial Revival architecture and is on the National Register of Historic Places since 1979.

In 1944, Lemos began work on a "Storybook" house in Pebble Beach, known as the “Gingerbread House” or “Casita de Lemos” (Little house of Lemos). The cottage was a guest house for a larger home planned for the property. He completed only the garage and poured concrete roof.

== Death ==
Lemos died 5 December 1954, in his home in Palo Alto, California at the age of 72.

== Associations ==
In August 1927, de Lemos was elected the first president of the Carmel Art Association in Carmel-by-the-Sea, California, but refused to attend most of the meetings in a bitter dispute over juried exhibitions. He also belonged to the Bohemian Club, Palo Alto Art Association, Chicago Society of Etchers, Pacific Art League, and other organizations. In 1943 he was elected a Fellow of the Royal Society of Arts in London.
