= August Englund =

American policeman

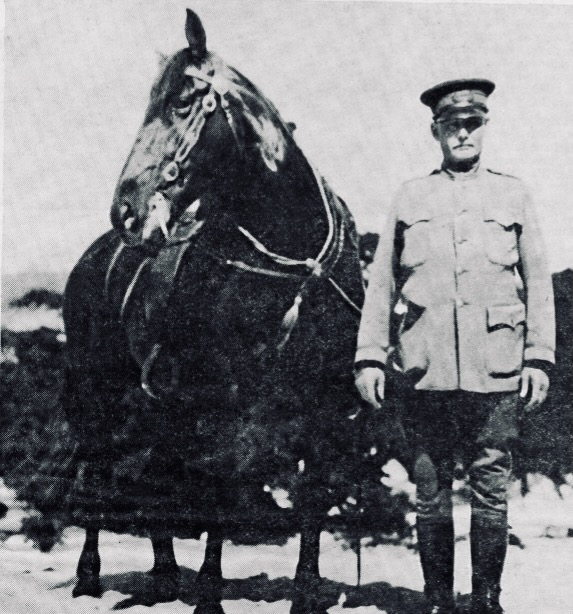
- Englund and Beauty ca. 1916
- Born: August O. Englund; November 16, 1868; Sweden
- Died: 2 November 1935 (aged 66); San Francisco, California, US
- Occupation: Chief of police
- Spouse: Ella L. Kuhiltz
- Children
- Military career
- Allegiance: United States of America
- Branch: United States Army
- Service years: 1896–1899
- Rank: Sergeant
- Commands: 4th Cavalry Regiment
- Conflicts: Spanish–American War; Boer War

August "Gus" Englund (November 16, 1868 – November 2, 1935) was an American chief of police of Monterey, California, who served as Carmel-by-the-Sea's first police chief at the one-man police department for nearly 20 years.

== Early life ==
Englund was born in Sweden. He served in the King's Dragoons for several terms. He participated in the Boer War in China. Englund left for America in 1892.

Englund married Ella Allbright on June 20, 1905, at the Ebenezer Lutheran Church in San Francisco. She was previously widowed.

== Career ==
After his return to the United States, Englund initially joined the police force at Yosemite National Park, where he maintained order and ensured the safety of visitors. In 1900, he served in China as part of the Quartermaster Corps. Continuing his journey, Englund worked alongside the 15th Cavalry Regiment at Sequoia National Park in 1901. Seeking new opportunities, he ventured to Dawson City and St. Michael, Alaska in 1902, where he engaged in the gold rush.

In 1903, Englund came to Monterey where he found employment at the Monterey Presidio. He then joined the Monterey Police Force from 1905 to 1906. Following the 1906 San Francisco earthquake, he temporarily left his role in the police department to join the San Francisco Pinkerton Police Force. From 1911 to 1913 he served as Chief of Police in Monterey, then returned to San Francisco where he did special police duty for the Panama–Pacific International Exposition in San Francisco from 1913 to 1914.

Carmel's Police Department began with the incorporation of the village of Carmel in the autumn of 1916. Englund was appointed as the city marshal and tax collector by the Carmel city trustees. Englund patrolled the streets of Carmel alone on horseback ensuring that chickens stayed off Ocean Avenue. A journalist from Detroit wrote in 1930 that Englund was "perhaps one of the best known policemen in the west." He served as chief of police in Monterey until 1933.

In January 1935, Englund slipped and fell on the rocky shores of Monterey Bay. He was leading the search for a dead body in Carmel Point, who had drowned at the water's edge at Cooke's Cove in Carmel Bay. The fall resulted in a severe foot injury, and infection set in a few days later. Englund was admitted to the San Francisco Veterans Hospital, where his leg was amputated to stop the spreading infection. Despite this the infection persisted. He resigned as police chief of Carmel on 29 January as a result.

== Death ==
On November 2, 1935, Englund died at the age of 66, at the San Francisco Veterans Hospital.

== See also ==
- Timeline of Carmel-by-the-Sea, California
