= Jeanne D'Orge =

Carmel-by-the-Sea artist (1877-1964)

- Born: Lena Dalkeith Yates; November 22, 1877; Donisthorpe, England
- Died: May 2, 1964 (aged 86); Carmel-by-the-Sea, California, US
- Occupations: Artist, writer and poet
- Known for: Carl Cherry Center for the Arts
- Spouses: Alfred Edgar Burton (m. 1906; div. 1925) Carl William Cherry (m. 1931)
- Children: 3

Jeanne D'Orge (November 22, 1877 – May 2, 1964) was a British-born American lyric poet, artist, and patron of the arts. She founded the Carl Cherry Center for the Arts in Carmel-by-the-Sea, California, United States, for artists and writers, and where actors and musicians perform.

== Early life ==
Jeanne D'Orge was born on November 22, 1877, in Donisthorpe North West Leicestershire, England. Her father deserted the family when she was at an early age. He was a seed merchant. D'Orge and her mother traveled to Edinburgh, London, and Paris. In 1955, D'Orge wrote and published Voice in the Circle, a book of verse on her childhood experiences in Europe.

During a walking trip in Paris, she met and later married Alfred Edgar Burton in 1906, in Ashby-de-la-Zouch, England. Burton was a geographer and was widowed with two sons. Together they had three children. Her daughter Virginia Lee Burton became an illustrator and children's book author.

== Career ==
In 1906, D'Orge, Burton, and their three children arrived in Newton Centre, Massachusetts, and moved to on Beacon Hill. During this period, D'Orge wrote children's books under the pseudonym Lena Dalkeith, a name she borrowed from a village located near Edinburgh. These included Aesop's Fables, Little Plays, and Stories from French History.

Her poems were published in Scribner's Magazine and Poetry. She participated in the poetry reading at the New York Armory Show in 1913. In 1915, she released a collection of verse titled Prose Chants, published under the pen name Lena Dalkeith Burton.

In 1917, due to the Massachusetts winters taking a toll on D'Orge's health, the family moved to San Diego, California. At that time, Burton, who was nearing his retirement after a forty-year tenure at MIT, took a leave of absence.

=== Carmel-by-the-Sea ===
In 1925, D'Orge left Burton for one of his former students, Carl Cherry, who was 24 years younger than her and 48 years younger than Burton.

In December 1928, she wrote the book Lobos, published by Seven Arts Press. The black and white cover was designed by D'Orge. A review published in the Carmelite said: "One feels in reading these poems that Lobos has been translated perfectly into the most elusive language, Poetry."

On March 30, 1931, she married Cherry in San Benito, California. Upon moving in with Cherry, D'Orge had adopted the name Jeanne D'Orge permanently, in honor of Joan of Arc and the Orge River in France.

Cherry encouraged her to take up painting, and she began to paint. In 1957, D'Orge's paintings were displayed at the Santa Barbara Museum of Art. Because of the cost of canvas, she began painting on window shade material and various remnants from Cherry's workshop, including masonite, glassine, and aluminum. She experimented with layering machine oil as a base. Her process involved tools, such as brushes, whiskbrooms, forks, fingers, and combs, allowing her to manipulate the paint and create a unique texture and form. The resulting artworks emitted a distinctive soft outline, at times evoking ritual processions of somber-hued hooded figures. D'Orge's artwork varied in style, with some resembling Chinese landscapes, while others took on a more surreal and abstract form. In January 1962, she had a solo exhibition at San Francisco's De Young Museum. The exhibition displayed forty-seven of her paintings.

=== Carl Cherry Center for the Arts ===
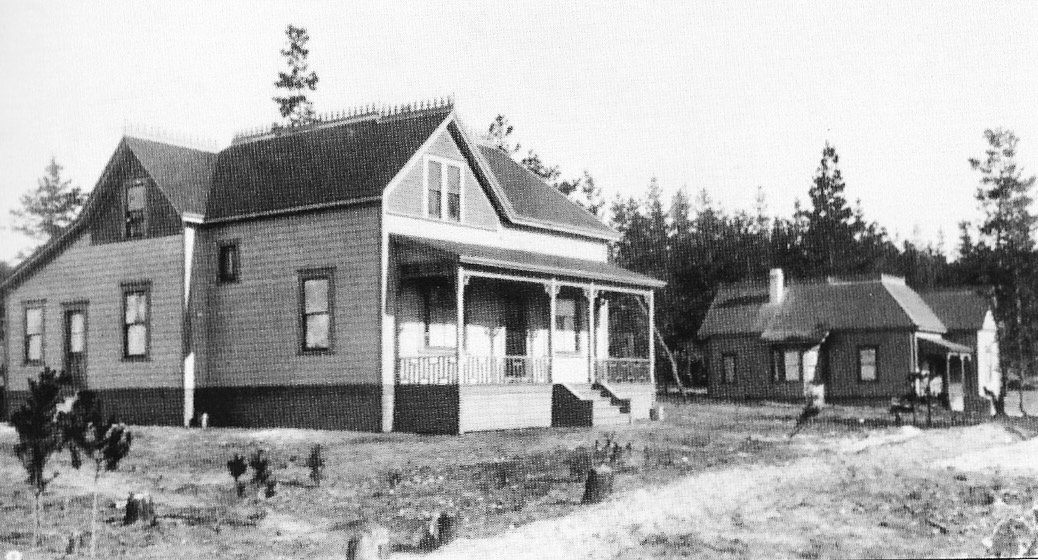
Two Queen Anne–style cottages. The one on the left was built for Augusta Robertson (later the Carl Cherry Center for the Arts) and the one on the right was for Abbie Jane Hunter.

In June 1948, D'Orge established the Carl Cherry Foundation, a non-profit philanthropic organization. Its primary objectives were to run an art gallery, provide an experimental laboratory for scientists and inventors in Carmel, and offer assistance to "artists, authors, playwrights, and composers."

In 1952, D'Orge expanded the main building, adding classroom, gallery, and reading room spaces. The second story was removed to create a flat roof with skylights for natural light. She attached studio and meditation areas in 1953.

=== Carmel Valley ===
D'Orge eventually transitioned to a studio in Carmel Valley, where she continued painting and writing pursuits until her death in 1964.

== Death and legacy ==
D'Orge died at the age of 87, on May 2, 1964, in Carmel, California.

In 1992, the Carl Cherry Foundation changed its name to the Carl Cherry Center for the Arts. The foundation includes D'Orge's papers, comprising a permanent art collection of twelve hundred works from her portfolio, along with some memorabilia. Additionally, the collection houses a miscellaneous assortment of Burton family artifacts.
