= Johan Hagemeyer =

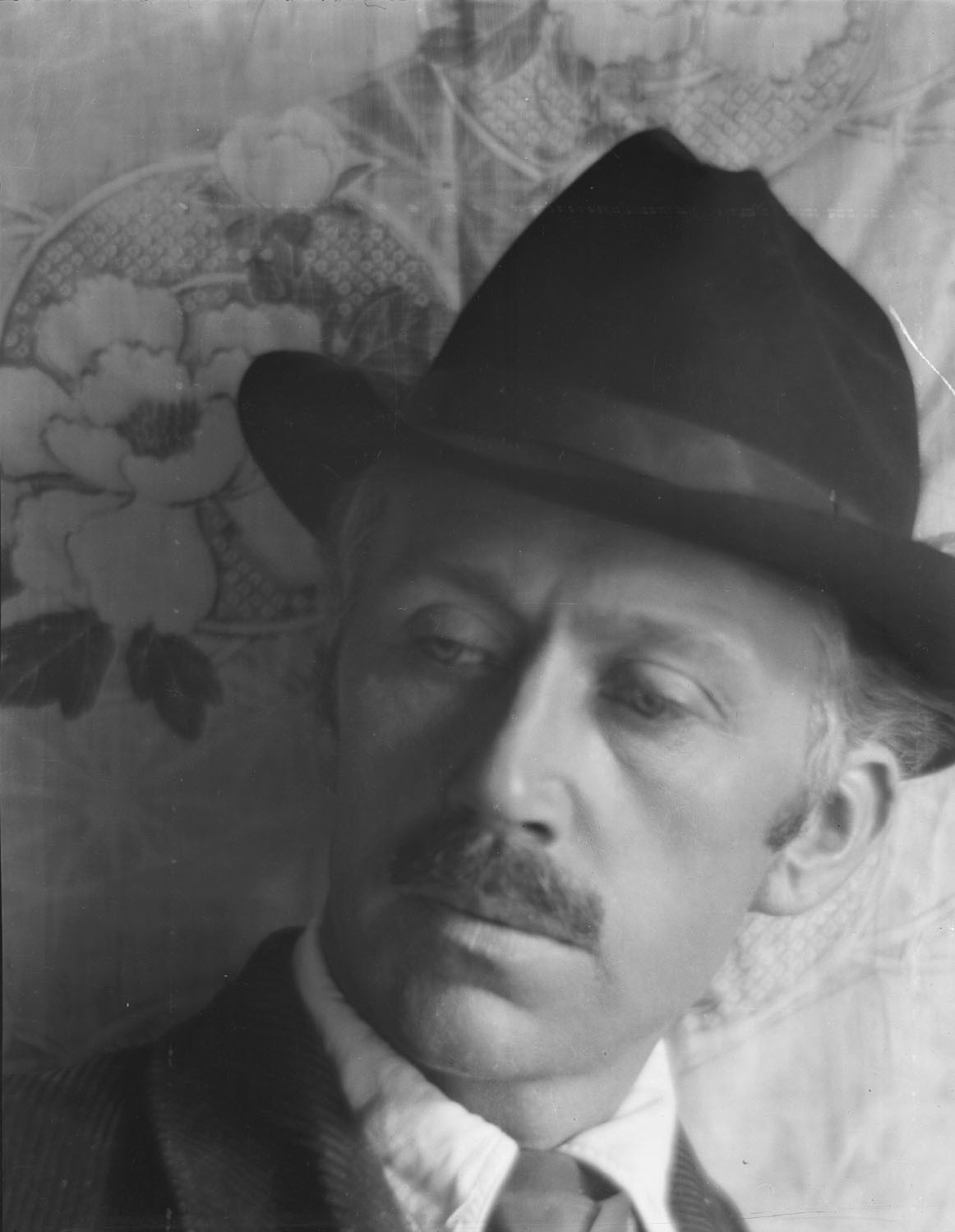
- Hagemeyer in 1923
- Born: June 1, 1884; Amsterdam, Netherlands
- Died: May 21, 1962 (aged 77); Berkeley, California, US
- Known for: Portraits of famous persons

Johan Hagemeyer (1 June 1884 – 21 May 1962) was a Dutch-born horticulturalist and vegetarian who is remembered primarily for being an early 20th century photographer and artistic intellectual.

== Life and work ==
Hagemeyer was born in Amsterdam, the Netherlands. His family came to California to grow fruit trees, but in 1916, he met photographer Alfred Stieglitz, who convinced him to devote his life to the then emerging world of artistic photography. In 1923, Hagemeyer opened a portrait studio in San Francisco, which he occupied primarily from October through early April.

In 1922 Hagemeyer built a spring-summer studio in Carmel-by-the-Sea, California, at that time the largest art colony on the Pacific coast, and donated his photographs that December to a local fund-raising exhibit. It was here that Hagemeyer met Edward Weston, who encouraged him to further his career in photography. He moved his Carmel address in 1924 to a new "artfully designed studio" at the prominent junction of Mountain View and Ocean Avenues, which became a meeting place for intellectuals as well as a "gallery" to display the works of local and visiting artists. The house (now the Forest Lodge) qualifies as a historically significant and was registered, by Kent L. Seavey, with the California Register of Historical Resources on June 17, 2002.

In 1928 he relocated to a significantly larger "Johan Hagemeyer Studio-Gallery," where he devoted an entire room to his own pictorial art and held major exhibitions of prominent Post-Impressionists painters, such as Henrietta Shore, as well as art photographers, including Edward Weston. In February 1932 at the Haggin Museum in Stockton, California Hagemeyer displayed his photographs in a joint exhibition with Carmel's most famous Impressionist painter, William Frederic Ritschel. Through the spring and summer of 1938 he exhibited his landscape and portrait photos at the Guild of Carmel Craftsmen.

From the 1920s through the 1940s Hagemeyer photographed leading figures of the day, including Pedro Joseph de Lemos, Albert Einstein, and Salvador Dalí. However, he sometimes retouched or manipulated his photos, which went against the beliefs of Weston. His refusal to adhere to Weston's views was a major cause in a growing alienation of the two men. When Weston, Ansel Adams and others founded Group f/64, devoted to straight, unmanipulated photography, Hagemeyer did not join.

== Death and legacy ==
Hagemeyer died on 21 May 1962 in Berkeley, California, at the age of 77. Funeral services were at the Little Chapel of the Flowers in Berkeley.

The Johan Hagemeyer Photograph Collection at the Bancroft Library at the University of California, Berkeley, contains the approximately 6,785 photographic prints and negatives which made up Hagemeyer's personal archive at the time of his death in Berkeley in 1962. A smaller collection of prints, negatives and correspondence is at the Center for Creative Photography (CCP) in Tucson, Arizona, and the CCP has released a digital catalog of Hagemeyer's photograph collection.
