= Daniel Trembly MacDougal =

American paleontologist, educator, and conservationist (1869–1945)

Daniel T. MacDougal
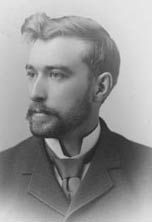
- Dr. Daniel Trembly MacDougal, botanist, plant biologist at the New York Botanical Garden.
- Born: March 16, 1865; Liberty, Indiana, US
- Died: 22 February 1958 (aged 93); Pacific Grove, California, US
- Education: DePauw University, Purdue University
- Spouse: Louise Fisher
- Scientific career
- Fields: Botanist, writer, plant biologist
- Workplaces: Carnegie Institution of Washington

Dr. Daniel Trembly MacDougal (March 16, 1865 – February 22, 1958) was an American botanist and writer. He is known for his work on desert ecology and as the earliest botanist to research Chlorophyll. He was the inventor of the MacDougal dendrograph, used to record changes in the volumes of tree trunks. He was a pioneer in studying the idea of Mutation Theory for controlling evolution. He helped to establish two botanical laboratories, the Desert Laboratory in Tucson, Arizona, and the Coastal Laboratory in Carmel-by-the-Sea, California.

== Early life ==
MacDougal was born on March 16, 1865, in Liberty, Indiana. His father was Alexander MacDougal (1832–1912) and his mother was Amanda Malvina Showalter (1834–1923). He married Louise Fisher on January 24, 1893. They had only one child during their marriage.

In 1894 he received his Master of Science from DePauw University. He received his Doctor of Philosophy from Purdue University. He subsequently held posts as a post doctoral studies at the universities of Leipzig and Tübingen, Germany.

== Career ==
MacDougal was employed by the United States Department of Agriculture to collect specimens in Arizona and Idaho during the summers of 1891 and 1892. He taught plant physiology at the University of Minnesota between 1893 and 1899. He was a member of the Tropical Plant Commission.

In 1904 he was promoted to Assistant Director. Here he began his experiments to prove the Mutation Theory, a theory stating that the evolution is a process of mutations that generate new species.

He attended the lectures, in United States, by Dutch botanist Hugo de Vries on Mutation Theory. In 1905 he helped published Hugo de Vries's lectures into a book Species and Varieties: Their Origin by Mutation.

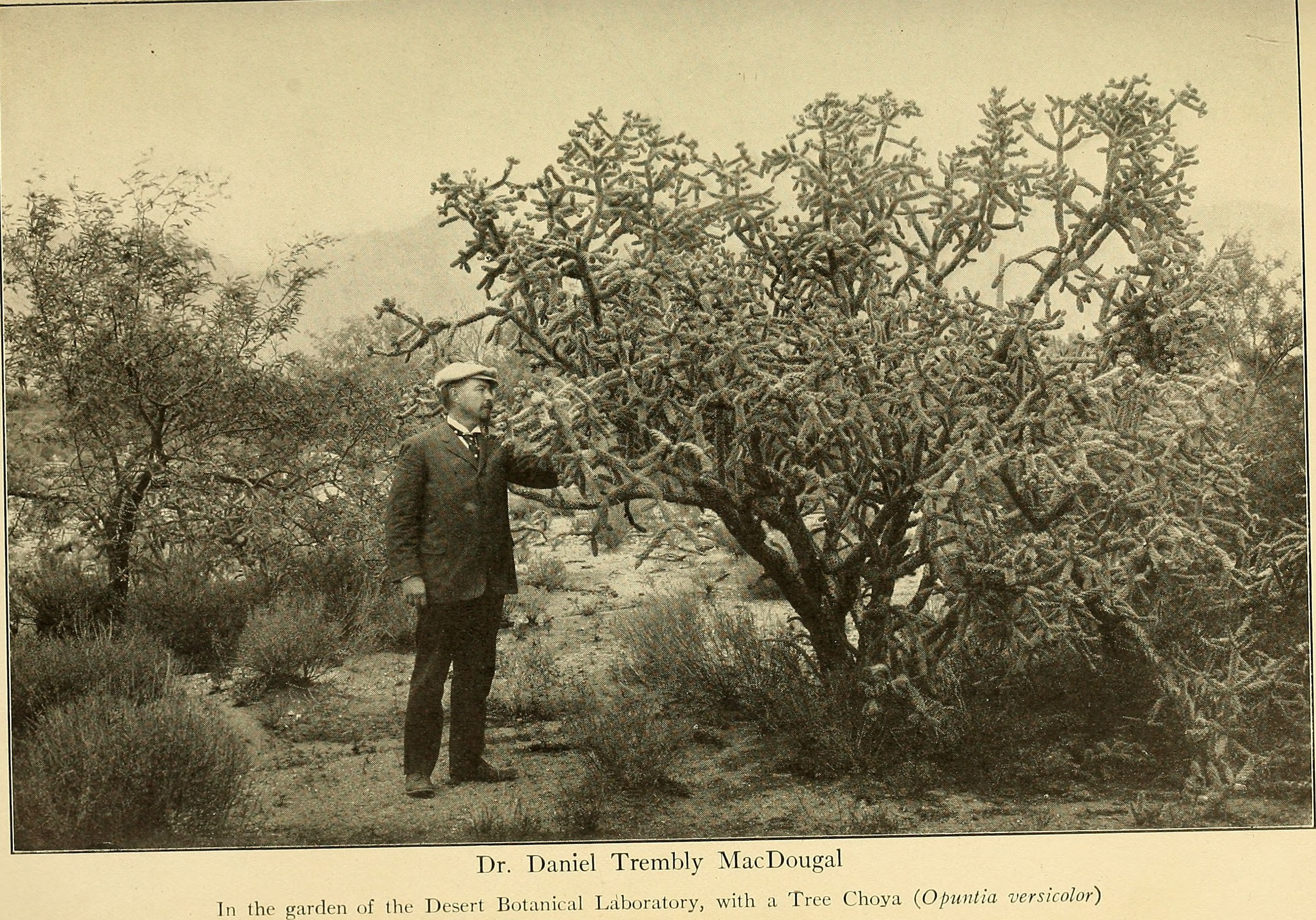
MacDougal in the garden of the Desert Botanical Laboratory, with a Tree Choya

MacDougal was seen as an expert on desert ecology. He was one of the first botanists to research Chlorophyll. In 1905 he was involved in the establishment of the Plant Desert Laboratory in Tucson, Arizona, where he continued his experiments for several years with breeding studies on the Oenothera (evening primrose). He became its first director.

In 1906 he became Director of Botanical Research at the Carnegie. He remained associated with this research institute until his retirement in 1933. At Carnegie, he made a contribution to plant ecology in 1918 with the invention of an auxographic instrument, the MacDougal dendrograph, an instrument for measuring the changes in the volumes of tree trunks. His dendrograph was used in the Forestry industry for studying tree growth.

== Carmel-by-the-Sea ==
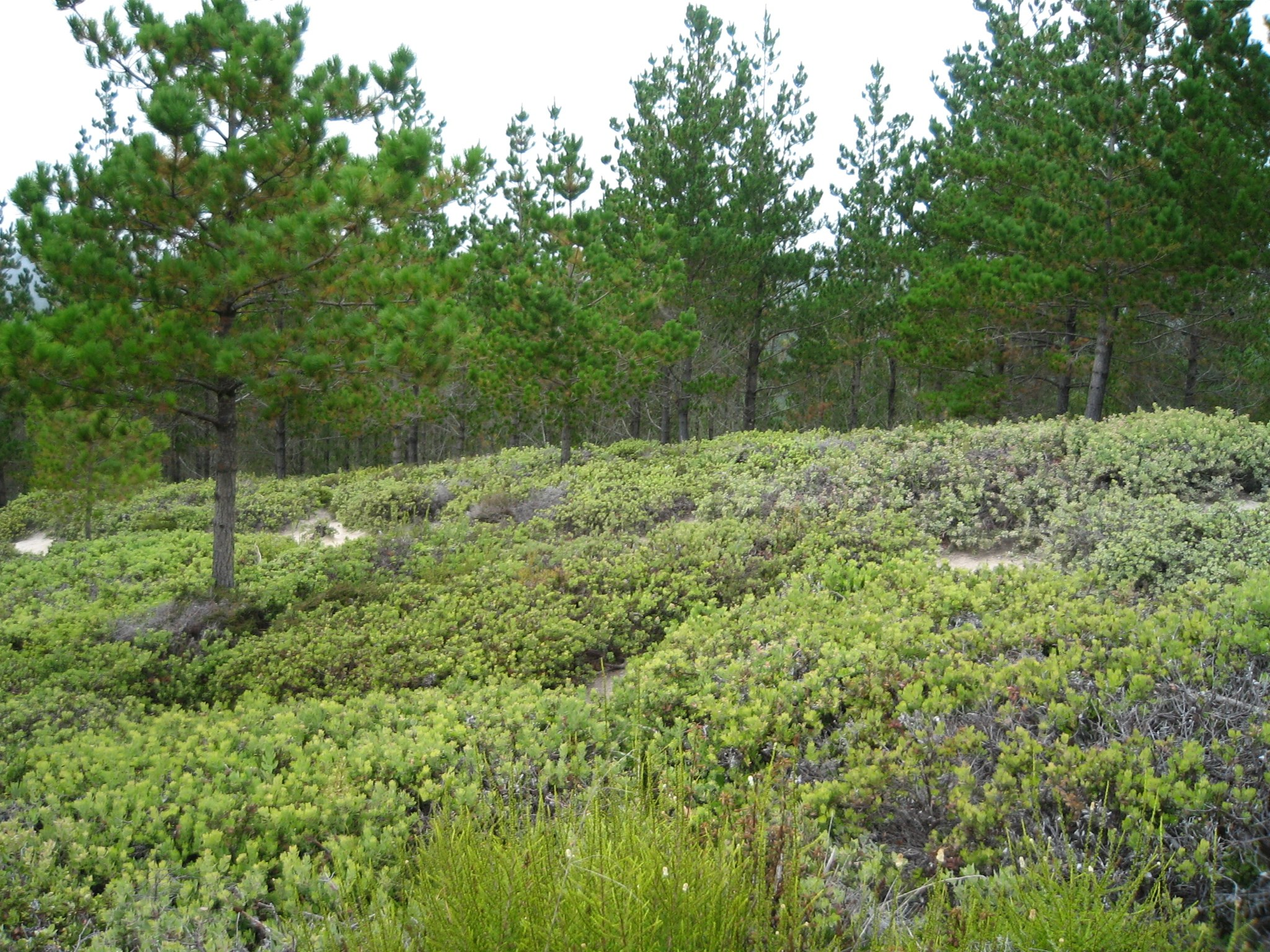
Pinus radiata young trees in Carmel, California

In 1909, MacDougal established the Coastal Laboratory at the Outlands in the Eighty Acres in Carmel-by-the-Sea, California, where he conducted research on the Monterey pine (Pinus radiata). At Carnegie, he wrote publications on the studies of tree growth and their hydrostatic systems. His book Growth in Trees was published in 1921 and encompasses 18 years of research in Arizona, California, Idaho, Mexico and the Libyan Desert. It was one of the first books to include information about the growth of trees across North America.

MacDougal studied the vegetation at the Salton Sea, a basin flooded with water from the Colorado River. In 1914, he wrote the book The Salton Sea: A Study of the Geography, the Geology, the Floristics, and the Ecology of the Desert Basin.

== Awards and honors ==
MacDougal received multiple honors in his lifetime. He was a member of several scientific organizations, including the Koninklijke Hollandsche Maatschappij der Wetenschappen and the American Academy of Arts and Sciences. He was an honorary member of the American Academy of Arts and Sciences and the Botanical Society of Scotland.

In 1956 he received a career award from the Botanical Society of America. He received honorary degrees from DePauw University in 1912 and the University of Arizona in 1915. In 1950 he was the honorary president of the International Botanical Congress in Stockholm. In 1956 he was awarded the New York Botanical Garden's first Certificate of Distinguished Service.

== Death ==
MacDougal died on February 22, 1958, in Pacific Grove, California, at the age of 92. Funeral services were held in the Little Chapel-by-the-Sea Crematorium in Pacific Grove. Inurnment was at St. Paul's Cemetery, Yakima, Washington.

== Publications ==
- Elementary plant physiology (1900)
- Mutants and hybrids of the Oenotheras (1905)
- Species and Varieties: Their Origin by Mutation (1905)
- Mutations, variations, and relationships of the Oenotheras (1907)
- The water-balance of succulent plants (1910)
- The Salton Sea: A Study of the Geography, the Geology, the Floristics, and the Ecology of the Desert Basin (1914)
- Hydration and growth (1920)
- Growth In Trees (1921)
