= Abbie Jane Hunter =

American real estate developer

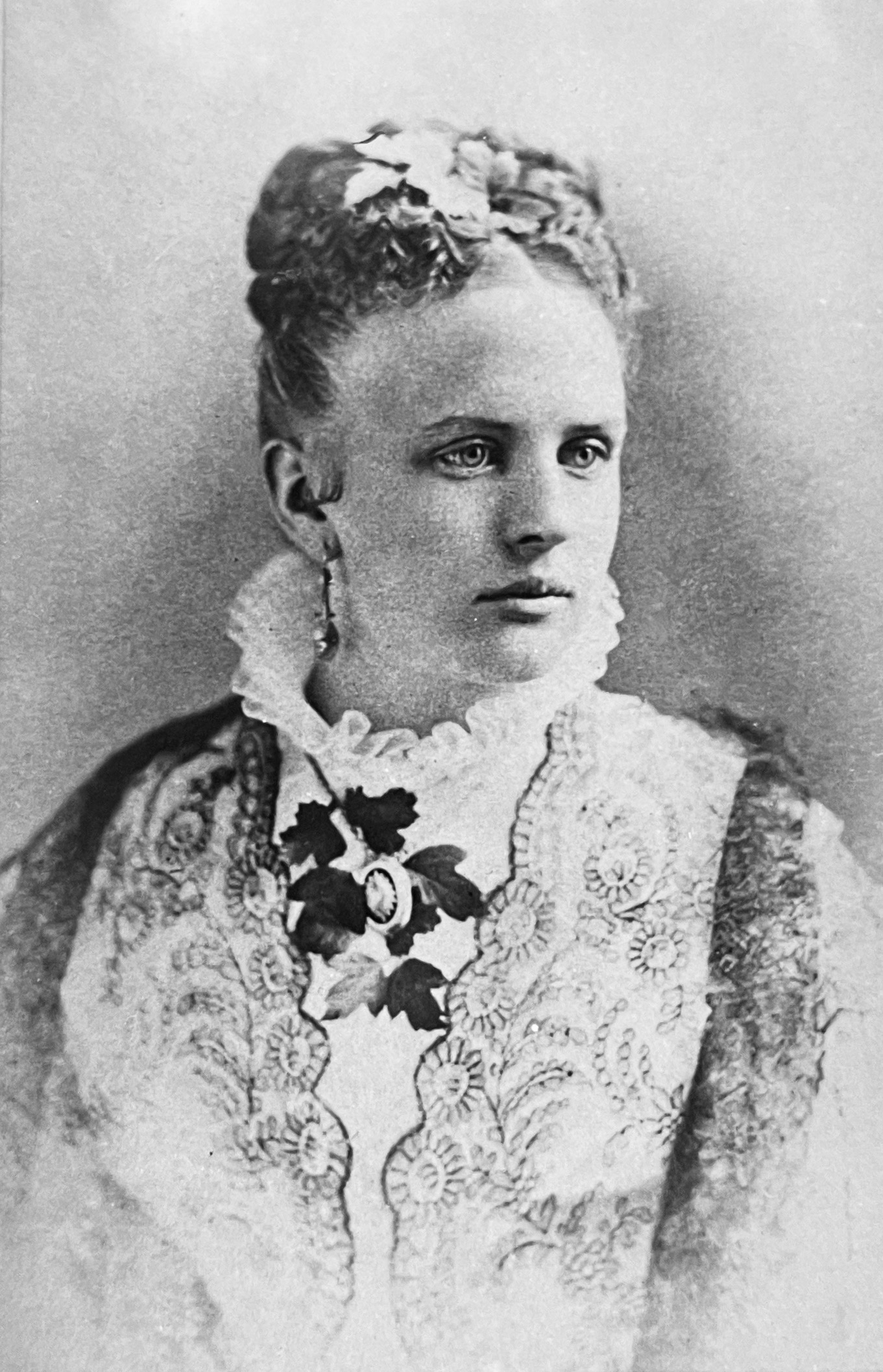
- Abbie Jane Hunter
- Born: Abigail Jones Goldsmith; 1856; San Francisco, California, US
- Died: Unknown
- Occupation: Real estate development
- Spouse: John J. Hunter
- Children: 1

Abigail Jane Hunter (1855–???) was a businesswoman and real estate developer in Carmel-by-the-Sea.

== Early life ==
Hunter was born in San Francisco, California, in 1855. She was the daughter of J. Gillet Goldsmith. and Annie Johnston (1820-1898). She married John J. Hunter on September 6, 1876 in San Francisco, and lived on 355 First Street. They had one child, Wesley R. Hunter (1876-1966), who was born on February 12, 1876, at San Francisco’s Hunters Point, named for his father. The Hunters were divorced on September 4, 1903, in San Francisco.

== Professional background ==
=== Carmel City ===
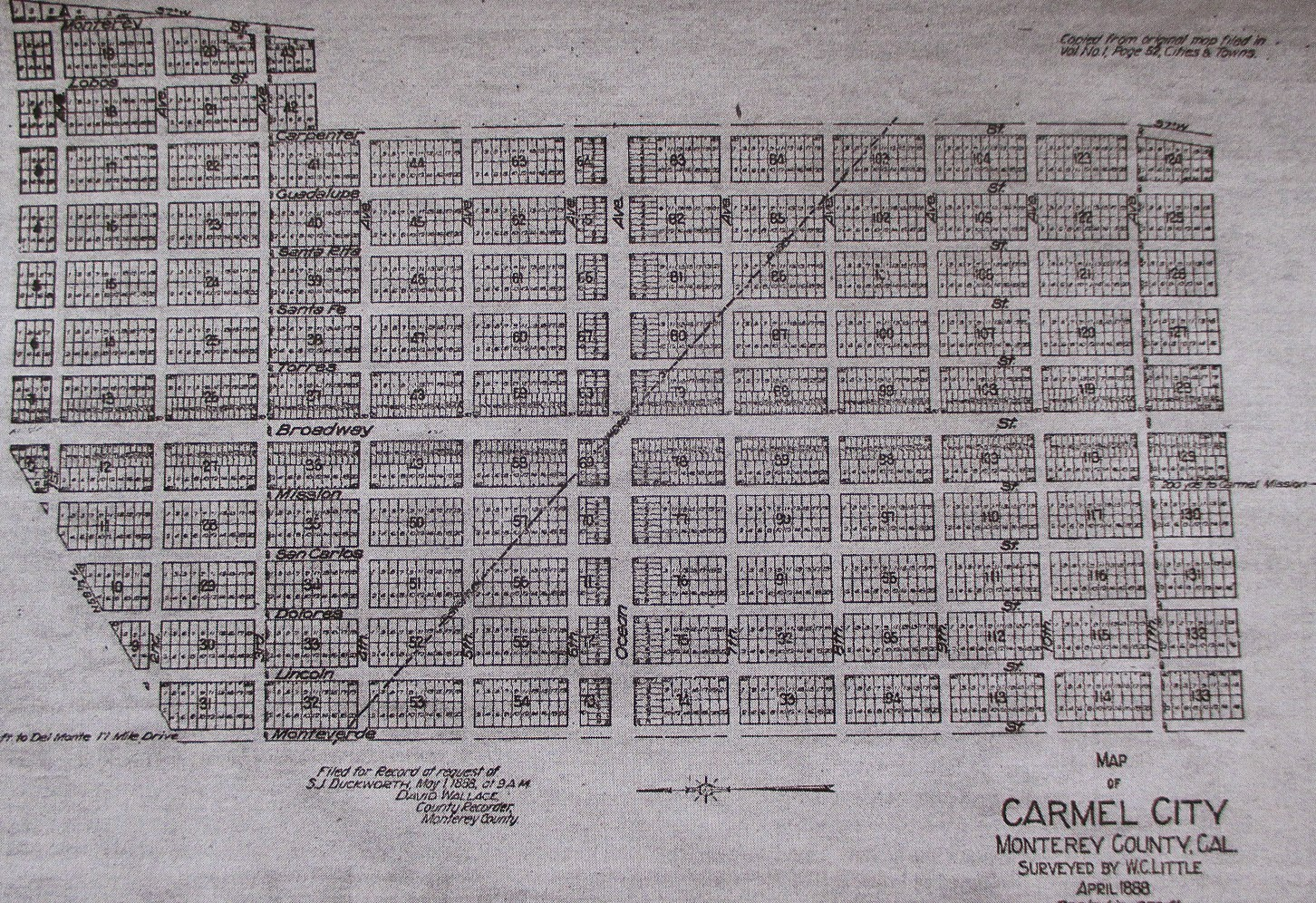
Carmel City Map by W. C. Little (1888).

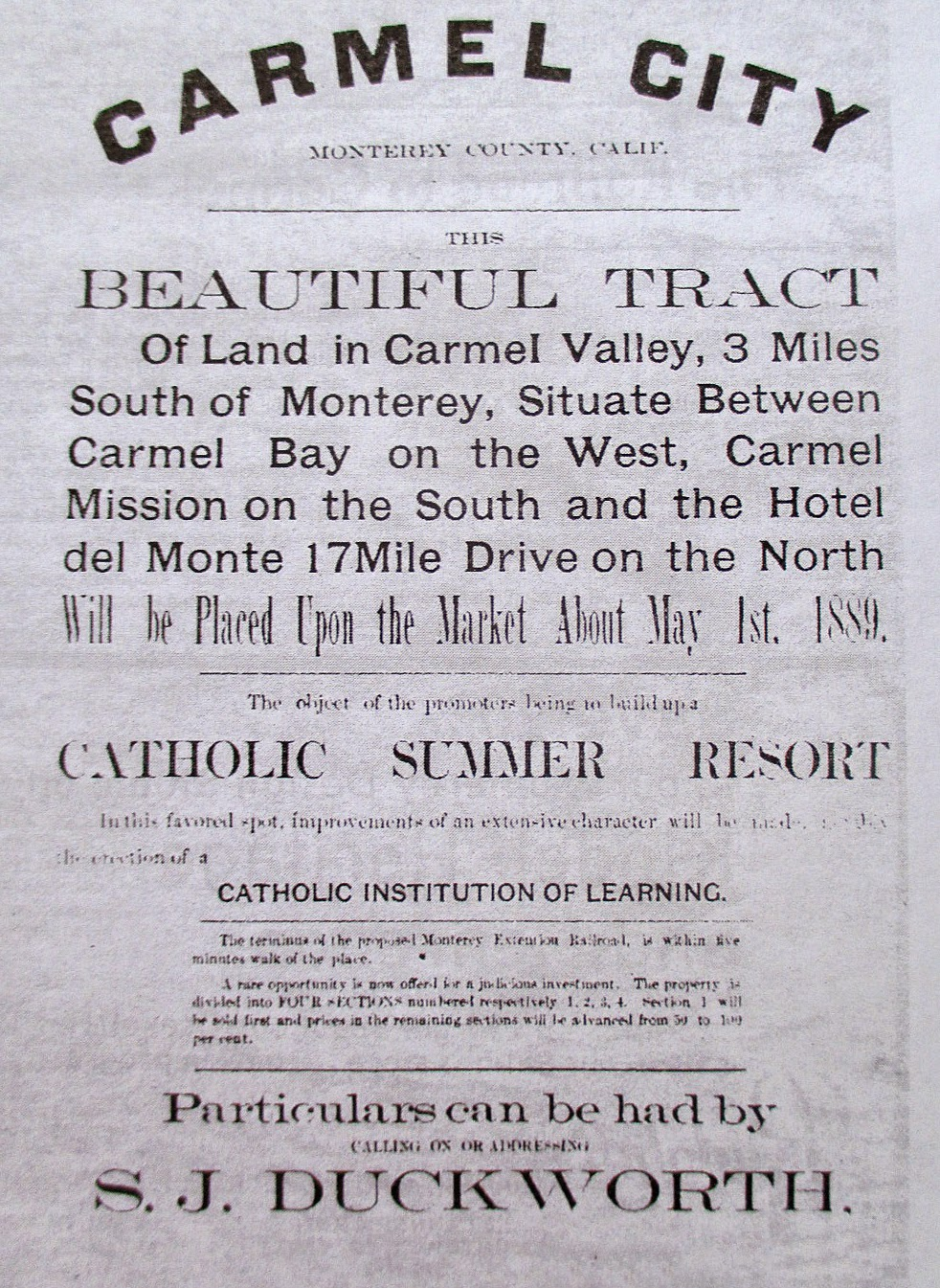
Carmel City Catholic Summer Resort advertisement.

In December 1889, Abbie Hunter bought 7 lots in Carmel City from Duckworth.

=== Women's Investment Company ===
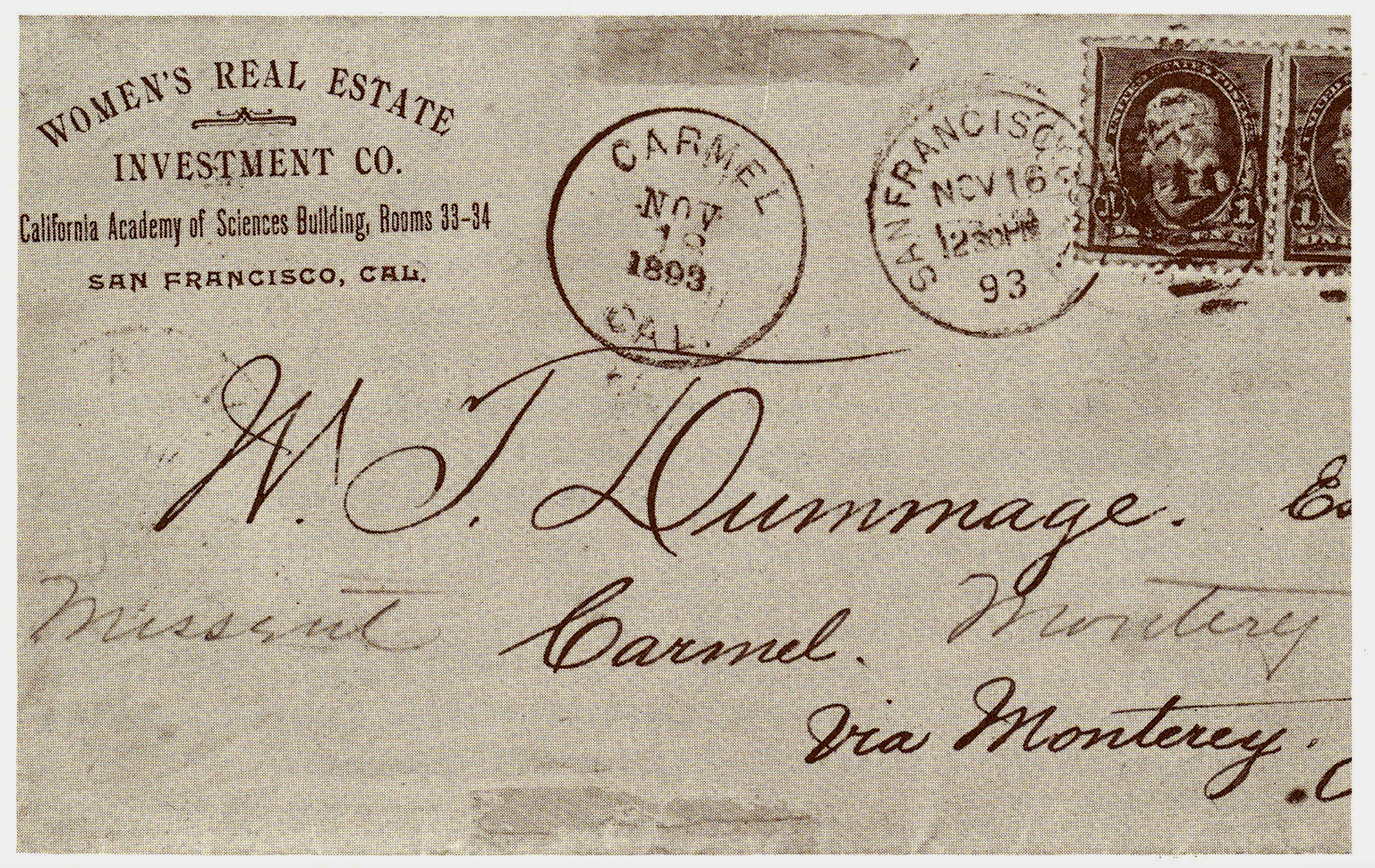
Women's Real Estate Investment Co. return address, addressed to W. T. Dummage in 1893.

She was appointed President of the Investment Company on August 16, 1891. The company headquarters were in the California Academy of Sciences building.

Hunter, of 355 First Street, was arrested in February 1892, when Duckworth brought charges of embezzlement. Duckworth said that Hunter was collecting money for her own use on property sold on the installment plan and that she had formed a conspiracy against Duckworth. It was also said that she transferred all her property to her mother, Annie Goldsmith.

In February 1895, Hunter was apprehended and arrested in San Francisco on a charge of obtaining money by false pretenses and failing to produce a deed to a client, Mary O'Donnell, who had bought a lot in the Sunnyside tract of San Francisco. Hunter was released on $3000 (equivalent to $116,100 in 2025) bail. The San Francisco court dropped the charges, but the bank foreclosed on her home in Carmel-by-the-Sea on Guadalupe Street and 4th Avenue.

=== Carmel-by-the-Sea ===
In 1892, Hunter sent out a bulk mailing postcard promoting Carmel-by-the-Sea instead of a Catholic retreat:

"Carmel-by-the-Sea an ideal summer resort! Just the place for summer homes and camping parties. Balmy Climate – Grand Bathing Beach – Excellent Trout Fishing. Pure mountain water supplied by the Pacific Improvement Co. Carriages meet all trains at Monterey. Building lots 40 x 100 can be purchased at slight cost and on very easy terms by applying to The Women’s Real Estate Investment Co., Rooms 53-54, Academy of Sciences Building, San Francisco."

== See also ==
- Timeline of Carmel-by-the-Sea, California
- List of Historic Buildings in Carmel-by-the-Sea
