= Gardner Dailey =

American architect

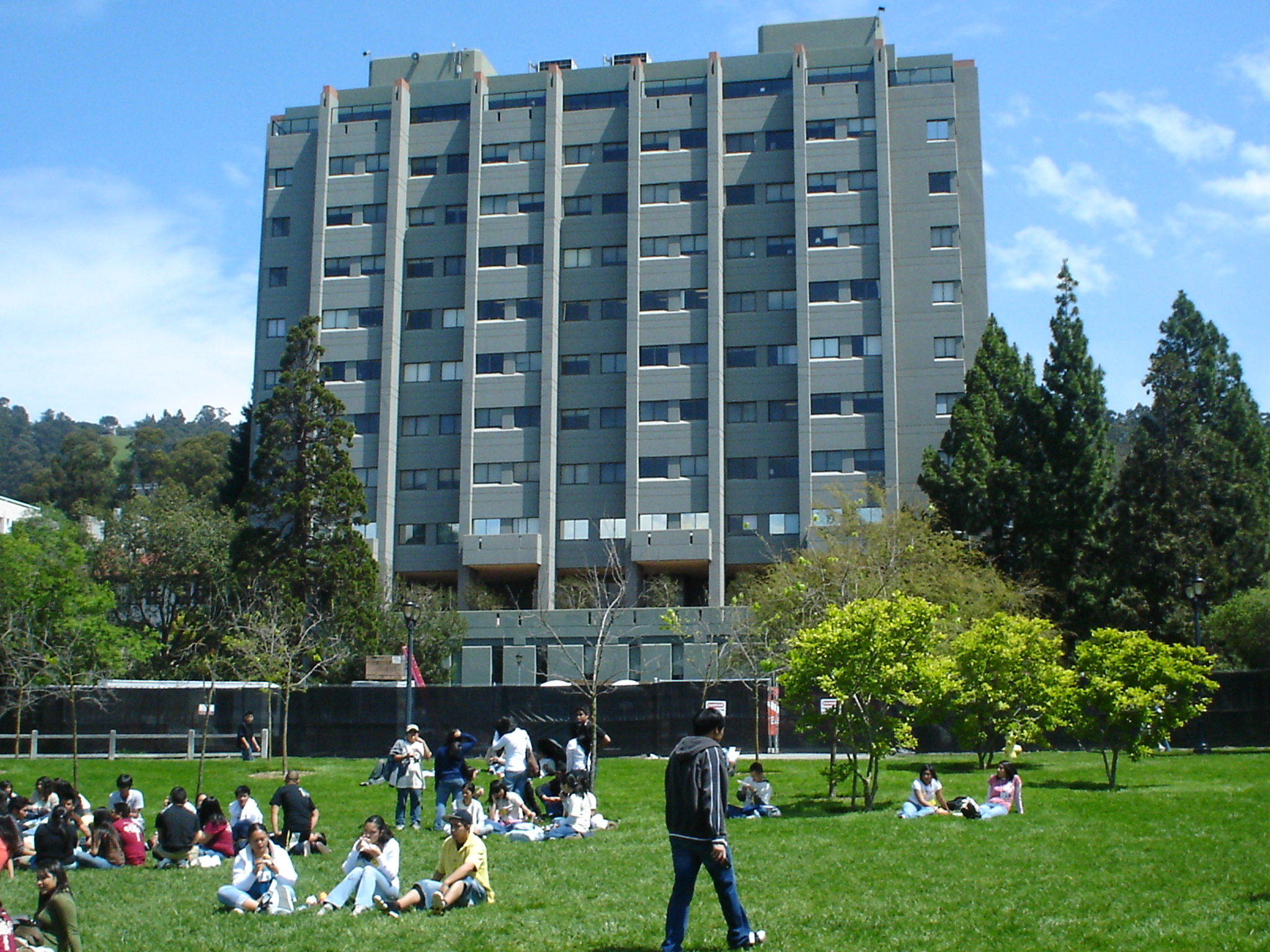
Evans Hall, Campus of the University of California, Berkeley

Gardner Acton Dailey (1895 – 1967) was an American architect, active in the San Francisco Bay Area in the 20th century.

== Life and career ==
Gardner Acton Dailey was born in 1895, in St. Paul, Minnesota. He came to California in 1915 to work for landscape architect Donald McLaren, found assorted design jobs in Costa Rica and elsewhere in Central America, then served in the Aviation Section, U.S. Signal Corps as a Lieutenant and pilot in World War I. His aircraft was hit on a reconnaissance mission in France, and he permanently lost sight in his right eye.

Between 1919 and 1926 Dailey educated himself at the University of California, Berkeley, at Stanford University, at Heald's Engineering College, and during a year in Europe to study architecture.

Gardner opened his own office in 1926, concentrating at first on houses, and collaborating frequently with landscape architect Thomas Church. (Four of Dailey's northern California houses were featured in the May 1941 Architectural Forum. Three of them were designed with Church.)

After beginning his career in revival styles, Gardner adopted modernism in 1935, making him one of two figures who "introduced modern architecture to Northern California," the other being William Wurster.

Dailey was also an inventor with two wartime patents: a demountable roof in 1941, and a shower stall with sliding screen, for the Bay Area's Rheem Manufacturing Company, in 1944. In 1948 Dailey was made a Fellow of the American Institute of Architects. Dailey was associated with the San Francisco Planning Commission and the San Francisco Museum of Modern Art. In 1950 the Art Commission of San Francisco presented him with an Award of Honor for Distinguished Work in Architecture.

In 1952 Dailey was described as "the fine elder statesman of San Francisco architecture" who "has graduated from his office many a young architect," including Joseph Esherick. Charles Porter and Robert Steinwedell also worked in Dailey's office before leaving to form their own firm in 1953. In 1960 Dailey was awarded the Philippine Legion of Honor for his work in Manila.

Dailey married Lucille Downey of San Francisco, his longtime secretary, in 1961.

After being in ill health for months, in October 1967 Dailey committed suicide by jumping from the Golden Gate Bridge.

== Work ==
Gardner's architectural designs include:

- Spanish Colonial Revival renovation of 1885 barns, Allied Arts Guild, Menlo Park, with Pedro Joseph de Lemos, 1927
- addition to the historic Haas–Lilienthal House, San Francisco, 1928
- Brazil Pavilion, Golden Gate International Exposition (razed), with murals by Robert Boardman Howard, 1939
- Owens Residence, Sausalito, 1939
- Merchant Marine Cadet Basic Training School, now part of the Coyote Point Recreation Area, San Mateo, California, 1942
- American National Red Cross Headquarters, San Francisco, 1946 (razed 2001)
- Hertz Hall, 1958; Tolman Hall, 1963; also Evans, Morrison, and Kroeber Halls, all at Campus of the University of California, Berkeley
- Voorhies Hall, 1959; master plan, 1960; Olson Hall, 1963; Sproul Hall, 1963; Fine Arts Hall 1966; Administration Building, 1966; 12-unit Pierce-Thiell residence hall complex, 1967; and School of Law Building, 1968, all for University of California, Davis
- Manila American Cemetery of the American Battle Monuments Commission, with a bas-relief by Lithuanian-American sculptor Boris Lovet-Letski, 1960
- Brundage Collection of Oriental Art, M.H. de Young Memorial Museum, 1965
- Physics Lecture Hall, Stanford University, 1965
- KRON-TV building, 1001 Van Ness, San Francisco, 1967
- art studio, Marin Art and Garden Center, Ross, California
- Ets-Hokin House, Ross, California
- Bay Area Rapid Transit central headquarters building, Oakland
