= La Ribera Hotel =

Historic building in California, U.S.

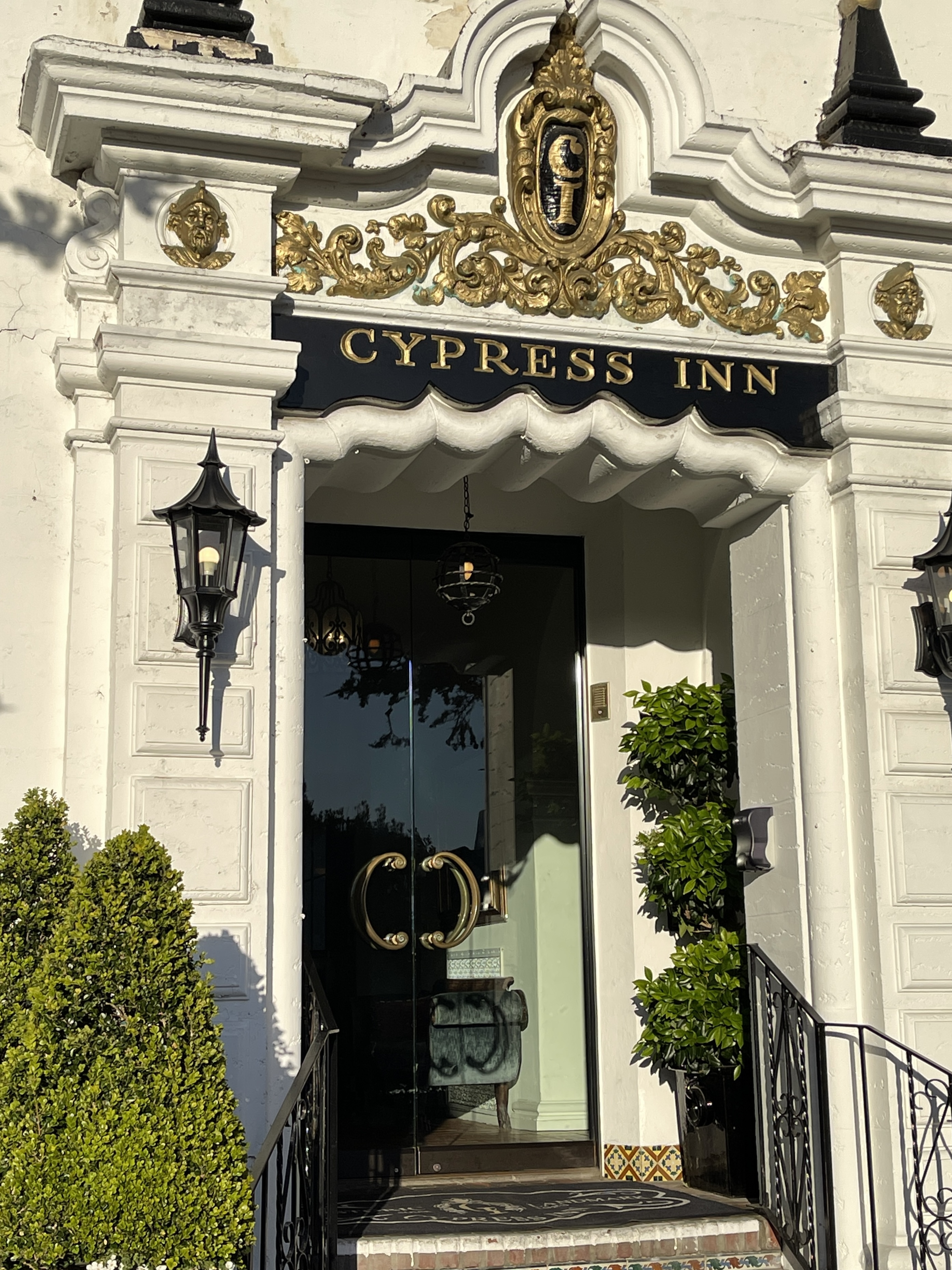
- La Ribera Hotel, also known as Cypress Inn

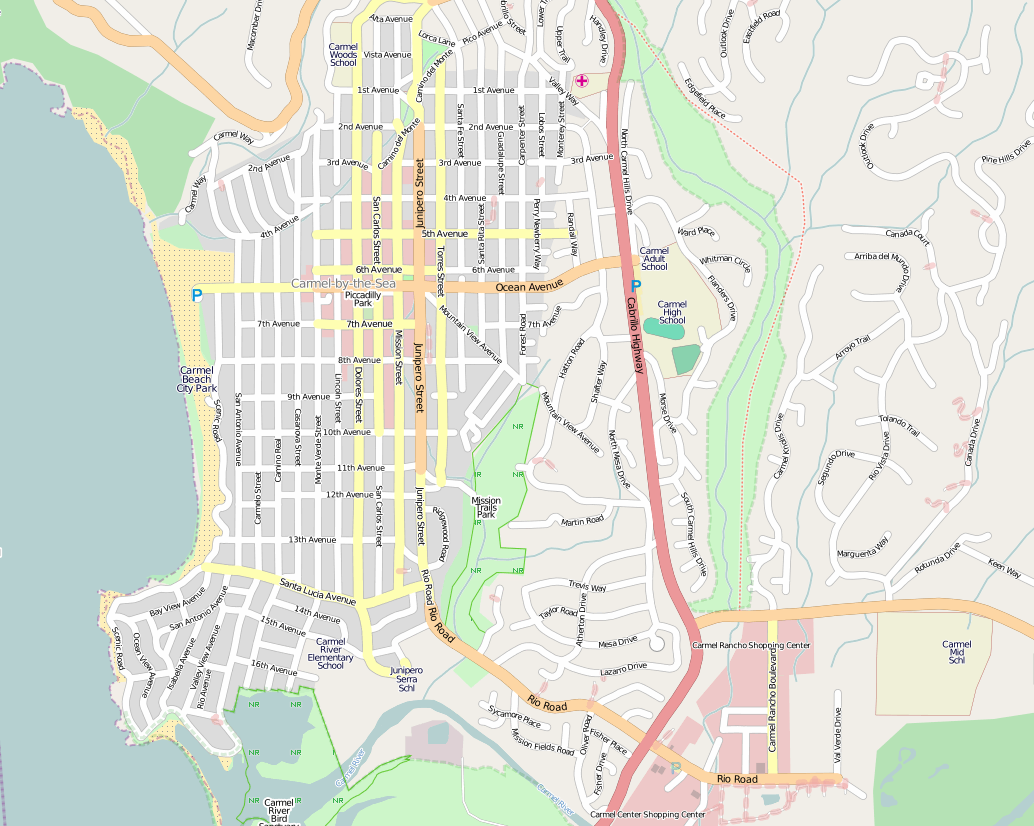
- Location in the Monterey Peninsula
- 36°33′14″N 121°55′22″W
- Location: Lincoln St. & 7th Ave., Carmel-by-the-Sea, California

History
- Built: 1929
- Built by: Meese & Briggs (1929; Harold Geyer (1949)
- Built for: Dr. Rudoph Kocher
- Original use: Hotel

Site notes
- Architect(s): Blaine & Olsen (1929); Gardner Dailey (1949)
- Architectural style: Spanish Eclectic
- Current use: Inn

The La Ribera Hotel, also known as the Cypress Inn, is a historic Spanish Eclectic hotel in Carmel-by-the-Sea, California. It was designed by architects Blaine & Olsen of Oakland, California and built in 1929, by Meese & Briggs. The building was designated as a significant commercial building in the city's Downtown Historic District Property Survey, and was recorded with the Department of Parks and Recreation on February 13, 2003.

== History ==
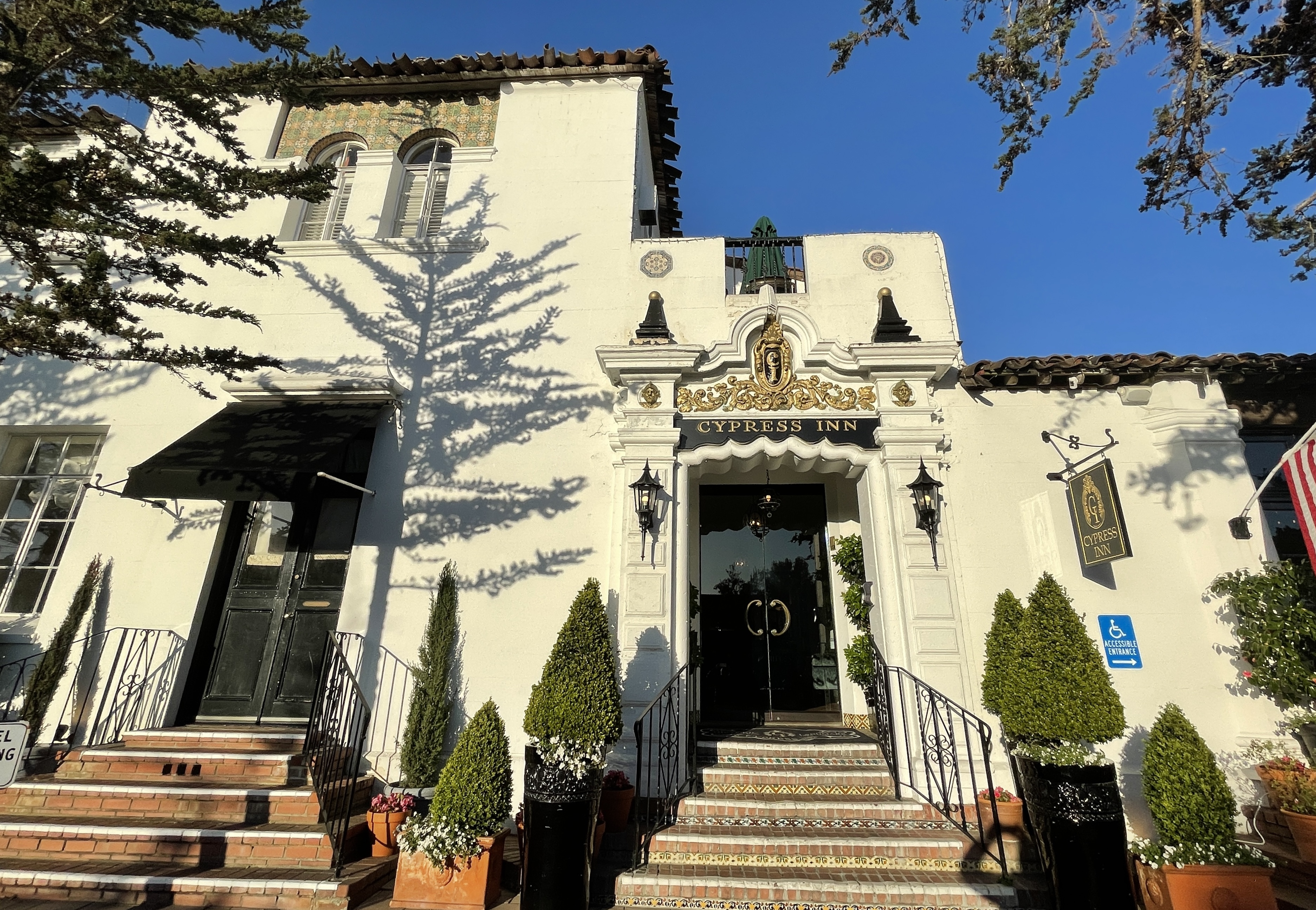
The Cypress Inn front entrances.

La Ribera Hotel has its origins in a home; watercolorist Sydney J. Yard designed and built his house on Lincoln Street and 7th Avenue in 1906. He later added an art studio, where he had regular showings.

The current building is a two-story reinforced concrete and wood frame Spanish Eclectic style hotel. It is located on Lincoln Street & 7th Avenue. La Ribera means "The Riverbank " in Spanish. A tall stepped Moorish style tower is centered in the hotel with paired, keyhole arched opening on each elevation. A one-story hypen connects the main building with a two-story addition. A grass patio separates the two wings, enclosed by a wrought iron fence along 7th Avenue. It qualified for inclusion in the Downtown Historic District Property Survey because it is an example of the Spanish Eclectic commercial designed by the architects Blaine & Olsen of Oakland, California, and the 1949 two-story addition by San Francisco architect Gardner Dailey.

The hotel was built two years after Blaine & Olsen completed the Kocher Building (1927), and one year after El Paseo Building (1928). The building was designed to complement the Kocher and El Paseo buildings in the Spanish Eclectic style. Dr. Rudoph Kocher found funding for the project through his associate, Grace Deere Velie (of the John Deere Family). Mrs. John S. Ball, who operated the Lincoln Inn, on the former site prior to construction, continued as manager of the La Ribera.

During the Great Depression in the United States, the hotel went into receivership in 1930. It was reopened and managed as the La Ribera by A. G. Wood, a former manager of Monterey's San Carlos Hotel. In 1949, a two-story addition was made.

La Ribera kept its original name until the 1960s when new management renamed it the Cypress West hotel. In the mid-1980s, businessman Denny LeVett and actress Doris Day restored the hotel and reopened it as the Cypress Inn. It was an early pet–friendly hotel and was featured on March 15, 1999, in the Architectural Digest.

== See also ==
- List of hotels in the United States
