= Allied Arts Guild =

Coordinates: 37.441527°N 122.179040°W

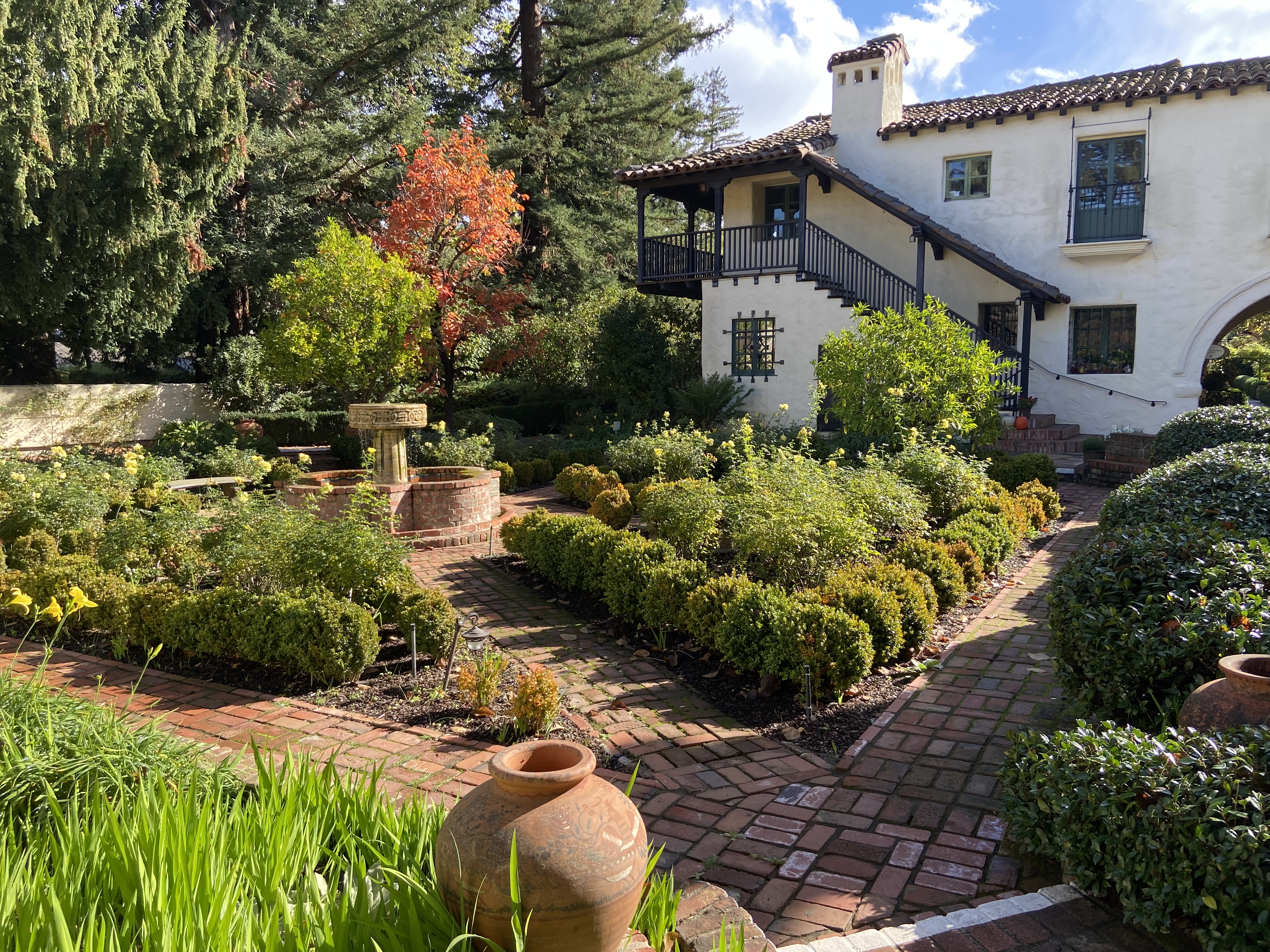
- Allied Arts Guild (2025)
- Nickname: Allied Arts
- Formation: 1928
- Founder: Garfield D. Merner
- Founded at: Menlo Park, California
- Purpose: Art studios, shops, restaurant, gardens
- Headquarters: Menlo Park, California, United States
- Website: alliedartsguild.org

Allied Arts Guild was founded in 1928 and is a complex of artist studios, shops, restaurant, and gardens in Menlo Park, California, and is used as a venue for both public and private events. It is run by the Allied Arts Guild Auxiliary to provide funds for uncompensated care and special projects at the Lucile Packard Children's Hospital.

== History ==
In 1928, wealthy art lovers Delight and Garfield D. Merner of Hillsborough bought 3.5 acres (14,000 m^{2}) of land at the edge of Menlo Park to create a center for craft production, having been inspired by craft guilds they had seen in Europe. They worked closely with architect Gardner Dailey and artist Pedro Joseph de Lemos to design a Spanish Colonial Revival-style complex, re-using some of the old farm buildings on the property. The Merners’ goals were "to provide a workplace for artists; to encourage the crafting of handsome objects for everyday use; and to support all peasant or folk art, especially that of early California."

Ansel Adams was the Guild's photographer of record and took the first interior and exterior photographs shortly after the buildings were completed.

Some of the tiles and objects of art used to decorate the walls were brought from Spain, Tunis and Morocco. Additional tiles, mosaics and frescoes were executed by the de Lemos family and Maxine Albro. The logo was designed by Pedro [de] Lemos, who served as the Guild's first president from 1930 to 1932, then as vice president in 1932–33.

In 1932, the Merners' interest in the Stanford Home for Convalescent Children (now Lucile Packard Children's Hospital) prompted them to invite its Palo Alto Auxiliary to provide lunch service at Allied Arts Guild for the benefit of the Home. The Merners retired from active operation of Allied Arts Guild in 1935 and leased the complex to the Home's Senior Auxiliary. The Allied Arts Guild Auxiliary now operates the complex in support of the Lucile Packard Children's Hospital at Stanford. The Guild premises were renovated in 2004 at a cost of $8.5 million to meet current earthquake standards and to repair structural problems. Replacements for broken roof tiles were produced by hand to match the original tiles.

== Garfield D. Merner ==
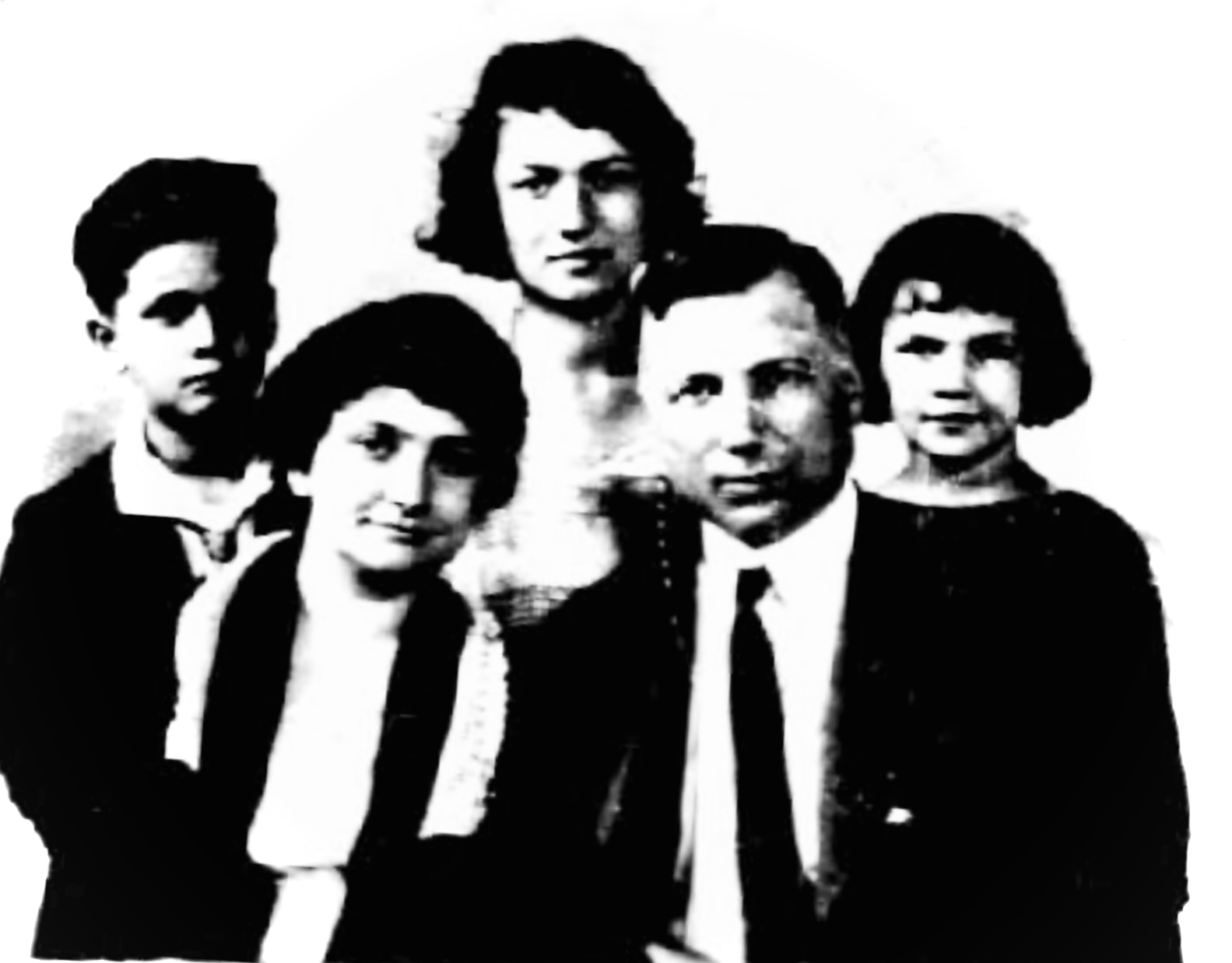
The Garfield D. Merner family (1921)

Garfield David Merner was a businessman, art patron, world traveler, and philanthropist. He was born on January 31, 1883, in Cedar Falls, Iowa. He is the son of David C. Merner (1855–1923) and Emma Pfeiffer (1860–1945). He married Benetta Delight Ward (1885–1958) on August 23, 1905, in Allison, Iowa, and had two sons and two daughters. He lived in St. Louis, Missouri in 1910.

In 1924, he built a one-and-one-half-story Tudor Revival-style house on Carmelo Street and 7th Avenue in Carmel-by-the-Sea, California, in what is now called the Garfield D. Merner House, or known simply as "Hob Nob."

When his first wife died in 1958, he married Ruth Conklin on September 21, 1959, in Marin County, California. He was past president of Pfeiffer Medical Research Foundation of New York City.

He died on February 27, 1972, in San Francisco, California, at the age of 89.

== See also ==
- Pacific Art League in Palo Alto, California
