= Alfred Edgar Burton =

American professor of civil engineering

Alfred Edgar Burton (March 25, 1857 in Portland, Maine – 1935) was an American professor of civil engineering, and the first Dean of the Faculty of the Massachusetts Institute of Technology (MIT) from 1902 until 1922.

Burton graduated from Bowdoin College in 1881. He later accompanied his college roommate, Robert E. Peary, on his early expeditions to Greenland and the Arctic. He joined the staff of MIT the following year, and served as an assistant professor of topographical engineering, and then as associate professor after his promotion in 1889. He was appointed Dean of the Faculty in 1902, and served until 1922.

Burton was the Supervisor of the Naval Schools of the United States Shipping Board during World War I.

He was an early member of the National Geographic Society, and was elected as Fellow of the American Academy of Arts and Sciences in 1902.

In 1884, Burton married Anna Gertrude Hitz, with whom he had two sons, including future Supreme Court justice Harold H. Burton. Gertrude died young in 1906. That same year, Burton married the artist, writer, and poet Jeanne D'Orge, then known as Lena Yates. Together they had three children, including Virginia Lee Burton. The couple divorced in 1925 following his retirement, a move to Carmel-by-the-Sea, California, and D'orge moving in with another man, a former student of his named Carl Cherry.
