= Frank Hubbard Powers =

American politician and lawyer (1864–1920)

Frank Powers
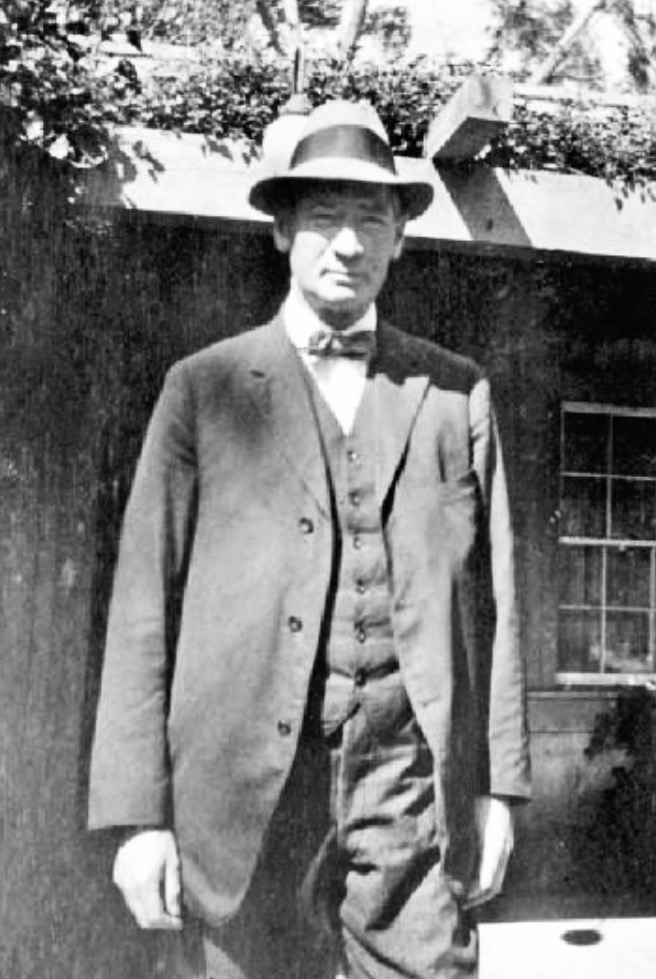
- Frank H. Powers, ca. 1910.

26th

Member of the California State Assembly from the 41st district
- In office January 7, 1895 - January 4, 1897
- Preceded by: John M. Curtis
- Succeeded by: Henry C. Dibble

Personal details
- Born: Frank Hubbard Powers; September 25, 1864 Campo Seco, California, US
- Died: November 15, 1920 (aged 56) San Francisco, California, US
- Party: Republican (before 1895-1920)
- Spouse: Jane Maria Gallatin
- Children: 4
- Profession: Attorney; politician

Frank Hubbard Powers (September 25, 1864 – November 15, 1920), served in the California State Assembly for the 41st district from 1895 to 1897.

== Early life ==
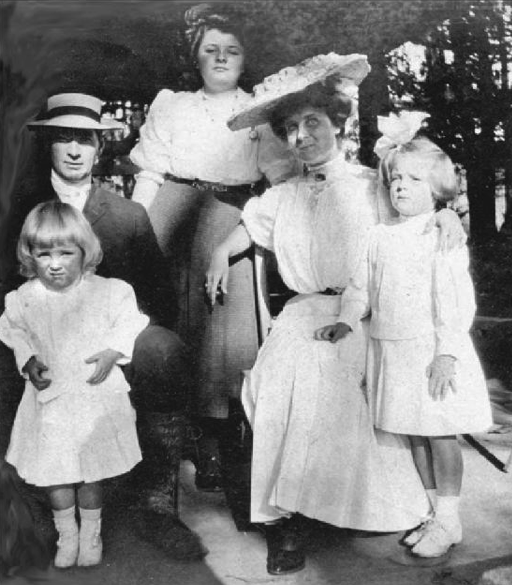
Frank Powers and family (1905).

Powers was born in Campo Seco, Calaveras County, California, on September 25, 1864. He was the son of Aaron Huubard Powers (1829-1907) and Emma Louisa Sweasey (1883-1902), pioneers of the 1849 gold rush. He was educated at the public schools in Sacramento, California and the University of California, Berkeley.

On May 29, 1884, at the University of California, Berkeley, Colonel, Frank H. Powers was in the National Guard of California (N.G.C.) military commission as a member of the graduating class.

On October 15, 1891, Powers married Jane Maria Gallatin (1869-1944) in Manhattan, New York City. She was the daughter of a Sacramento financier, Albert Gallatin (1835-1905). The Victorian house where she grew up in Sacramento was later owned by the father of journalist Lincoln Steffens, and it became the California Governor's Mansion in 1903.

They were at the Thorndike Hotel in Boston, Massachusetts before they returned to San Francisco by way of Cuba and the Southern Pacific railroad. He was brother-in-law of novelist and explorer Ernest Thompson Seton.

In 1891, Powers was the author of the novel I Swear, a story of a Stockton, California girl in Boston, published by "Vires Publishing Company."

== Professional background ==
=== Attorney ===
While he was a law student he held the rank of Colonel in the N.G.C through his commission as a student of the University of California. In 1886, he was admitted to the bar in Sacramento. After practicing law in Sacramento and Stockton, California for several years he went to San Francisco and formed a law partnership with J. H. Young called Young & Powers. He then went into the law firm of Heller & Powers in 1896. When Sidney M. Ehrman, joined the firm in 1905, the firm changed to Heller Powers & Ehrman.

=== Politician ===
Powers was a member of the California State Assembly for the 41st district from January 7, 1895, to January 4, 1897. He ran on the Republican ticket and was a Republican for most of his life. He was nominated by Republicans who wanted to secure the adoption of some needed amendments to the Mechanic's lien law.

=== Carmel Development Company ===
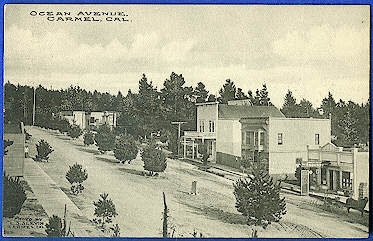
Carmel's Ocean Avenue (1908).

Powers was interested in the preservation of the California missions and made efforts to the conservation of the Carmel Mission by representing the US government at the centenary celebration of Padre Junípero Serra on the Island of Mallorca, Spain in 1913. In April 1903, Powers wrote a letter to the editor of the San Francisco Examiner saying that he, along with William Randolph Hearst, was willing to contribute to the Fund for the Preservation of California's Landmarks. He said: "I think that all the old missions and other buildings should be restored and preserved as monuments to the founders. I am ready to furnish the adobe and the tiling for restoration of that mission in proper form, and for $3,000 (equivalent to $107,500 in 2025), I believe that all the adobe and all the tiling for the mission buildings coul be furnished. I am going to do my little towards preserving a relic of early days in this State by preserving an old style farm house in Monterey."

=== Murphey's barn/studio ===
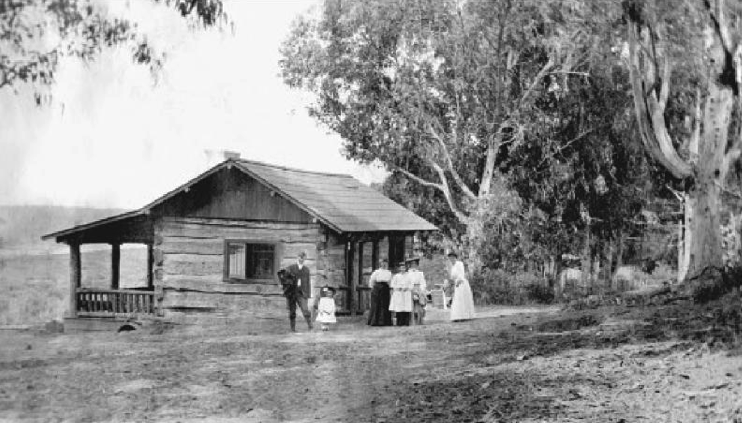
Murphey farmhouse, Carmle's first art studio

Powers was a member of the Zeta Psi fraternity, the San Francisco Bohemian Club, University Club, Commonwealth Club of California, the Society of California, and the Masonic fraternity.

== Death ==
Powers died on November 15, 1920, at the age of 56, at his home in San Francisco. He was still a member of the Heller & Powers at the time of his death. Funeral service were held in N. Gray and Company funeral home. Cremation was at the Cypress Lawn Memorial Park in Colma, California.

== See also ==
- California's 41st State Assembly district
- List of Bohemian Club members
