= Outlands in the Eighty Acres =

Historic building in California

- U.S. National Register of Historic Places
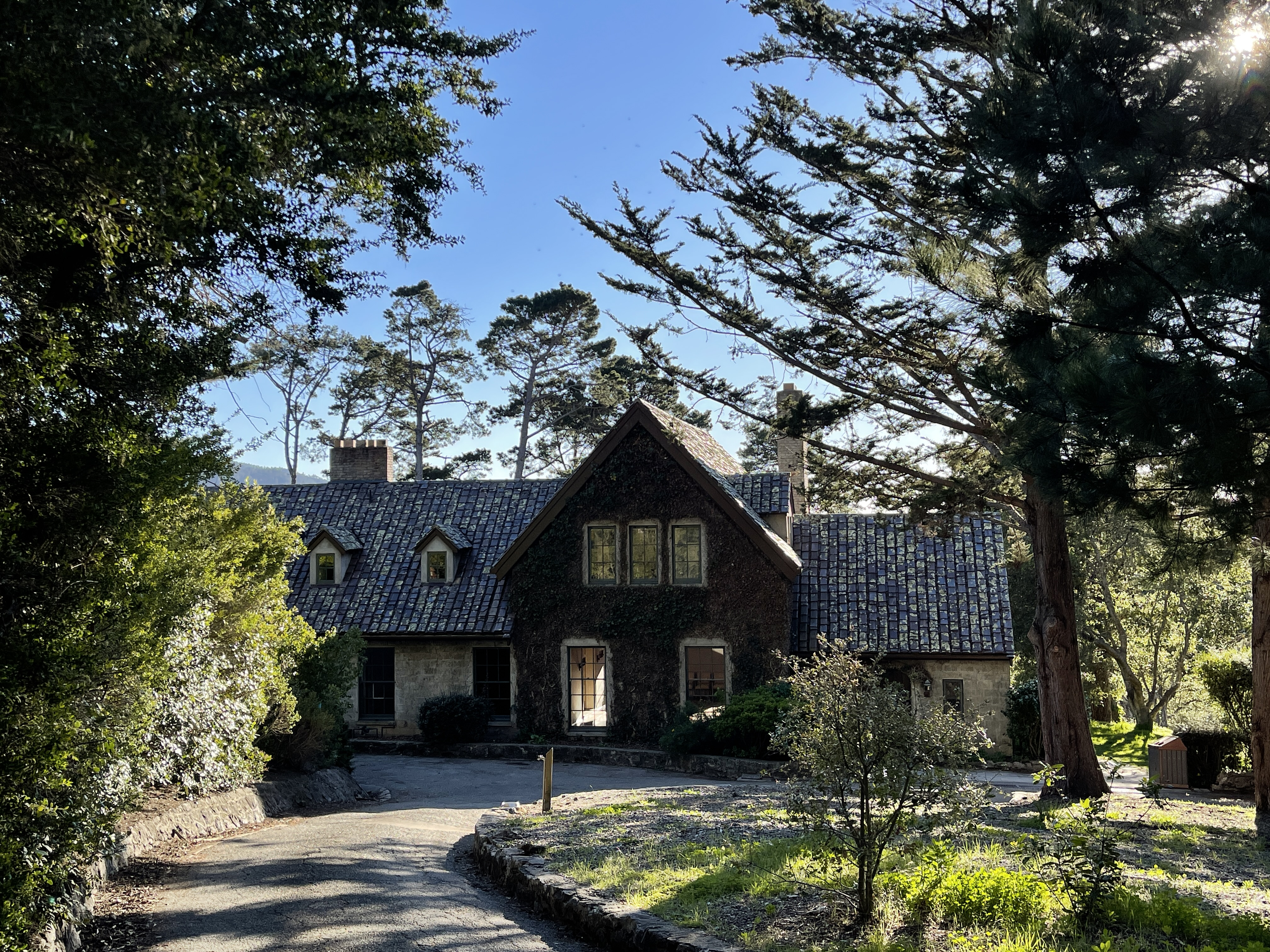
- Flanders Mansion, Carmel-by-the-Sea, California

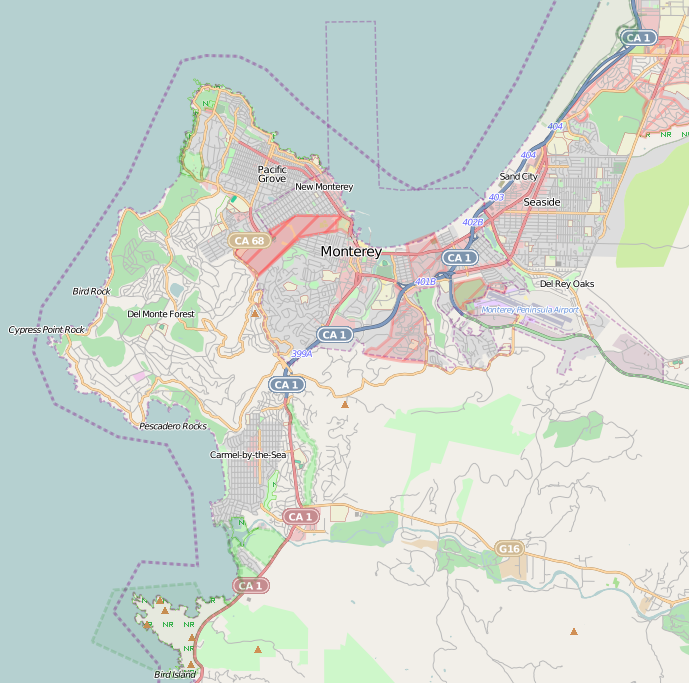
- Location within Monterey Peninsula
- Location: 25800 Hatton Rd., Carmel-by-the-Sea, California
- Coordinates: 36°32′54″N 121°55′0″W
- Built: 1924/1925
- Built by: Fred Ruhl
- Architect: Henry Higby Gutterson
- Architectural style: Tudor Revival architecture
- NRHP reference No.: 89000228
- Added to NRHP: March 23, 1989

Outlands in the Eighty Acres, also known as Flanders Mansion is an 8,000-square-foot Tudor Revival house. It is significant as a work of architect Henry Higby Gutterson, and for its innovative construction with light grey interlocking Precast concrete blocks. It is one of the earliest architect designed residences in Carmel-by-the-Sea, and the only known example of work by Gutterson in the region. It is located within the Mission Trail Nature Preserve in Carmel-by-the-Sea, California. It was listed on the National Register of Historic Places on March 23, 1989.

== History ==
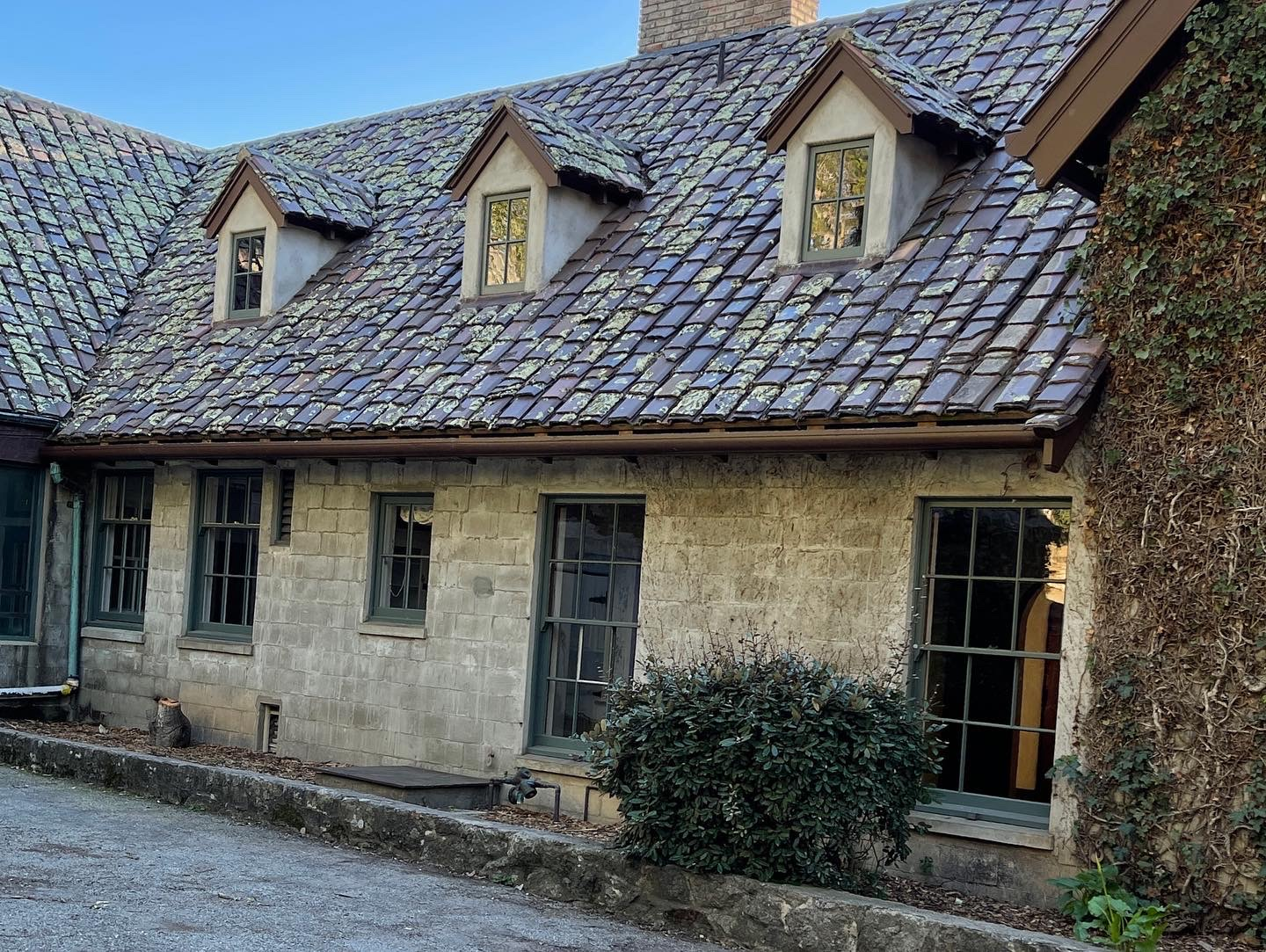
Front of the Flanders Mansion

Paul and Grace Flanders, married in 1920, came to Carmel in 1922, to build a home and start a business in real estate development. They purchased 80 acres of land from Dr. Daniel T. MacDougal. Flanders designed a two-story home, which they named the Outlands at 25800 Hatton Road, located on a hill overlooking the Carmel Mission, and Point Lobos.

The Flander's were one of the first Carmelites to hire an outside architect, Henry Higby Gutterson, to design and contractor Fred Ruhl to build their residence. The home lies at the end of a driveway off Hatton Road surrounded by upper end of the Mission Trail Nature Preserve. The "Outlands" English cottage design was one of the first use of this style of residential architecture in Carmel By-the-Sea. The construction with light grey interlocking Precast concrete blocks that were advertised as "fireproof, waterproof and practically everlasting."

In 1972, Mayor Gunnar Norberg mounted the "Save the Flanders Estate' campaign. As vice-mayor, he persuaded the City of Carmel to purchase the Flanders mansion and adjoining 14.9 acres (6.0 ha) from the Flanders heirs for $275,000 (equivalent to $2,116,647 in 2025). It has become part of the 34-acre Mission Trail Nature Preserve.

One of the things former mayor Clint Eastwood was elected on in 1986 was tearing the mansion down because it was not making any money for the city after it was purchased by them in 1971.

The Carmel Art Institute was relocated to the Flanders Mansion, where the Institute continued to operate under John Cunningham.

== Ownership disputes ==
The City of Carmel-by-the-Sea has continuously held the deed and official management authority over the preserve and mansion since purchasing the estate in 1972. Because the mansion required over $1 million in repairs, the City Council repeatedly sought to either lease or sell the house to a private buyer to offload the maintenance liability. Local preservationists (led for many years by former mayor Charlotte Townsend and resident Melanie Billig) formed the non-profit Flanders Foundation in 1998 specifically to oppose privatization and raise grant funding so a non-profit could restore and manage the mansion for public use. Rather than partnering with the Flanders Foundation to manage the site, the City of Carmel pushed forward with plans to sell the mansion. In response, the Flanders Foundation sued the city multiple times beginning in 2005 (Flanders Foundation v. City of Carmel-by-the-Sea), winning a California Court of Appeal decision in 2012 on environmental and historic preservation grounds (CEQA) that blocked the sale. Because the Flanders Foundation was locked in litigation with City Hall, the City Council later recognized a separate volunteer organization called the Friends of Mission Trail Nature Preserve (formally designated as an official City Support Group by City Council Resolution 2012-70 in October 2012) to assist the Public Works Department with hands-on trail maintenance and habitat restoration.

== See also ==
- National Register of Historic Places listings in Monterey County, California
