= SchoolArts =

Educational magazine

SchoolArts Magazine
- May–June 2013 cover
- Editor-in-Chief: Frank Juarez
- Editor: Bret Laurie
- Art Director: Julia Wade
- Former editors: Nancy Walkup
- Categories: Pedagogy; Art Education; Visual Art; Art Advocacy; Contemporary Art
- Frequency: 9 Issues/Year
- Publisher: Julian Wade
- Founder: Henry Turner Bailey
- Founded: 1901
- First issue: September 1, 1901
- Company: Davis Publications, Inc.
- Country: United States
- Based in: Worcester, MA
- Language: English
- Website: schoolartsmagazine.com

SchoolArts is a magazine written by and for K–12 art educators. It is produced by Davis Publications, a family-owned publisher of pre-K–12 art curriculum. The publisher and president, Julian Davis Wade, is a fifth-generation member of the Davis family, who has published the magazine continuously since its origin in 1901. Julian is the great-great-grandson of Gilbert G. Davis, the founder of the magazine, along with three prominent art educators from Massachusetts in the early 1900s.

== History ==
SchoolArts magazine originated in 1901 in Worcester, Massachusetts when Henry Turner Bailey (state agent for the Promotion of Industrial Drawing), Fred Daniels (supervisor of drawing in the city of Worcester), James Hall (supervised drawing in Springfield), and Gilbert Gates Davis (a printer) collaborated to produce The Applied Arts Book, now known as SchoolArts. They believed art teachers needed a periodical to help them develop and use emerging art curricula. They were determined “to promote by every legitimate means the progress of sound art instruction and the development of public taste in all matters relating to the applied arts.

SchoolArts articles have been used for movements such as Picture Study, the Arts and Crafts movement, and multiculturalism. Contributing writers have included Arthur Wesley Dow, Viktor Lowenfeld and John Dewey. As SchoolArts grew, the publication moved to developing books. In 1958, Davis Publications was incorporated as a separate company that continued to publish SchoolArts.

== Currently ==
Today SchoolArts publishes nine issues a year and is available in both print and digital formats. It has a print circulation of 7,000 and 30,000 digital subscribers.

SchoolArts is located in the Printer’s Building, built by the Davis family in 1923. The current editor (2024-present), Frank Juarez, brings over two decades of art education and arts management experience organizing local and regional art exhibitions, and community art events to SchoolArts magazine. He presents on art education at the state and national level, supports artists through grant programs, and offers professional development workshops for artists. Juárez’s projects include Artdose Magazine, 365 Artists 365 Days Project, Midwest Artist Studios Project, and the Indiana Green Invitational.

SchoolArts works cooperatively with the National Art Education Association to promote the value of education of the visual arts.

== Content ==
SchoolArts magazine issues run throughout the year beginning with an August issue to begin the traditional school year and a Summer issue to end it.

Every thematic issue offers studio lessons for early childhood, elementary, middle, and high school. Articles are submitted by art educators and focus on trends in art education, art advocacy, and classroom resources. In addition to lessons and articles the magazine produces features focusing on art history, contemporary artists, careers in art, and support for teachers in addressing the needs of all learners, including students with special needs and English language learners.
