= Gunnar Norberg =

American politician and businessman

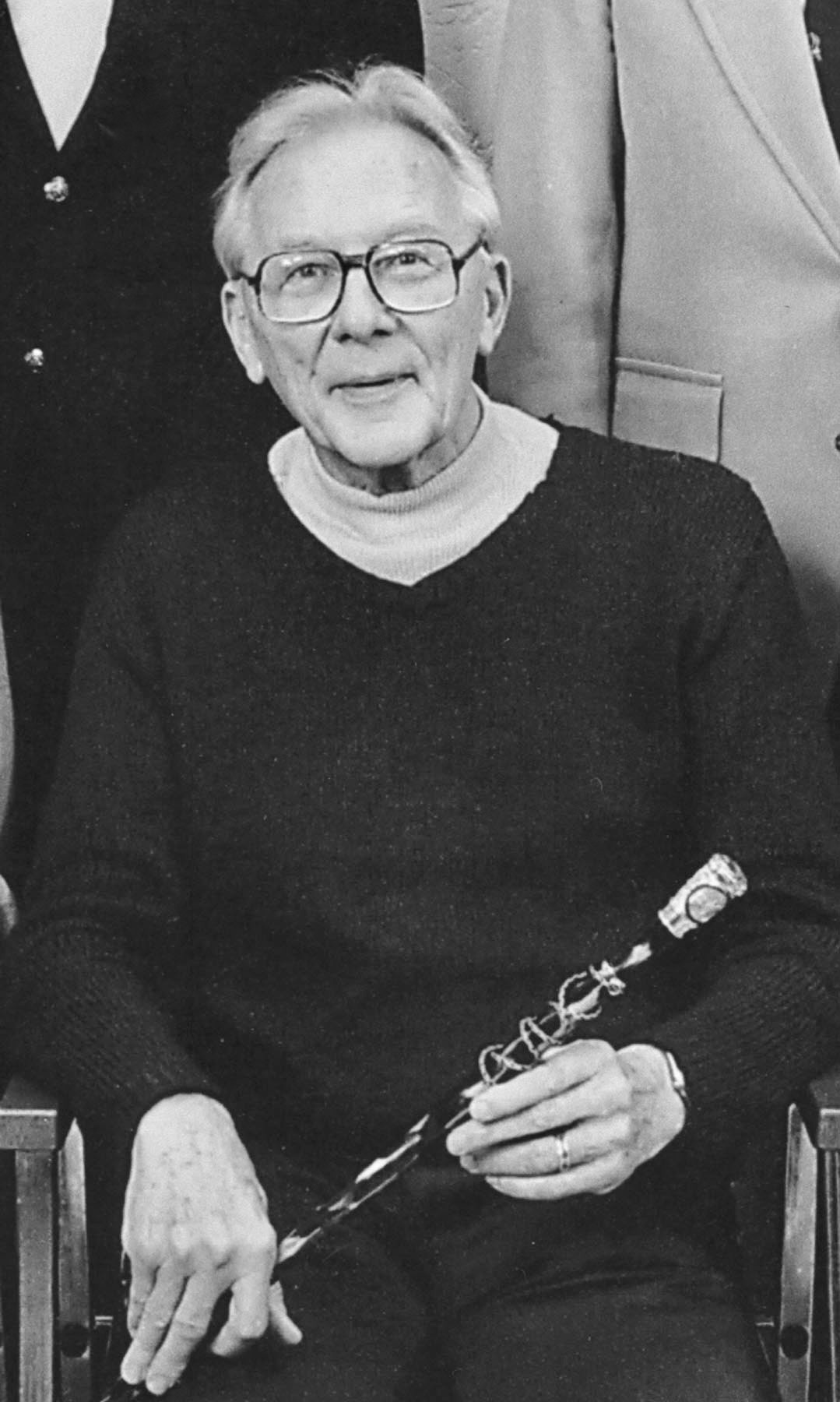
- Norberg ca. 1978

27th Mayor of Carmel-by-the-Sea
- In office 1976–1980
- Preceded by: Eugene Hammond
- Succeeded by: Barney Laiolo

Personal details
- Born: Nils Gunnar Norberg; February 4, 1907 Kenora, Ontario, Canada
- Died: September 17, 1988 (aged 81) Carmel-by-the-Sea, California, US
- Party: Republican
- Occupation: Businessman politician
- Known for: Mayor of Carmel-by-the-Sea, California

Gunnar Norberg, (February 4, 1907–August 17, 1988) was an American businessman and politician. He served two terms as a city councilman and two terms as mayor of Carmel-by-the-Sea, California.

== Early life ==
Norberg was born on February 4, 1907, in Kenora, located on the shore of the Lake of the Woods, Ontario, Canada. His parents, Albert Norberg and Thilda Osterberg, were both Swedish. He moved with his family to Little Falls, Minnesota, as a child.

During intermittent periods of study at Stanford University he learned bookkeeping and accounting, applying his knowledge in these fields while working for the Southern Pacific Railroad. He also separately launched a journalism career in New York as a Hearst newspaper columnist and magazine editor for Fawcett Publications. There he met Barbara Drew Collins, an actress and member of the Barrymore family. They married on March 28, 1936, in Manhattan, New York City. Following the death of Barbara in the summer of 1972, Norberg married Wies Christianson (1933–2017) in June 1973, at the Outlands in the Eighty Acres Flanders Mansion in Carmel-by-the-Sea. They were married in costumes inspired by the Shakespearean play Twelfth Night.

== Career ==
In 1940, Gunnar and Barbara visited Carmel-by-the-Sea, California while on vacation and decided to make it their permanent home. The couple received a home in the town, at the southeast corner of Carmelo Street and 10th Avenue, as a wedding gift for from the bride's parents. The house had been built in 1909 in the American Craftsman architectural style.

During the summer of 1941, Norberg opened a travel agency, which he operated until his retirement in 1979. He also started an accounting service in Carmel during the war years.

Following Japan's attack on Pearl Harbor, Norberg was drafted by the United States Army during World War II, serving from 1943 to 1945. He avoided assignment to a combat unit due to his poor eyesight. He became a U.S. citizen upon enlistment in the military. He was inducted at the Presidio of Monterey military base, eventually being transferred to Camp Beale. Private Norberg became the editor for the base's newspaper, while playing a role in establishing its first football team and symphony orchestra. He received an honorable discharge to join the Office of Inter-American Affairs, which eventually was merged with the Voice of America.

=== Politics ===
Norberg entered into local politics in Carmel with his election to the city council in 1958. Recalling his political career, the regional newspaper Monterey County Now wrote that town residents admired him for his efforts to safeguard the town's character while disliking his approach to accomplishing this.

Norberg's lost a 1962 re-election bid for the city council, but then won council elections in 1966 and 1970. Norberg served as Carmel-by-the-Sea's vice-mayor from 1972 to 1975. In September 1976, Norberg was elected as Carmel's mayor in a 3-to-2 city council vote, succeeding Eugene Hammond, who had resigned earlier in the month. He was reappointed for a second term as mayor by the city council in 1978.

The Carmel Pine Cone's 1988 obituary for Norberg stated that as mayor he encountered resistance from his peers regarding ideas of his that were considered progressive, such as advocating against increased hotel square footage and proposing a 500-foot distance between similar tourist-oriented shops. Norberg claimed to be a "lone voice in the wilderness crying out and getting little reaction", while some residents in favor of tourist development called him the "Abominable No-Man." Under Norberg's leadership, Carmel filed two lawsuits to protect the city from development in the Carmel Valley that he viewed as unfavorable to the city's interests. He was seen as continuing the political approach set by Carmel-by-the-Sea Mayor Perry Newberry in standing firmly against unrestricted growth and tourism development. Norberg also was opposed to a proposed freeway traversing the nearby Hatton Valley to relieve traffic on the California's coastal Route 101. The local press characterized Norberg as an advocate for preserving the town's natural landscapes.

As vice-mayor, he persuaded the city council to buy the Flanders Mansion and adjoining 14.9 acres (6.0 ha) in 1972 from the Flanders heirs for $275,000, intending to prevent the Flanders Estate from development. In May 1979, the 20th Century Fox film company purchased the Pebble Beach Corporation of the neighboring town for more than $71 million. Norberg expressed concerns about the acquisition, believing that 20th Century Fox would utilize surplus revenue from the success of the movie Star Wars to advance commercialization throughout the Monterey Peninsula region, to the detriment of Carmel-by-the-Sea. The New York Times'coverage of the issue quoted Norberg as saying, "if a big corporation can come in here and unload the money it makes elsewhere and ruin the quality of life for the people who live here, then the big conglomerates can do it anywhere." The city council, in response, passed a resolution opposing the acquisition.

Upon Clint Eastwood's decision not to seek re-election as the mayor of Carmel in 1988, Norberg and former mayor Charlotte Townsend expressed their hopes for a return to a simpler, more ordinary way of life, with diminished commercialization in the city. Norberg emphasized his belief that Carmel had experienced a surge in commercialization during the previous two years, asserting that the essence of "Carmel wasn't made by spending money. It was made by spending the time and effort of dedicated people."

=== Acting and activism ===
Norberg and his wife both acted in plays at Edward Kuster's Golden Bough Playhouse. In 1971, Norberg and president of the Forest Theater Guild, photographer Cole Weston, played a role in a campaign to preserve the Forest Theater, an outdoor venue. Arguing that the theater held great cultural significance and historical value, they rallied the community behind an effort to secure its survival.

In 1972, to raise funds for the Theater's preservation, Norberg and Weston produced a full production of William Shakespeare's Twelfth Night. The production was seen as successful and leveraged by Norberg to demonstrate that there was public interest and support for the Forest Theater among city residents. The city council commissioned a study to evaluate the efficacy of the theater. After several months of public comment and city council discussions, it was decided that the city council would continue to operate the facility and the outdoor theater would be leased to the Forest Theater Guild for a two-year trial. The trial was considered a success, prompting the Guild's lease to be renewed.

== Death ==
Norberg died on August 17, 1988, at age 81, at the Community Hospital of the Monterey Peninsula (CHOMP) of natural causes. Funeral services were at the Forest Theater on August 27.

As mayor, Norberg had planned to launch of the Festival of Firsts, a playwriting competition that he intended to be a prime annual cultural event for the town. In September 1989, a year after his passing, the inaugural festival was held at the town's Sunset Center performance arts venue. The play Portrait of a Dream, written by Californian True Boardman, was selected as the winner from among 141 nationwide entries.

Norberg died shortly after completing a memoir of his experiences in the army, which he titled The Private Norberg Story, Me and the General World War II at the Homefront. His wife and son had the manuscript published in March 2008.
