= Jason and the Argonauts =

Jason and the Argonauts are characters from Greek mythology. This title may also refer to:

- Jason and the Argonauts (film), a 1963 film directed by Don Chaffey with animation by Ray Harryhausen
- Jason and the Argonauts (miniseries), a two-part TV movie made in 2000
- "Jason and the Argonauts", a song by British pop group XTC on the 1982 album English Settlement
- Jason and the Argonauts, a 1913 play by Bertha Newberry
