= Herbert Heron =

American actor and writer (1883–1968)

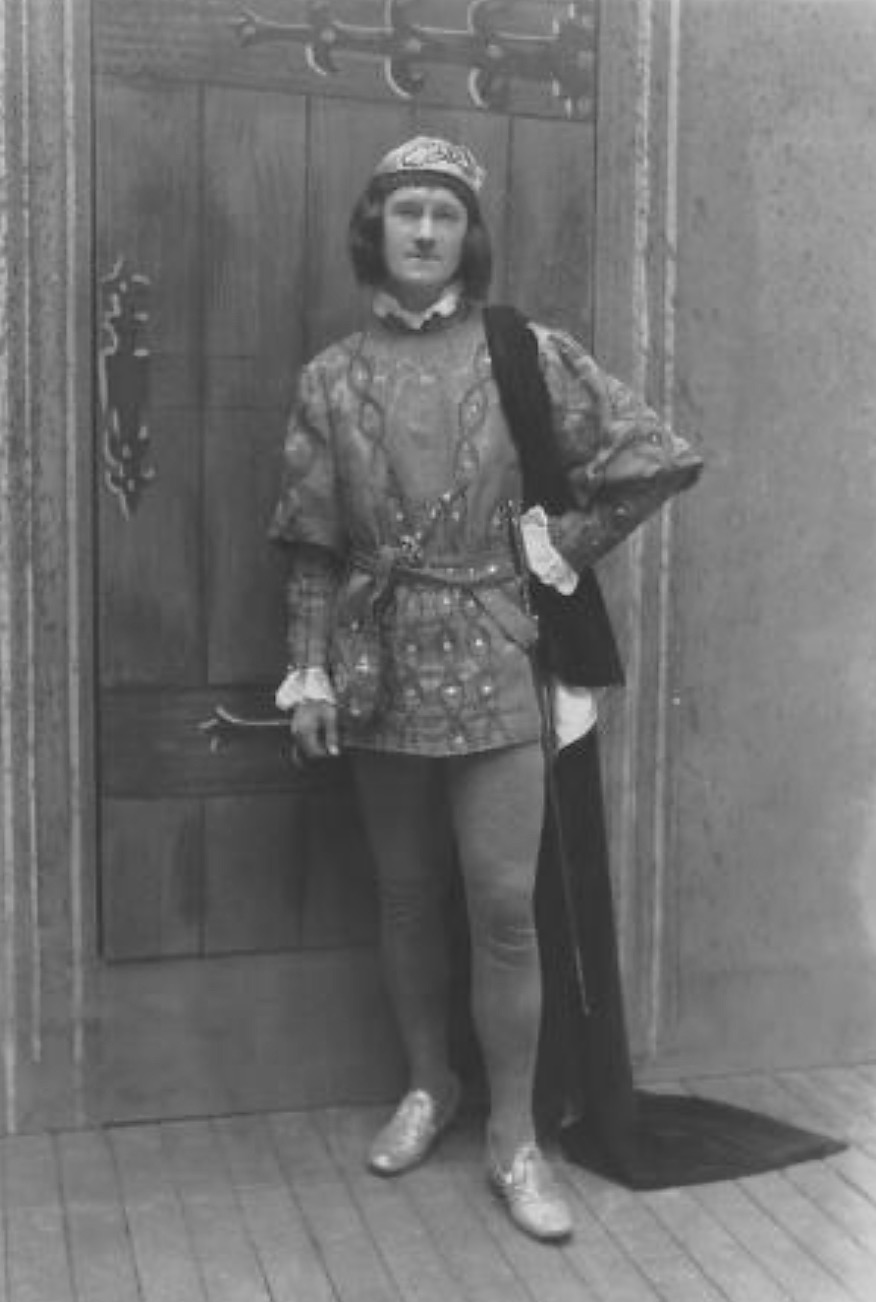
- Heron in Romeo and Juliet at Forest Theater

9th and 13th Mayor of Carmel-by-the-Sea
- In office 1930–1932
- Preceded by: Ross E. Bonham
- Succeeded by: John C. Catlin
- In office 1938–1940
- Preceded by: Everett Smith
- Succeeded by: Keith Evans

Personal details
- Born: Herbert Heron Peet; October 26, 1883 Englewood, New Jersey, US
- Died: January 7, 1968 (aged 84) Carmel-by-the-Sea, California, US
- Spouses: Sara Opal Search (m. 1905, divorced) Mary Helena Conger (m. 1924)
- Occupation: Writer, actor, mayor

Herbert "Bert" Heron (born Herbert Heron Peet; October 26, 1883 – January 7, 1968) was an American writer, actor, producer and mayor. Heron is best known for founding the Forest Theater in 1910. He was the mayor of Carmel-by-the-Sea, California, for two terms in the 1930s. He lived in Carmel for 62 years.

== Early life ==
Heron was born on September 9, 1868, in Englewood, New Jersey. His parents were Gilead Smith Peet (1847–1885) and Jeannie Spring (1843–1921). He came from a family of writers and dramatists. On July 17, 1911, he changed his name to Herbert Heron in Superior Court because he wrote and was known under that name.

He grew up in Los Angeles, California, graduated from Harvard Military School in 1901 and attended Stanford University, but left to go on the stage. He joined the Belasco Stock Company, the Crawley-Meatayer Company, and the Morosco Stock Company in southern California, where he gained experience in Shakespearean acting.

== Career ==
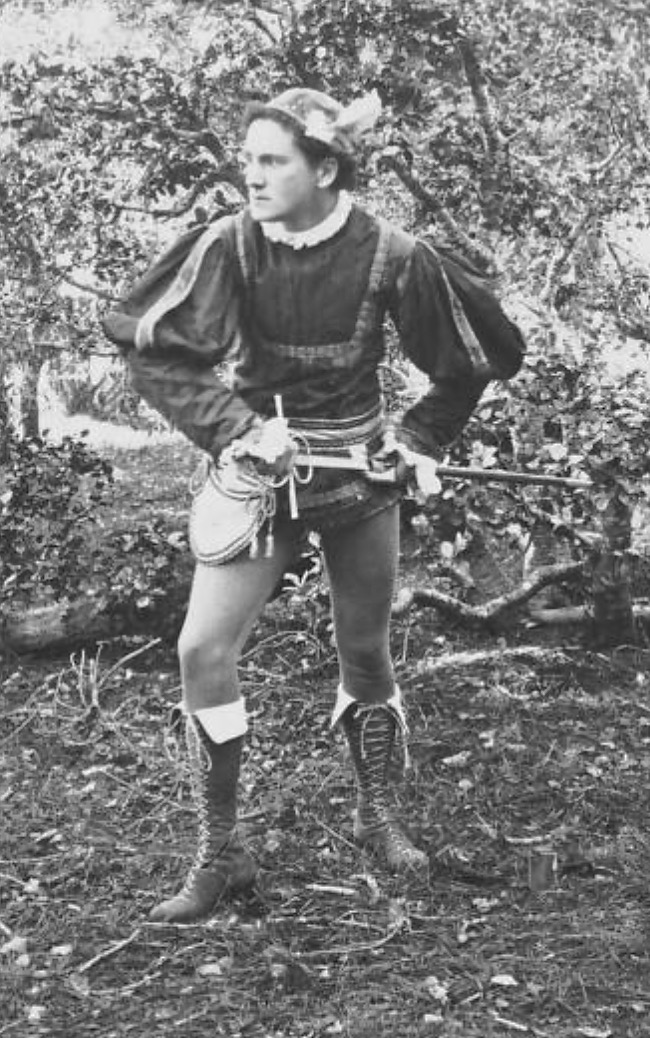
Heron in Romeo and Juliet, 1912

Heron married Sara Opal Piontkowski Heron Search in 1905, the daughter of a Polish Count. In 1908, Heron, his wife and daughter, came to the art colony at Carmel-by-the-Sea, California, where he built a home and was among the earliest writers. In 1910, he approached James Franklin Devendorf, co-founder of the Carmel Development Company, to purchase a lot for an outdoor theater. By February 1910, construction began on what would be called the Forest Theater with a platform stage and wooded benches. Devendorf paid the expenses to benefit Carmel. There was no electricity at the theater, so Heron used limelight floodlights brought by covered wagon from Monterey to light the stage.

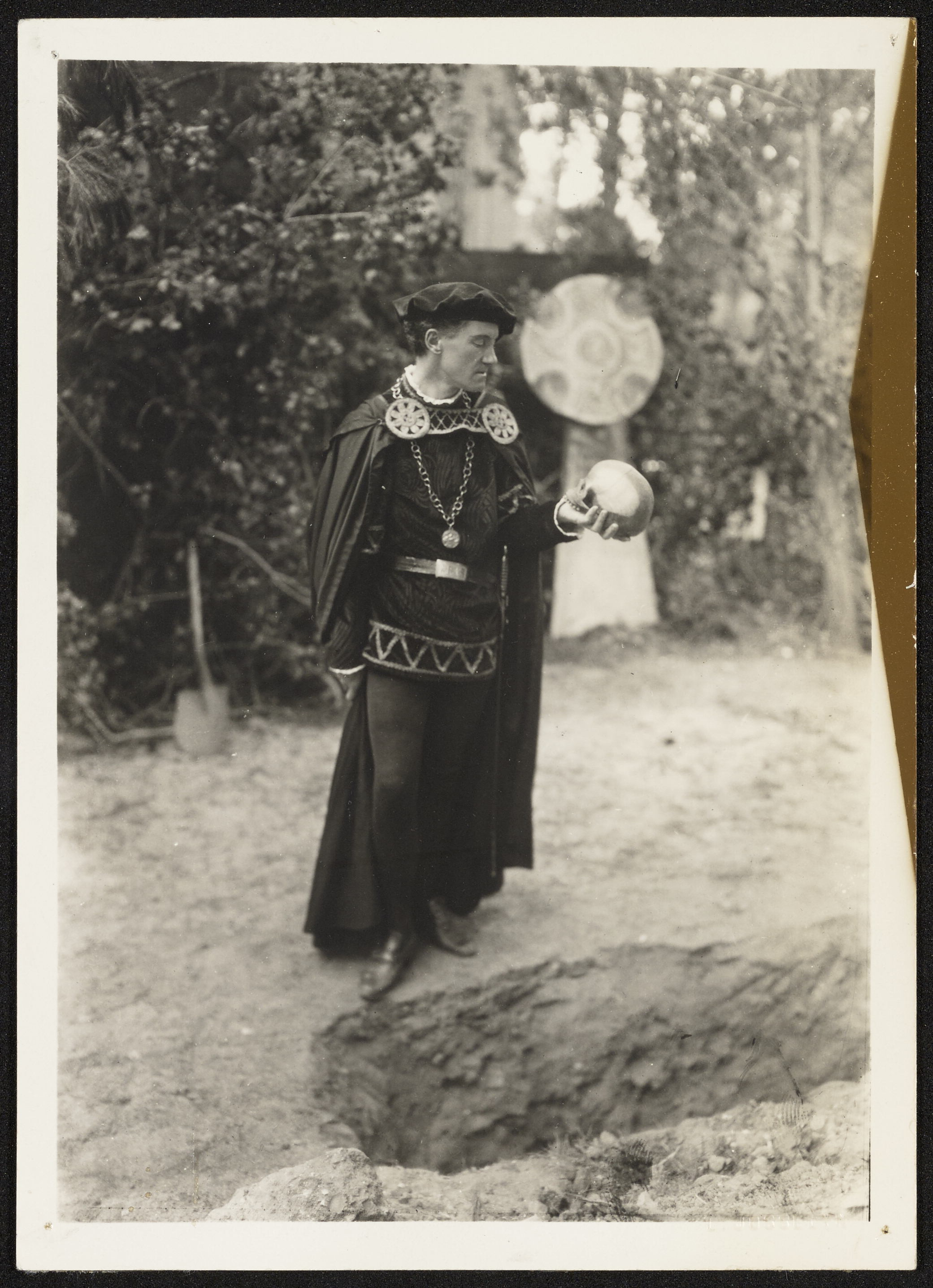
Heron in Hamlet (1926)

On July 9, 1910, Heron put on the first of the annual theatrical productions at Forest Theater. It was David, a biblical drama by Constance Lindsay Skinner, under the direction of Garnet Holme of University of California, Berkeley. Heron played the title role as David and writer Alice MacGowan played Astar. The play was reviewed in both Los Angeles and San Francisco newspapers, and it was reported that over 1,000 theatergoers attended the production. The second play was Twelfth Night, on July 3 and 4, 1911. Heron played Feste. In Carmel, he became part of the cultural circle that included Jack London, James Hopper, Mary Hunter Austin, Alice MacGowan, and Sinclair Lewis. In 1911, Heron directed the play The Land of Heart's Desire, by W. B. Yeats, at Forest Theater. One of his 1914 productions was Montezuma, with himself in the title role; it was the first of the plays he had written that he produced at the Forest Theater.

In 1916, Heron left Carmel with his wife and children for Los Angeles to be a director of the Little Theatre at the request of producer Aline Barnsdall. After his return to Carmel, he and his wife eventually divorced. In 1918, Heron opened the first Seven Arts bookstore, selling books, art materials, poetry, and antiques near Forest Theater. In 1923, Heron commissioned Michael J. Murphy to build the Seven Arts Shop for him and in partnership with Helena Conger, next to Edward G. Kuster's Carmel Weavers Studio in Carmel. In 1924, Heron married Conger. In 1925, he hired architect Albert B. Coats and builder Percy Parkes to build the Tudor Revival style building called the Seven Arts Building. The building is now the Carmel Bay Company. The building accommodated several art organizations, including the Carmel Art Association, and the studio of photographer Edward Weston.

In the late 1920s, concerned about Carmel being commercialized, Heron entered city politics. He was elected to city council and, in the 1930s, he served twice as mayor of Carmel. He was on Carmel's first planning commission. Heron resigned from the council in 1941 to devote more time to producing the Carmel Shakespeare Festival. He also owned and operated the Seven Art Book Shop in Carmel, which specialized in rare books.

In 1960, Heron finished his 50th year with Forest Theater with his play, Pharaoh.

== Death ==
Heron died on January 7, 1968, in Carmel-by-the-Sea, at the age of 84. Funeral services were private and held in the Little Chapel by the Sea in Pacific Grove, California.
