= Perry Newberry =

American poet and writer (1883-1968)

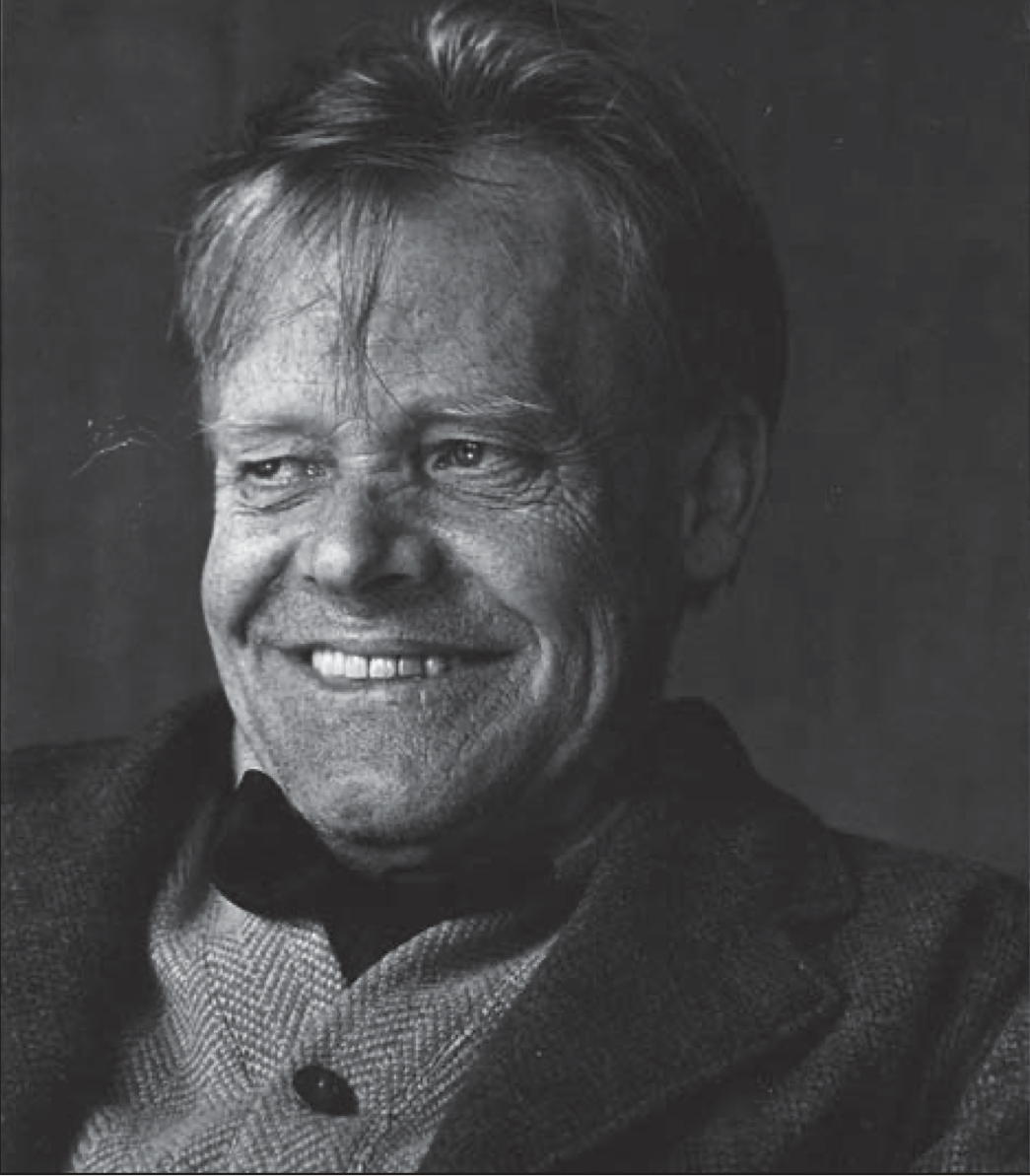
- Perry Newberry in a studio portrait by Edward Weston (1929)

5th Mayor of Carmel-by-the-Sea
- In office 1922–1924
- Preceded by: William L. Maxwell
- Succeeded by: William T. Kibbler

Personal details
- Born: Perry Harmon Newberry; October 16, 1870 Union City, Michigan, US
- Died: December 6, 1938 (aged 68) Carmel-by-the-Sea, California, US
- Spouses: Bertha Newberry (m. 1892; died 1934) Ida L. Brooks (m. 1936)
- Occupation: Writer, actor, producer, mayor

Perry Harmon Newberry (October 16, 1870 – December 6, 1938) was an American journalist, writer, actor and producer. After working in Chicago and then in journalism in San Francisco, he moved to Carmel-by-the-Sea, California in 1910. There he became involved as an actor and producer at Forest Theater, and in writing, directing and producing large-scale outdoor historical pageants. In 1922 he became the fifth mayor of Carmel-by-the-Sea, known for his efforts to maintain the rustic atmosphere of Carmel's art colony by resisting infrastructure improvements and to "keep Carmel free from tourists". In 1924 became the editor and co-publisher of the Carmel Pine Cone.

== Early life and career ==
Newberry was born on October 16, 1870, in Union City, Michigan. His parents were Frank D. Newberry (1840–1912) and Frances "Fannie" Ellsworth Stone (1848–1942). His father was a captain in US Army, serving in the American Civil War. His mother was a writer of children's literature. Newberry married Bertha née Blair in 1892.

Newberry started out as a printer and real estate agent in Chicago, Illinois. In 1897, he and his wife Bertha moved to San Francisco, California, where he was a reporter and editor of several newspapers, including in the art department of the San Francisco Examiner, and the San Francisco Post; he purchased the San Francisco Wave in 1901. He then reported for and edited papers in San Jose, California, and dipped his toe into politics and law enforcement there. At Frank Coppa's restaurant, known among Bohemians in San Francisco, he heard about an art colony at Carmel-by-the-Sea, California.

Newberry and his wife moved to Carmel in 1910 by stage coach. He bought one of the first lots sold by Frank Devendorf and Frank Powers in 1910. For many years, he led the efforts of the residents there to maintain the integrity and rustic atmosphere of Carmel's art colony by preventing infrastructure improvements, such as paved roads, sidewalks and streetlights.

== Forest Theater; War years ==
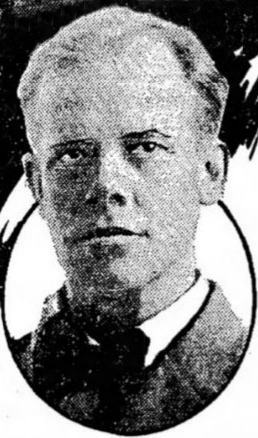
Newberry in 1922

Black Boulder Claim by Newberry (1926)

Newberry became involved with the Forest Theater Society of Carmel, acting, producing, directing and writing plays, and became president at the theater. On July 9, 1910, Herbert Heron produced the first of the annual theatrical productions at the Forest Theater. The play was David, a biblical drama by Constance Lindsay Skinner under the direction of Garnet Holme of University of California, Berkeley. Newberry's wife, Bertha, had a role in the play. The show was reviewed in both Los Angeles and San Francisco papers, and it was reported that over 1,000 theatergoers attended the production. The second play was the Twelfth Night, produced on July 3 and 4, 1911, at the Forest Theater. Newberry played Sir Toby Belch. In July 1912, Newberry produced the play Alice in Wonderland at the Forest Theater, a dramatization of Lewis Carroll's book.

Newberry supported himself as a writer, producing short stories and novels. His other projects during these years included writing, producing and directing (and sometimes appearing in) large-scale outdoor historical play-pageants in California, including in Santa Cruz (1914) and Long Beach (1914 and 1915), and at the San Francisco Panama–Pacific International Exposition and the Fresno District Fair (with a planned cast of 2,000), both in 1915, as well as those in Carmel. His first such pageant, which he wrote, was in Carmel in 1911.

In 1917, Newberry enlisted as a soldier during World War I and served as a YMCA secretary with the 77th division, American Expeditionary Forces. He was gassed in the war. He developed a plan, that Monterey County endorsed, to arm and equip a military body of men for the defense of the county and coast line.

== Mayor and editor ==
In the 1920s, concerned about Carmel's growth and commercialization, Newberry entered city politics. In 1922, he was elected to the Carmel board of trustees and in May of that year was chosen by the trustees as the fifth mayor of Carmel. He was known for his efforts to "keep Carmel free from tourists" and "keep Carmel off the Map." He was elected as city trustee again in 1926.

After the war, Newberry continued to write children’s stories, short stories and mystery novels; he co-wrote five detective stories with Carmel writer Alice MacGowan in the 1920s. He also designed several houses in Carmel. One is called Sticks and Stones, or The Perry Newberry Cottage, a craftsman-style house built in 1937 by Maynard McEntire on the northern side of Vista Avenue to the west of Junipero Avenue. A street in Carmel is named Perry Newberry Way.

In 1926, Newberry became the editor and co-publisher of the local weekly newspaper, the Carmel Pine Cone. He was the paper's co-publisher until he sold it in 1935. A couple of years after Bertha died, Newberry remarried Ida L. Brooks, a Berkeley public health nurse, in September 1936.

== Death ==
Newberry died on December 6, 1938, from heart failure, in Carmel-by-the-Sea, at age 68.
