= Mary Young Hunter =

New Zealand painter

- Born: Mary Towgood; April 11, 1872; Napier, New Zealand
- Died: September 8, 1947 (aged 75); Monterey, California, US
- Occupation: Painter
- Spouse: John Young-Hunter
- Children: 1

Mary Young Hunter or Young-Hunter (1872 – 1947) was a New Zealand painter. Her works were included in the book Women Painters of the World.

== Early life ==
Hunter was born Mary Towgood, on April 11, 1872, in Napier, New Zealand. She was the daughter of Edward Towgood (1838-1882) and Edith Emma Tyler (1849-1919). At the age of nine, she left New Zealand on a sailing ship and came to England where she lived until she went to school in Lausanne, Switzerland. She married John Young-Hunter on November 18, 1899, in Kensington, England. He was a well-known English Painter. She had a daughter, Gabrielle Young-Hunter, who married Edward G. Kuster in Germany in 1928.

== Career ==
In 1889, she and her husband traveled to Italy, where they lived in a studio in Florence. She painted in Perugia, Assisi, and Siena. Both she and her husband were involved in the new Pre-Raphaelitism group of painters. In 1920, she learned the technique of Gesso painting, a paint mixture used by early Italian artists.

She studied art at the Royal Academy Schools in England, where she won four medals. She exhibited at the Royal Academy in 1900, where she showed the paintings The Ducke's High Dame and The Denial.

She was a lifelong friend of Princess Louise, Duchess of Argyll, the fourth daughter of Queen Victoria. Mary Hunter painted the son of Sir Arthur McKenzie, the daughters of Lord and Lady Londonderry, the son of Lord and Lady Castlereagh, Mary and Catherine Pillsbury, Henry McKnight, the daughter of Mr. and Mrs. Amos Pinchot, the daughters of Jean Webster and Blanchette Hooker (now Mrs. John D. Rockefeller, III). She also painted American diplomat Sumner Welles as the age of three. One of last works was an unfinished portrait of her granddaughter Marcia Kuster.

She came to Carmel-by-the-Sea, California with her daughter Gabrielle in 1924. She was the owner of a Tudor Storybook style house, now called the Mary Young-Hunter House. It is on the northeast corner of Torres Street and Ocean Avenue, designed and built by Hugh Comstock in 1927. She later moved to Carmel Valley.

== Works ==
Hunter's works were included in the book Women Painters of the World. 2 artworks by or after Mary Young Hunter at the Art UK site.

- Joy and the Labourer
- Olivia
- Where Shall Wisdom be Found?

== Death ==
Hunter died on September 8, 1947, in Carmel-by-the-Sea, California, at the age of 75. Services were held at the El Carmelo Cemetery in Pacific Grove.

== Gallery ==
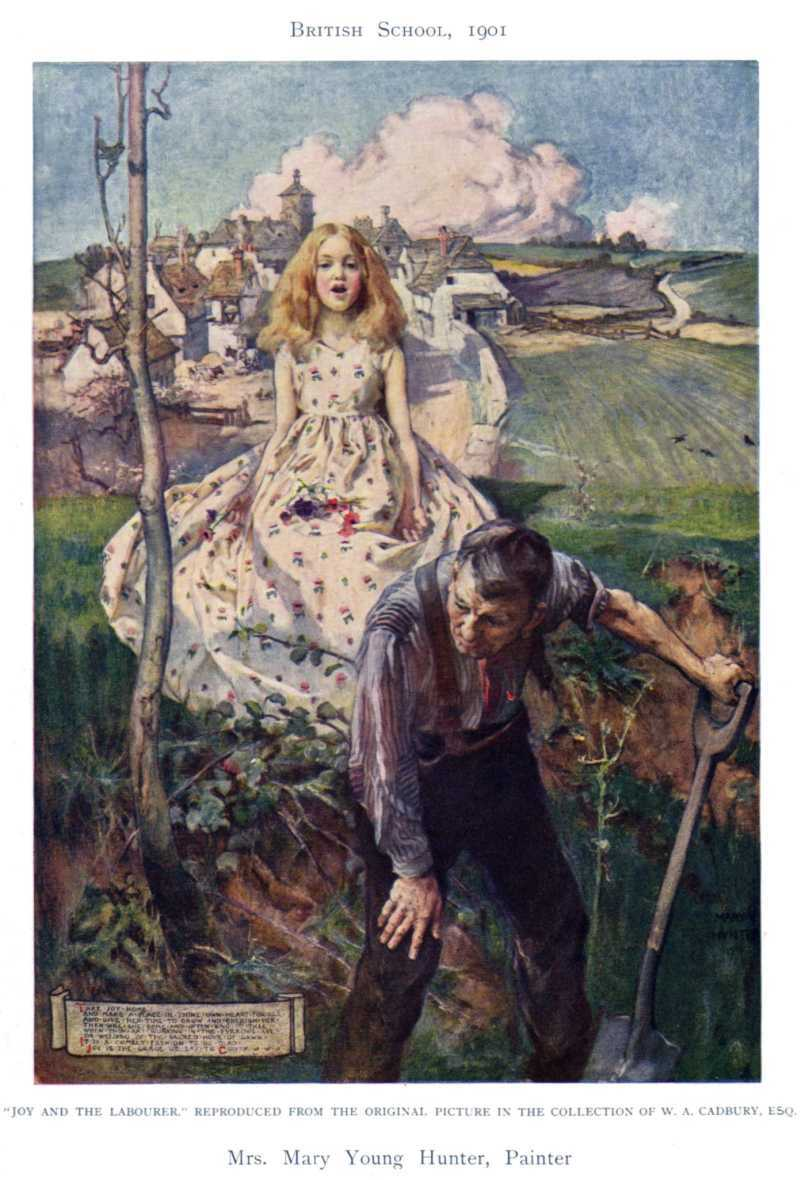
Joy and the Labourer

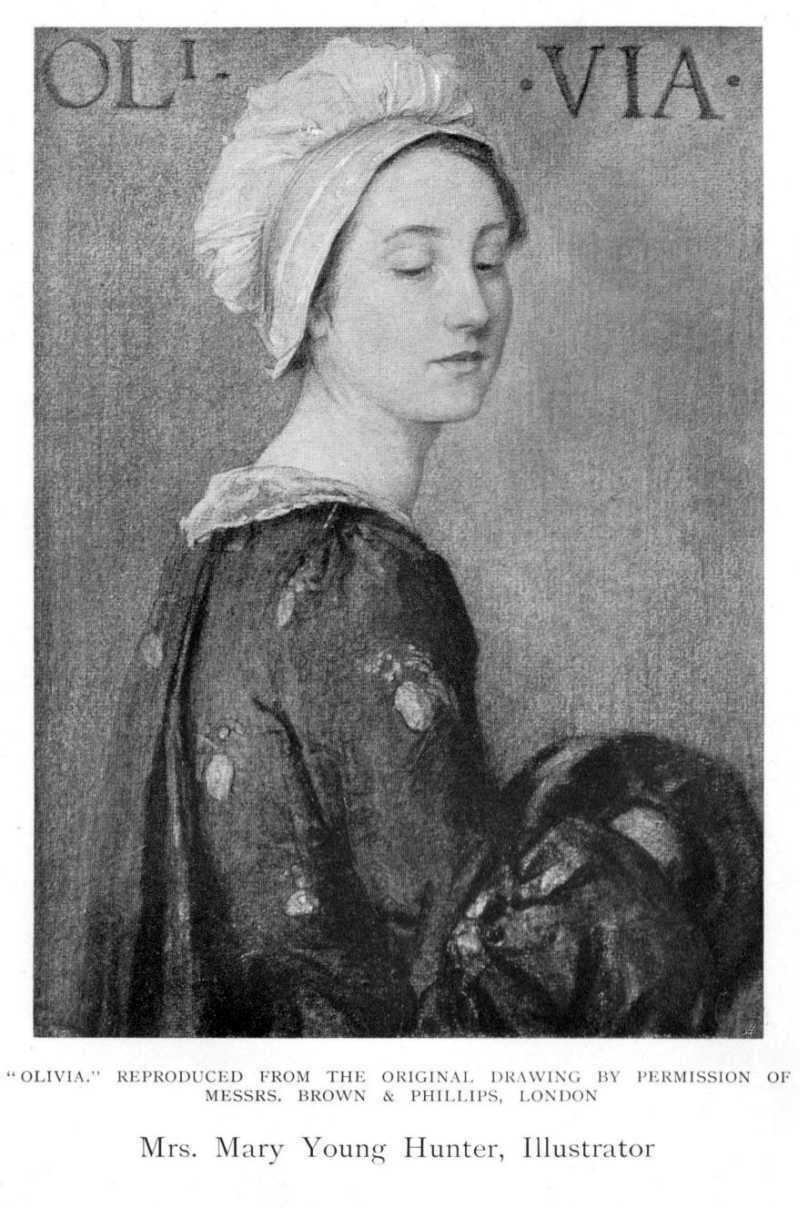
Olivia

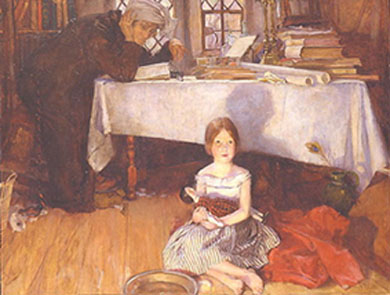
Where Shall Wisdom be Found?
