= Forest Theater =

Amphitheater in California, U.S.

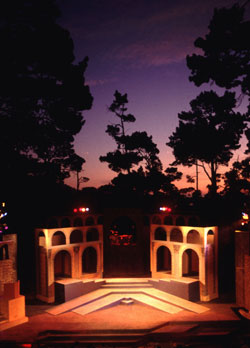
- Sunset over Forest Theater in 1997

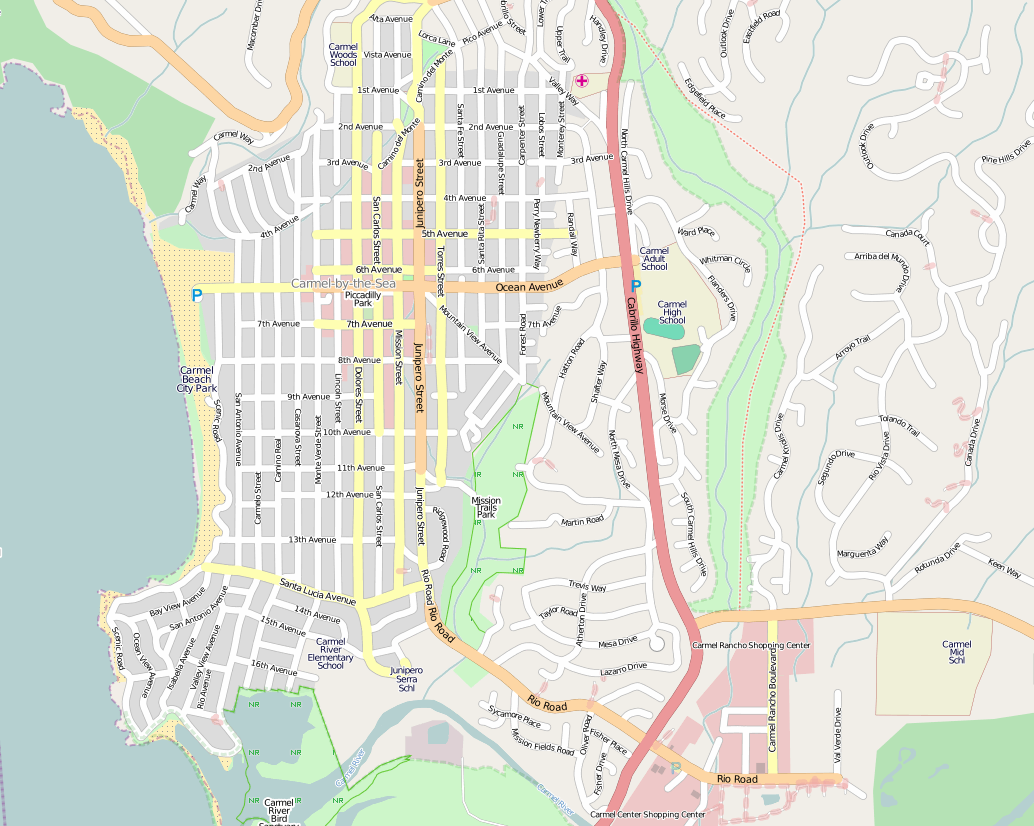
- Location within Carmel, California Location within California

General information
- Type: Amphitheatre
- Location: Santa Rita St, Carmel-by-the-Sea, California, United States
- Coordinates: 36°33′13″N 121°55′00″W
- Opened: July 10, 1910
- Owner: City of Carmel-by-the-Sea

Design and construction
- Architect: Works Progress Administration (WPA)

Website
- Official website Forest Theater Guild

The Forest Theater is an outdoor amphitheater in Carmel-by-the-Sea, California. Founded in 1910, it is one of the oldest outdoor theaters west of the Rocky Mountains. The facility hosts events produced by the Forest Theater Guild, Pacific Repertory Theatre (PacRep), Monterey Symphony and other arts organizations, and films and civic events. It also includes a smaller indoor theatre and a school.

Herbert Heron helped to build, and began to produce, plays at the theater beginning in 1910. These included original and contemporary works and classic ones, such as Shakespeare plays. Another early playwright and director was Mary Austin. Between 1915 and 1924, the theater staged 50 plays and musicals. In 1924, the Carmel Club of Arts and Crafts, which purchased the land, formed the Forest Theater Corporation to produce the plays. During the Great Depression, the theater accumulated debt. With repairs needed, in 1937, the Club deeded the theater to the City of Carmel-by-the-Sea to obtain Works Progress Administration (WPA) funds for renovations. The WPA rebuilt the theater and created an indoor facility beneath the outdoor stage.

The site re-opened in 1942 as The Carmel Shakespeare Festival, with Heron as its director. Except for the World War II years of 1943–44 and 1946, productions continued. In 1949, Heron and villagers started the Forest Theater Guild, a community organization to produce plays and help the city maintain the theater. In 1958, the city council instituted an Arts Commission to operate the theater. Heron continued to direct, write and star. The Guild disbanded, and Forest Theater ceased most operations, in 1961. The city used the site for such purposes as Boy Scout camps. From 1968 to 2010, Marcia Hovick's Children's Experimental Theatre (CET) leased the indoor theater to train young people. In 1969, Hovick formed the Staff Players Repertory Company to stage classic drama in the Indoor Forest Theater. In 1971, a second Forest Theater Guild was established and soon began to produce summer musicals and community plays on the outdoor stage.

In 1984, PacRep started producing classics, children's theater and musicals on the outdoor stage. PacRep reactivated the Carmel Shakespeare Festival in 1990 and continued to stage productions every September and October, expanding into August in 2000. Over the last decades of the 20th century, the Forest Theater Guild also produced over 20 plays. In 1997, the Guild began Films in the Forest, a film series. In 2011, after CET ceased operations, the school was leased to PacRep for its School of Dramatic Arts. In 2014, Forest Theater was closed for renovations. In 2016, the theater began performances again, but in 2019, the site's manager cancelled the Guild's 12-week theatre season, offering only 12 dates for film presentations. In 2021, the theater reopened with a seven-week season produced by PacRep. The next year, PacRep became the manager of the facility.

== History ==
=== Forest Theater Society ===
Herbert Heron located a picturesque concave property in Carmel-by-the-Sea, California, and approached James Franklin Devendorf, co-founder of the Carmel Development Company, about purchasing it for an outdoor theatre. Devendorf offered to let the theatre use the property without charge and assisted in the clearing the land and building the wooden proscenium stage of the 540-seat outdoor amphitheater. From 1910, Heron staged plays by authors from Carmel with local residents as performers, under the name Forest Theater Society.

The first theatrical production, David, a six-act biblical drama written by Constance Lindsay Skinner, under the direction of Garnet Holme of Berkeley, inaugurated Forest Theater on July 9, 1910. More than 1,000 theatergoers attended the production. Heron produced and acted in the play as David, Helen MacGowan Cooke played the character Michal, with Joseph Hand as Hushai, in a cast of Carmel area residents.

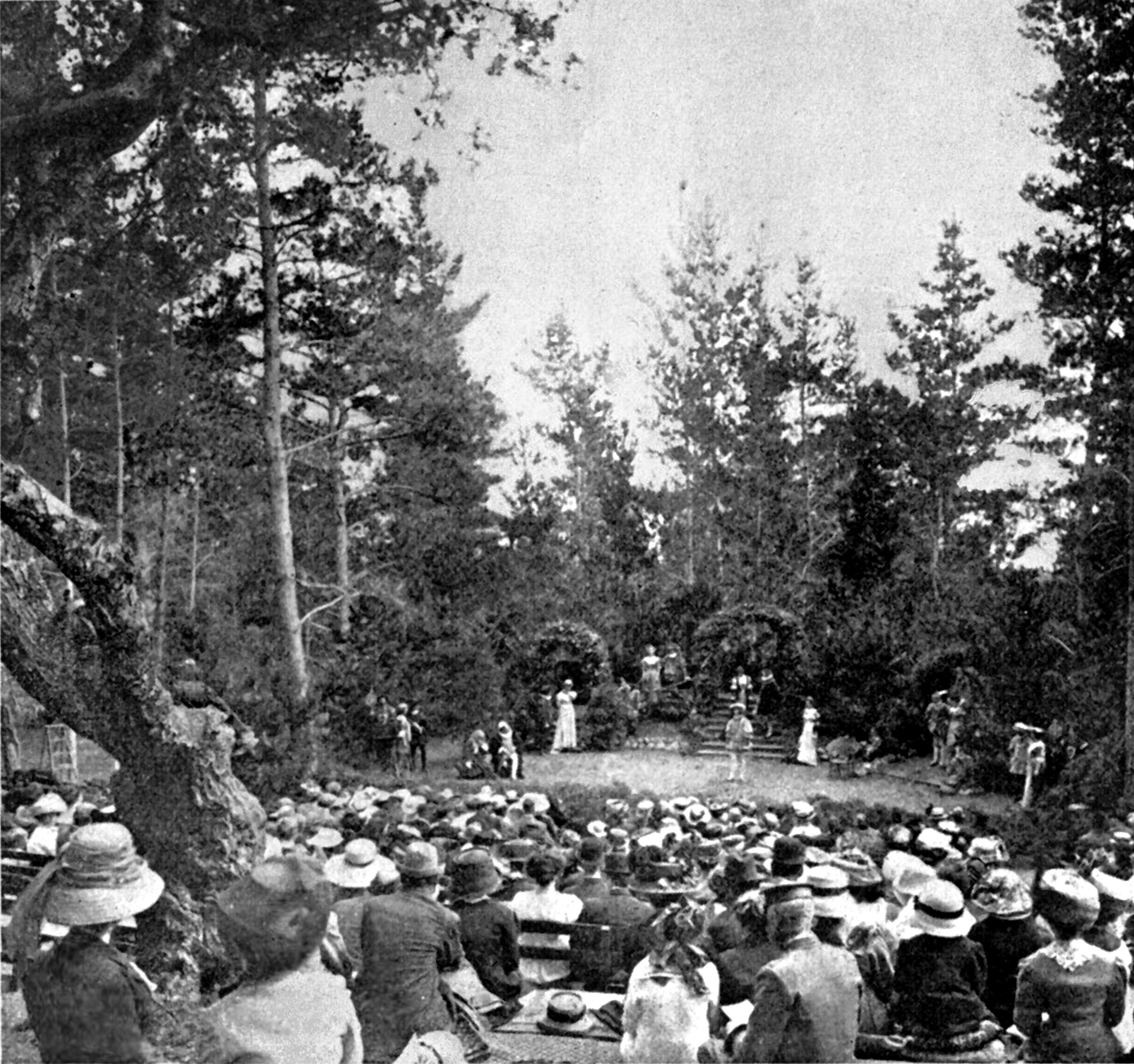
1911 production of Twelfth Night

Before electricity was installed at the theater in 1912, limelight floodlights were brought by covered wagon from Monterey to light the stage. Two bonfires were also lit in semi-circular stone firepits on opposite ends of the proscenium, a tradition which continues today. In July 1911, William Shakespeare's Twelfth Night opened the second season at Forest Theater. Garnet Holme was the producer. Forest Theater Society produced several other plays in the next few years, including the 1911 production of the play The Land of Heart's Desire given by the Carmel Club of Arts and Crafts, and the 1912 production of The Toad, by Carmel resident Bertha Newberry, the wife of Perry Newberry. That year, the first children's play was staged at Forest Theater, Alice in Wonderland, adapted by Newberry and painter Arthur Honywood Vachell.

=== Western Drama Society and Carmel Club of Arts and Crafts ===
In 1913 the theater produced four new productions: a Robin Hood drama, Runnymede; Newberry's play for children, Aladdin; Mary Austin's Fire starring George Sterling and directed by Austin; and Takeshi Kanno's poem-play Creation-Dawn. A split in the ranks of the Forest Theater Society caused Sterling and Heron to found the California (or Western) Drama Society, which produced plays in competition with the Carmel Club of Arts and Crafts; the factions were eventually reconciled. In 1915, a season of 11 productions included Newberry's Junipero Serra premiered, a historical pageant about Father Junípero Serra with Frederick Bechdolt as Serra. Joseph Hand had his farewell appearance on August 7, 1915, in the play The Man from Home, by Harry Leon Wilson and Booth Tarkington. In 1916 two of the productions were Yolanda of Cyprus and The Piper, for which the scenery was painted by Carmel artists William Frederic Ritschel and Laura W. Maxwell, who also appeared in the plays.

Herbert Heron as Hamlet in 1926

Other notable artists who acted at, or designed sets for, the theater include Frederick R. Bechdolt, Josephine M. Culbertson, Xavier Martinez, Jo Mora, Ira Mallory Remsen and Herman Rosse. Forest Theater reached its peak production between 1915 and 1924, with 50 plays and musicals staged, including a 1922 production of Shaw's Caesar and Cleopatra, directed by Edward G. Kuster. (Note: The California State Library has a collection of images from the theater's plays.) Also in 1922, Carmel's Serra festival featured Garnet Holme's Carmel Mission play Serra at the theater. Remsen produced Inchling in 1922 and Mr. Bunt in 1924. The overabundance of plays became a strain on resources, and the quality of theater in Carmel began to decline. In 1924, the competing producing organizations disbanded, and the Forest Theater Corporation was created to produce and manage the plays staged at Forest Theater. Productions at Forest Theater became a village affair, with residents volunteering their time to build sets, make costumes and act; the resulting success enabled the Carmel Club of Arts and Craftsto buy the land from the Carmel Development Company in 1925. In 1927, the Club and Forest Theater were sold to the Abalone League, and the proceeds were used to pay off the theater's debts.

=== 1930s to 1961 and closure ===
During the Great Depression, Forest Theater accumulated debt. In 1934, it celebrated its 100th production, The Man Who Married a Dumb Wife by Anatole France, a comedy directed by Heron. In September 1936, Remsen's Inchling was presented again; which, together with a village fair at the theater grounds, helped reduced the theater's debt.

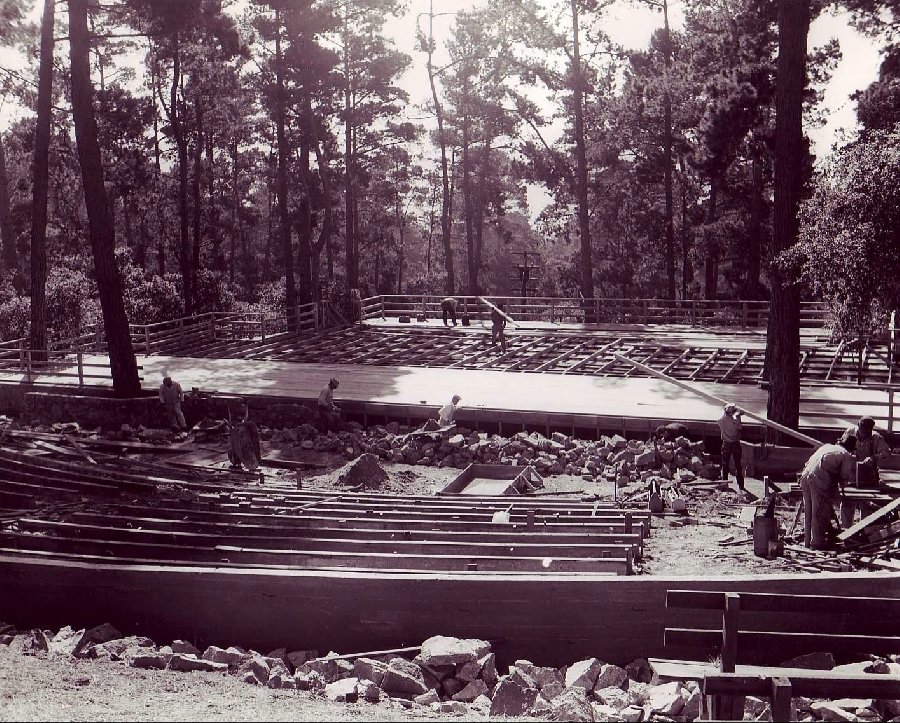
WPA workers rebuilding Forest Theater in 1939.

When repairs were needed and no local donors could be found, the theater looked into applying for WPA money. Funds were only available to government entities, and the private non-profit Club of Arts and Crafts was not eligible. In 1937, the Club deeded the theater to the City of Carmel-by-the-Sea to obtain WPA funds for major renovations, with the stipulation that the facility would be a public park and continue to offer outdoor performances. In 1939 the site became a Works Progress Administration (WPA) project, and Forest Theater was closed during the three years of renovations. The WPA rebuilt the outdoor theatre and created an indoor facility beneath the outdoor stage. The site re-opened in 1942 as The Carmel Shakespeare Festival, with Heron as its director. The festival offered Shakespeare, including Macbeth, Hamlet, Julius Caesar and As You Like It, as well as the works of Carmel authors, including the first local production of Robinson Jeffers' The Tower Beyond Tragedy. During World War II, mandatory blackouts were ordered for coastal towns and cities. The residents of Carmel participated and halted all Forest Theater activity, essentially closing the facility in 1943–44, and again in 1946.

From 1947 to 1949, the facility resumed annual productions of Shakespeare and local authors. In 1949, Heron and twenty villagers started the first Forest Theater Guild, a community organization, to produce plays and help the city maintain the theater. In 1958, the city council also instituted an Arts Commission, charged with operation and maintenance of Forest Theater. Heron continued to write, direct, and star; in 1960, he finished his 50th year with the theater with his own play, Pharaoh. The Guild disbanded in 1961, and Forest Theater ceased most operations in 1961. By the mid-1960s, the Forest Theater Guild had closed and abandoned the facility, and, with a few minor exceptions, no plays were shown on the main stage. The city began to use the site for other purposes, such as Boy Scout camps. Heron died in 1968.

=== 1968 to 2010 ===
From 1968 to 2010, Marcia Hovick's Children's Experimental Theatre (CET) leased the facility's indoor theater. Formed in 1960 by Marcia Hovick to develop "creative confidence" through theatre training, CET had been using space at the Golden Bough Playhouse and Sunset Center, and needed a permanent place for their activities. In 1969, Hovick formed a new production entity called the Staff Players Repertory Company, staging classic drama on the small Indoor Forest Theater stage. The main stage remained unused, and in 1971, the Cultural Commission considered closing the theater for good. Residents of Carmel voiced opposition. A second Forest Theater Guild was established with Cole Weston as its president. To raise needed funds and draw attention to the possible closure, the new group produced a staged reading of Robinson Jeffers' Medea and The Tower Beyond Tragedy, which featured actress Dame Judith Anderson. Mayor Gunnar Norberg and Weston, recognizing the theater's cultural significance and historical value, rallied the community to a preserve the theater. In 1972, to raise funds for the theater's preservation, Norberg, Weston and the Guild staged their first full production of William Shakespeare's Twelfth Night, and the Guild began producing summer musicals and community plays on the outdoor stage.

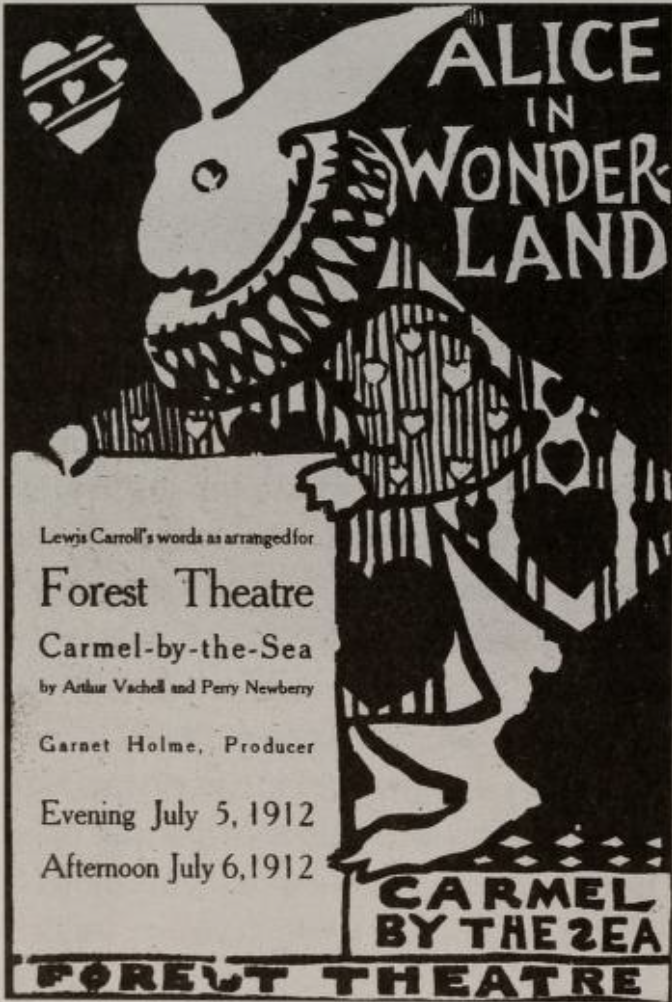
Program for Alice in Wonderland, 1912

In 1984, Pacific Repertory Theatre (PacRep), originally called GroveMont Theatre, started producing classics, children's theater and musicals on the outdoor stage, beginning with Jeffers' Medea. PacRep reactivated the Carmel Shakespeare Festival in 1990. PacRep continued to stage productions at Forest Theater every September and October, expanding into August in 2000. Meanwhile, over the last decades of the 20th century, the Forest Theater Guild produced over 20 plays, including Moon for the Misbegotten and Long Day's Journey into Night. In 2005, PacRep presented the theater's highest-attended production, Disney's Beauty and the Beast; more than 10,000 people bought tickets.

In 1997, the Guild began Films in the Forest, a series of first-run movies, classic feature films, and documentary film screenings.

=== 2010 to present ===
In 2011, after CET ceased operations, the City of Carmel awarded the year-round lease of the indoor theater at Forest Theater to Pacific Repertory Theatre for its educational program, the School of Dramatic Arts. On April 23, 2014, the facility was shuttered due to health and safety issues caused by years of deferred maintenance. On May 5, 2014, the city council declared a "cultural community emergency" and planned to reopen the theater as soon as possible. In January 2015, anticipating delays in the renovations, the city announced that the reopening of the theater would be postponed until 2016, and the theater companies cancelled their upcoming seasons. After a contentious design period, a two-phase project was approved by the city council. Phase 1 addressed the safety and ADA compliance requirements, while phase 2 was planned to upgrade the concessions and restroom facilities, and make other improvements. In June 2016, the theater reopened and began performances again, including The Wizard of Oz and Twelfth Night.

In 2017, the nearby Sunset Center signed a 30-year lease with the city of Carmel to manage the site. In 2019, the Forest Theater Guild, announced that Sunset Center management had drastically cut back the Guild's 12-week season, offering only 12 dates at the historic theatre for film presentations, and no dates for their theatrical productions. The Guild asked the city council to intervene. In 2020, the venue was once again closed, this time due to the COVID-19 pandemic. In 2021, the Sunset Center sought an early end to their 30-year lease agreement. The city of Carmel solicited proposals for a new organization to manage the venue. In August 2021, the theater reopened with a seven-week run of Shrek, put on by PacRep.

In early 2022, the city of Carmel entered into a lease with Pacific Repertory Theatre for the nonprofit to manage the venue for the next five years, with a five-year renewal option. The Forest Theater Guild was designated an "historic user". The venue continues to host events produced by the Forest Theater Guild, PacRep, Monterey Symphony and other arts organizations, and films and civic events.

== See also ==
- List of contemporary amphitheaters
