= Golden Bough Playhouse =

Theater in Carmel-by-the-Sea, California, United States

Golden Bough complex
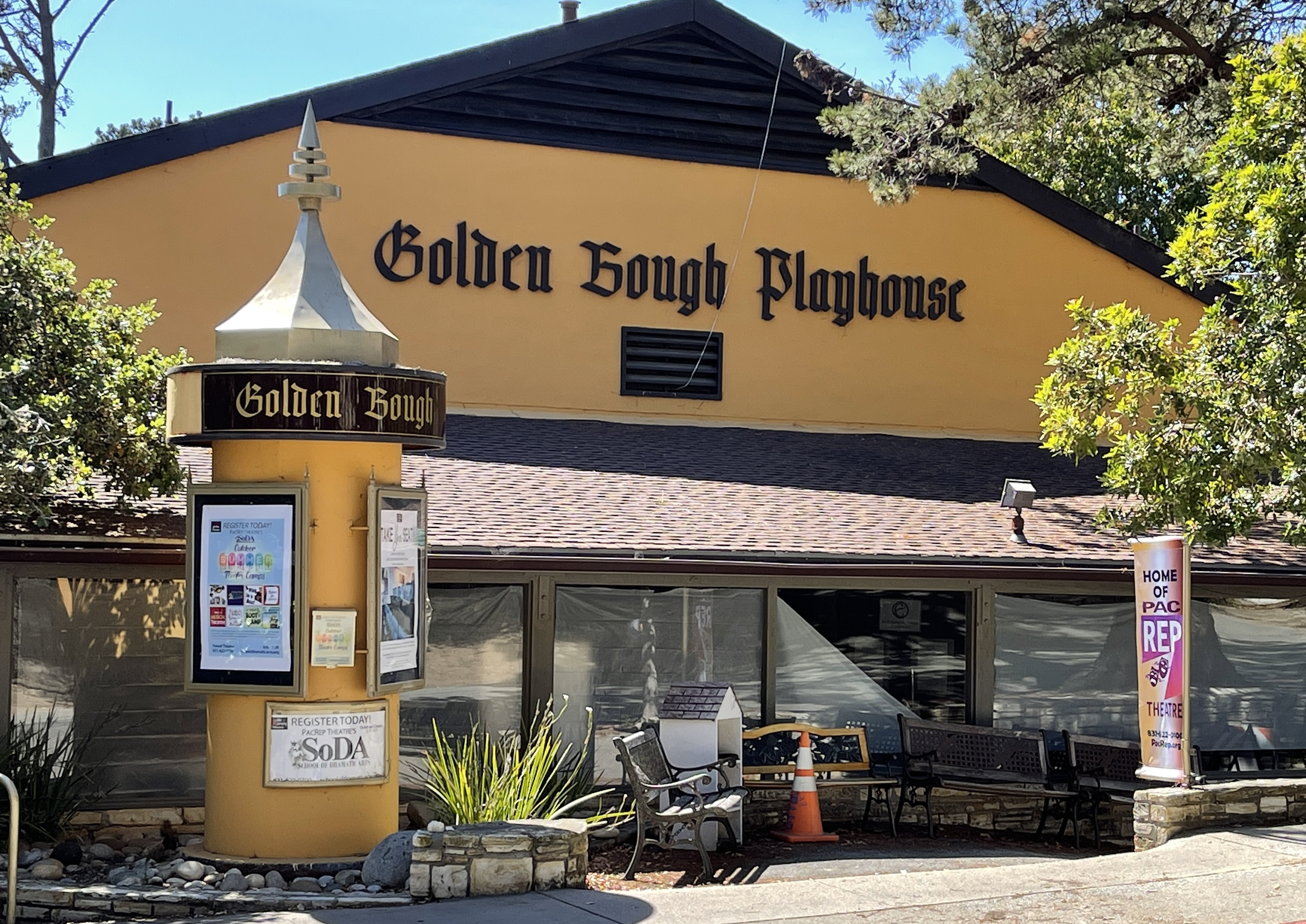
- Golden Bough Playhouse
- Interactive map of Golden Bough complex
- Former names: Arts & Crafts Hall, Abalone Theatre, Theatre of the Golden Bough, Manzanita Theatre, Filmarte, Golden Bough Cinema
- Address: Monte Verde Street
- Location: Carmel-by-the-Sea, California, U.S.
- Coordinates: 36°33′6.61″N 121°55′27.95″W
- Owner: Pacific Repertory Theatre
- Capacity: Founders Theatre: 280; Circle Theatre: 120
- Type: Regional theatre

Construction
- Built: 1952
- Architect: James Pruitt

The Golden Bough Playhouse is a theatre complex in Carmel-by-the-Sea, California, the third in a succession of theatres associated with the name Golden Bough dating to 1924. Located on Monte Verde Street, the present facility contains the 280-seat Founders Theatre and the 120-seat Circle Theatre. The facility has been operated by Pacific Repertory Theatre since 1994.

The first theatre in Carmel named Golden Bough, Theatre of the Golden Bough, was built on Ocean Avenue by Edward G. Kuster in 1924. After that theatre was destroyed by fire in 1935, Kuster relocated his cinema lease operations to another of his properties, the former Arts and Crafts Theatre on Monte Verde Street, renaming it the Filmarte. In 1940 he reopened it as the Golden Bough Playhouse. That theatre burned down in 1949.

Kuster constructed the present Golden Bough Playhouse in 1952. The Founders Theatre presents both movies and live performances. Beneath it, the Circle Theatre, with a theatre-in-the-round format, has its entrance on Casanova Street, and is located on the former site of the Arts and Crafts Hall. Between 2011 and 2024, Pacific Repertory Theatre oversaw major restoration and renovation projects at the facility. It is the oldest indoor performing arts venue in Carmel-by-the-Sea.

== Early history ==
=== Carmel Club of Arts and Crafts and Kuster ===
In 1905, to foster the arts in the village of Carmel-by-the-Sea, California, the Carmel Club of Arts and Crafts was formed. After the 1906 San Francisco earthquake, the village received an influx of artists and other creative people escaping the disaster area, including writers and poets Mary Austin, George Sterling, Robinson Jeffers and Sinclair Lewis. In 1906–07, the club built the town's first cultural center and theatre, The Carmel Arts and Crafts Hall on Casanova Street in Carmel. The Club of Arts and Crafts exhibited art and organized lessons for aspiring painters, actors and craftsmen. The dramas presented at the Club also attracted considerable attention.

Edward G. Kuster, a musician, lawyer and sometime stage manager from Los Angeles, relocated to Carmel in 1920 to establish his own theatre and school. He joined the Carmel Club of Arts and Crafts and the Forest Theater Society and began directing plays in Carmel. In 1923–1924 the Club built a new theatre, the Carmel Arts and Crafts Theatre, on an adjacent lot on Monte Verde Street, Carmel.

=== Theatre of the Golden Bough ===
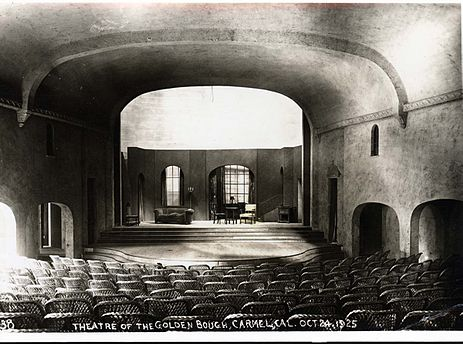
Theatre of the Golden Bough in 1925

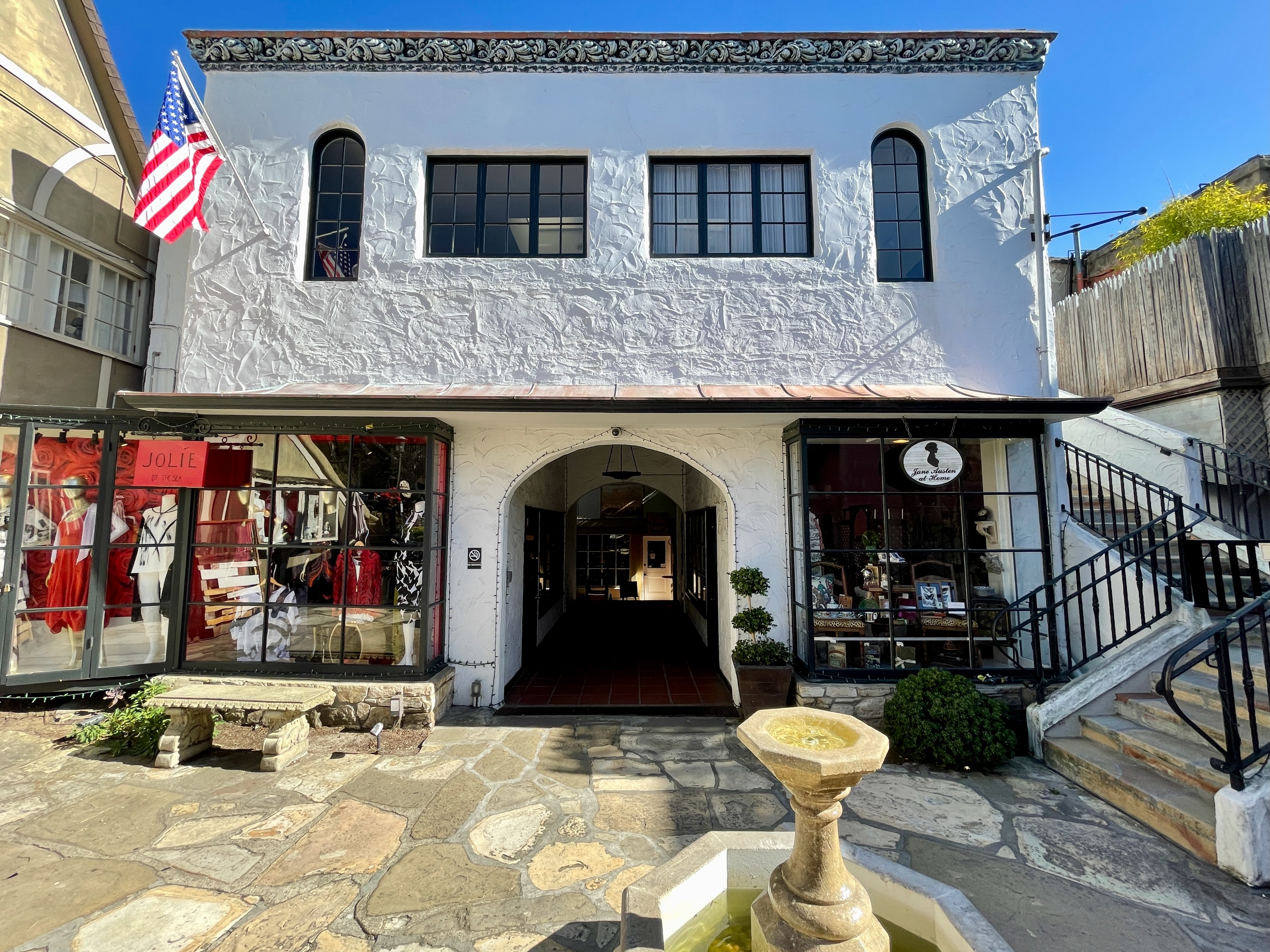
Entrance and courtyard to the Theatre of the Golden Bough

Theatrical activities in the town had become so popular that Kuster built a theatre in 1924, the Theatre of the Golden Bough, to compete with the Arts and Crafts Theatre. Kuster's new theatre opened on June 6, 1924. It borrowed the name "Golden Bough" from Roman mythology, where the Golden Bough refers to a branch with golden leaves that allows the Trojan hero Aeneas to journey safely through the underworld. The interior of the theatre had 360 seats with wicker arm chairs. The stage had a depth of thirty feet with spot and flood lights, and a cyclorama at the back of the stage gave the effect of vast spaces. The orchestra space was large enough to seat thirty to forty musicians. The theatre hosted 50 productions each year and also educational programs.

The theatre was located on Ocean Avenue, the main street in Carmel, between Lincoln Street and Monte Verde Street; in front was The Court of the Golden Bough, with a group of shops. Kuster was a musician and lawyer from Los Angeles who relocated to Carmel to establish his own theatre and school. In 1922 architect Lee Gottfried built the Carmel Weavers Studio on the corner of Ocean Avenue and Dolores Street; in 1924 Kuster had it rolled about block down Ocean Avenue, and it became the theatre's box office, in the Court. The first production at the theatre was Maurice Browne's play, The Mother of Gregory, with Ellen Van Volkenburg in the title-role. The play was followed by a nine-week drama school.

In 1928, Kuster leased the theatre to a local movie exhibitor, the Manzanita Theatre. He then traveled to Europe for a year to study production techniques in Berlin and to negotiate for rights to produce English and European plays in the United States. 1929, after his return, he leased the theatre to a movie chain for a period of five years. Kuster stipulated that the name "Golden Bough" could not be used for a movie house, so it was renamed the Carmel Theatre.

=== 1935 fire and sale of property ===
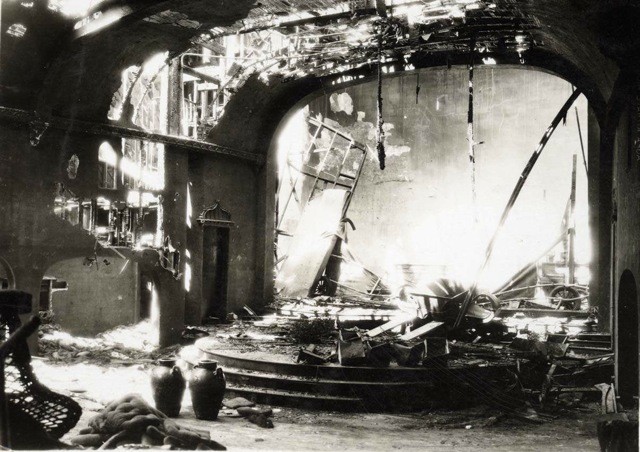
The Theatre of the Golden Bough after the 1935 fire

In 1935, Kuster renegotiated his lease with the movie tenants, allowing him to produce a stage play one weekend each month. On May 17, 1935, Kuster opened his production of the play By Candlelight, a German play by Siegfried Geyer adapted into English by P. G. Wodehouse. Two nights later, on May 19, the Theatre of the Golden Bough was destroyed by fire; arson was suspected. Kuster moved his film operation to the former Arts and Crafts Theatre on Monte Verde Street, which he owned, leasing it to the same tenants under the name Filmarte; it became the first "art house" between Los Angeles and San Francisco.

In 1950, Kuster sold the Court of the Golden Bough, the property that once surrounded the theatre's entrance, to Sumral and Ruth Otrich. This slice of land, measuring 47 ft (14 m) by 80 ft (24 m), is situated behind the present-day Cottage of Sweets. Otrich invested $50,000 (equivalent to $669,087 in 2025) to construct three English Tudor-style shops and three apartments on a second floor. Nearby was the restaurant called Sade's (now Portabella). Today, these buildings are part of the Court of the Golden Bough, where only the facade of the original Theatre of the Golden Bough remains and opens to an arcade courtyard featuring various shops. The theatre's box office also survived, along with the Weavers Studio, was later used as a dress shop owned by Anna Katz, and is now The Cottage of Sweets, a candy shop.

== Golden Bough Playhouse ==
=== Second theatre, 1949 fire, third theatre, cinema ===
In 1940, Kuster returned to Carmel; the film tenants' lease at Monte Verde Street had expired, and he renamed the theatre Golden Bough Playhouse and again presented plays and films year-round. In the summers of 1940 and 1941, he directed the Golden Bough School of Theatre. In 1949, after remounting By Candlelight, this second "Golden Bough" also burned down.

By 1950, Kuster created a nonprofit corporation to build a new theatre at the same location. In 1952, having raised $185,000 (equivalent to $2,242,951 in 2025), he built a three-story, two-theatre facility on the site, located at Monte Verde Street and 4SW 8th Avenue. The main auditorium, called Golden Bough Playhouse, originally with 330 seats and a large stage, was designed to present both movies and live performances. Beneath the main stage, an intimate 125-seat theatre-in-the-round was named Circle Theatre, with an entrance on Casanova Street and 4SE 8th Avenue. The new Golden Bough Playhouse opened its doors on October 2, 1952, with a Monterey Symphony Orchestra concert. The first theatrical production at the venue was The Merchant of Venice, opening on December 12, 1952.

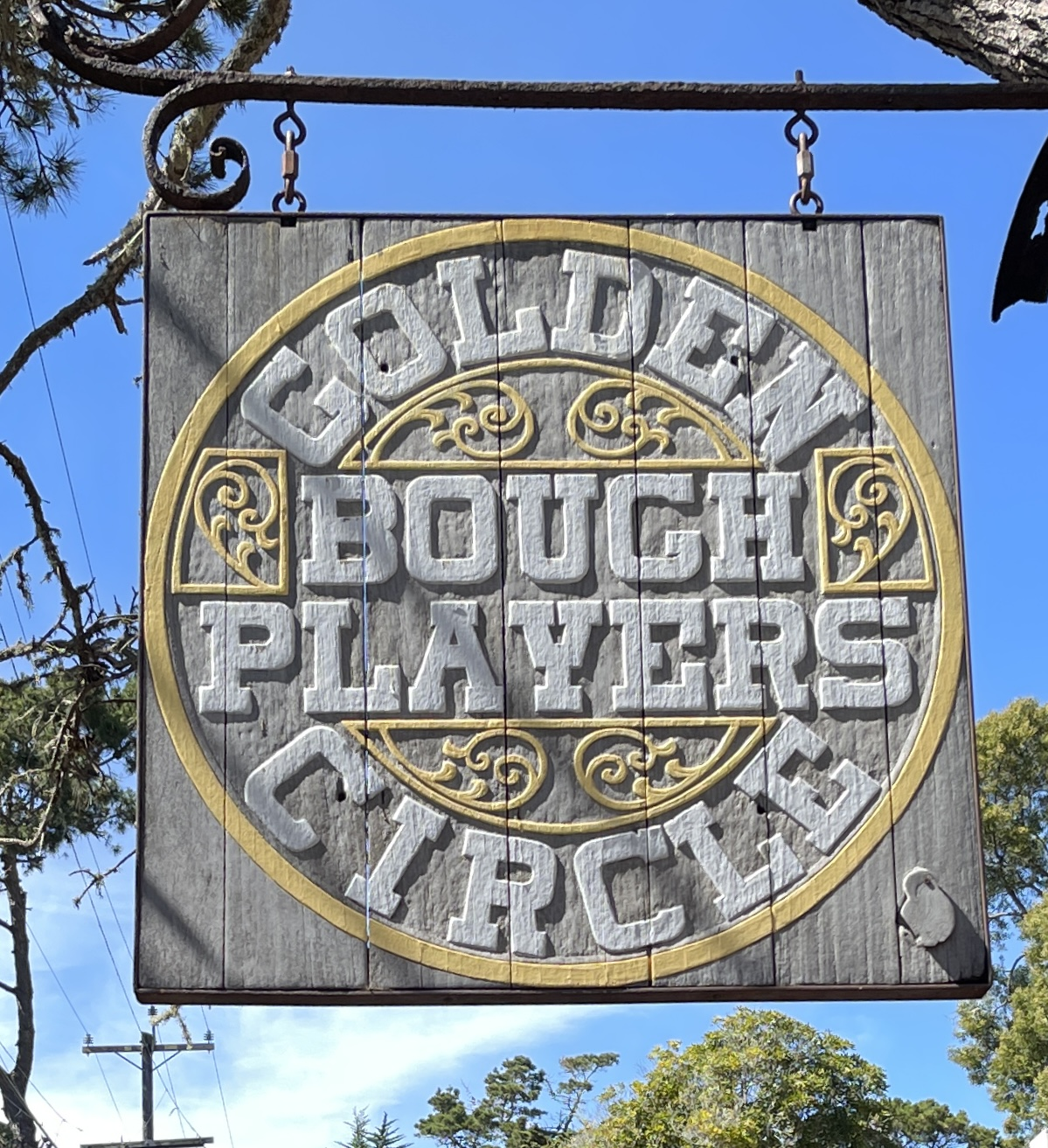
Golden Bough Players Circle, Carmel

Kuster died in September 1961; the theatre became a non-profit organization and was renamed the Community Theatre. In 1965 the facility was sold to United California Theatres, a movie chain later absorbed by United Artists Theaters. For the next 29 years the larger theatre was a first-run movie house known as Golden Bough Cinema. The Golden Bough Players Circle, a community group, continued to rent and perform at Circle Theatre, which later had 120 seats. Lacking funds for needed repairs, Circle Theatre closed in 1972, selling its assets to pay debts.

=== Pacific Repertory Theatre years ===
In 1994, United Artists sold the theatre to Pacific Repertory Theatre (PacRep). On September 22, 1994, the Golden Bough Playhouse reopened with Gilbert and Sullivan's The Mikado, followed by Shakespeare's A Midsummer Night's Dream. These were followed in 1995 by productions of Arthur Miller's Death of a Salesman and David Hirson's La Bête in Circle Theatre. By 1997, the second phase of a capital campaign concluded when a $300,000 challenge grant from the David and Lucile Packard Foundation was successfully matched. This reduced the debt outstanding on the mortgage to $275,000. In 1999, PacRep initiated a $1.6 million campaign to clear the remaining mortgage and undertake enhancements to the Playhouse. Under a new Equity contract, Olympia Dukakis and her husband Louis Zorich presented their adaptation of Anton Chekhov's The Cherry Orchard in July and August 2001.

In 2006, the Carmel Historic Resources Board gave approval for modifications to the building, and in 2008, PacRep presented plans to the Carmel Planning Commission. The first phase of remodeling was completed 2011 and included safety updates, a digital projection system, a double-revolving stage and upgrades to the Circle Theatre. Fundraising for the second phase, including a reconfiguration of the audience seating and the lobby, began in 2017, raised $10.8 million helped by $5 million from one donor. The phase 2 remodel began in 2021 and was completed in September 2024. The renovation included new lobbies and box office, with a new bar and kitchen. The main auditorium, renamed the Founders Theatre, has 280 comfortable seats with improved sight lines. All the technical systems, electrical, lighting, sound and multimedia, were modernized. The first production in the newly-renovated complex was Selina Fillinger's farce POTUS: Or, Behind Every Great Dumbass Are Seven Women Trying to Keep Him Alive.
