= Carmel Pine Cone =

Weekly newspaper published in Carmel-by-the-Sea, California

- First Issue of the Carmel Pine Cone (February 3, 1915)
- Type: Weekly newspaper
- Owner(s): Carmel Communications, Inc.
- Publisher: Paul Miller
- Founded: 1915
- Language: English
- Headquarters: Pacific Grove, CA Monterey County United States
- Circulation: 19,000
- OCLC number: 28146037
- Website: www.carmelpinecone.com

The Carmel Pine Cone is a free weekly Californian newspaper. It serves the city of Carmel-by-the-Sea and the surrounding Monterey Peninsula, Carmel Valley and Big Sur region of Monterey County in central California. The paper was once known for red-baiting. It is a newspaper of record for Monterey County.

== History ==
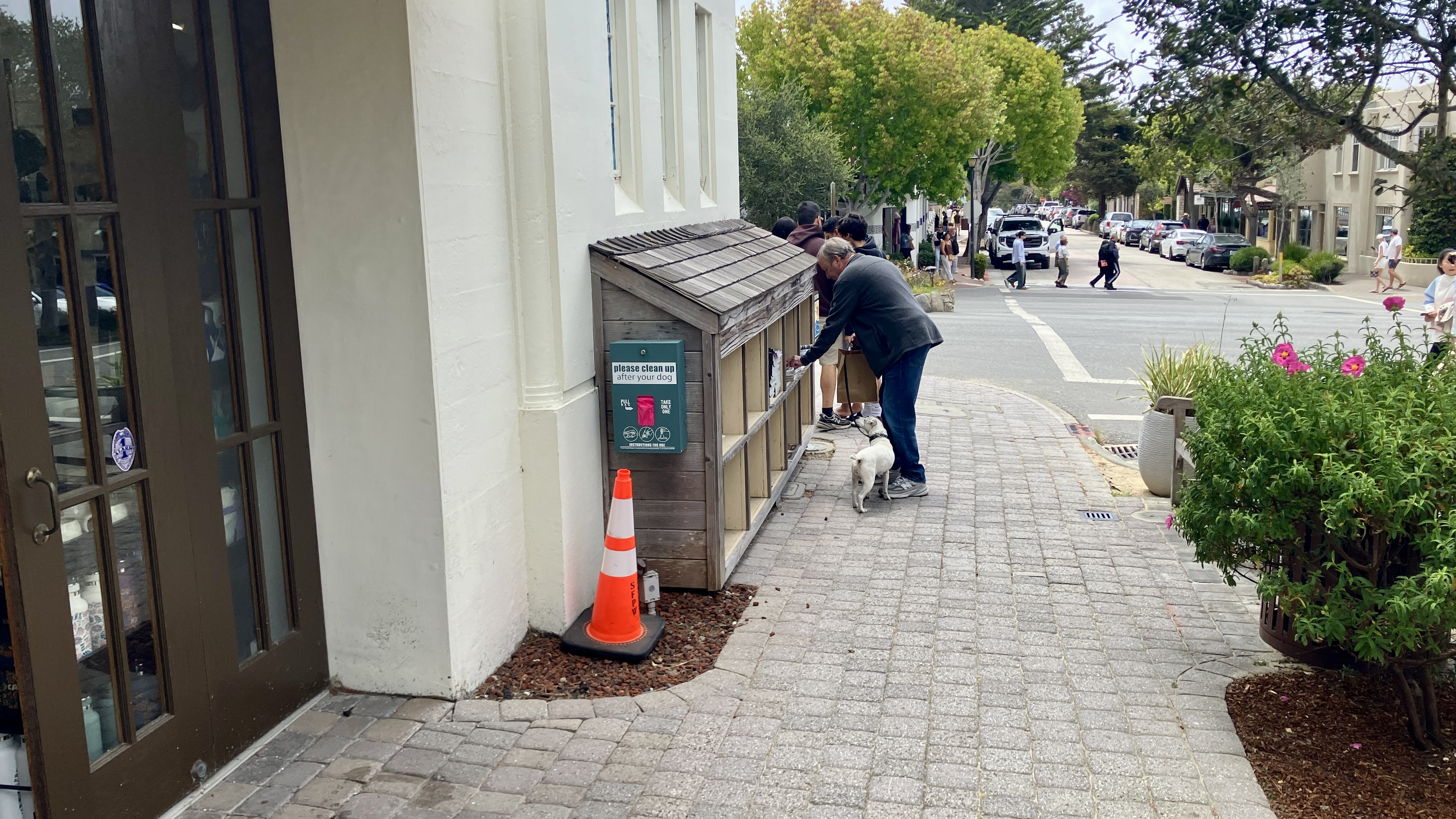
A man reaches for a copy of the Carmel Pine Cone at a free newspaper dispenser on Ocean Avenue, in downtown Carmel-by-the-Sea.

The Carmel Pine Cone was founded in 1915 by William L. Overstreet who proclaimed in the first four-page edition of 300 copies, "we are here to stay!" By 1924, the Pine Cone moved into the De Yoe Building, opposite of the Carmel Post Office.

Overstreet sold the paper in May 1926 to J.A. Easton, who then increased the paper to 16 pages, tabloid form. Two months later Easton entered a joint venture with Allen Griffin, owner of the Peninsula Daily Herald. The two men became co-owners of both papers. After four months, Easton sold his business shares to Griffin and Perry Newberry was brought on as the paper's editor and co-publisher.

Newberry was an author, playwright and activist who successfully ran for the office of city trustee. At some point he became a co-owner of the paper. Under him, the Pacific Grove Tribune wrote the Pine Cone "reflected the personality of the artists' colony as portrayed by Newberry, one of the old guard." Griffin sold his interests in 1930 to Hal Garrott, who in turn sold his shares two years later to Ronald Cockburn, the son of a wealthy Honolulu banker and a former staffer at the Honolulu Star-Bulletin. Cockburn redesigned and enlarged the Pine Cone. Newberry retired and sold his shares in 1934 to Ross C. Miller, former editor of The Bakersfield Californian.

In 1940, the Pine Cone was purchased by Carlos Drake, son of hotel owner Tracy Drake. The Santa Ana Register at the time described the paper as "a high class news and literary weekly in the northern art colony." Two years later the paper was acquired by Clifford H. Cook, who sold it in 1966 to Allman Cook, no relation. He sold the paper in 1969 to John Mustard and Wayne Everton, who owned The Squire, a weekly paper in Lafayette, California. The newspaper's offices moved in 1970 to the Goold Building and remained there until 2000.

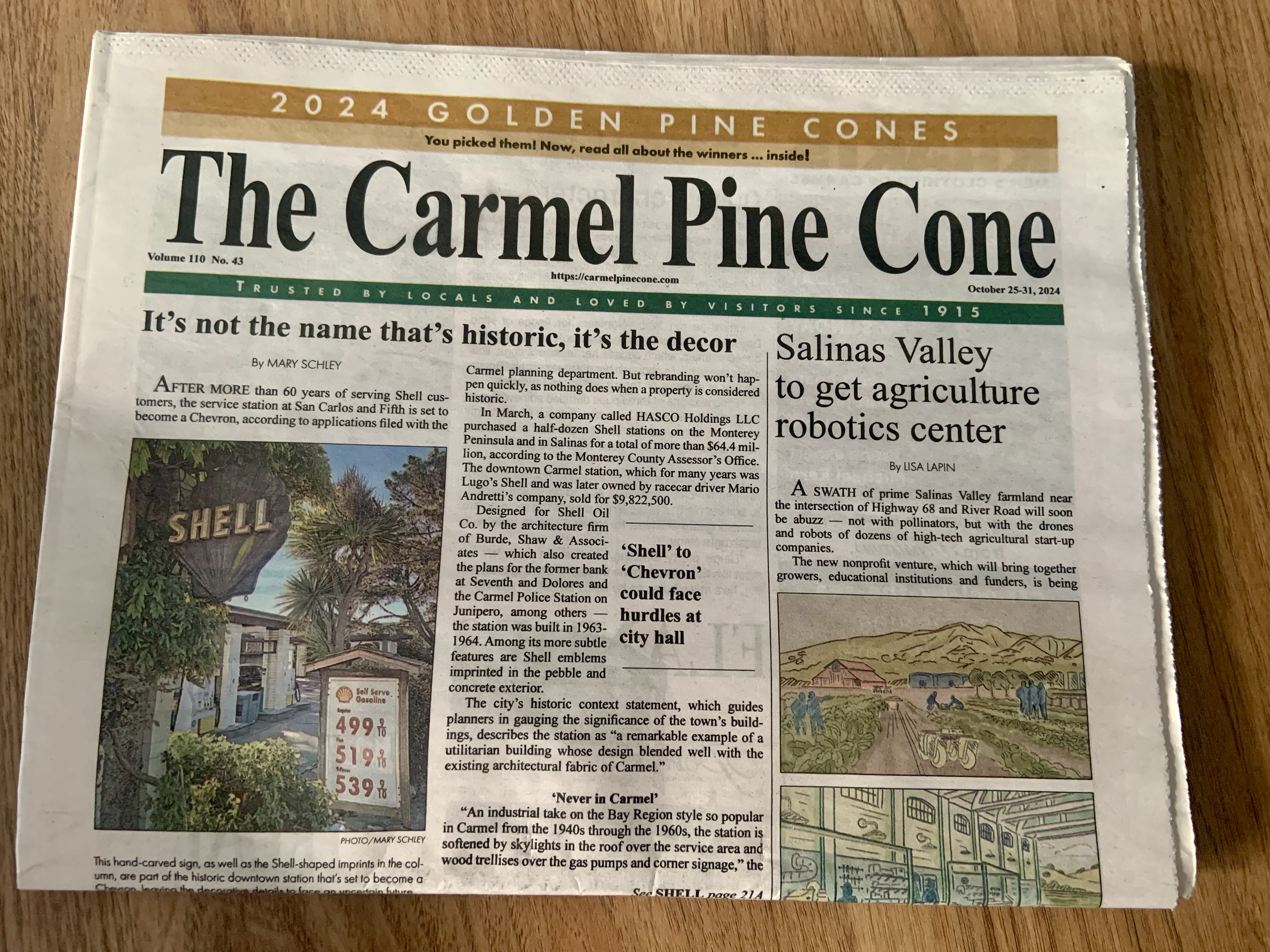
A copy of the print edition of the Carmel Pine Cone newspaper for Oct. 25-31, 2024.

Donrey Media Group purchased the Pine Cone along with the Carmel Valley Outlook in 1973. The company sold them in 1977 to Carmel Communications Corp, owned by Albert M. Eisner and his wife Judith. In 1982, the couple sold the papers, along with the Monterey Peninsula Review which they started in 1973, to brothers W. A. "Chip" and Bill Brown, of Oakland. The brothers sold the Pine Cone to Paul Miller and his wife Kirstie Wilde in 1997.

Miller, a former NBC bureau chief in Tel Aviv, paid $960,000 for the Pine Cone. At the time the paper was losing money and lost $100,000 the previous year. Under Miller, the paper turned a profit and became known for using harsh language and edgy headlines. Editorial content was described by one Los Angeles Times reporter as a "blend of hokey local features and aggressive news coverage and advocacy."

The TV show 60 Minutes did a piece on the Pine Cone after the paper successfully registered a fake person to vote. The segment aired on November 1, 1998. The Pine Cone also got national attention after interviewing Clint Eastwood following his infamous "empty chair" speech at the 2012 Republican National Convention. In 2015, KSBW reported on the paper's centennial.
