= Pacific Repertory Theatre =

Theater company based in California

Coordinates: 36°33′6.5″N 121°55′28.5″W

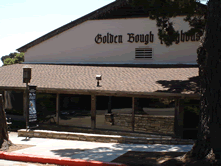
Golden Bough Playhouse, the main indoor theatre of Pacific Repertory Theatre

The Pacific Repertory Theatre, originally known as the GroveMont Theatre, is a non-profit year-round theatre company based in Carmel-by-the-Sea, California, United States. The company presents an annual season of ten to twelve productions, both stage plays and musicals.

Pacific Repertory Theatre was founded in 1982 by Carmel-by-the-Sea resident Stephen Moorer, who has served as its artistic director since 1983 (except for two years) and has also been its executive director since 2008. Kenneth Kelleher was artistic director from 2008 to 2010 and has been resident director since then. The company's main venues are Carmel's Golden Bough Playhouse and the outdoor Forest Theater. In 1990, the company reactivated the annual Carmel Shakespeare Festival. The company gained attention for its series of Shakespeare plays titled Royal Blood: The Rise and Fall of Kings produced over the course of four summers beginning in 2001. This series included the first productions of Edward III and Thomas of Woodstock in the US.

== History ==
=== Overview ===
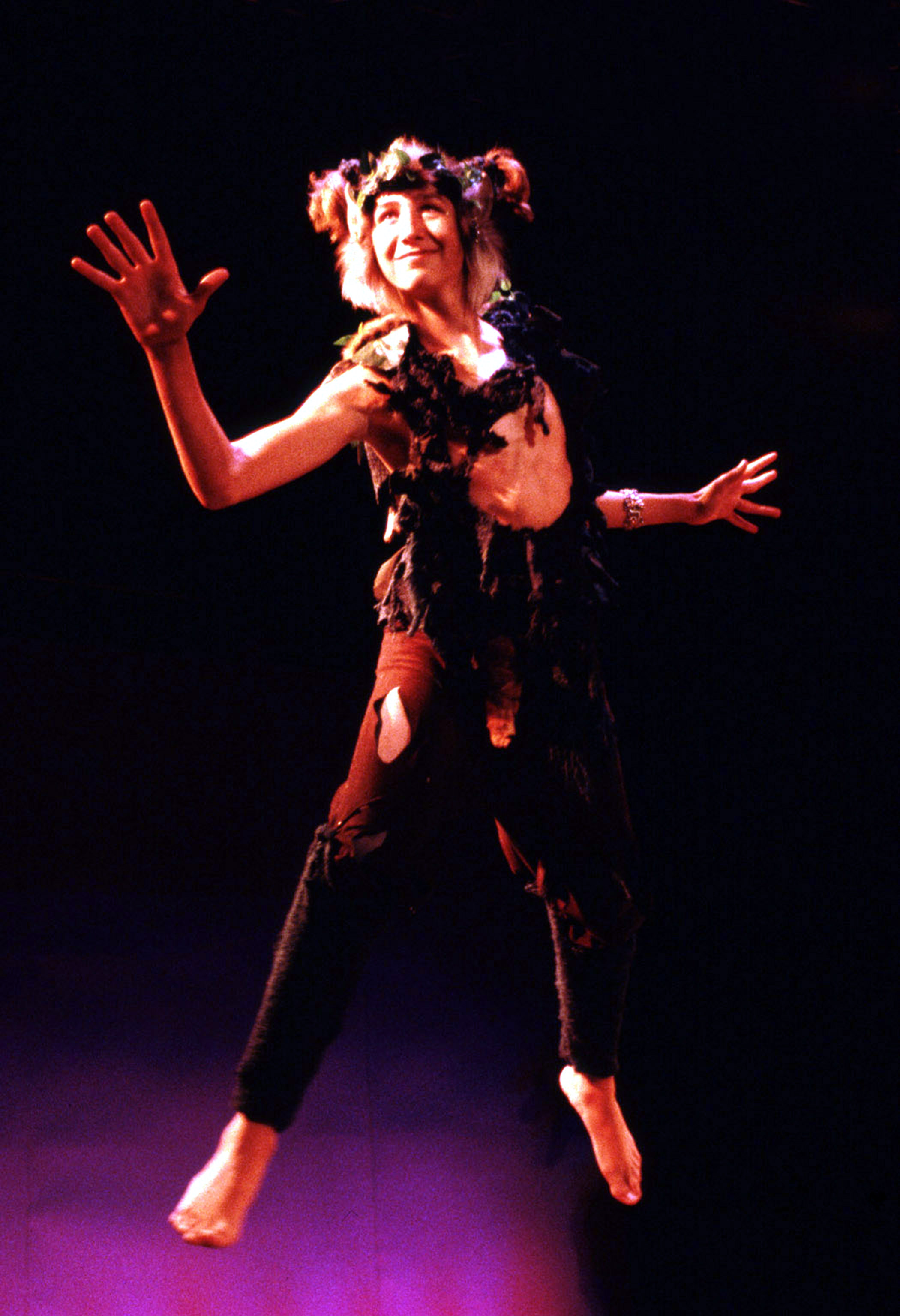
Vince Cardinale as Puck in PacRep's A Midsummer Night's Dream (2000) at the Carmel Shakespeare Festival

Pacific Repertory Theatre (PacRep) is a professional theatre company located in Carmel-by-the-Sea, California. It is the only professional theatre company located on the Monterey Peninsula. It is a member of the League of Resident Theatres and presents a year-round season of plays and musicals. The company stages its productions in three Carmel theatres: the Golden Bough Playhouse, the Circle Theatre, and the Forest Theater.

PacRep was founded in 1982 as GroveMont Theatre by Carmel-by-the-Sea resident Stephen Moorer, who served as its artistic director from 1983 to 2008 and has been its executive director since 2009. In the 1980s, organization struggled to survive, with a $4,500 annual budget and no permanent place to perform. It was then governed by a board made up of six friends. The organization's name changed to Pacific Repertory Theatre in 1994 when the company acquired the site of the Golden Bough Playhouse in downtown Carmel, and announced plans to establish a professional theatre for the region. In 2001, to facilitate an appearance by Olympia Dukakis and Louis Zorich in Chekhov's The Cherry Orchard, the company entered into an agreement with Actors' Equity Association. It is a member of the League of Resident Theatres.

The European Foundation for Quality Management studied PacRep in a case study on financing for non-profit organizations which was originally published in 2006 in Above the Clouds: A Guide to Trends Changing the Way We Work: a Project, and again in that works 2017 re-publication by Routledge. The Brookings Institution published a case study of PacRep as one of several in social entrepreneurship in the 2008 book The Search for Social Entrepreneurship.

In 2008, PacRep named Kenneth Kelleher artistic director and Moorer as executive director. For the 2009 season, Kelleher directed David Hare's The Blue Room, along with Man of La Mancha, Hamlet and As You Like It. In 2010, Kelleher became the company's resident director and still serves in this role, while Moorer serves as artistic director.

Between September 2021 and September 2022, 14 out of 20 board members of the PacRep resigned. Disagreements over construction resulted in a board motion to terminate Moorer as executive director, but a vote was never taken.

=== Forest Theater and Carmel Shakespeare Festival ===
At the request of the Carmel Cultural Commission, PacRep began producing shows in 1984 at the outdoor Forest Theater, staging Robinson Jeffers' Medea. In 1990, the company reactivated the old Carmel Shakespeare Festival (CSF) of the 1940s, playing in repertory at the Forest, Golden Bough, and Circle theatres, amidst growing interest in the Shakespeare Authorship Question. Since that time, the company has continued to stage productions at the Forest Theater every September and October, expanding into August by the 1990s. In 2000, it became the only professional theater company in residence at the Forest Theater. CSF has the largest budget of any of the California Shakespeare festivals.

Following the closure of the 50-year-old Children's Experimental Theater in 2011, the City of Carmel awarded the year-round lease of the indoor Forest Theater to PacRep for its educational program, the School of Dramatic Arts. In early 2022, the city of Carmel entered into a lease with PacRep for the nonprofit to manage the venue for the next five years, with a five-year renewal option; the company continues to mount its own productions there, alongside those of other arts organizations, and holds civic events.

Some of the plays staged at the CSF include Romeo and Juliet (1991; 1997), Henry V (1994), Julius Caesar (1994), The Taming of the Shrew (1995), The Merchant of Venice (1995), Cymbeline (1996), Henry IV, Part 1 (1996), Pericles, Prince of Tyre (1996), Coriolanus (1997), Antony and Cleopatra (1998), Much Ado About Nothing (1998), King Lear (1999), The Merry Wives of Windsor (1999), A Midsummer Night's Dream (2000 and 2007), The Winter's Tale (2002), Macbeth (2007), Troilus and Cressida (2008), and The Comedy of Errors (2008). In 1999 the CSF included a revival of Lee Blessing's Fortinbras; a play set immediately following the events of Hamlet.

=== Productions ===
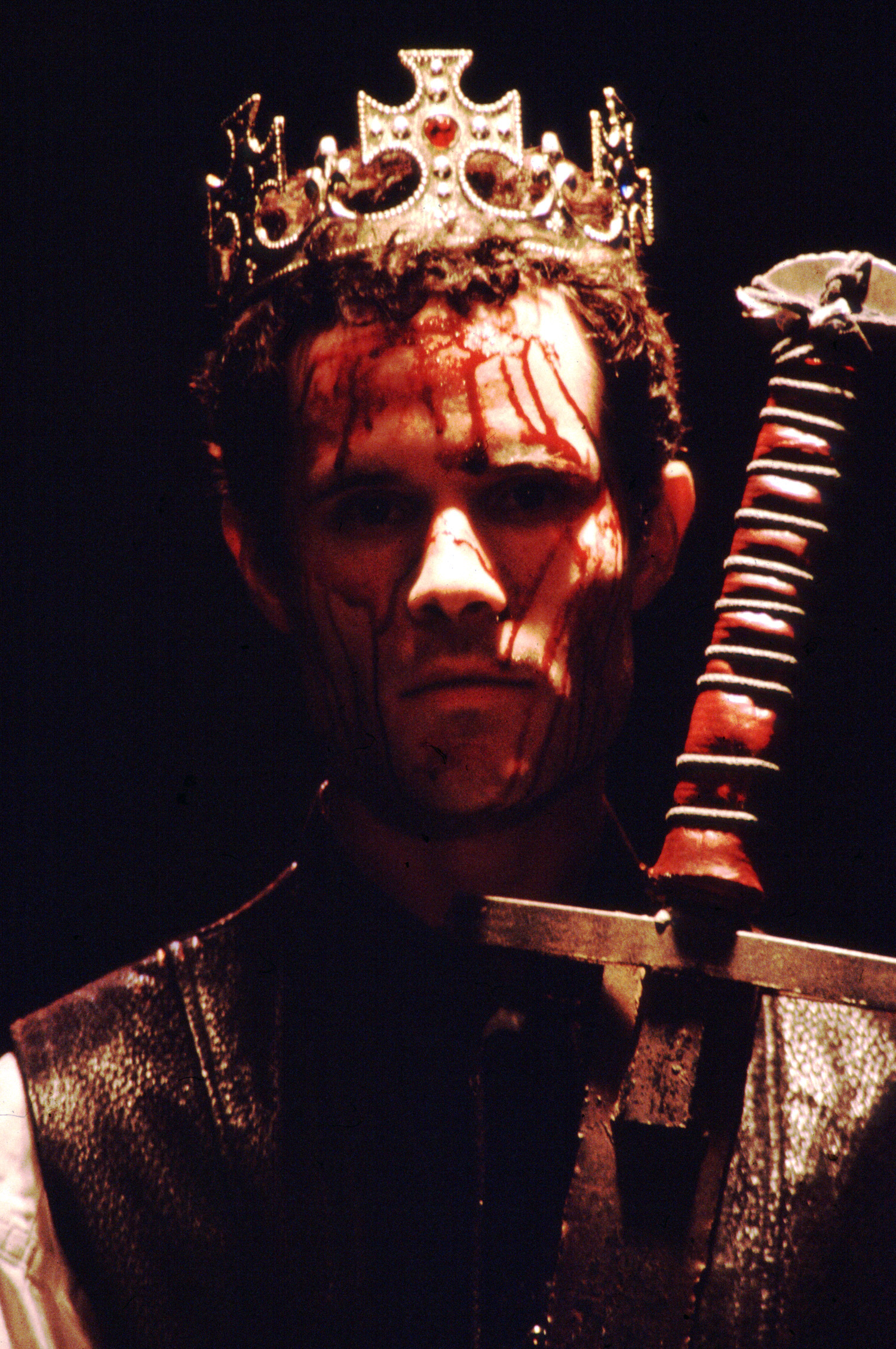
Edward the Black Prince (David Mendelsohn) in Edward III (2001)

In 1997 PacRep produced a revival of Jean Anouilh's rarely performed Ardèle. According to theatre scholar Amnon Kabatchnik, "the first major revival of Volpone in the twenty-first century was produced by the Pacific Repertory Theatre" in September 2000.

The company gained wider attention for its series of Shakespeare plays titled Royal Blood: The Rise and Fall of Kings. Over the course of four summers beginning in 2001, it presented all of Shakespeare's histories in chronological order. This included the first staging in the United States of the play Edward III (2001); the potential authorship of the play by Shakespeare is a subject of scholarly debate. PacRep also presented the first American production of Thomas of Woodstock in 2001; another play controversially suggested as being authored by Shakespeare. The decision to stage these plays alongside Richard II led the Shakespeare Oxford Society to hold its 25th annual conference in Carmel, California, so that conference members could also attend performances of these rarely staged works.

In 2003 PacRep continued its Royal Blood play series with Part 1 and Part 2 of Shakespeare's Henry VI trilogy of plays. That same year the company presented a revival of Euripides' Medea, which was the final production staged by director Joseph Chaikin before his death later that year. Also in 2003, the company revived Buddy: The Buddy Holly Story; a production that it repeated in 2004. In 2008, PacRep premiered Curtain Call by Gary Goldstein, who had won the Hyperion Playwriting Competition; a national competition instituted by PacRep. Some other plays produced by the company include Arthur Miller's Death of a Salesman (2006), Yasmina Reza's God of Carnage (2012), and Cyrano de Bergerac (2017).

Musicals produced by the company include Oliver! (1997; 2002), High School Musical on Stage!, Fiddler on the Roof (2012), The Full Monty (2014), Heathers: The Musical (2016), Shrek the Musical (2018), Chicago (2019), Mary Poppins (2022), and The Addams Family (2023). The company staged the comic opera The Pirates of Penzance by Gilbert and Sullivan in 2015.

In 2020 the second phase of a three million dollar upgrade to the Golden Bough Playhouse was begun. In 2024 the newly renovated playhouse re-opened with a PacRep production of Selina Fillinger's farce POTUS: Or, Behind Every Great Dumbass Are Seven Women Trying to Keep Him Alive. Other 2024 productions included the musical 9 to 5 and Kate Hamill's stage adaptation of Sense and Sensibility.

== Citations ==
=== Bibliography ===
- Brown, Ann Marie (2009). Moon Monterey and Carmel: Including Santa Cruz and Big Sur. Avalon Books. ISBN 9781566919951.
- Clarkson, Philip B. (1995). "Carmel Shakes-Peare Festival". In Engle, Ron; Londré, Felicia Hardison; Watermeier, Daniel J. (eds.). Shakespeare Companies and Festivals: An International Guide. Greenwood Publishing Group / Bloomsbury Academic. ISBN 978-0313274343. Archived from the original on 2017-03-18..
- Dickson, Andrew (2016). The Globe Guide to Shakespeare: The Plays, the Productions, the Life. Profile Books. ISBN 9781782832478.
- Dramov, Alissandra (2019). Historic Buildings of Downtown Carmel-by-the-Sea. Arcadia Publishing. ISBN 9781439666890.
- EFQM staff (2017). "The multiplication of not for profits". Above the Clouds: A Guide to Trends Changing the Way We Work : a Project. Routledge.
- Evans, Nancy M.; Evans, Neil A. (1998). Monterey Peninsula Exploring. Worldview Associates Inc. ISBN 9780963214331.
- Hartley, Andrew James (2011). "Shakespeare and Contemporary Performance Spaces". In Streete, Adrian; Burnett, Mark Thornton; Wray, Ramona (eds.). The Edinburgh Companion to Shakespeare and the Arts. Edinburgh University Press. ISBN 9780748635245.
- Kabatchnik, Amnon (2017). Blood on the Stage, 1600 to 1800: Milestone Plays of Murder, Mystery, and Mayhem. Rowman & Littlefield. ISBN 9781538106167.
- Light, Paul C (2008). The Search for Social Entrepreneurship. Brookings Institution Press /Rowman & Littlefield. ISBN 978-0-8157-5211-0. JSTOR 10.7864/j.ctt6wph39.
- Tumielewicz, P. J.; Lyons, Peg, eds. (2009). "Pacific Repertory Theatre". Summer Theatre Directory 2009: A National Guide to Summer Employment for Professionals and Students. Theatre Directories. ISBN 978-0-933919-69-3.
