= Constance Lindsay Skinner =

Canadian writer, critic, historian and editor

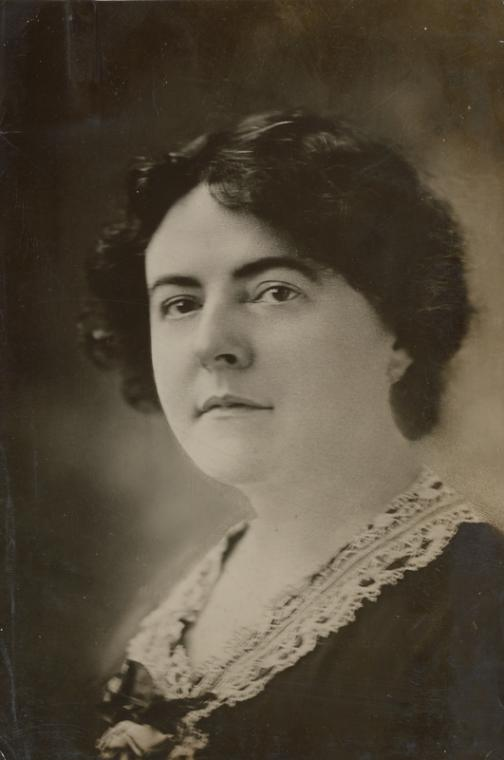
- Portrait of Constance Lindsay Skinner
- Born: December 7, 1877; Quesnel, British Columbia
- Died: March 27, 1939 (aged 61); New York City
- Occupations: author, editor
- Known for: Rivers of America Series (editor); Constance Lindsay Skinner Award of the Women's National Book Association

Constance Lindsay Skinner (December 7, 1877 – March 27, 1939) was a Canadian writer, critic, historian and editor best known for having conceived the Rivers of America Series for the publisher Farrar & Rinehart.

== Early life and career ==
Born Constance Annie Skinner on December 7, 1877, at Quesnel, British Columbia, Canada, to Robert and Annie (Lindsay) Skinner, Skinner later substituted her mother's maiden name for the middle name that appeared on her birth certificate. Her father was an agent for the Hudson's Bay Company.

In 1891, the family relocated to Vancouver, British Columbia. By this time, Skinner was already writing, completing her first published work, In Gelderland, during her teen years. In 1893, Skinner went to live with her aunt in California. While little is known of her childhood, much of the history and many of the novels and stories she wrote in later years were related to the northwest, Canada, and the gold rush.

Between 1902 and 1907, she moved from California to New York City, where she expanded her repertoire to include plays and criticism. She was a regular theater critic for the New York Herald Tribune. While it is unclear when her first novel was published, by 1917, one of her novels, Good-Morning Rosamond!, had been adapted into a three-act comedy and performed at the Shubert Theatre.

Skinner wrote and produced first theatrical production, David and Saul, a biblical drama under the direction of Garnet Holme of Berkeley, at the Forest Theater in Carmel-by-the-Sea, California on July 9, 1910. Reviewed in both Los Angeles and San Francisco it was reported that over 1,000 theatergoers attended the production.

== Rivers of America series ==
In 1936, Skinner became the architect and first editor of the Rivers of America Series for the publishers Farrar & Rinehart. In an essay published in the early volumes of the Series, she described the Series as being an exploration and interpretation of American folklife through the history, exploration, and flow of America's rivers. Originally conceived as 24 volumes, Skinner died March 27, 1939, from a coronary occlusion with arteriosclerosis. She died at her desk, editing the sixth volume in the Series, The Hudson, by Carl Carmer. The Series would eventually reach 65 volumes. Her papers are at the New York Public Library.

The Women's National Book Association's Constance Lindsay Skinner Award was named in her honour.

== Partial bibliography ==
=== Non-fiction ===
- Adventurers of Oregon (Yale University Press, New Haven, 1920)
- Pioneers of the Old Southwest: a Chronicle of the Dark and Bloody Ground (Yale University Press, New Haven, 1921)
- The Tiger Who Walks Alone (Macmillan Company, New York, 1927)
- Beaver, Kings and Cabins (Macmillan Company, New York, 1933)

=== Fiction ===
- Good Morning Rosamond
- The Noose (NY, 1920)(*short story; later made into the film The Green Temptation)
- The Search Relentless (Methuen, London, 1925)
- Silent Scot: Frontier Scout (Macmillan Company, New York, 1925)
- The White Leader (Macmillan Company, New York, 1926)
- Becky Landers: Frontier Warrior (Macmillan Company, New York, 1926)
- Roselle of the North (Macmillan Company, New York, 1927)
- Andy Breaks Trail (Macmillan Company, New York, 1928)
- The Ranch of the Golden Flowers (Macmillan Company, New York, 1928)
- Red Man's Luck (Coward-McCann, New York, 1930)
- Debby Barnes, Trader (Junior Literary Guild, New York, 1932)
- Rob Roy, The Frontier Twins (Macmillan Company, New York, 1934)

=== Poetry ===
- Songs of the Coast Dwellers (Coward-McCann, New York, 1930)

=== Plays ===
- Lady of Grey Gables (with Herbert Heron)
- David (produced in 1910 at the annual production at the Forest Theater)
- Birthright (written 1905, first produced Chicago 1912, first Canadian production Vancouver, 2003)

=== Articles ===
- The Golden Klondike and How to Reach It

== Sources ==
- New York Public Library: Constance Lindsay Skinner Papers, 1873-1939
