= James Franklin Devendorf =

American builder

Franklin Devendorf
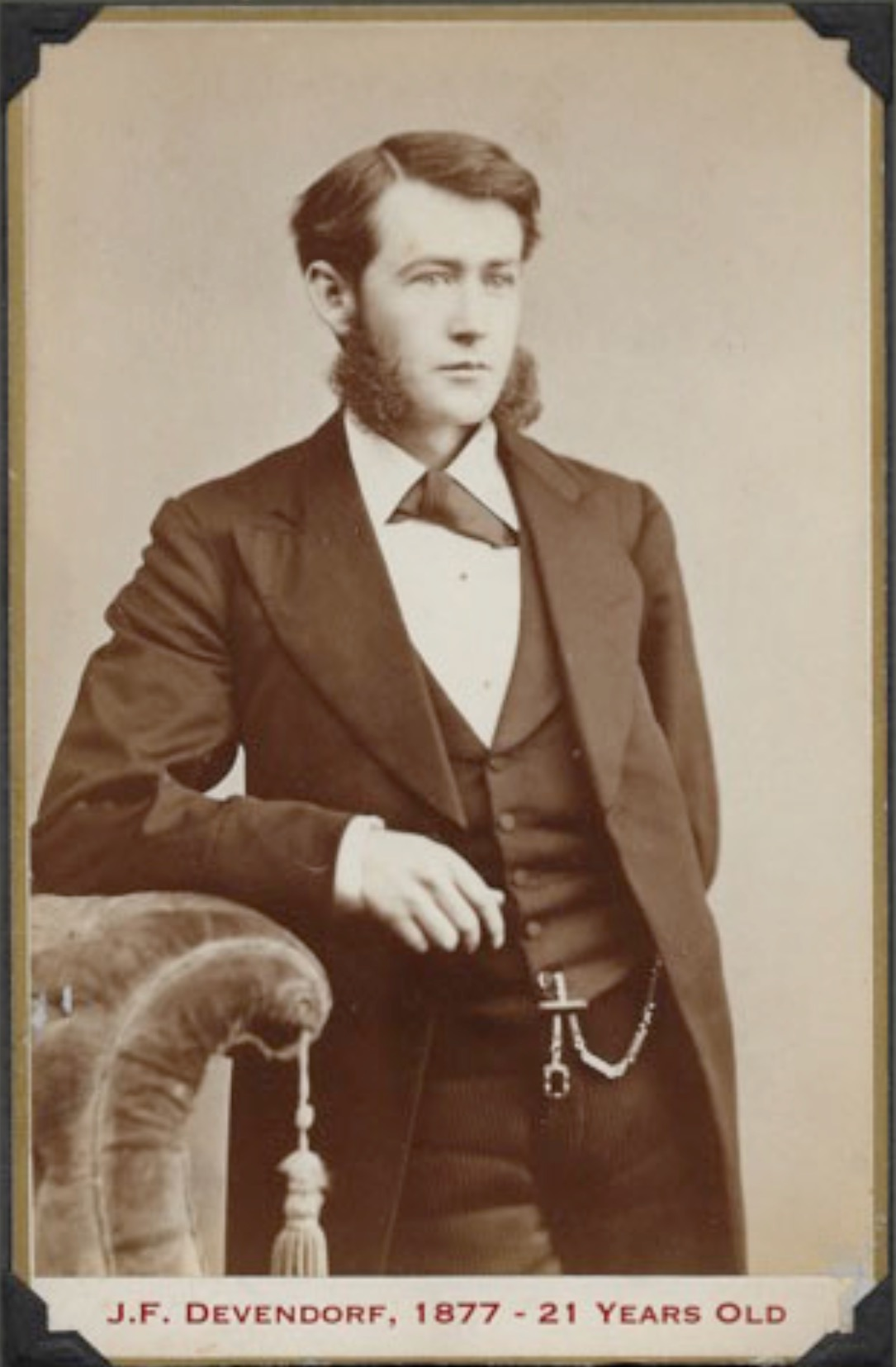
- James Franklin Devendorf (1877), 21 Years Old
- Born: James Franklin Devendorf; April 6, 1856; Lowell, Michigan, US
- Died: 9 October 1934 (aged 78); Oakland, California, US
- Occupation: Real estate development
- Spouse: Lilliana Augusta Potter
- Children: 5

James Franklin Devendorf (April 6, 1856 – October 9, 1934), was a pioneer real estate developer and philanthropist. Devendorf and attorney Frank Hubbard Powers (1864-1921), founded the Carmel Development Company in 1902. He became the "Father" of an artists and writers' colony that became Carmel-by-the-Sea, California, which included the Carmel Highlands, California. Devendorf spent the next 30 years of his life developing Carmel and the Carmel Highlands into a community of painters, writers, and musicians.

== Early life ==
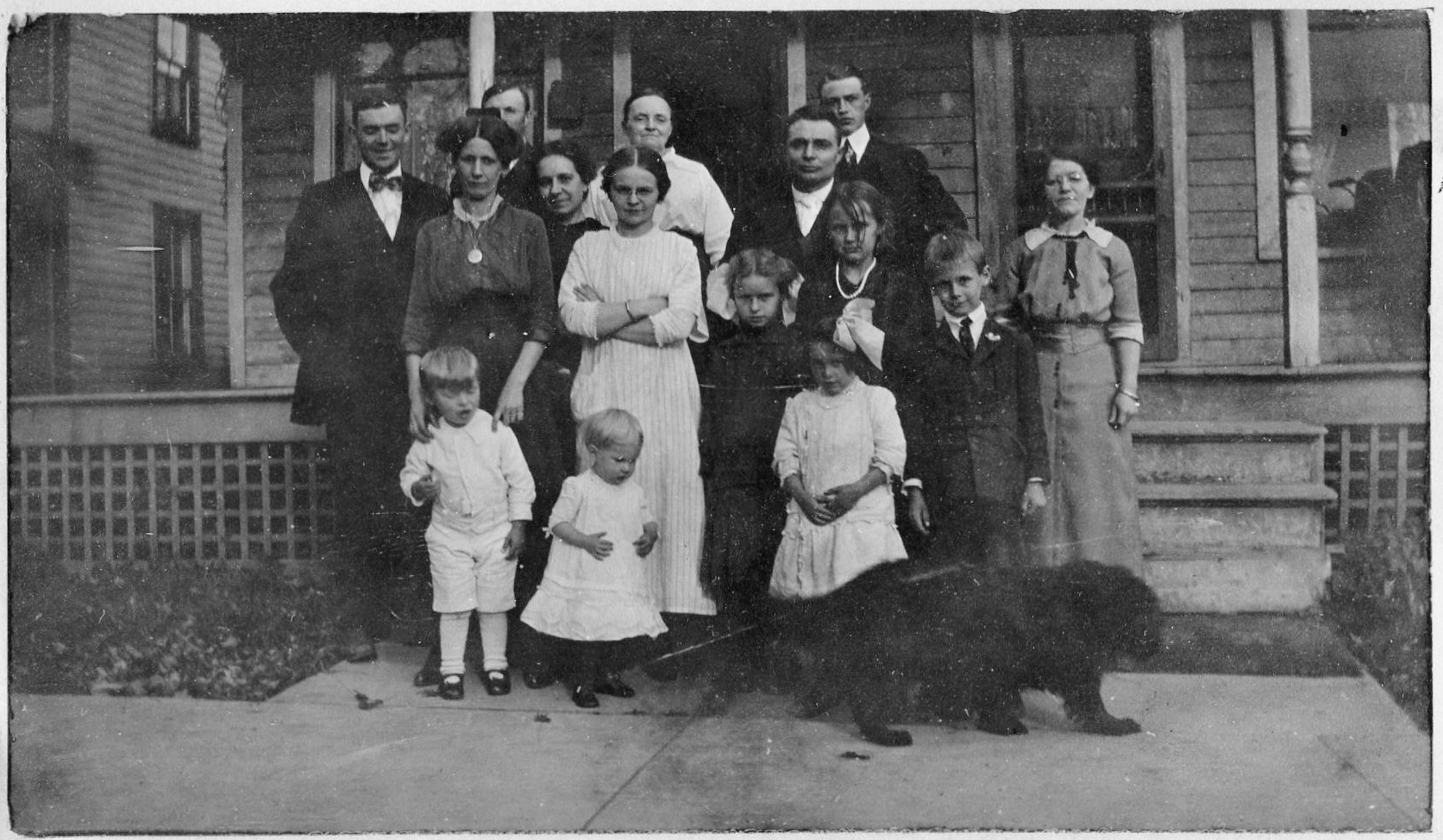
1915 Photo of James Franklin Devendorf and family members.

Devendorf was born in Lowell, Michigan, on April 6, 1856. He was one of the three children of Thomas Jefferson Devendorf a merchant, and Grace Congdon. Devendorf attended public school at Lowell.

== Professional background ==
In 1874, the family moved to California where he became interested in business and land development. He got a job as a clerk at Hale Bros. Department Store in San Jose, California. On February 19, 1879, in San Jose, he married Lilliana Augusta "Lillie" Potter (1859-1940). They had five children.

=== Carmel Development Company ===
Devendorf was one of the founders of the Carmel Arts and Crafts Club to support artistic works. In 1927, the club was replaced with the Carmel Art Association. He donated the site that would become the Carmel Forest Theater; and gave land for the Devendorf Park.

== Death ==
Devendorf died on October 9, 1934, at the age of 78, at his home in Oakland, California. His funeral was at his family home in Oakland.

== Legacy ==
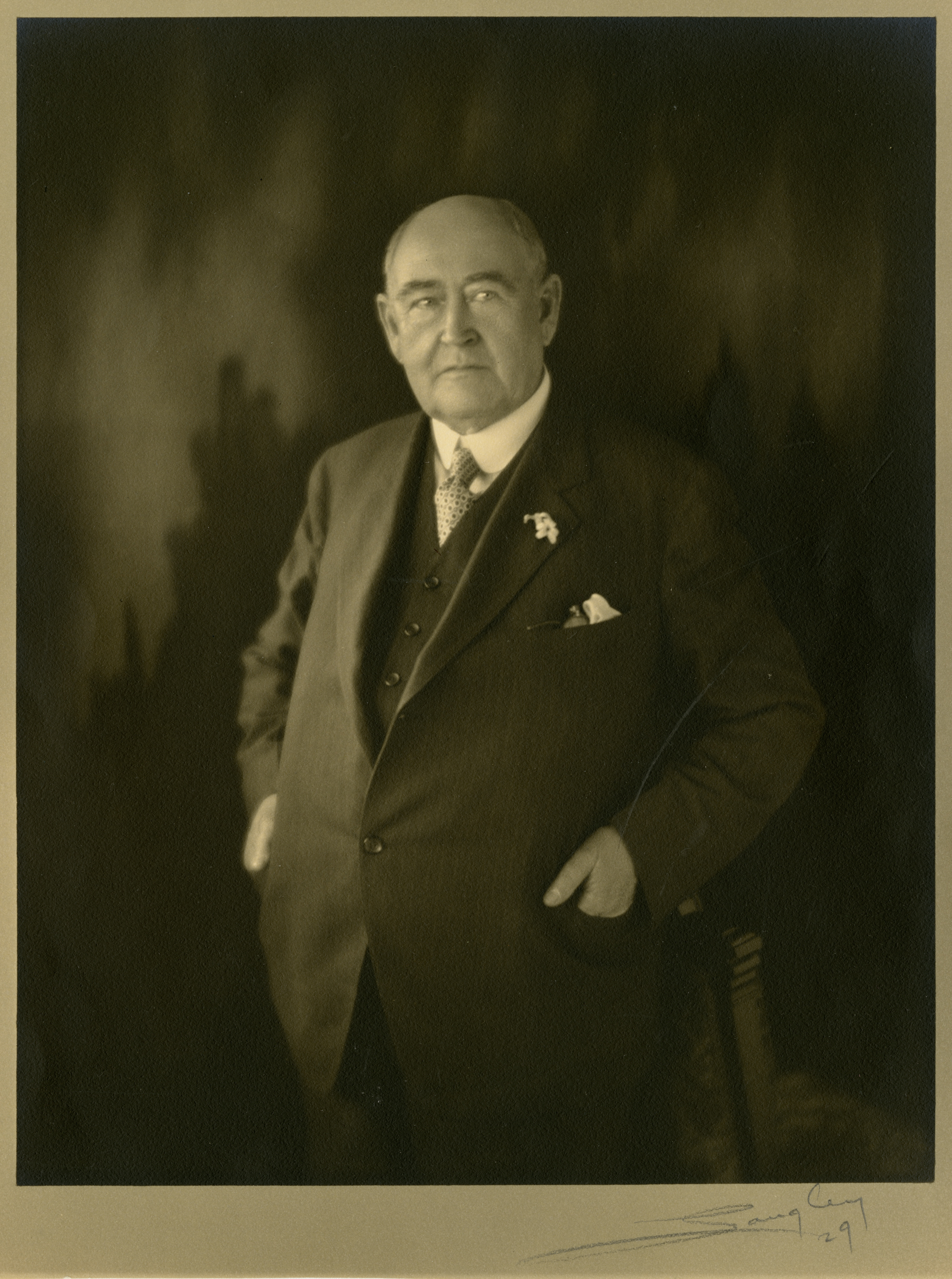
James Franklin Devendorf

The mountain behind the city of Carmel was named after him.
