= Carmel Bay State Marine Conservation Area =

Marine protected area in California

Coordinates: 36.5480°N 121.9387°W

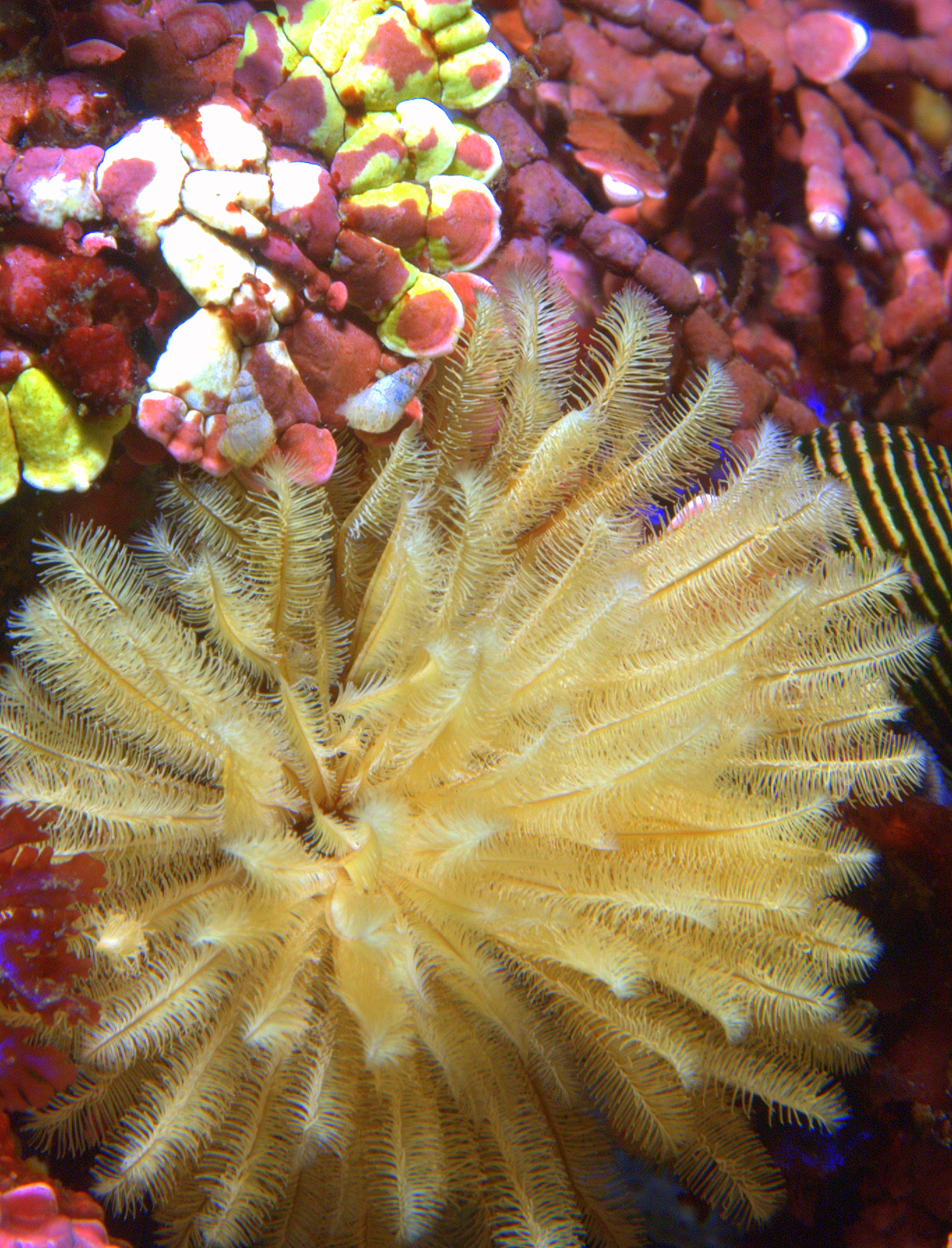
Feather Duster Worm - Lingcod Reef, Carmel Bay

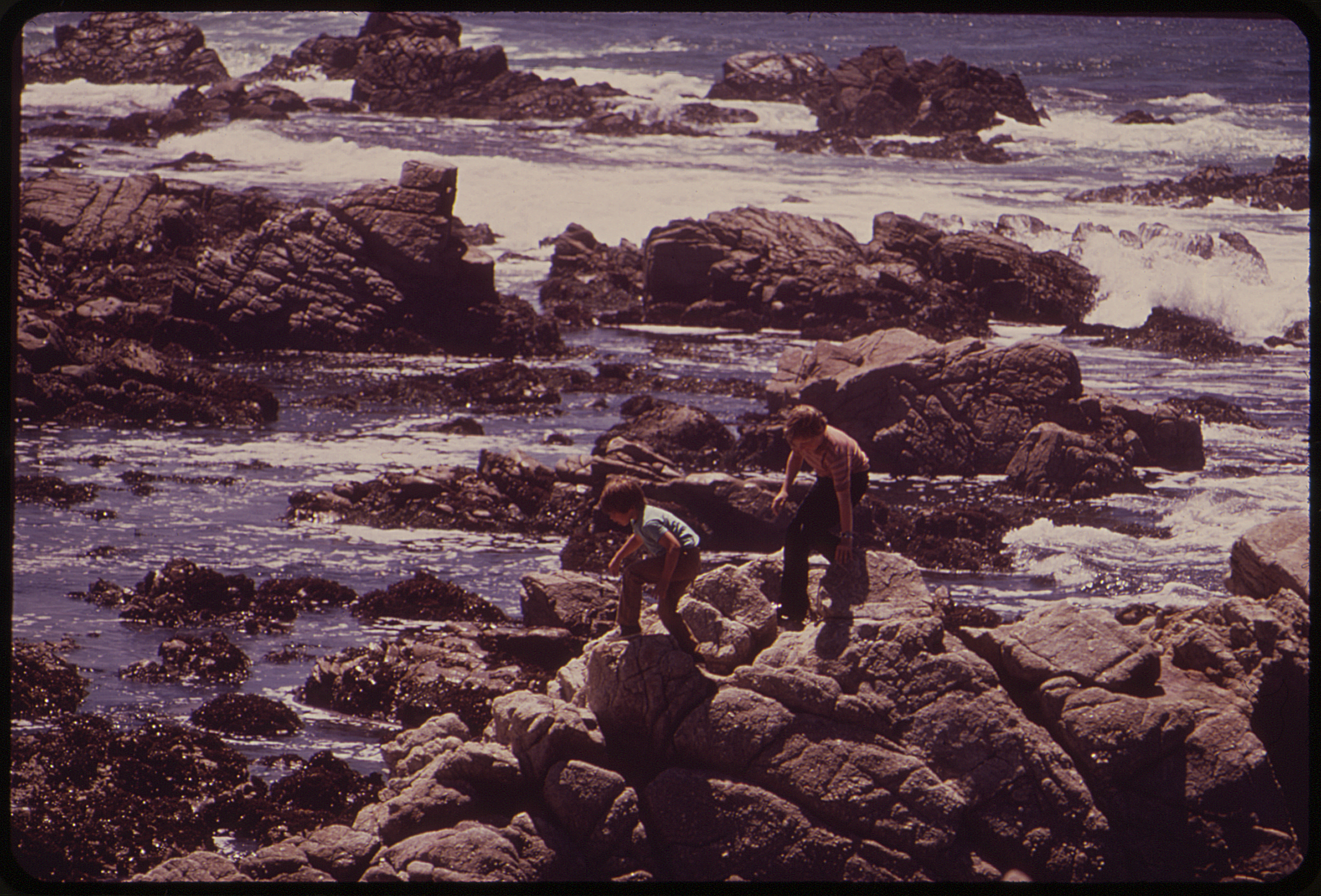
Carmel Beach

Carmel Bay State Marine Conservation Area (SMCA) is a marine protected area in Carmel Bay. Carmel Bay is adjacent to the city of Carmel-by-the-Sea and is near Monterey, on California’s central coast. The marine protected area covers 2.12 square miles. Recreational fishing of finfish and limited commercial taking of kelp is permitted within the SMCA.

== History ==
The Carmel Bay SMCA was established in September 2007 by the California Fish and Game Commission. It was one of 29 marine protected areas adopted during the first phase of the Marine Life Protection Act Initiative. The Marine Life Protection Act Initiative (or MLPAI) is a collaborative public process to create a statewide network of marine protected areas along the California coastline.

The Carmel Bay SMCA encourages recreational fishing opportunities in an area close to a nearby port by precluding commercial extraction or take of invertebrates throughout the Bay but allowing sport fishing for finfish from shore, kayak, or boat.

== Geography and natural features ==
Carmel Bay (SMCA) is near Carmel Pinnacles State Marine Reserve, Point Lobos State Marine Reserve and Point Lobos State Marine Conservation Area. On opposite sides of Carmel Bay are the only two extant stands of Monterey Cypress, Cupressus macrocarpa.

This marine protected area is bounded by the mean high tide line and straight lines connecting the following points in the order listed:

- 36° 33.65’ N. lat. 121° 57.10’ W. long.;
- 36° 31.70’ N. lat. 121° 56.30’ W. long.; and
- 36° 31.70’ N. lat. 121° 55.55’ W. long.

== Habitat and wildlife ==
Habitats protected by Carmel Bay SMCA include kelp forest, sandy beach, submarine canyon head, and surfgrass.

== Recreation and nearby attractions ==
Carmel Bay is a tourism and ocean recreation destination. Divers and kayakers are attracted to its unique pinnacle formations, granite reefs and kelp forests. Carmel-By-The-Sea also features an iconic white sand beach.

In nearby Monterey, the Monterey Bay Aquarium is a major tourist attraction featuring a 28-foot (8.5 m) living kelp forest. The exhibit includes many of the species native to the nearby marine protected areas. The aquarium also houses sea otters, intertidal wildlife, and occasionally sea turtles.

California's marine protected areas encourage recreational and educational uses of the ocean. Activities such as kayaking, diving, snorkeling, and swimming are allowed unless otherwise restricted.

== Scientific monitoring ==
As specified by the Marine Life Protection Act, select marine protected areas along California's central coast are being monitored by scientists to track their effectiveness and learn more about ocean health. Similar studies in marine protected areas located off of the Santa Barbara Channel Islands have already detected gradual improvements in fish size and number.
