= Bob Wartinger =

Former powerboat world champion (born 1945)

- Born: Robert Louis (Bob) Wartinger, Jr. May 11, 1945 (age 80); Carmel, California, United States
- Occupation: Racing driver

Bob Wartinger (born May 11, 1945) is a former powerboat world champion and the president of the Safety and Medical Commission of the Union of International Motorboating.

== Career ==
In 1990 and 1996, Wartinger received UIM Gold Medals for Sport, and in 2001, he received an International Olympic Committee Award for Significant Achievement for his work in developing international safety and test programs. He is a contributing member of the International Congress of Motorsport Science (ICMS). He has been the chairman of the American Power Boat Association Safety Committee from 1996-2007 and 2019 to 2021, and is a current member. Wartinger was a driver on the winning championship French outboard motor racing team at The 24 Hours of Rouen in 1998, and in 2004, 2005, 2006, and 2007 was a driver on the Russian team that won the 24 Hour Endurance World Championships in St. Petersburg, Russia, each year, 2004,05, and 06. Wartinger is listed in The New York Times and Strathmore's Who's Who.

== Racing experience ==
Wartinger has won 24 US National closed course and Hi-Point championships. He has set 139 national and world speed records (Kilo and Closed-Course). He is a five time participant in the 24 hour race at Rouen, France, winning the event with two French co-drivers in 1998. In 2004, 05, 06, and 2007, Wartinger and 3 Russian co-drivers competed in the 24 hour World Championship for RHIB boats in St. Petersburg, Russia winning World Championships in 2004,05,06, three times in a row. He has been inducted into the American Power Boat Association (APBA) Hall of Champions, APBA's highest racing honor, 6 times. He was inducted into the APBA's Honor Squadron for lifetime racing accomplishments and service to the sport in 2005. Wartinger has been awarded the UIM Gold Medal for Sport in 1990 and 1996.

== Awards and achievements ==
- UIM Gold Medal for Sport, 1990 and 1996
- International Olympic Committee Commendation, 2001
- Guinness Book of Records, World Outboard Speed Record
- American Power Boat Association Honor Squadron Induction, 2005
- American Power Boat Association Hall of Champions Inductions - 6 times
- USA National Powerboat Racing Championships 24
- UIM World Championships - 3.
