= Paul Blaine Henrie =

American painter

- Born: Blaine McKinley Henrie; February 4, 1932; Tampa, Florida
- Died: 18 October 1999 (aged 67); Newport Beach, California
- Known for: Landscape art Oil painting
- Patrons: Clyde and Pat Johnson Vincent Price, John Wayne, Frank Sinatra, Princess Margaret

Paul Blaine Henrie (4 February 1932 – 18 October 1999) was an American painter and illustrator who was known for seascapes and coastal scenes.

Henrie was born Paul McKinley Henrie in Tampa, Florida. He established himself in 1960 in the artist community of Laguna Beach, California, where he lived in a hillside home with his wife and child. Henrie later moved to Carmel, California.

Henrie became known for his watercolors and palette-knife oil paintings of California coastal scenes as well as exotic locales he had visited in Tahiti, Mexico and New Orleans. In works prior to 1962, his signature is "Paul Henrie" or "Blaine". After 1961, he signed them "Paul Blaine Henrie".

Henrie was criticized for "prostituting his undeniable talent" because he readily admitted to sometimes pumping out dozens of paintings only to maintain an expensive lifestyle. Henrie boasted he was the "fastest pallette in the west" and could produce several paintings in a day. He said he only did it for sale in tourist trap-type art galleries "when I need a load of bricks." He said, "It may sound crass, but when I hear the bell and see the carrot, I'm gone."

Henrie reserved his best work for his collectors and several prestigious galleries like the Grand Central Art Galleries in New York City. Notable celebrities who bought his work included Vincent Price, Frank Sinatra, Princess Margaret, and John Wayne (for whom he created a serigraph titled "The Duke" in 1979).

Henrie also illustrated two books for young adults, Legendary Outlaws of the West (1976) and Legendary Women of the West (1978), and wrote a how-to art book titled Painting in the South Seas.

== Later years ==
After moving to Carmel-by-the-Sea, California, Henrie made an unsuccessful run for a seat on the city council in 1988.

In May 1992, Henrie was arrested for selling more than 30 forged artworks that he alleged were done by Joan Miró, to a Monterey art shop for $42,000. It was ascertained that Henrie was the painter after his palm print was found in the paint of one of the pieces. Henrie only faced one count of misdemeanor forgery because authorities could prove only that one painting was his work. He pleaded guilty in October 1992 and was fined $12000 and faced one year in jail.
