= Argyll Campbell =

American attorney (1882-1945)

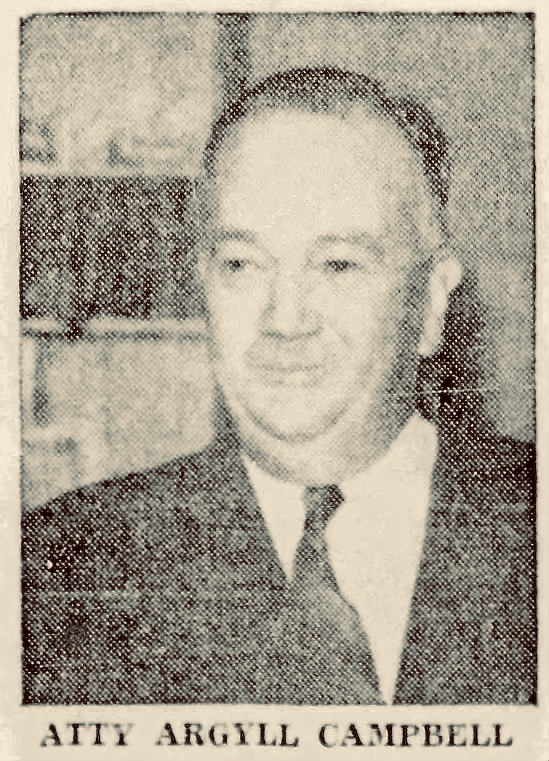
- Argyll Campbell (1882-1943)
- Born: Argyll Clarence Campbell; December 2, 1882; San Jose, California, US
- Died: November 24, 1943 (aged 60); Carmel-by-the-Sea, California, US
- Occupation: Attorney
- Spouse: Mabel Marie Phelps (m. 1909; died 1962)
- Children: 2
- Parents
- Military career
- Allegiance: United States of America
- Branch: United States Army
- Rank: First Lieutenant; Major
- Unit: United States Army Adjutant General's Corps

Argyll Campbell (December 2, 1882 – November 24, 1943) was city attorney for Carmel-by-the-Sea, California from 1920 to 1937. He was former chairman of the California Democratic Party to elect governor Culbert Olson.

== Early life ==
Campbell went to Santa Clara University and attended Northwestern University, but did not graduate. He married Mabel Marie Phelps (1880-1962) on July 8, 1909 in the chapel of Santa Clara college in Santa Clara, California.

== Career ==
=== Theater ===
Shortly after coming to Carmel, Campbell became involved with the Carmel Arts and Crafts Club and Forest Theater. On June 30, 1915, he wrote a column in the Monterey Daily Cypress and Monterey American, about the production of the four-act play, Junipero Serra, A Pageant of the Padres, at the Forest Theater from July 2-3, 5, 1915. He wrote about Perry Newberry as the director and producer of the play. They became good friends at the Forest Theater. Campbell was the director of dancing.

=== City attorney ===
He passed the California Bar Examination and opened a law office in San Jose. During World War I he joined the army, serving as first lieutenant and military law instructor at the Santa Clara University and at the Presidio of San Francisco. He became a major in the United States Army Adjutant General's Corps department.

Campbell served as city attorney of Carmel-by-the-Sea for fifteen years, from 1920 to 1937. He served as city attorney for Pacific Grove, California and Soledad, California and as deputy district attorney of Monterey County, California.

He was active in the affairs of Carmel's American Legion Post No. 512.

== Death ==
Campbell, at age 60, died on November 24, 1943, from heart failure, at his home in Carmel-by-the-Sea, California. Private funeral services were held in Pacific Grove. Interment was at the Monterey City cemetery.
