= Hubert Schwyzer =

American philosopher

- Born: March 16, 1935
- Died: June 22, 2006 (aged 71)

Education
- Education: University of California at Berkeley (PhD)
- Thesis: The Acquisition of Concepts and the Use of Language (1968)
- Doctoral advisor: Barry Stroud

Philosophical work
- Era: 21st-century philosophy
- Region: Western philosophy
- Institutions: University of California, Santa Barbara

Hubert R. G. Schwyzer (March 16, 1935 - June 22, 2006) was an American philosopher and a professor of philosophy at the University of California, Santa Barbara. He was known for his research on Kantian philosophy and social ontology.

== Life ==
He was born in Vienna, Austria, on March 16, 1935, to Georg Clemens Schwyzer, a physician, and Elisabeth Schuh Schwyzer. The family was Jewish but converted to Catholicism in the 1920s; Hubert only learned of his Jewish ancestry when he was in his twenties. They were forced to leave Austria nine months after the annexation of Austria into Nazi Germany on 12 March 1938. Hubert grew up in England and attended a Jesuit boarding school before joining the Royal Air Force, where he served from 1953 to 1955. He received a degree in philosophy from Reading University in 1958. In 1959 he moved to the United States for graduate study at the University of California at Berkeley, where he earned his doctorate in 1968. He taught at the University of Alberta for two years from 1963 to 1965, and then at University of California, Santa Barbara from 1965 until his retirement in 2002.

== Family ==
He was the father of Hugo Schwyzer and Philip Schwyzer. His first wife, Alison Schwyzer was a professor of philosophy at Monterey Peninsula College.

== Books ==
- The Unity of Understanding: A Study in Kantian Problems, Clarendon Press-Oxford 1990
