= Hugo Schwyzer =

American writer and academic

- Born: 1966 or 1967 (age 59–60); Santa Barbara, California, U.S.
- Education: University of California, Berkeley; University of California, Los Angeles (PhD)
- Occupations: Author, ghostwriter, blogger, former professor
- Website: http://hugoschwyzer.substack.com/

Hugo Benedict Schwyzer is an American writer and former instructor of medieval history and gender studies at Pasadena City College. A member of the feminist blogosphere in the 2000s, he received media attention for a number of personal controversies around 2013, leading to the end of his academic career.

== Family background ==
Hugo Schwyzer was born in Santa Barbara, California, to Hubert (1935–2006) and Alison Schwyzer, both of whom were professors of philosophy: Hubert taught at the University of California, Santa Barbara; Alison at Monterey Peninsula College. Hubert Schwyzer's family was Jewish but converted to Catholicism in the 1920s. His younger brother, Philip, also pursued an academic career, becoming professor of renaissance literature at the University of Exeter, England.

Schwyzer's parents divorced when he was young. He and his brother were then raised by his mother in Carmel, California, although he maintained a connection to his father. Schwyzer has described his mother as an ardent feminist who influenced his desire to teach courses on the subject.

== Academic career ==
Schwyzer studied history at University of California, Berkeley, specializing in medieval history. He developed a passion for this subject after seeing Derek Jacobi perform Shakespeare's Richard II. He attended graduate school at UCLA and was awarded his PhD in 1999.

His doctoral dissertation was entitled "Arms and the Bishop: The Anglo-Scottish War and the Northern Episcopate, 1296–1357," and dealt with the military role of the Bishops of Durham and the Archbishops of York during the Wars of Scottish Independence.

Schwyzer joined the Pasadena City College faculty first as an adjunct instructor in 1993 then in a tenure-track position in 1994. Over the following two decades he taught various history and gender studies courses at PCC, as well as co-teaching an interdisciplinary humanities course alongside English and psychology faculty members. Schwyzer began teaching gender studies courses in the mid-1990s. He was reportedly a compelling lecturer. In 2008 he was named the "hottest professor in America" by the website Rate My Professors.

In a December 2011 interview, Schwyzer described affairs with students that he had had in the 1990s—a topic that he had already written about on his blog, but now brought to a wider audience. This interview led to a swift backlash, which intensified further when critics found a January 2011 blog post in which he described a 1998 incident in which he had attempted to kill himself and his romantic partner at the time, who according to Schwyzer's account were both "in the throes of drug and alcohol addiction", by stove gas asphyxiation. According to Schwyzer's account, the attempt was ended after intervention by sheriff’s deputies and he was taken in for psychiatric questioning, but was never charged because his girlfriend's parents declined to press charges.

In February 2013, Schwyzer invited adult film actor James Deen to return to Deen's alma mater, Pasadena City College, to speak to students about his career. The appearance, initially open to the public, was restricted by college administrators due to "public safety concerns" over "protesters".

On August 9, 2013, Schwyzer tweeted a series of confessions described as a "meltdown"; this included confessions of sex with porn stars who had spoken in his classes. Black activist Mikki Kendall criticized what she perceived as white feminists expressing concern for Schwyzer's mental health. The hashtag #SolidarityIsForWhiteWomen trended on Twitter in response to Schwyzer's tweets.

In September 2013, Pasadena City College announced that it was launching an investigation of Schwyzer that could lead to his termination. By now, he had confessed to more recent affairs with his students, subsequent to the college's early 2000s adoption of a policy (written by Schwyzer) banning consensual sexual or romantic relationships between students and faculty. On October 1, 2013 he was arrested for driving under the influence following a crash in which another driver was injured. A week later Schwyzer resigned and the college investigation closed.

== Writing ==
Schwyzer began blogging in 2003. On his blog, Schwyzer wrote about his past struggles with sexual promiscuity, substance abuse, and mental illness; he has been diagnosed with bipolar disorder and borderline personality disorder. Schwyzer got sober in 1998. In 2010 he began writing for Jezebel, where he had a weekly column at one point. He also wrote for The Atlantic, Salon.com, and The Good Men Project, where he edited the sex and relationships section. He co-authored supermodel Carré Otis' autobiography Beauty, Disrupted: A Memoir, published in 2011 by HarperCollins.

== Later events ==
In January 2014, Schwyzer began working as a tax accounting assistant in Los Angeles. For several years he worked at a Trader Joe's grocery store. In October 2020, Schwyzer returned to writing with a subscription-based newsletter. Since 2023, he has written occasionally for The Federalist.

As of 2026, he is living in Los Angeles and working as a ghostwriter.

== Personal life ==
Schwyzer has been married five times (as of 2023, he and his fifth wife had separated) and has two children (both with his fourth wife). He is bisexual.
