= Carmel-by-the-Sea, California =

Carmel-by-the-Sea
- City
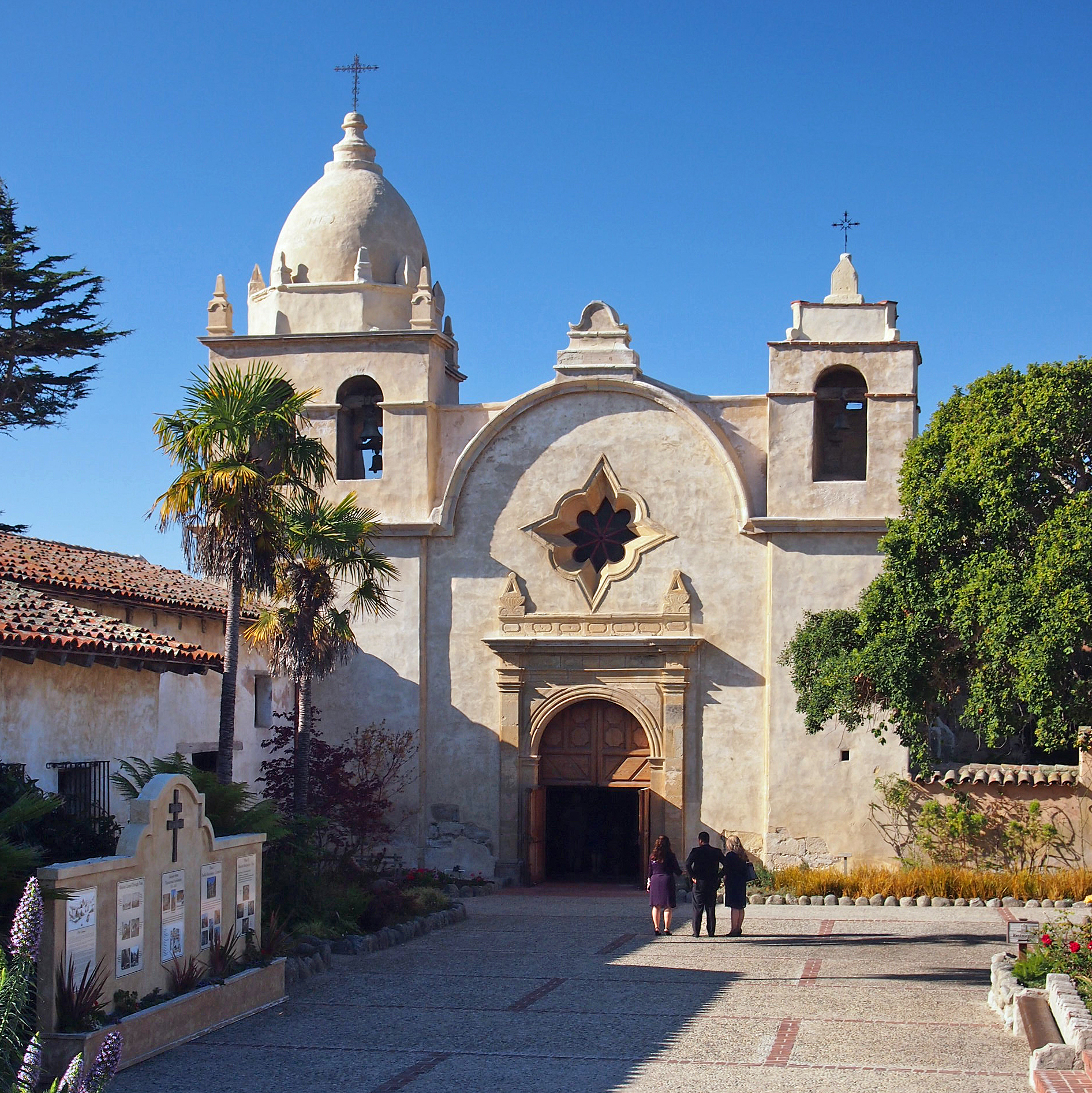
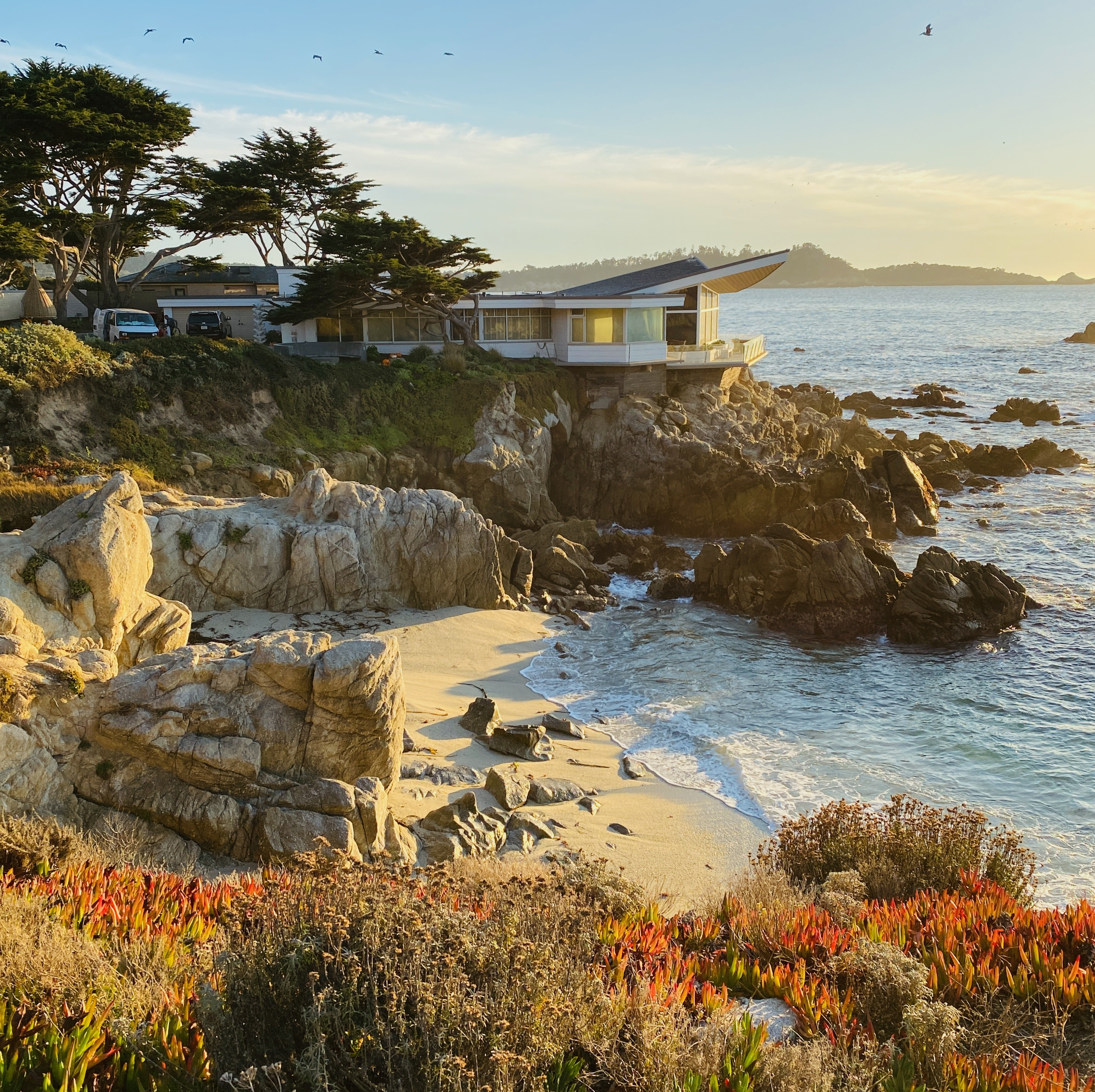
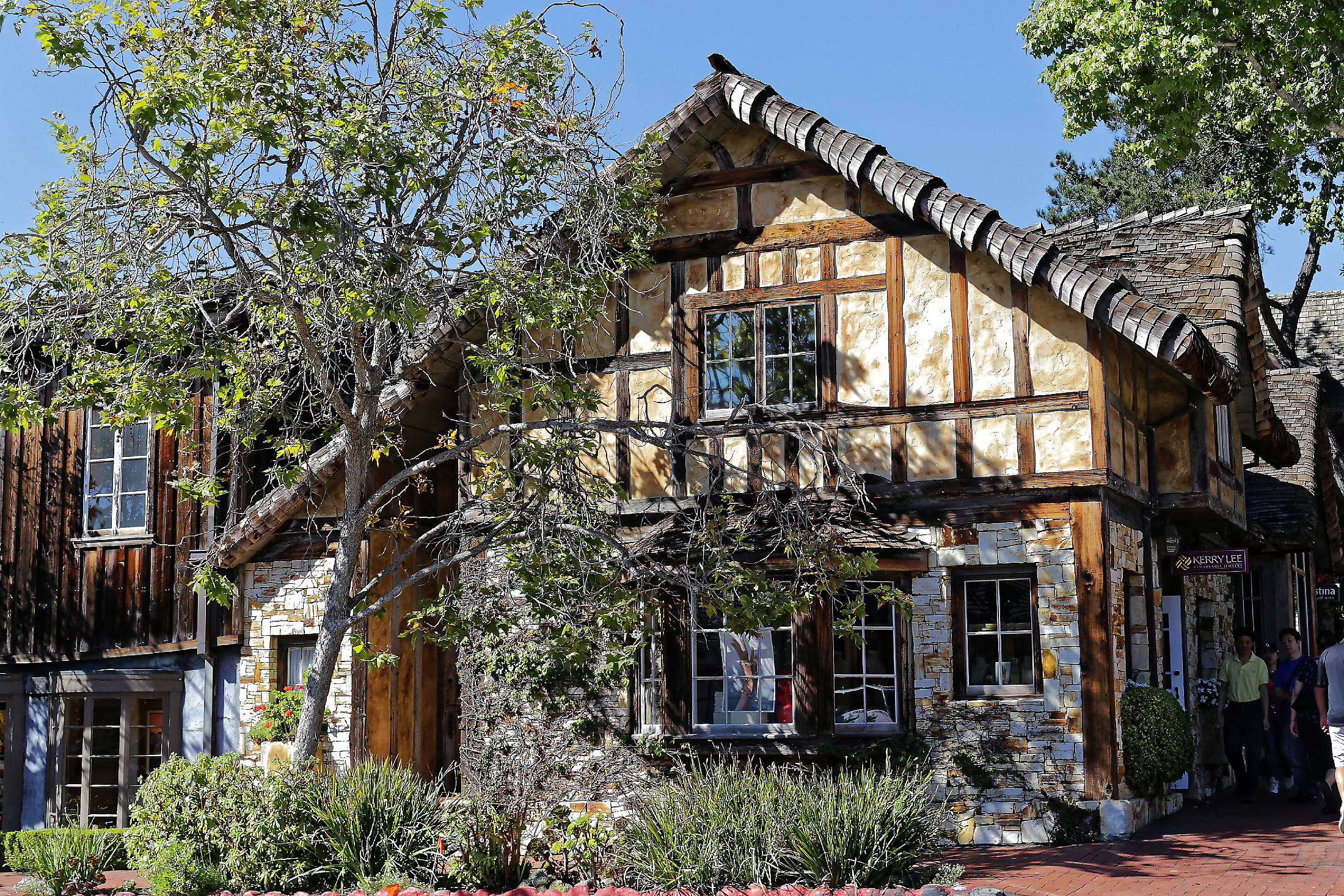
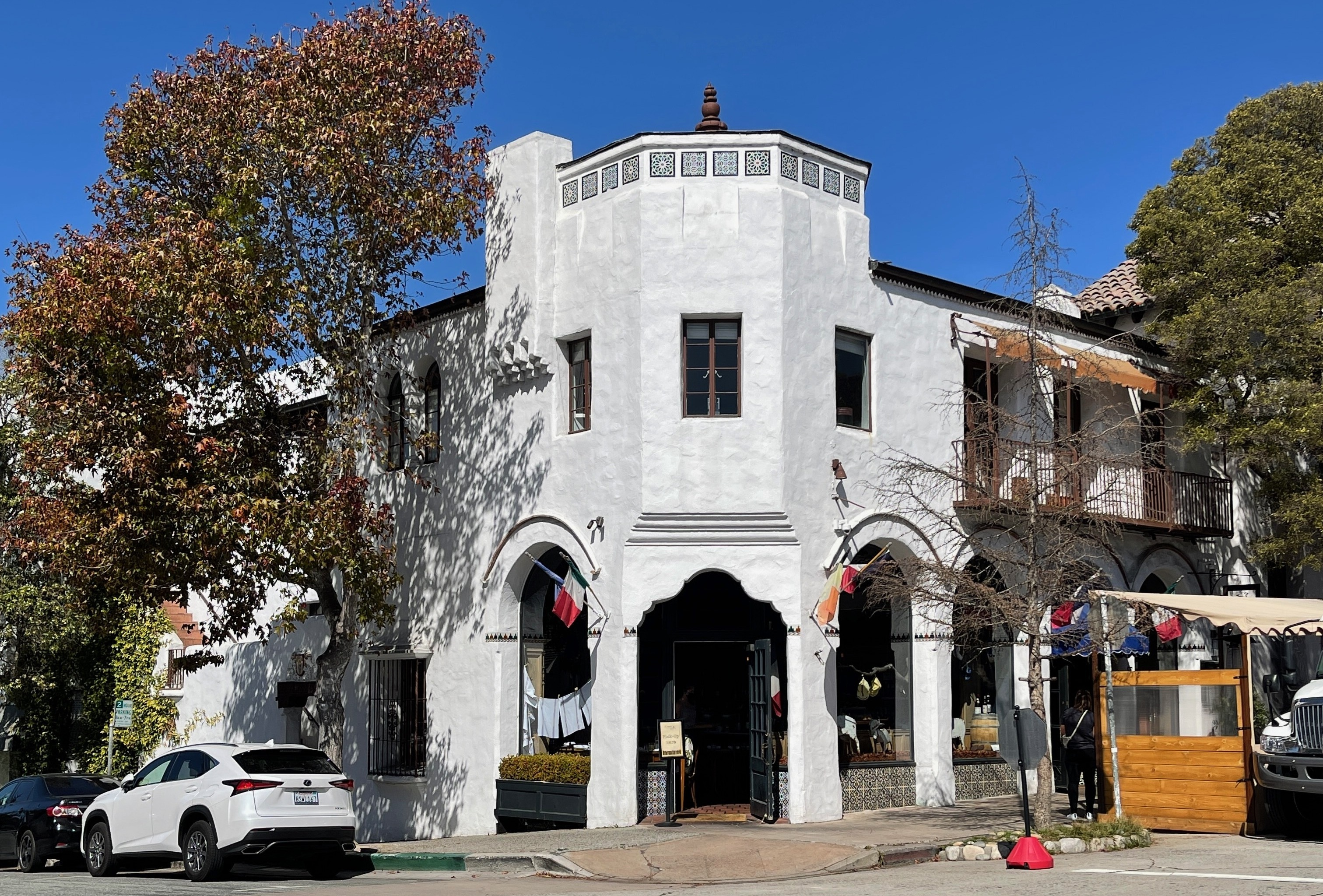
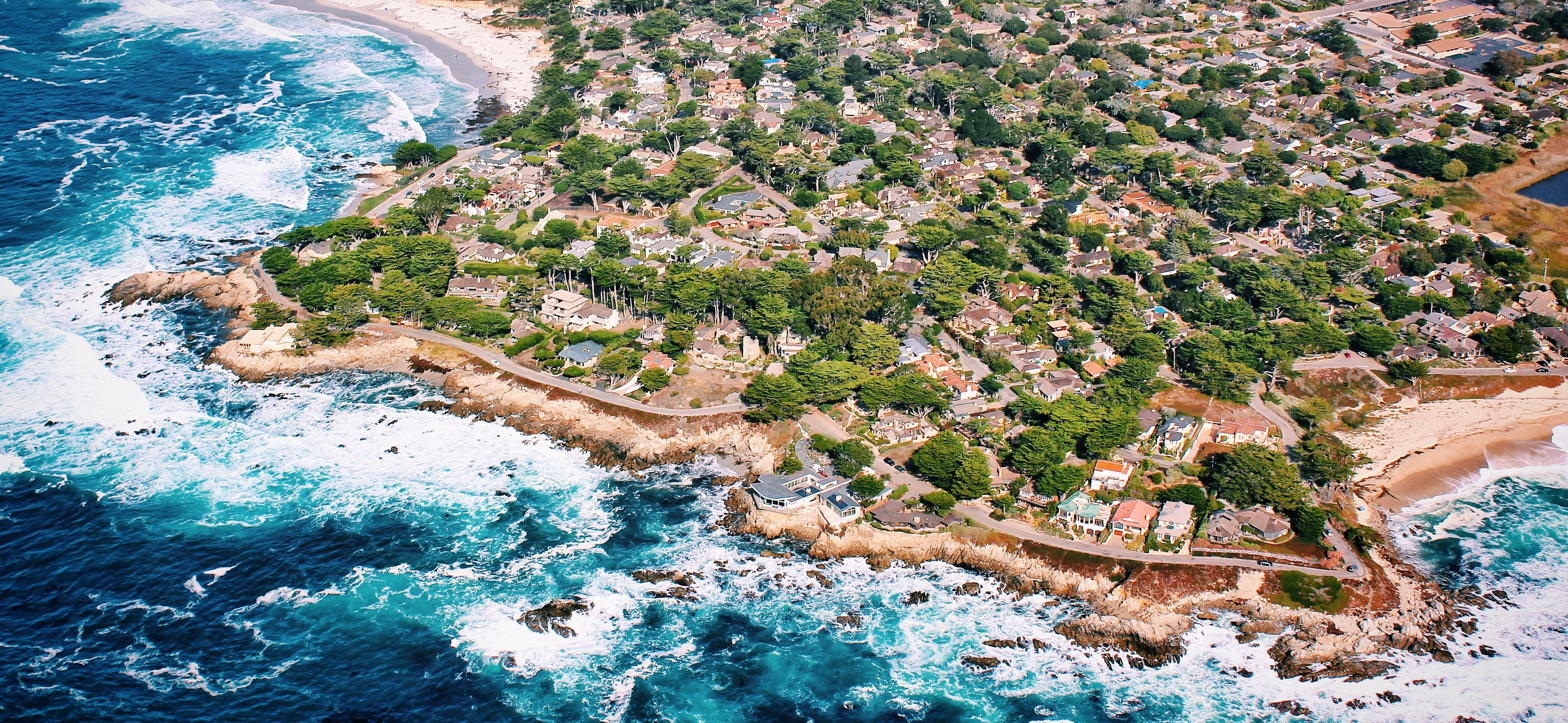
- Top: Mission San Carlos Borromeo de Carmelo (left) and Butterfly House (right); middle: storybook architecture (left) and Kocher Building (right); bottom: Carmel coastline

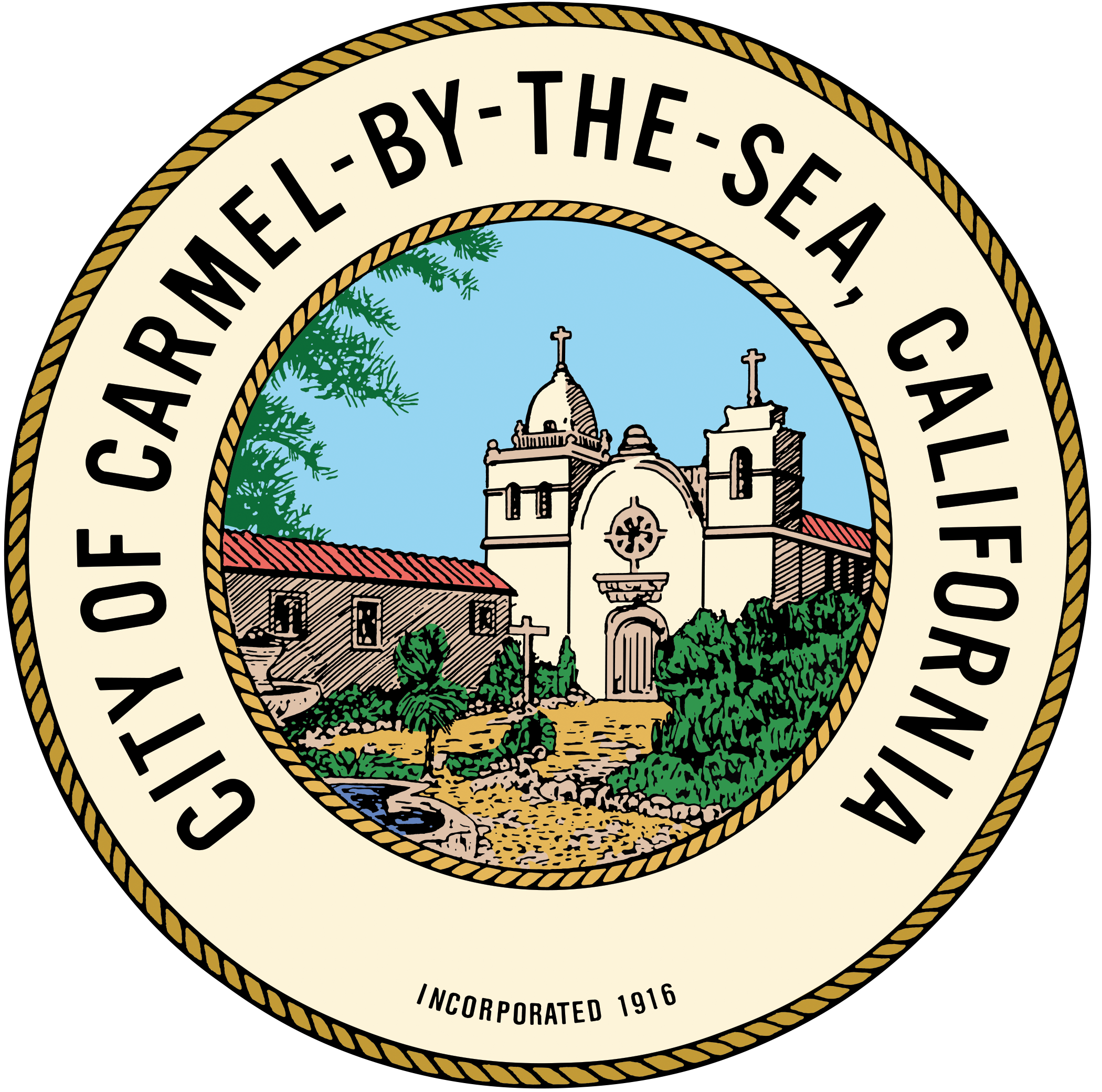
- Seal
- Interactive map of Carmel-by-the-Sea
- Location within California Location within the United States
- Coordinates: 36°33′19″N 121°55′24″W
- Country: United States
- State: California
- County: Monterey
- Founded: June 3, 1770
- Incorporated: October 31, 1916

Government
  - Mayor: Dale Byrne
  - State Senator: John Laird (D)
  - State Assembly: Dawn Addis (D)
  - U.S. Rep.: Jimmy Panetta (D)

Area
  - Total: 1.06 sq mi (2.75 km^{2})
  - Land: 1.06 sq mi (2.75 km^{2})
  - Water: 0 sq mi (0.00 km^{2}) 0%
- Elevation: 223 ft (68 m)

Population (2020)
  - Total: 3,220
  - Density: 3,034.1/sq mi (1,171.46/km^{2})
- Time zone: UTC-08:00 (PST)
  - Summer (DST): UTC-07:00 (PDT)
- ZIP codes: 93921–93923
- Area code: 831
- FIPS code: 06-11250
- GNIS feature IDs: 1658224, 2409987
- Website: ci.carmel.ca.us

Carmel-by-the-Sea (/kɑːrˈmɛl/), commonly known simply as Carmel, is a city in Monterey County, California, United States, located on the Central Coast of California. As of the 2020 census, the city had a population of 3,220, down from 3,722 at the 2010 census. Situated on the Monterey Peninsula, Carmel is a tourist destination, known for its natural scenery and artistic history.

The Spanish founded a settlement in 1771, when Mission San Carlos Borromeo de Carmelo was relocated by St. Junípero Serra from Monterey. Mission Carmel served as the headquarters of the Californian mission system, until the Mexican secularization act of 1833, when the area was divided into rancho grants. The settlement was largely abandoned by the U.S. Conquest of California in 1848 and stayed undeveloped until Santiago J. Duckworth built a summer colony in 1888. When the Carmel Development Company was formed in 1902, Carmel became an art colony and seaside resort, which incorporated in 1916.

== History ==
=== Spanish and Mexican eras ===
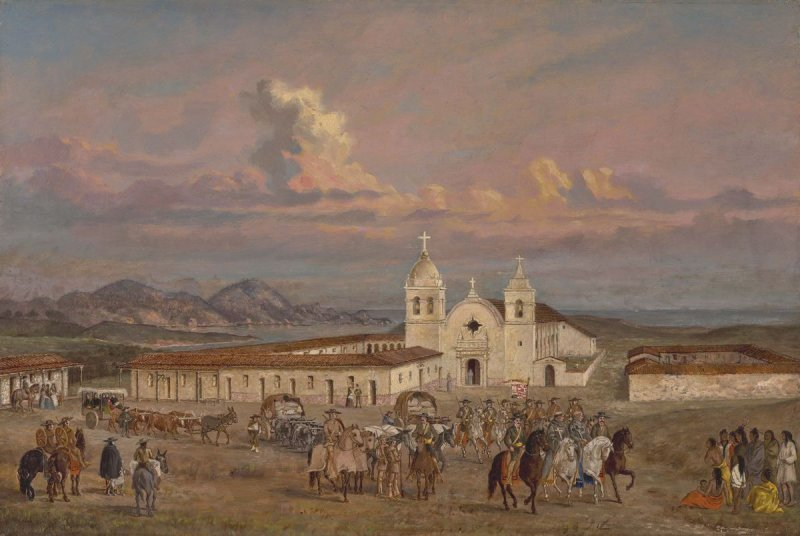
Mission San Carlos Borromeo de Carmelo, established in 1770, was the headquarters of the Californian mission system from 1797 until 1833.

The first Europeans to see Carmel were mariners led by Juan Rodríguez Cabrillo in 1542, who sailed up the California coast without landing. Sixty years later Spanish explorer Sebastián Vizcaíno landed at the Carmel River in 1602. It is thought that he named the river running through the valley Rio Carmelo in honor of the three Carmelite friars serving as chaplains for the voyage.

The Spanish began to colonize the area in 1770, when Gaspar de Portolá, along with Franciscan priests Junípero Serra and Juan Crespí, visited the area in search of a mission site. Portolà and Crespí traveled by land while Serra traveled with supplies aboard ship, arriving eight days later. The colony of Monterey was established at the same time as the second mission in Alta California and soon became the capital of California, remaining so until 1849. From the late 18th through the early 19th century most of the Ohlone population died from European diseases (against which they had no immunity), as well as overwork and malnutrition at the missions where the Spanish forced them to live.

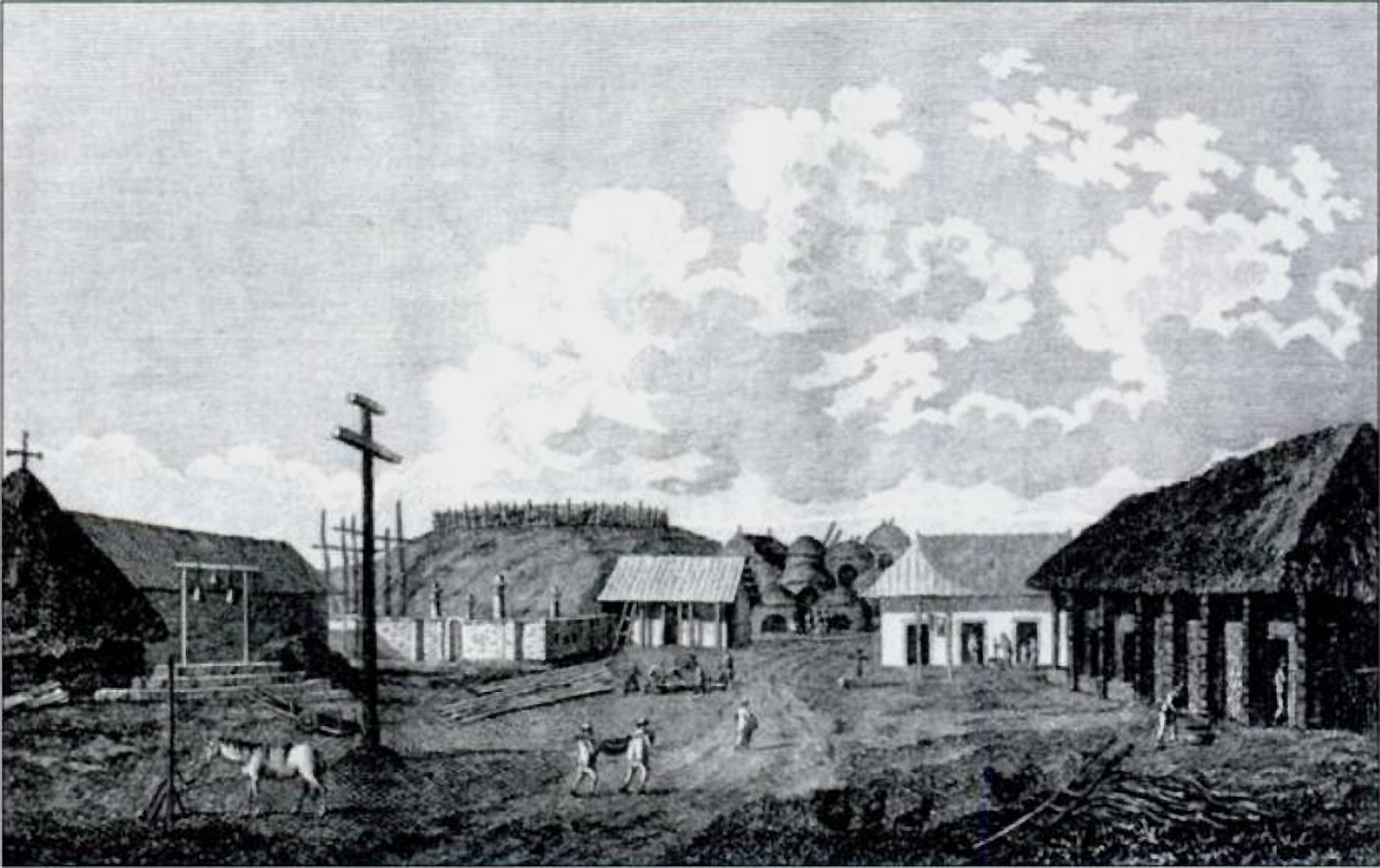
The village of Carmel in 1794

Mission San Carlos Borromeo de Carmelo was founded on June 3, 1770, in the nearby settlement of Monterey, but was relocated to Carmel Valley by Junípero Serra due to interactions between soldiers stationed at the nearby Presidio and the native Indians.

In December 1771, a stockade of approximately 130×200 feet became the new Mission Carmel. Simple buildings made of plastered mud served as the first church and dwellings until a structure was built of wood from nearby pine and cypress trees to withstand the seasonal rains. This was also a temporary church until a permanent stone building was constructed. In 1784, Serra died and was buried, at his request, at the Mission in the Sanctuary of the San Carlos Church, next to Crespí, who had died the previous year. Serra was buried with full military honors. Carmel Mission contains the state's first library.

When Mexico gained independence from Spain in 1821, Carmel became Mexican territory.

=== Early American era ===
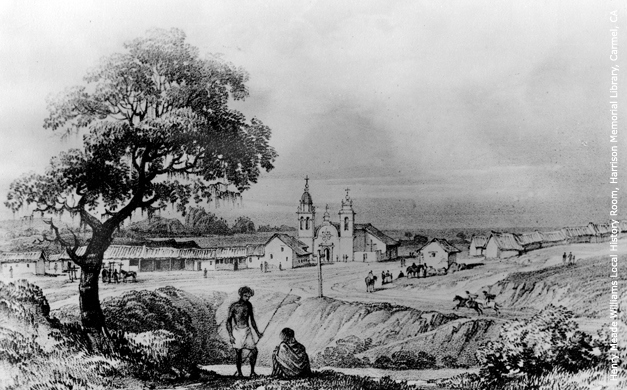
Mission San Carlos in 1839

Carmel became part of the United States in 1848, when Mexico ceded California as a result of the Mexican–American War. In the 1850s, "Rancho Las Manzanitas", the area that was to become Carmel-by-the-Sea, was purchased by French businessman Honoré Escolle. Escolle, well known and prosperous in the City of Monterey, owned the first commercial bakery, pottery kiln and brickworks in Central California.

William Martin of Scotland arrived in Monterey in 1856 by ship with his family. His son, John Martin (1827–1893), bought land around the Carmel River from Lafayette F. Loveland in 1859. He built the Martin Ranch on 216 acres (87 ha) that went as far as the Carmel River to the homes along Carmel-by-the-Sea. The ranch became known as the Mission Ranch because it was so close to the Carmel Mission. They farmed potatoes and barley and had a milk dairy.

In 1888, Escolle and Santiago J. Duckworth filed a subdivision map with the County Recorder of Monterey County. By 1889, 200 lots had been sold. The name "Carmel" was earlier applied to another place on the north bank of the Carmel River 13 miles (21 km) east-southeast of the present-day Carmel. A post office called Carmel opened in 1889, closed in 1890, re-opened in 1893, moved in 1902, and closed for good in 1903. Abbie Jane Hunter, founder of the San Francisco-based Women's Real Estate Investment Company, first used the name "Carmel-by-the-Sea" on a promotional postcard.

=== Modern era ===
In 1902, James Franklin Devendorf and Frank Hubbard Powers, on behalf of the Carmel Development Company, filed a subdivision map of the core village that became Carmel. They asked Michael J. Murphy to help build the houses. From 1902 to 1940, he built nearly 350 buildings in Carmel. The Carmel post office opened the same year. In 1899, Fritz Schweninger opened the first bakery on Ocean Avenue, called the Carmel Bakery. In 1910, the Carnegie Institution established the Coastal Laboratory, and a number of scientists moved to the area.

In 1905, the Carmel Arts and Crafts Club was formed to support and produce artistic works. Following the 1906 San Francisco earthquake, an influx of artists, writers, musicians and other creative people escaped the disaster for Carmel. The new residents were offered home lots with a ten-dollar down payment, little or no interest, and whatever they could afford to pay monthly. In 1906, the San Francisco Call devoted a full page to the "artists, writers and poets at Carmel-by-the-Sea."

The Carmel Arts and Crafts Club held exhibitions, lectures, dances, and produced plays and recitals at numerous locations, including the Pine Inn Hotel, before purchasing a lot on Casanova Street, where they built a clubhouse in 1907. By 1914, the club had achieved national recognition.

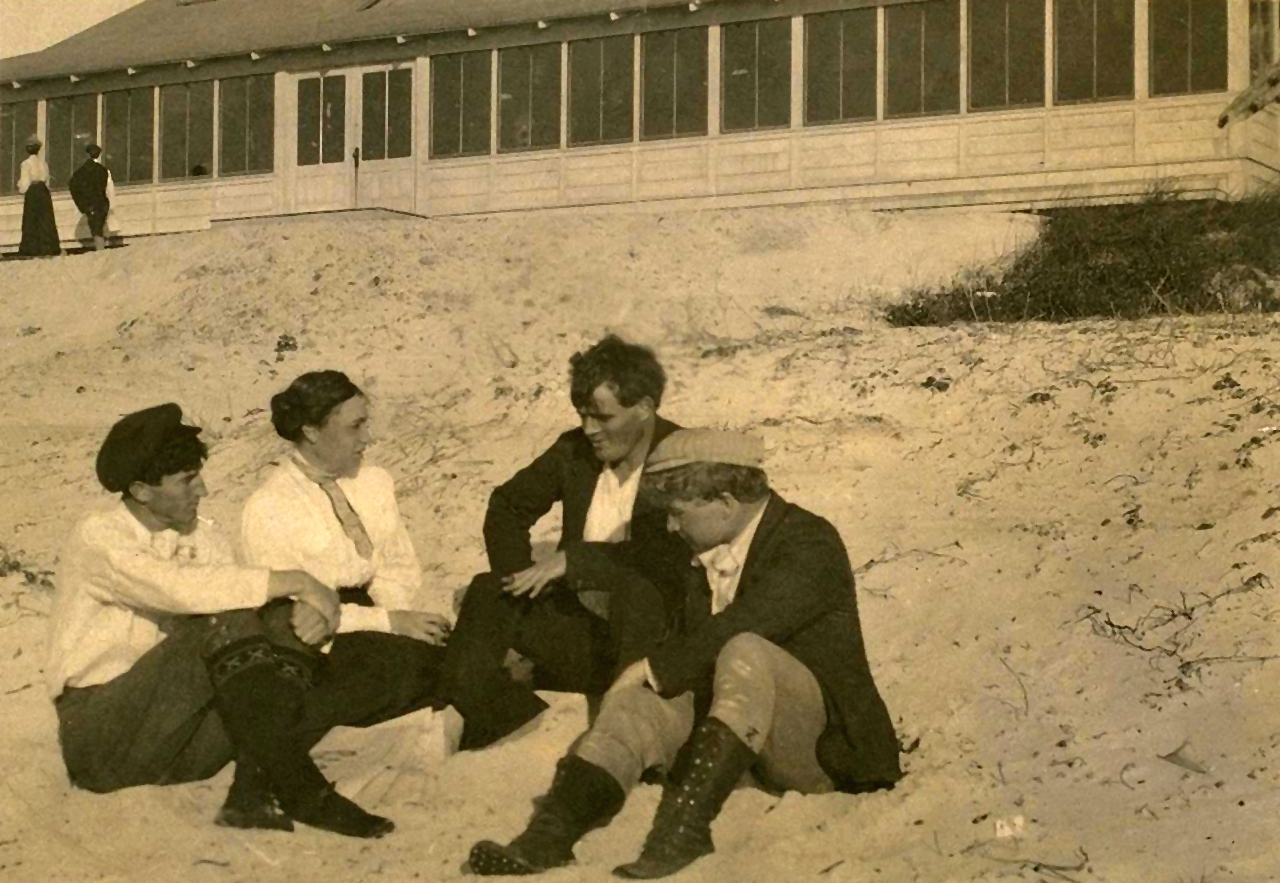
Carmel became a hub for artists and writers in the early 1900s. Pictured are George Sterling, Mary Austin, Jack London, and Jimmie Hopper at Carmel Beach, c. 1905.

In 1911, Carmel began a tradition of presenting plays by Shakespeare with a production of Twelfth Night, directed by Garnet Holme of UC Berkeley and featuring future mayors Perry Newberry and Herbert Heron. Twelfth Night was again presented in 1940 at Heron's inaugural Carmel Shakespeare Festival, and was repeated in 1942 and 1956.

In 1915, during the Panama–Pacific International Exposition in San Francisco, various items showcasing Carmel were featured in the Monterey County exhibit within the California Building. This exhibit included natural and industrial products of this part of the state. As part of Carmel's involvement in the Exposition, the Junipero Serra or The Padres performance from the Forest Theater took place on July 30–31, 1915, within the Court of the Universe. This pageant, written and directed by Perry Newberry, was a tribute to Father Junipero Serra and featured prominent citizens of Carmel in its cast, such as Frederick R. Bechdolt and Grant Wallace. Around twenty-five thousand individuals attended these performances.

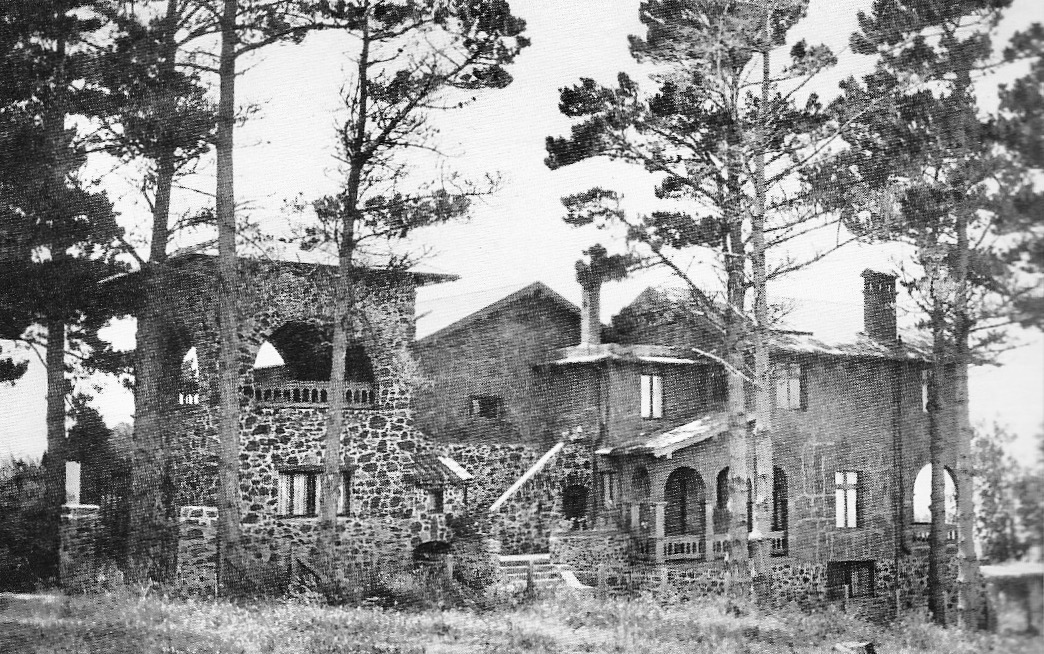
La Playa Hotel, founded in 1913, is one of Carmel's oldest establishments.

Carmel incorporated in 1916. In 1925, Paul Aiken Flanders built the Flanders Mansion and used his home as a model for the Hatton Fields subdivision. The City of Carmel purchased the Flanders Mansion and adjoining 14.9 acres (6.0 ha) in 1972, from the Flanders heirs for US$275,000 (equivalent to $2,116,647 in 2025). It has become part of the Mission Trail Nature Preserve.

In 1932, the city developed the Devendorf Park that occupies the block of Ocean Avenue and Junipero Avenue. The city park is Carmel's central gathering place for outdoor events.

== Geography ==
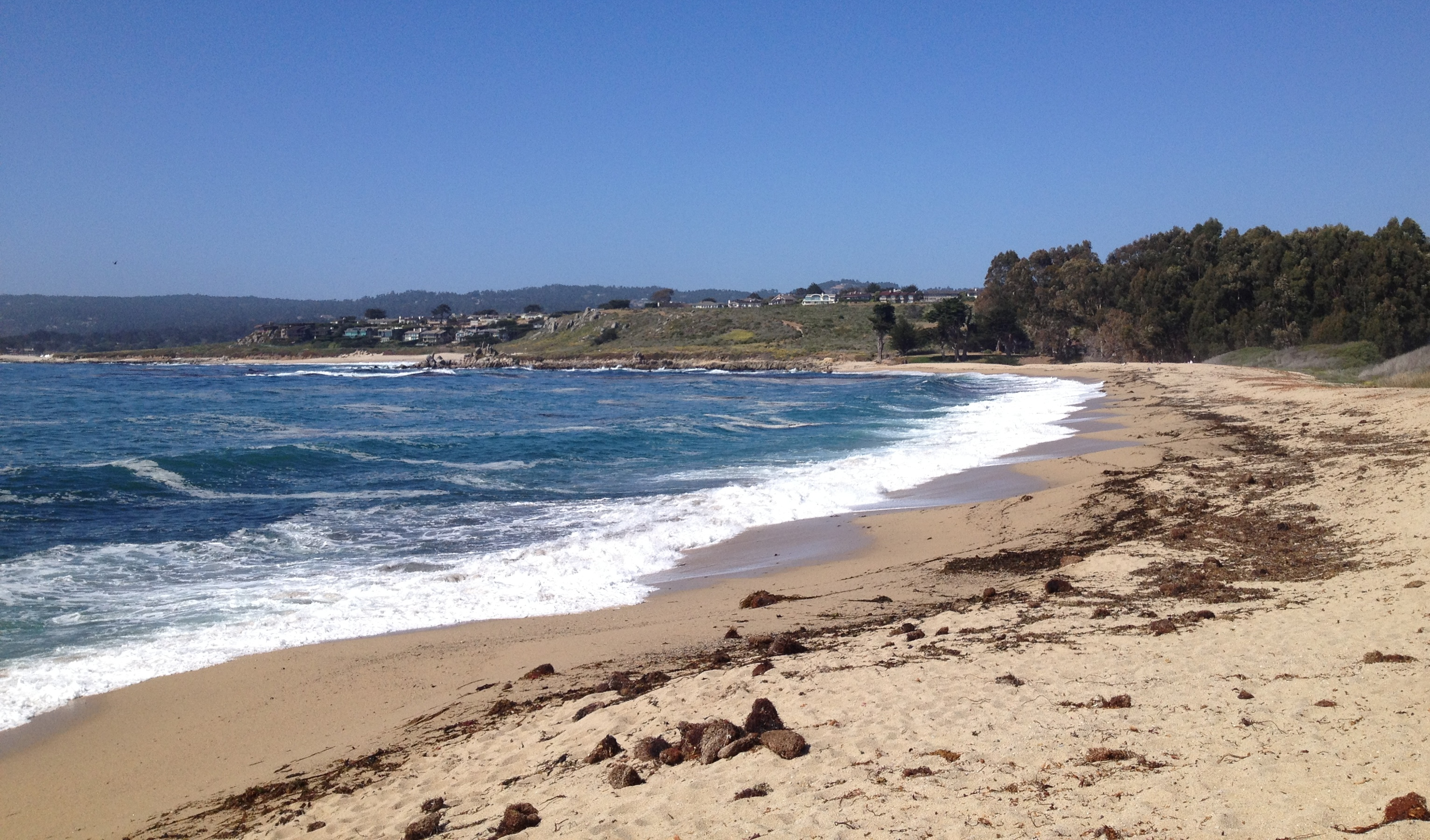
Carmel Bay viewed from the beach

Carmel is located on the Monterey Peninsula on the southern portion of Monterey Bay, on the Central Coast of California.

Carmel Pinnacles State Marine Reserve, Carmel Bay State Marine Conservation Area, Point Lobos State Marine Reserve and Point Lobos State Marine Conservation Area are marine protected areas in the waters around Carmel.

Carmel-by-the-Sea is situated in a moderate seismic risk zone, the principal threats being the San Andreas Fault, which is approximately thirty miles northeast, and the Palo Colorado Fault which traces offshore through the Pacific Ocean several miles away. More minor potentially active faults nearby are the Church Creek Fault and the San Francisquito Fault.

=== Climate ===
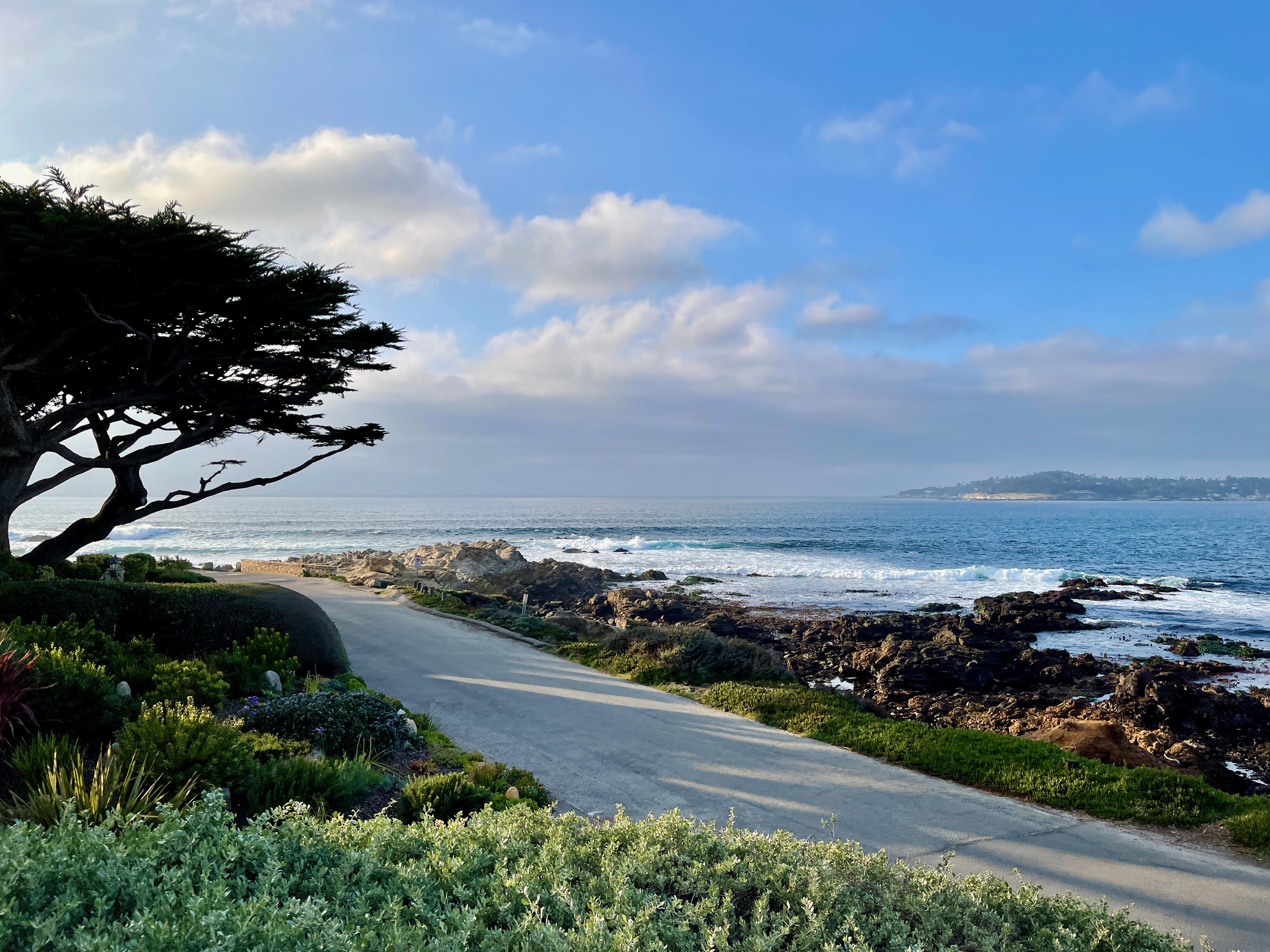
View from Carmel Point

Carmel-by-the-Sea experiences a cool summer Mediterranean climate (Köppen climate classification Csb), typical in coastal areas of California. Summers offer occasional warm days but are typically mild, with overcast mornings produced by marine layer clouds which can bring drizzles that typically give way to clear skies in the afternoon. Winters are also mild, with temperatures only about five degrees cooler than those of the summer.

September and October (Indian summer) offer the most pleasant, "summerlike" weather of the year, with an average high of 71 °F (22 °C) to 72 °F (22 °C). Throughout the year, cold temperatures below 37 °F (3 °C) or hot temperatures above 84 °F (29 °C) are quite uncommon. The wet season is from October to May, with ample sunshine throughout the summer and early in the fall.

Average annual rainfall in Carmel-by-the-Sea is 20 inches (500 mm) per year, and the average temperature is 57 °F (14 °C).

Climate data for Carmel-by-the-Sea
Month	Jan	Feb	Mar	Apr	May	Jun	Jul	Aug	Sep	Oct	Nov	Dec	Year
Mean daily maximum °F (°C)	60.1 (15.6)	61.0 (16.1)	64.0 (17.8)	64.9 (18.3)	66.9 (19.4)	68.0 (20.0)	70.0 (21.1)	71.1 (21.7)	70.0 (21.1)	64.0 (17.8)	62.1 (16.7)	60.1 (15.6)	65.1 (18.4)
Mean daily minimum °F (°C)	43.0 (6.1)	45.0 (7.2)	46.9 (8.3)	48.0 (8.9)	50.0 (10.0)	52.0 (11.1)	53.1 (11.7)	53.1 (11.7)	51.1 (10.6)	46.9 (8.3)	46.0 (7.8)	43.0 (6.1)	48.2 (9.0)
Average precipitation inches (mm)	4.19 (106)	3.75 (95)	3.53 (90)	1.48 (38)	0.50 (13)	0.20 (5.1)	0.09 (2.3)	0.11 (2.8)	0.28 (7.1)	1.06 (27)	2.43 (62)	2.73 (69)	20.35 (517)

=== City planning ===
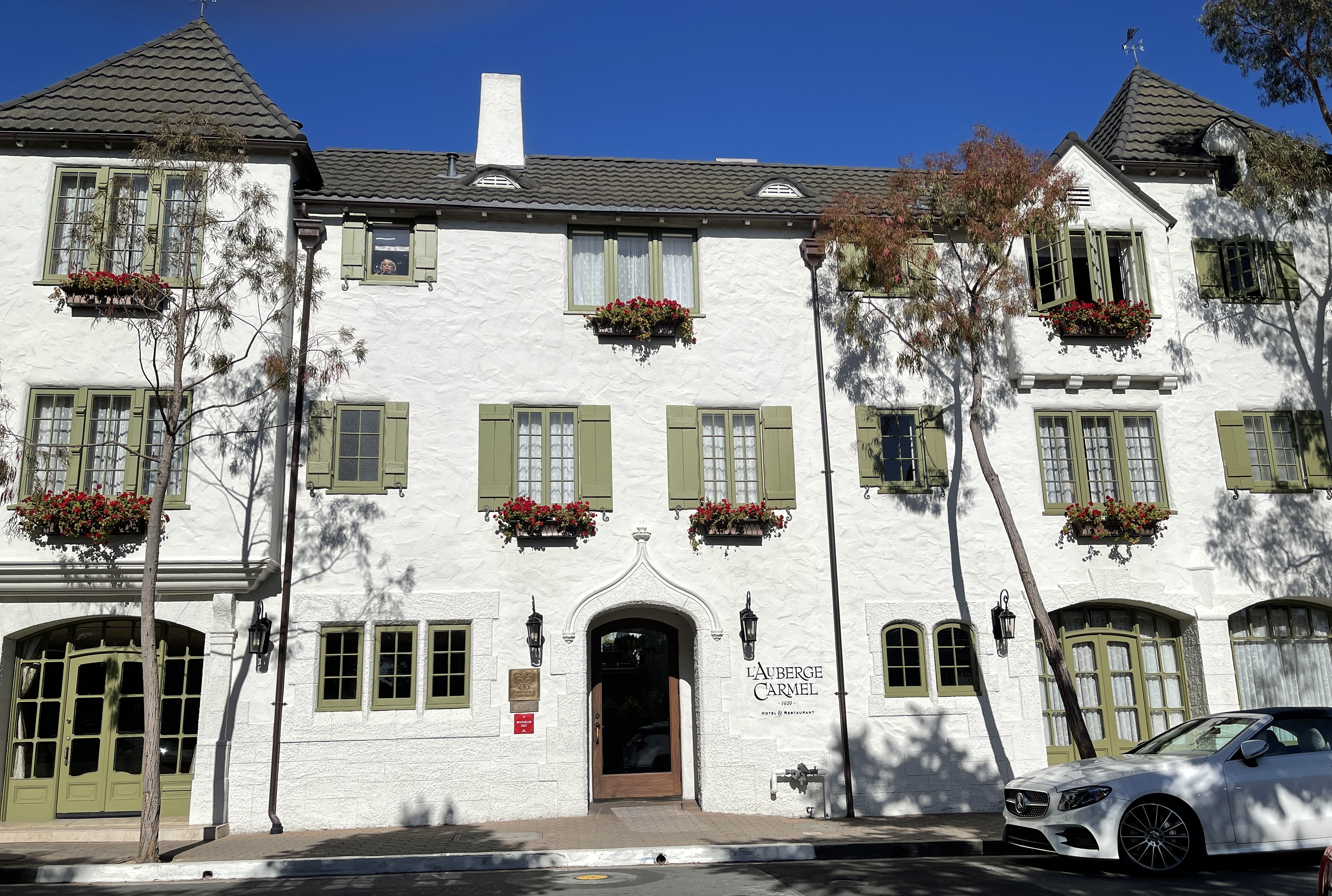
Carmel is known for its eclectic mix of Californian architectural styles, including Mission Revival, Spanish Colonial Revival, Storybook, Mid-century modern, and more.

Carmel has historically pursued a strategy of planned development to enhance its natural coastal beauty and to retain its character, which the city's general plan describes as "a village in a forest overlooking a white sand beach". Carmel-by-the-Sea was incorporated in 1916 and by 1925 it adopted a vision of its future as "primarily, essentially and predominantly a residential community" (Carmel-by-the-Sea City Council, 1929).

New buildings must be built around existing trees and new trees are required on lots that are deemed to have an inadequate number.

The one-square-mile village has no street lights or parking meters. In addition, the businesses, cottages and houses have long had no street numbers. In October 2025, the city council approved a plan to begin assigning numbers to buildings, citing concerns regarding the increasing use of technologies that asked for a street address.

== Demographics ==
Historical population
Census	Pop.	Note	%±
1920	638		—
1930	2,260		254.2%
1940	2,837		25.5%
1950	4,351		53.4%
1960	4,580		5.3%
1970	4,525		−1.2%
1980	4,707		4.0%
1990	4,239		−9.9%
2000	4,081		−3.7%
2010	3,722		−8.8%
2020	3,220		−13.5%
U.S. Decennial Census

=== Racial and ethnic composition ===
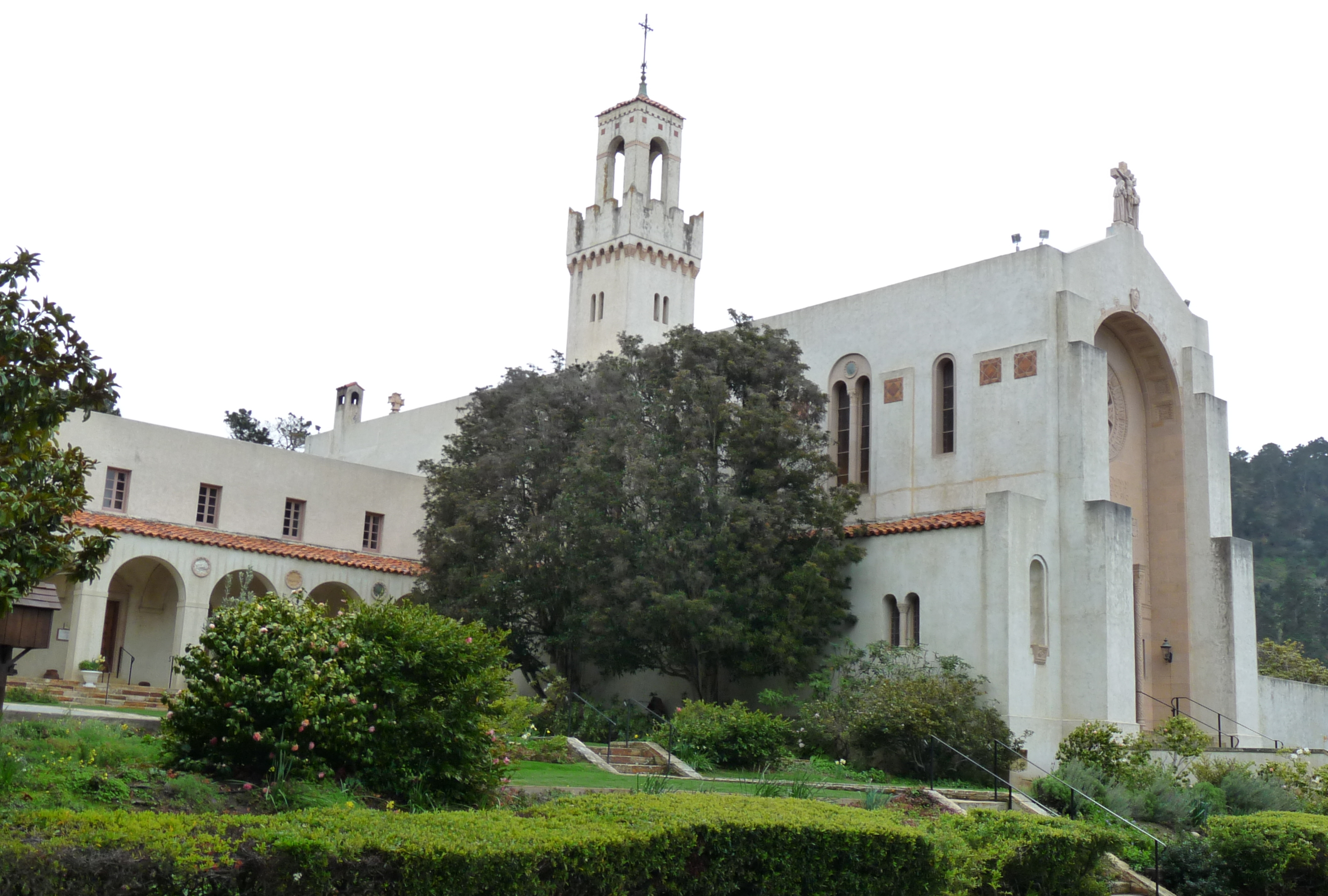
The Carmelite Convent of Our Lady and St. Teresa of Ávila

Carmel-by-the-Sea city, California – racial composition Note: the US Census treats Hispanic/Latino as an ethnic category. This table excludes Latinos from the racial categories and assigns them to a separate category. Hispanics/Latinos may be of any race.
Race (NH = Non-Hispanic)	2020	2010	2000	1990	1980
White alone (NH)	86.7% (2,793)	90% (3,350)	92.7% (3,783)	94.4% (4,002)	94% (4,424)
Black alone (NH)	0.4% (13)	0.3% (10)	0.4% (18)	0.3% (13)	0.5% (22)
American Indian alone (NH)	0.3% (11)	0.2% (6)	0.2% (9)	0.4% (19)	0.4% (19)
Asian alone (NH)	3.2% (104)	2.8% (105)	2.2% (88)	1.7% (72)	3.1% (147)
Pacific Islander alone (NH)	0.1% (2)	0.2% (6)	0.1% (6)		
Other race alone (NH)	0.5% (16)	0.2% (7)	0.1% (5)	0% (1)	0.4% (21)
Multiracial (NH)	2.8% (89)	1.7% (64)	1.3% (52)	—	—
Hispanic/Latino (any race)	6% (192)	4.7% (174)	2.9% (120)	3.1% (132)	1.6% (74)

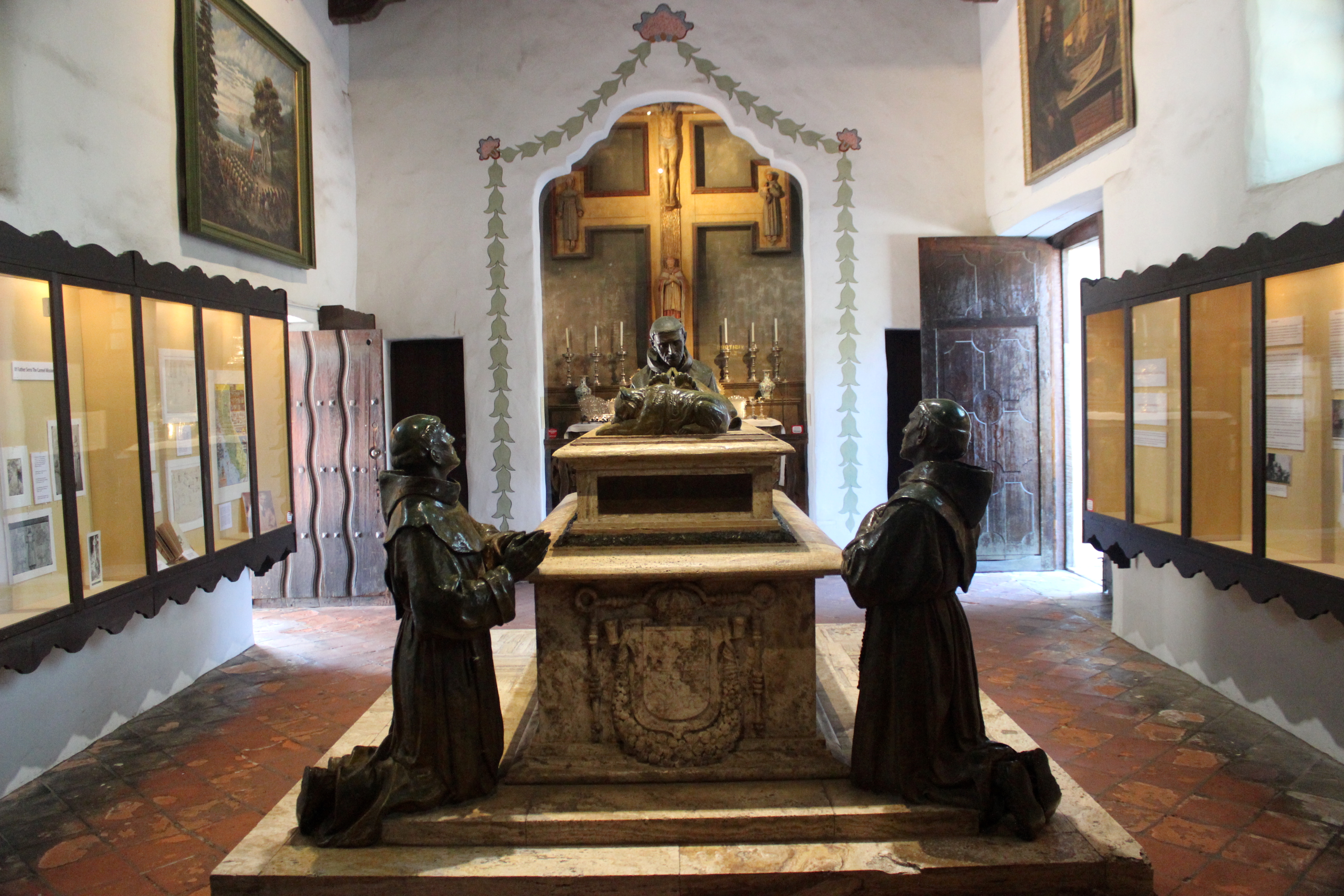
Tomb monument to St. Junípero Serra

=== 2020 census ===
As of the 2020 census, Carmel-by-the-Sea had a population of 3,220. The population density was 3,034.9 inhabitants per square mile (1,171.8/km^{2}).

The age distribution was 10.2% under the age of 18, 3.7% aged 18 to 24, 11.6% aged 25 to 44, 28.3% aged 45 to 64, and 46.2% who were 65 years of age or older. The median age was 63.0 years. For every 100 females, there were 81.3 males, and for every 100 females age 18 and over, there were 80.3 males age 18 and over.

The census reported that 99.2% of the population lived in households, 0.4% lived in non-institutionalized group quarters, and 0.5% were institutionalized. 100.0% of residents lived in urban areas, while 0.0% lived in rural areas.

There were 1,721 households, out of which 12.9% included children under the age of 18, 42.5% were married-couple households, 3.1% were cohabiting couple households, 37.1% had a female householder with no partner present, and 17.3% had a male householder with no partner present. 41.5% of households were one person, and 26.8% were one person aged 65 or older. The average household size was 1.86. There were 912 families (53.0% of all households).

There were 3,056 housing units at an average density of 2,880.3 units per square mile (1,112.1 units/km^{2}), of which 1,721 (56.3%) were occupied and 43.7% were vacant. Of the occupied units, 60.5% were owner-occupied, and 39.5% were occupied by renters. The homeowner vacancy rate was 2.4% and the rental vacancy rate was 11.1%.

=== Income and poverty ===
In 2023, the US Census Bureau estimated that the median household income was $115,729, and the per capita income was $87,422. About 0.0% of families and 4.9% of the population were below the poverty line.

== Arts and culture ==
=== Performing arts ===
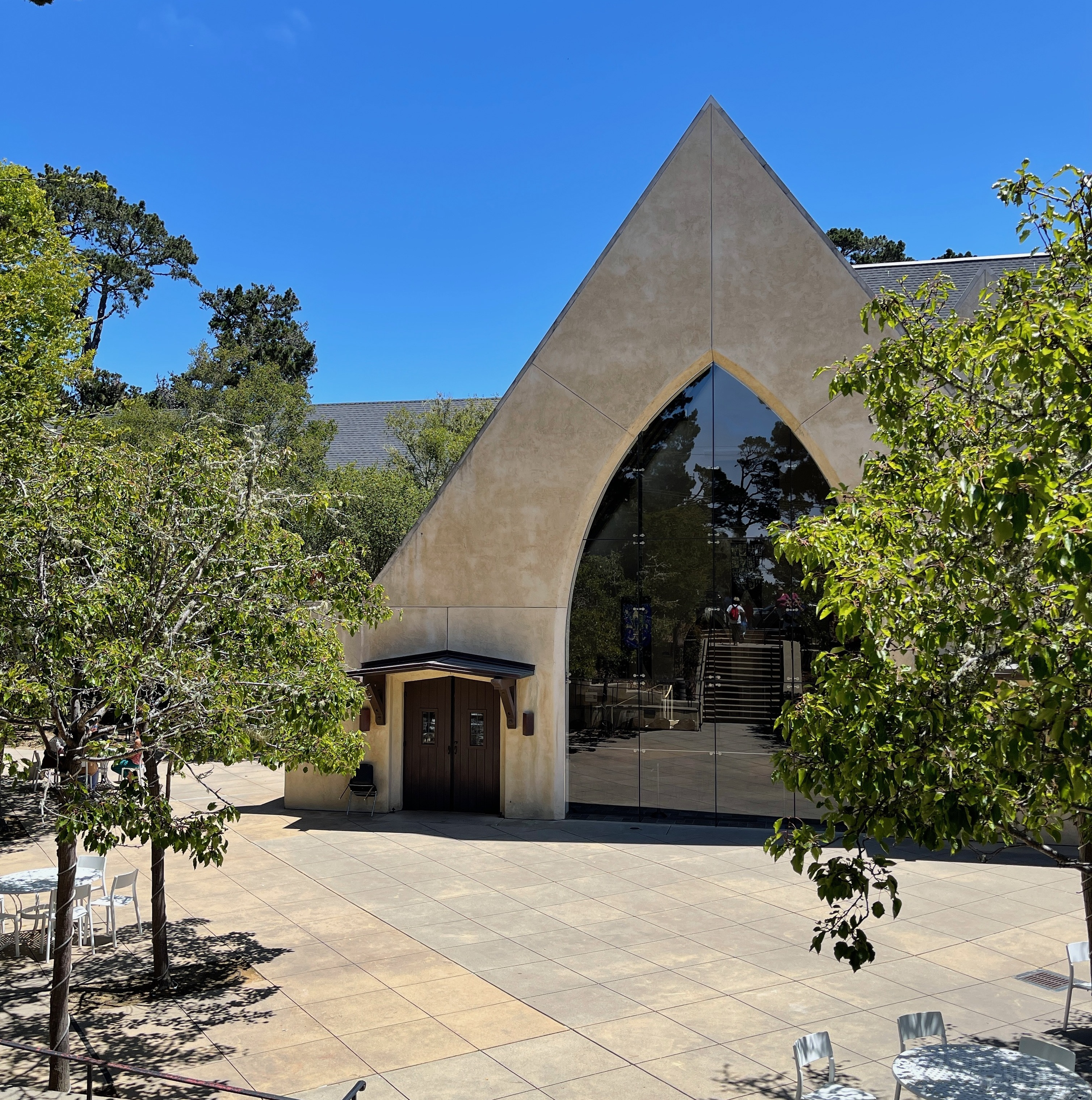
Sunset Center, home to Carmel Bach Festival

In 1907, Carmel's first cultural center and theatre, the Carmel Arts and Crafts Clubhouse, was built. Poets Mary Austin and George Sterling performed their "private theatricals" there. By 1913, The Arts and Crafts Club had begun organizing lessons for aspiring painters, actors, and craftsmen.

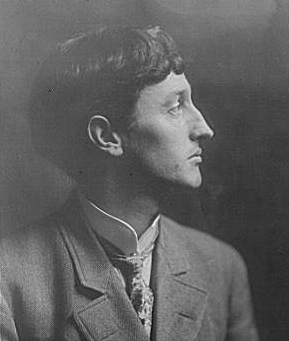
George Sterling helped establish Carmel's arts colony.

As theatrical activities grew, two competing indoor theatres were built between 1922 and 1924: the Arts & Crafts Hall and the Theatre of the Golden Bough, designed and built by Edward G. Kuster and originally located on Ocean Avenue. In 1935, after a production of By Candlelight, the Golden Bough was destroyed by fire. Kuster, who had previously bought out the Arts and Crafts Theatre, moved his operation to the older facility and renamed it the Golden Bough Playhouse. In 1949, after remounting By Candlelight, the playhouse again burned to the ground. It was rebuilt and reopened in 1952.

In 1931 the Carmel Sunset School constructed a new auditorium with Gothic-inspired architecture and seating for 700. Often doubling as a performing arts venue for the community, the facility was bought by the City of Carmel-by-the-Sea in 1964, renaming the venue the Sunset Theatre. In 2003, following a $22 million renovation, the Sunset Center re-opened with the 66th annual Carmel Bach Festival.

In 1949, the first Forest Theater Guild was organized. For most of the 1960s, the outdoor theater lay unused and neglected, with the original Forest Theater Guild having ceased operations in 1961. In 1968, Marcia Hovick's Children's Experimental Theater leased the indoor theater and continued until 2010. In 1972, a new Forest Theater Guild was incorporated and continues to produce musicals, adding a film series in 1997.

=== Literature ===
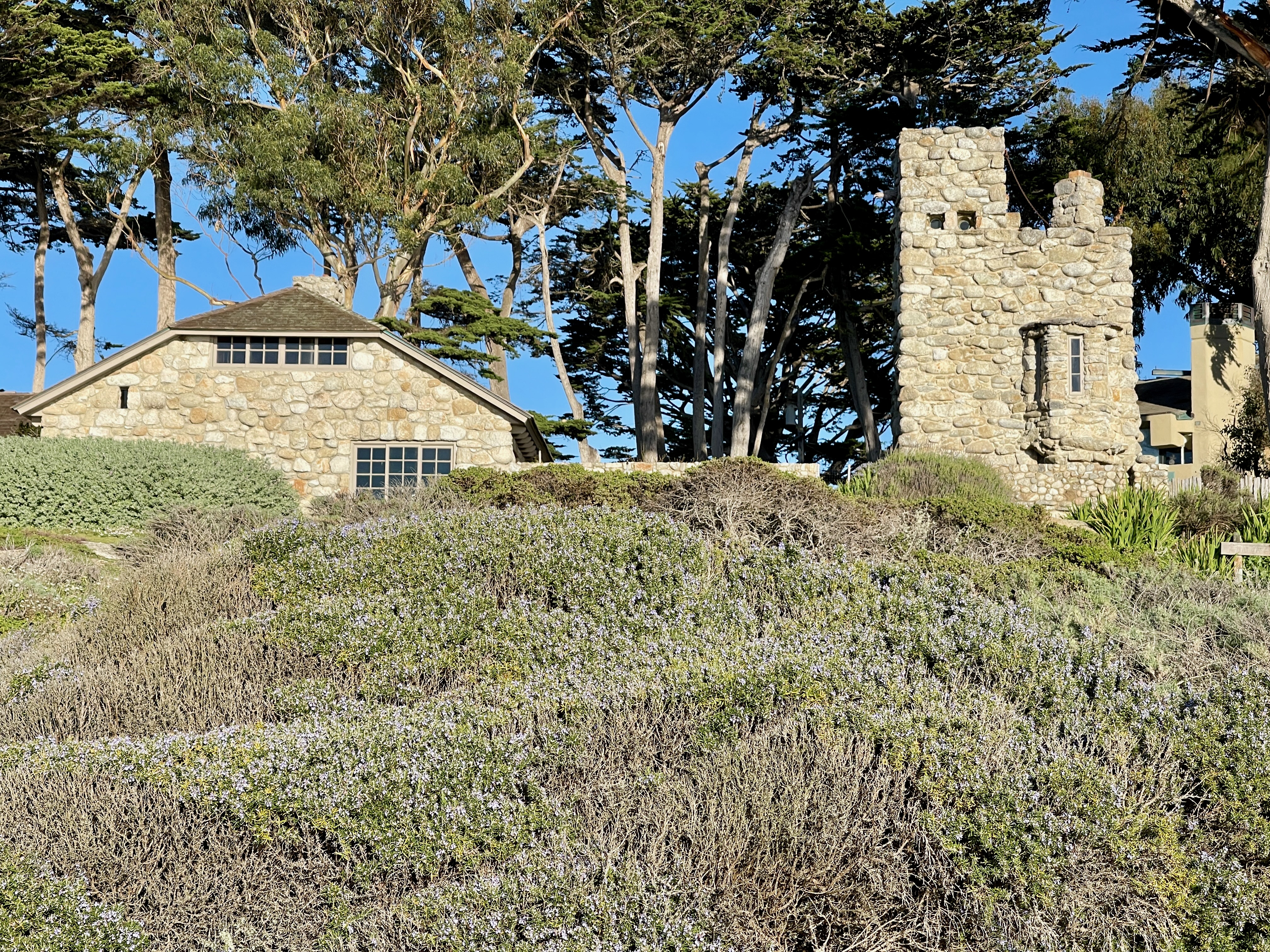
Tor House and Hawk Tower, built 1919–24 by poet Robinson Jeffers

In 1905 novelist Mary Austin moved to Carmel. She is best known for her tribute to the deserts of the American Southwest, The Land of Little Rain. Her play, Fire, which she also directed, had its world premiere at the Forest Theater in 1913. Austin has been credited as suggesting the idea for the outdoor stage.

=== Visual arts ===
In 1906, San Francisco photographer Arnold Genthe joined the Carmel arts colony, where he was able to pursue his pioneering work in color photography. His first attempts were taken in his garden, primarily portraits of his friends, including the leading Shakespearean actor and actress of the period, Edward Sothern and Julia Marlowe, who were costumed as Macbeth and Lady Macbeth. Of his new residence, he wrote, "My first trials with this medium were made at Carmel where the cypresses and rocks of Point Lobos, the always varying sunsets and the intriguing shadows of the sand dunes offered a rich field for color experiments."

According to the Library of Congress, where over 18,000 of his negatives and prints are on file, Genthe "became famous for his impressionistic portrayals of society women, artists, dancers, and theater personalities."

Photographer Edward Weston moved to Carmel in 1929 and shot the first of numerous nature photographs, many set at Point Lobos, on the south side of Carmel Bay. In 1936, Weston became the first photographer to receive a Guggenheim Fellowship for his work in experimental photography. In 1948, after the onset of Parkinson's disease, he took his last photograph, an image of Point Lobos. Weston had traveled extensively with legendary photographer Ansel Adams, who moved to the Carmel Highlands in 1962, a few miles south of town.

== Government ==
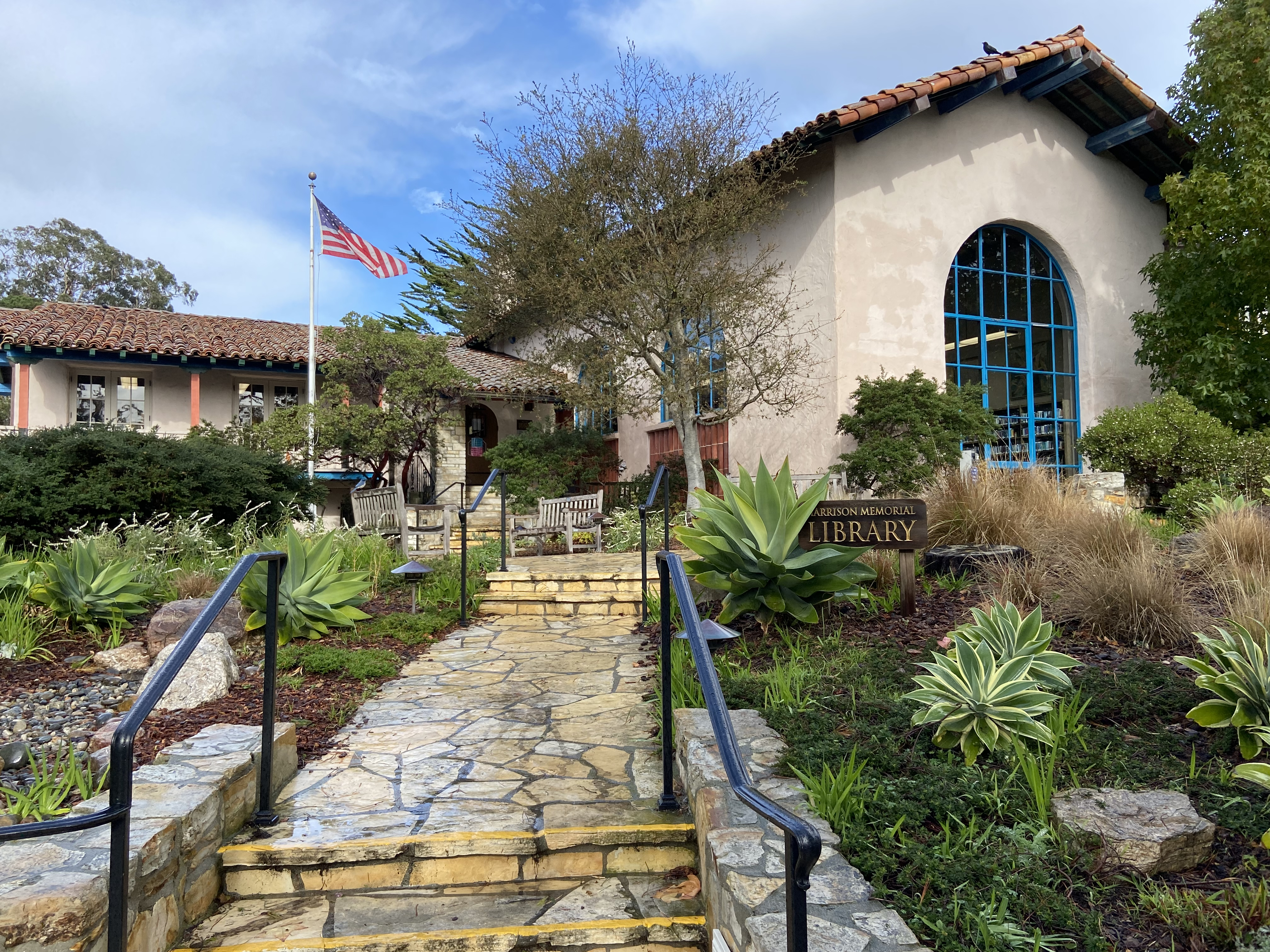
Harrison Memorial Library, built in 1928 in Spanish Colonial Revival style

Carmel is a general law city governed by a mayor and four city council members. The current mayor is Dale Byrne. Elected councilmembers are Mayor Pro Tem Robert Delves, Jeff Baron, Alissandra Dramov and Hans Buder. Chip Rerig is the City Administrator and Brandon Swanson is the Assistant City Administrator.

The City of Carmel-by-the-Sea has established a "sphere of influence" that includes the communities of Carmel Woods, Hatton Fields, Mission Fields, Mission Tract, Carmel Point, and Carmel Hills. These neighborhoods are officially parts of unincorporated Monterey County, which provides most primary services, including law enforcement, street repairs, and public transit. Except for several shopping areas at the mouth of Carmel Valley, these satellite areas contain few, if any, businesses and serve primarily as bedroom communities to Carmel-by-the-Sea and the greater Monterey Peninsula.

=== Mail ===
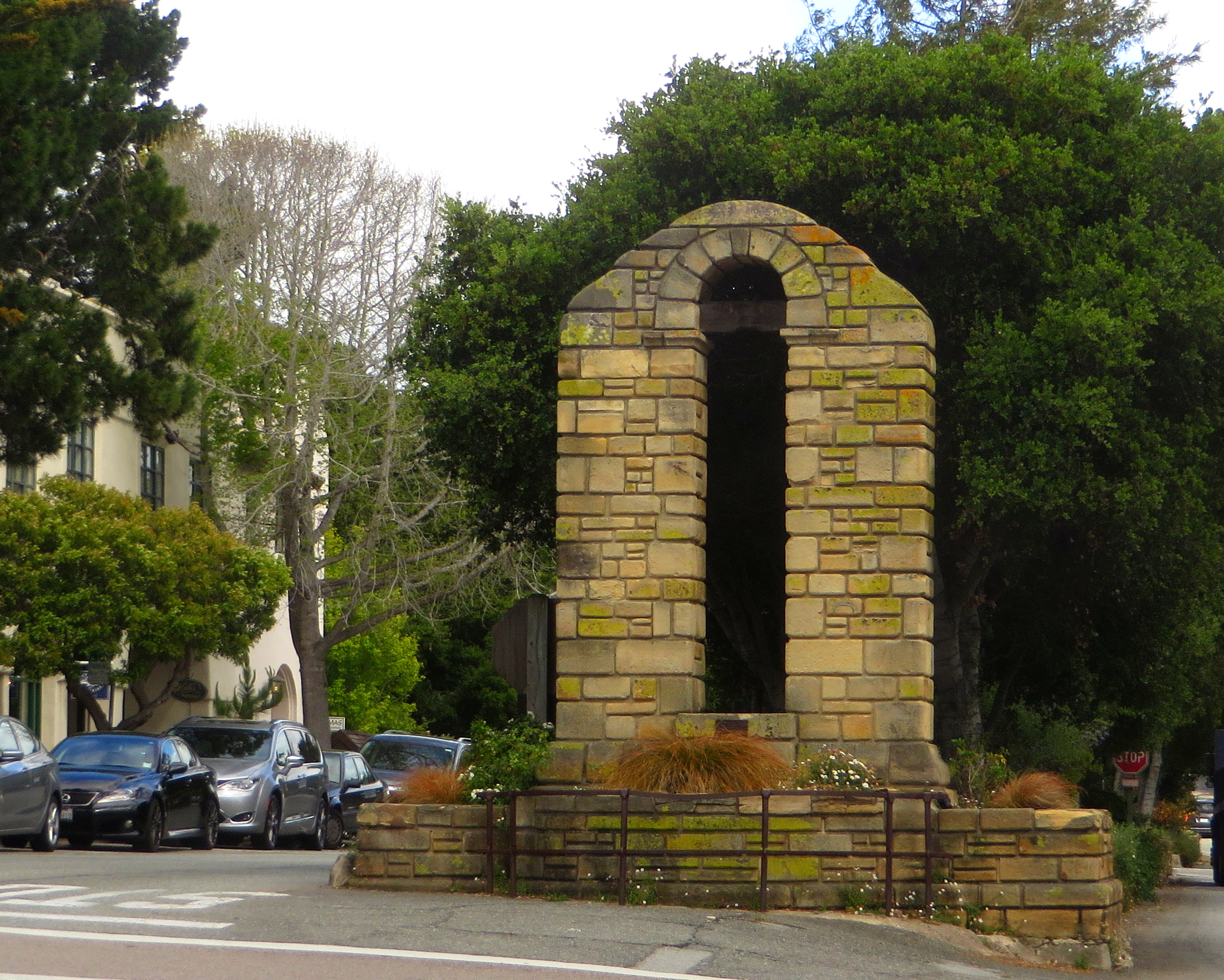
World War I Memorial Arch

In July 2024, Carmel-by-the-Sea City Council voted to establish street addresses for the first time in the city. There remains no home mail-delivery in Carmel-by-the-Sea (by contrast with adjacent, "county-Carmel" residential districts).

=== Unusual laws ===
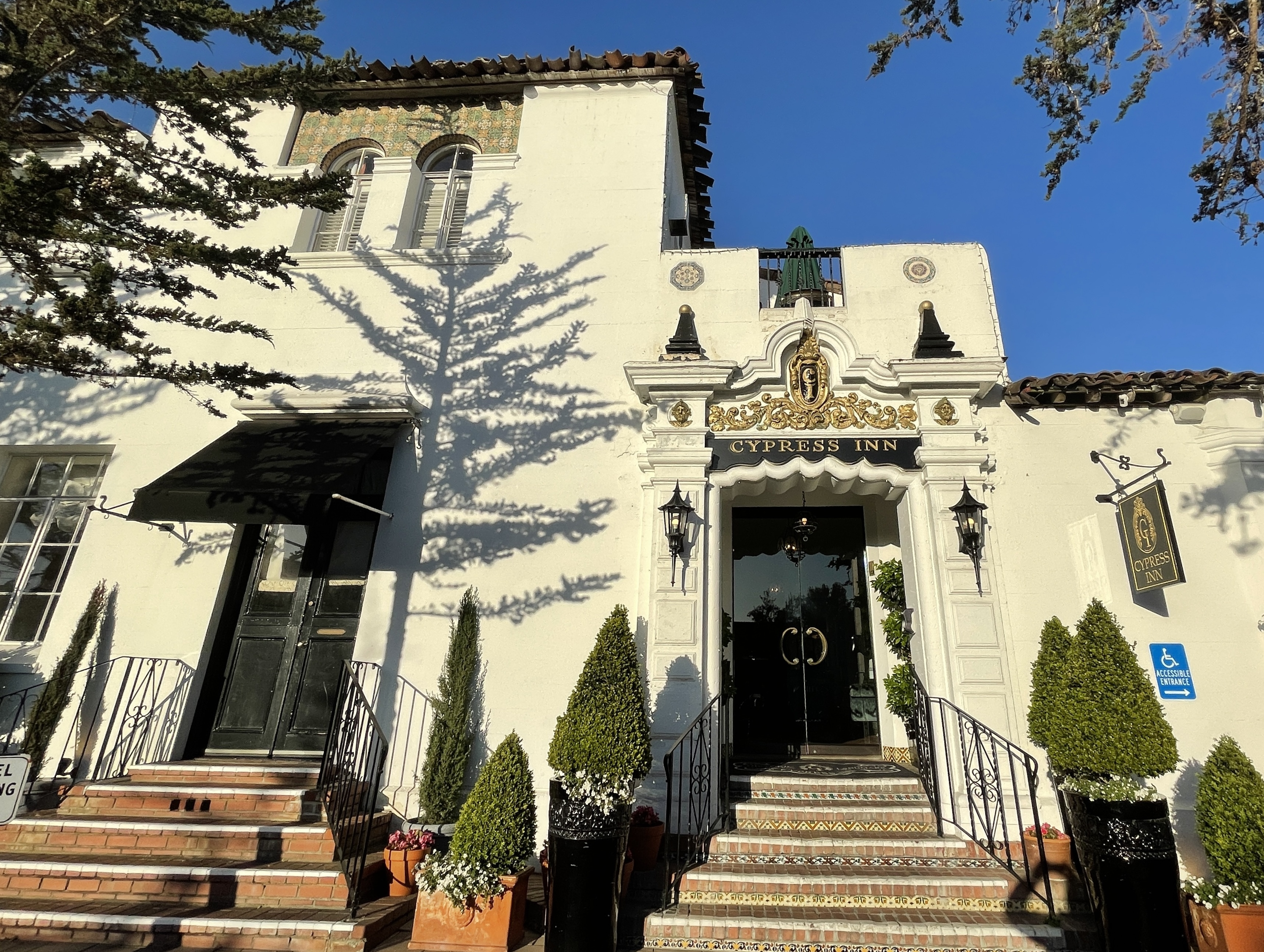
La Ribera Hotel (now Cypress Inn), built 1929

Argyll Campbell served as city attorney of Carmel from 1920 to 1937. He was responsible for drawing up many of Carmel's first zoning laws and ordinances. Campbell backed zoning ordinances that limited the business district and restricted the size of residential houses and lots. These zoning restrictions include no sidewalks in the residential area, no streetlights, no commercial development on the beach, preservation of the native trees, one or two stories height limitation, no chain restaurants, and no billboards. These ordinances have helped preserve Carmel's character as a village.

=== County, state, and federal representation ===
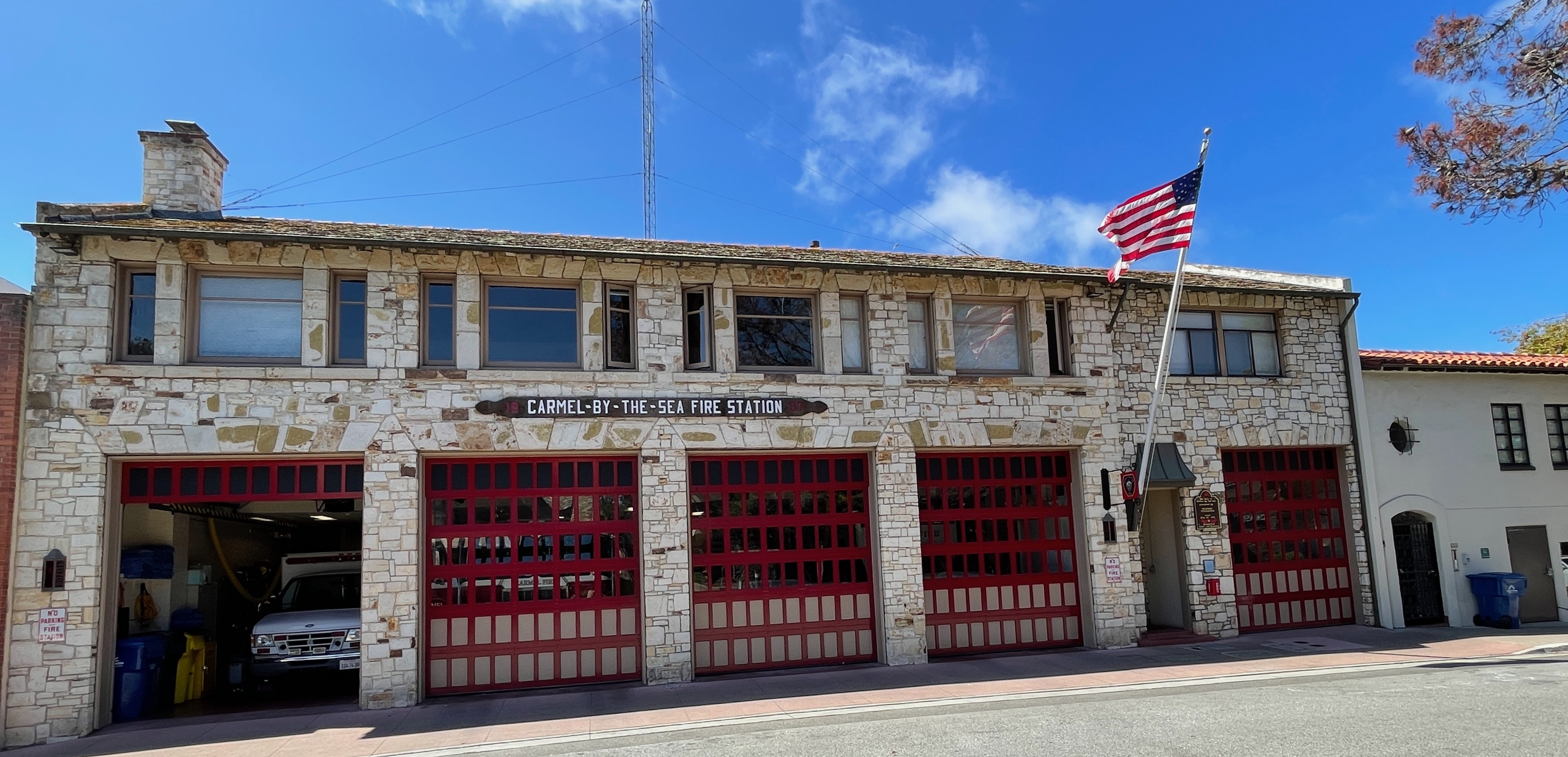
Fire station, built 1937

On the Monterey County Board of Supervisors, Carmel is represented by Supervisor Kate Daniels.

In the California State Assembly, Carmel is in the 30th Assembly district, represented by Democrat Dawn Addis. In the California State Senate, Carmel in the 17th senatorial district, represented by Democrat John Laird.

In the United States House of Representatives, Carmel is in California's 19th Congressional District, represented by Democrat Jimmy Panetta.

== Education ==
Carmel is served by the Carmel Unified School District, which operates nearby schools including Carmel High School, Carmel Middle School, Tularcitos Elementary School and Carmel River School.

== Media ==
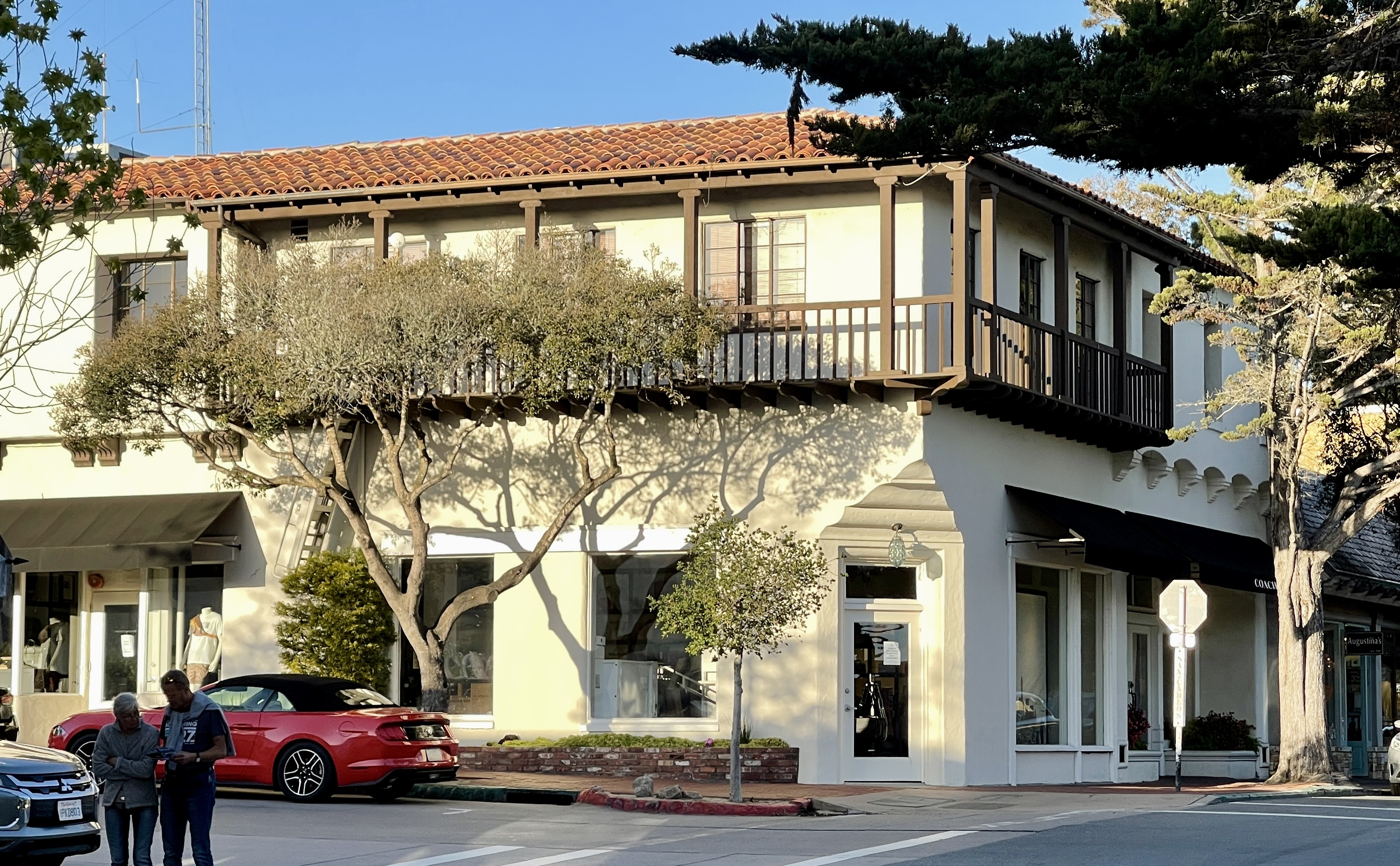
Goold Building, home of Carmel Pine Cone, 1970 to 2000

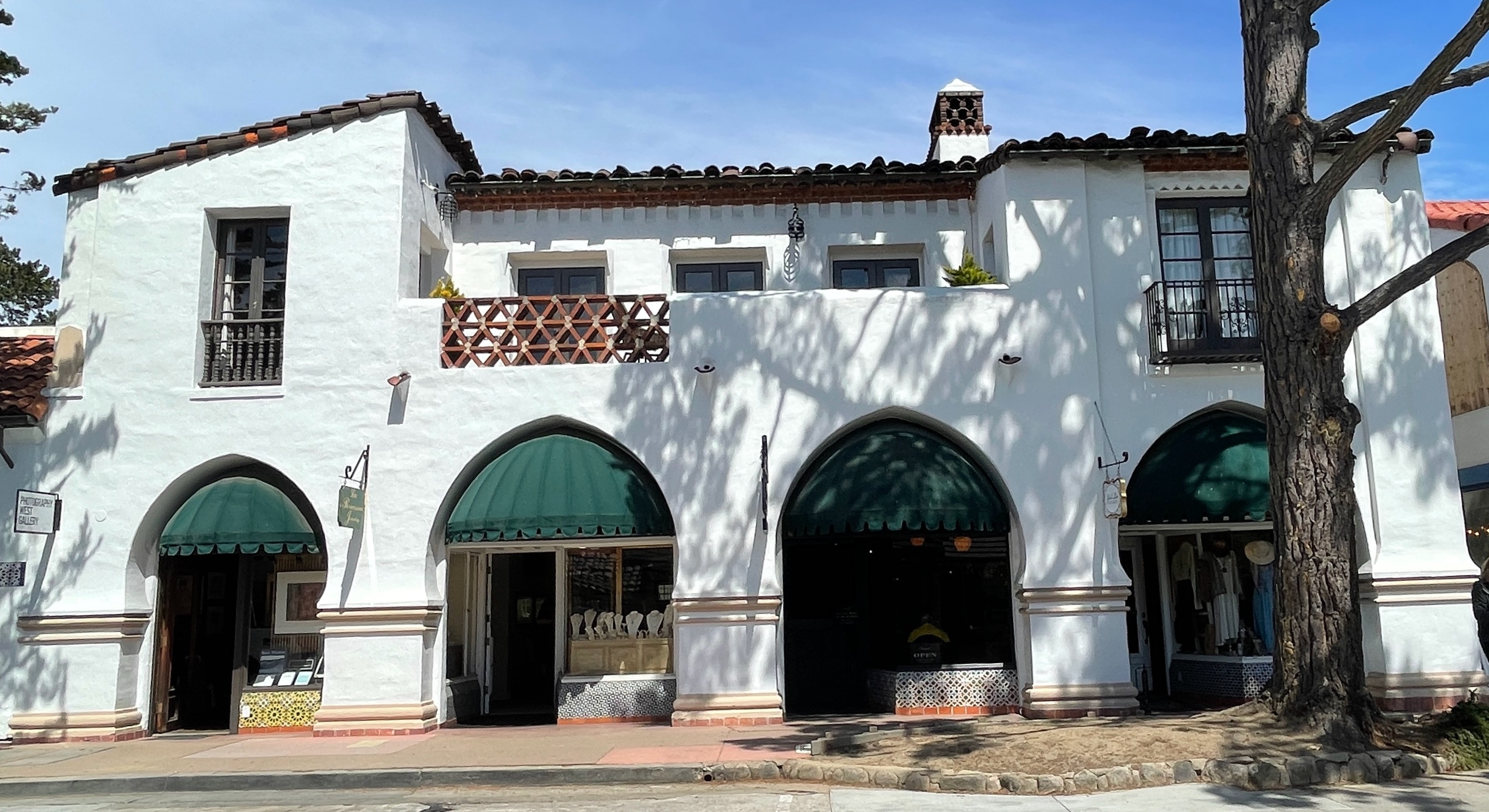
Draper Leidig Building, built 1929

=== The Californian ===
The Californian, formerly The Carmel Sun, was published weekly in 1936–1937 by E.F. Bunch in Carmel-By-The-Sea.

=== Carmel Pine Cone ===
The Carmel Pine Cone is the town's weekly newspaper and has been published since 1915, covering local news, politics, arts, entertainment, opinions and real estate.

=== Film ===
In February 2009, Carmel was used as a prime location for the 24-day film shoot of The Forger.

In February 2021, Carmel was used as a prime location for All the Old Knives.

== Transportation ==
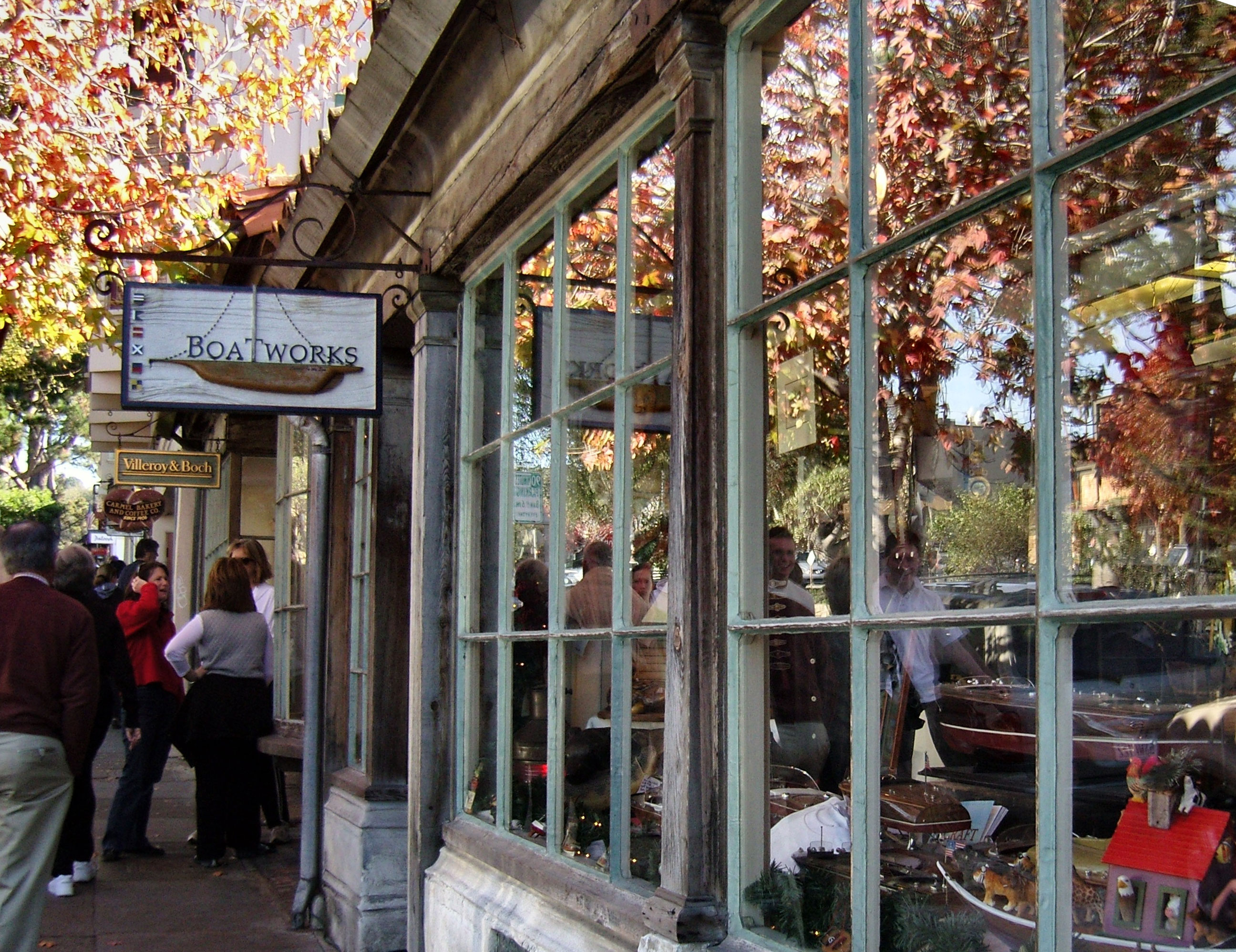
Shops on Ocean Avenue

Carmel-by-the-Sea does not have traffic lights to preserve the city's residential character.

Bus service is provided by Monterey County's Monterey–Salinas Transit. Carmel is one of the Cities connected by Route 5 and serves as a final Major stop before terminating at Carmel Rancho.

== Notable people ==
=== Actors ===
- Jean Arthur, actress
- Barbara Babcock, actress
- Ian Bohen, actor
- Doris Day, actress, singer
- Clint Eastwood, actor, film director, mayor of Carmel 1986–1988
- Joan Fontaine, actress
- Brodie Greer, actor
- Craig Kilborn, entertainer, talk show host, comedian
- Sondra Locke (1944–2018), actress, film director
- Stephen Moorer, founder/actor with Pacific Repertory Theatre
- Brad Pitt, actor, film producer
- Dick Sargent (1930–1994), actor
- Jeremy Sumpter, actor
- Betty White (1922–2021), actress

=== Business leaders ===
- Joseph Costello, businessman
- Ingemar Henry Lundquist, inventor and mechanical engineer, most notable for inventing over-the-wire balloon angioplasty
- Hugh W. Comstock, Carmel designer and builder
- Michael J. Murphy Carmel builder and businessman

=== Political leaders, politicians, civil service, activists ===
- Saul Alinsky, community activist, writer and political theorist
- Donald C. Cubbison, US Army major general
- Sam Farr, U.S. Congressman
- Harvey Hancock, Richard Nixon's campaign manager, 1949–1952
- Daniel W. Hand, US Army brigadier general
- Caleb V. Haynes, USAF general
- Anne Henrietta Martin, first American woman to run for the United States Senate
- Jeannette Rankin, first female U.S. Congresswoman
- Walter S. Schuyler, U.S. Army brigadier general
- Joseph Stilwell, U.S. Army general

=== Musicians ===
- Erroll Garner, jazz pianist
- Danny!, music producer, singer/songwriter and rapper
- Carrie Lucas, R&B singer
- Michael Nesmith, musician, songwriter and filmmaker

=== Researchers, scholars ===
- Francis Fukuyama, political scientist
- David R. Goddard, plant physiologist
- Alison Murray, biochemist and Antarctic researcher
- Ira Remsen, chemist
- Philip Schwyzer, a Shakespeare scholar
- William F. Sharpe, Nobel Laureate

=== Sports ===
- Andrew Franks, NFL kicker
- Scott Fujita, NFL linebacker
- Atlee Hammaker, former pitcher for the San Francisco Giants.
- Brita Sigourney, Olympian and freestyle skier
- Bob Wartinger, powerboat world champion
- Kerry Woodson, professional baseball player

=== Visual artists, designers ===
- Ansel Adams, photographer
- Gus Arriola, cartoonist
- Jennie V. Cannon, Artist, author,
- Wah Ming Chang, Hollywood artist, designer/sculptor, Oscar winner
- Eldon Dedini, cartoonist
- Eyvind Earle, artist, author, and illustrator
- Arnold Genthe, photographer
- Pauline Gibling Schindler, arts editor
- Charles Sumner Greene, architect and artist
- Paul Blaine Henrie, artist
- Hank Ketcham, cartoonist
- Xavier Martínez, painter
- William Frederic Ritschel, painter
- Esther Rose, Western artist
- John Edward Walker (1880–1940) California Impressionist painter.
- Edward Weston, photographer
- Francis Whitaker, Carmel blacksmith artist, Forge in the Forest prior 1962
- Steven Whyte, sculptor
- Shirley Williamson (1875–1944) California Impressionist painter.

=== Writers, novelists, journalists ===
- Mary Hunter Austin, novelist
- Eric Berne, psychiatrist and author
- Gelett Burgess, humorist, author
- Meg Cabot, author, wrote The Mediator series, staged in Carmel
- Beverly Cleary, author, notable books including fictional characters such as Ramona Quimby and Henry Huggins (1915–2021)
- Charlie Fern, former White House speech writer, journalist
- Colin Fletcher, writer
- Nora May French, poet
- Robert A. Heinlein, author
- Darrell Huff, author, writer, architect
- Robinson Jeffers, poet
- Anna Kavan, British novelist
- Charlotte Hoffman Kellogg (1874–1960), author and social activist who befriended Marie Curie and accompanied her to the U.S. in 1921.
- Sinclair Lewis, novelist
- Jack London, novelist
- Cathy Scott, true crime author, biographer and journalist
- Hugo Schwyzer, writer and feminist
- Upton Sinclair, novelist and social reformer
- George Sterling, poet
- Lincoln Steffens, writer
- Robert Louis Stevenson, author
- Henry Meade Williams
- Mona Williams
- Charis Wilson (Weston), writer, model, and subject of Edward Weston's nude studies.

=== Other ===
- Roy Chapman Andrews, naturalist and explorer
- Father Junipero Serra, a Roman Catholic Spanish priest, Catholic saint.
- Mae Brussell, a radio personality and conspiracy theorist.

== See also ==
- Coastal California
- Timeline of Carmel-by-the-Sea, California
- List of school districts in Monterey County, California
- List of tourist attractions in Monterey County, California
- List of Historic Buildings in Carmel-by-the-Sea
