= Philip Schwyzer =

American-British lecturer and author

- Born: 19 April 1970 (age 55); Santa Barbara, California, United States
- Occupation(s): Author, lecturer
- Relatives: Hugo Schwyzer

Philip Schwyzer (born 19 April 1970) is an American-British literary scholar and author, who since 2001 has been Professor of Renaissance Literature at Exeter University.

== Family background ==
Schwyzer was born in Santa Barbara, California. His father was Hubert Schwyzer (1935–2006), a professor of philosophy at the University of California, Santa Barbara. His mother, Alison Schwyzer, taught philosophy at Monterey Peninsula College. His parents divorced when he was young, and, with his elder brother, he was raised by his mother in Carmel, California. His brother, Hugo, is an author, blogger, and former academic at Pasadena City College.

== Career ==
Schwyzer received his undergraduate and doctoral degrees from the University of California, Berkeley. He also holds an MPhil from Lincoln College, Oxford.

His book Archaeologies of English Renaissance Literature, explored images of exhumation and excavation texts including Shakespeare's Romeo and Juliet and Hamlet, Spenser's Faerie Queene, John Donne's sermons and Thomas Browne's Hydriotaphia. Further publications include Literature, Nationalism and Memory in Early Modern England and Wales (2004).

His book Shakespeare and the Remains of Richard III (2013) looks at Shakespeare's play Richard III and the remains of the king recently discovered in Leicester. Schwyzer predicted that the discovery might lead to a "backlash" against Shakespeare, but also more interest in his play. Regarding the controversy over where the bones should be reburied, Schwyzer said, "Experience shows that burying Richard III has never been a very effective way of getting him to rest in peace."

He has co-authored sister guides to the Norton Anthology of English Literature and has contributed biographies to the Dictionary of National Biography including Arthur Kelton and Thomas Phaer (Phayer). Books that he has co-edited include Archipelagic Identities: Literature and Identity in the Early Modern Atlantic Archipelago (with Simon Mealor) Ashgate, 2004. In 2010, he collaborated with Willy Maley in the anthology Shakespeare and Wales.
