= Carmel Pinnacles State Marine Reserve =

Marine protected area in Carmel Bay

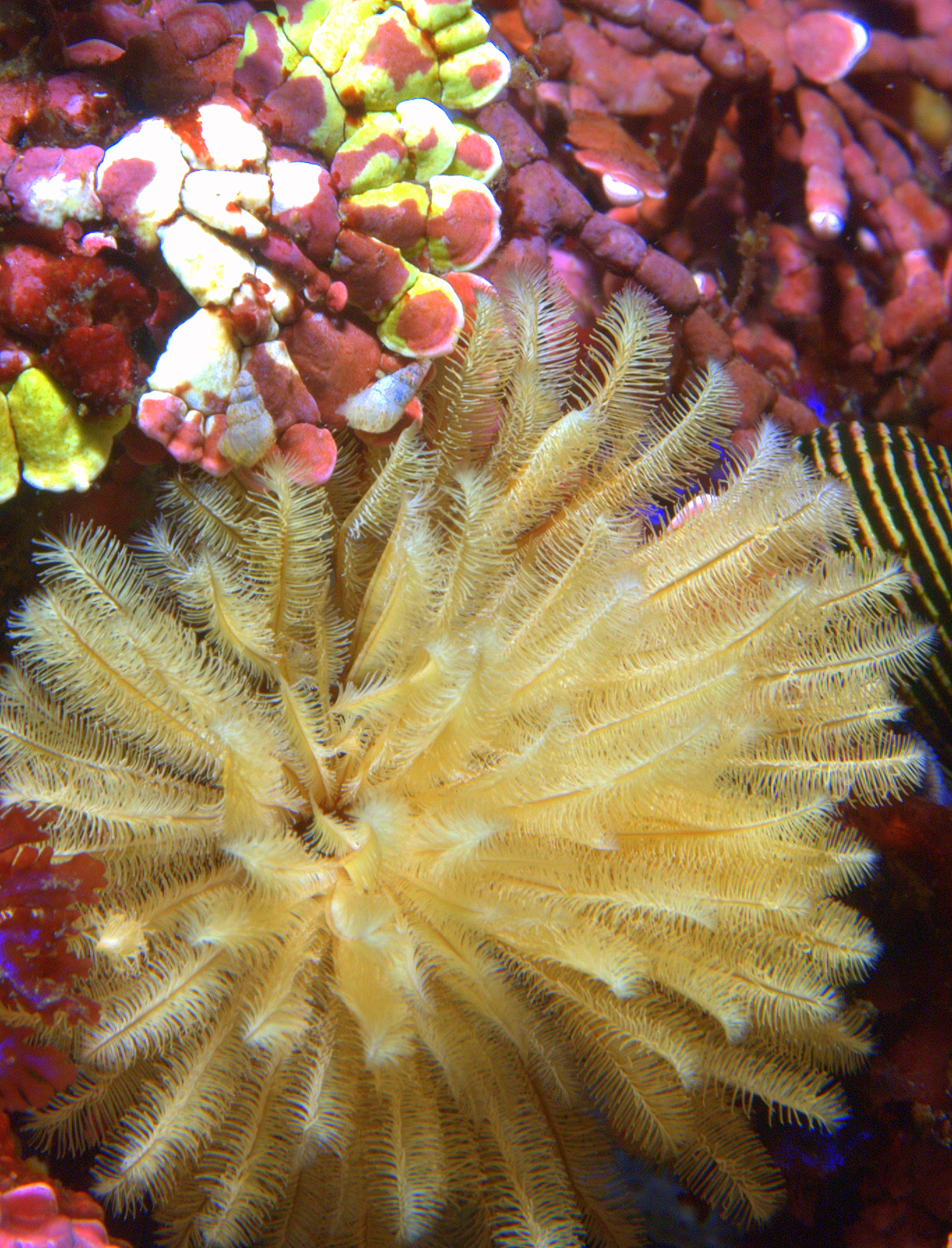
- Feather Duster Worm - Lingcod Reef, Carmel Bay

- Location within California Location within the United States
- Coordinates: 36.556°N 121.968°W
- Area: 1,470 sq mi (3,800 km^{2})
- Established: 1980
- Governing body: California Department of Fish and Game

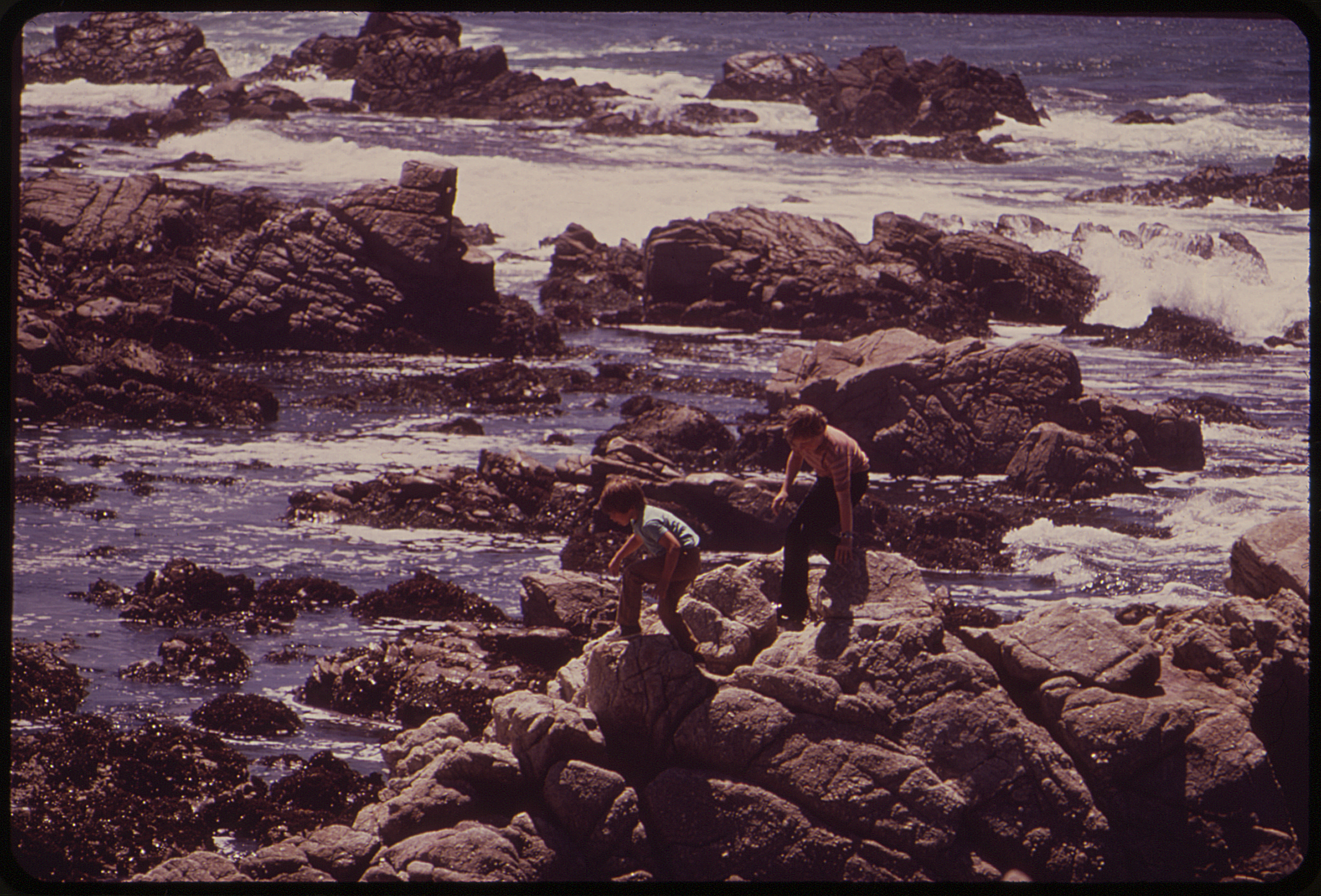
Carmel Beach

Carmel Pinnacles State Marine Reserve (SMR) is a marine protected area in Carmel Bay including a unique underwater pinnacle formation with adjacent kelp forest, submarine canyon head, and surfgrass. Carmel Bay is adjacent to the city of Carmel-by-the-Sea and is near Monterey, on California's central coast.

== History ==
Carmel Pinnacles SMR was established in September 2007 by the California Department of Fish & Game. It was one of 29 marine protected areas adopted during the first phase of the Marine Life Protection Act Initiative. The Marine Life Protection Act Initiative (or MLPAI) is a collaborative public process to create a statewide network of marine protected areas along the California coastline.

This marine protected area covers .53 square miles bounded by the mean high tide line and straight lines connecting the following points in the order listed:

- 36° 33.65’ N. lat. 121° 57.60’ W. long.;
- 36° 33.65’ N. lat. 121° 58.50’ W. long.;
- 36° 33.10’ N. lat. 121° 58.50’ W. long.;
- 36° 33.10’ N. lat. 121° 57.60’ W. long.; and
- 36° 33.65’ N. lat. 121° 57.60’ W. long.

== Scientific monitoring ==
As specified by the Marine Life Protection Act, select marine protected areas along California's central coast are being monitored by scientists to track their effectiveness and learn more about ocean health. Similar studies in marine protected areas located off of the Santa Barbara Channel Islands have already detected gradual improvements in fish size and number. The SMR protects all marine life within its boundaries. Fishing and take of all living marine resources is prohibited.

Local scientific and educational institutions involved in the monitoring include Stanford University's Hopkins Marine Station, University of California Santa Cruz, Moss Landing Marine Laboratories and Cal Poly San Luis Obispo. Research methods include hook-and-line sampling, intertidal and scuba diver surveys, and the use of Remote Operated Vehicle (ROV) submarines.
