= List of historic homes in Carmel Point =

Below is a list of historic homes in Carmel Point, Monterey County, California, USA.

== Table key ==
Listed as a California Historical Landmark

== Historic homes in Carmel Point ==
Building name	Image	Street	Architect/builder	Style	Year constructed	Notes
Butterfly House		26320 Scenic Road	Francis W. Wynkoop	Mid-century modern	1951	Butterfly House is a Mid-century modern house. Due to its unique wing-shaped roof, this building is commonly referred to as the Butterfly House. The house was designed and built by architect Francis W. Wynkoop. It is one of the few houses that are on the Carmel Point shoreline.
Carmelite Monastery		W. Isabella Avenue			1937	The site of the first Carmelite Monastery.
Mrs. Clinton Walker House		26336 Scenic Road	Frank Lloyd Wright	Organic architecture	1951	Listed on California Historical Landmarks on September 19, 2016 (#16000634)
Charles King Van Riper's House		26262 Isabella Avenue	Unknown	English country style	1920	Charles and Helen van Riper were neighbors of Robinson Jeffers and his wife Una. It is located at 26262 Isabella Avenue between San Antonio and Inspiration Avenues.
Cypress House		26405 Valley View Avenue		American Craftsman	1926	Wood-shingled house that was one of the first built on Carmel Point in the late 1920s.
Driftwood Cottage		26398 Ocean View Avenue and the corner of Scenic Drive	George W. Reamer	Japanese architecture	1908	Built for Florence E. Wells (1864–1966) of San Francisco as a summer cottage. The home has George W. Reamer's signature lava rock fireplace. It was the first home of actress Jean Arthur who bought it after World War II, and named it "Driftwood Cottage," with Japanese architecture in the house and garden. A Japanese bronze dragon latches the gate.
Esther M. Hill House		Scenic Road 2NE of Santa Lucia Avenue	Marcel Sedletzky	American Craftsman	1964	The Esther M. Hill House, is located on Scenic Road 2NE of Santa Lucia Avenue on Carmel Point. It was built by Sedletzky in 1964.
Henry Dickinson House		26363 Isabella Avenue	M. J. Murphy	American Craftsman	1923	Home of Henry F. Dickinson was a Chicago lawyer who came to Carmel in 1923. They helped organize the Carmel Music Society.
Dr. Emma W. Pope House		2981 Franciscan Way	Julia Morgan	Minimal Traditional	1940	The Dr. Emma W. Pope House was designed and built by Julia Morgan on a hillside overlooking the Carmel Mission. The one-story, wood-framed house was built in 1940, in the Minimal Traditional architectural style for Dr. Emma Whitman Pope, who was a friend from Morgan's undergraduate years at the UC Berkeley.
Edith's House and Studio		2310 Bay View Avenue	Hugh W. Comstock	Cape Cod style	1936	One-story two-bedroom stone and shingle sided Cape Cod style house with green shutters and a studio built by master builder Hugh W. Comstock in 1936 for Edith S. Anderson and her husband Dr. David H. Anderson. Comstock designed a living room around a large stone fireplace.
Edward G. Kuster House		26205 Ocean View Avenue	Lee Gottfried	Medieval European-style	1920	Like Tor House, it was made of granite stones brought up from the Carmel beach. The roof is Vermont slate. The house is also referred to as the Kuster/Meyer House, because in 1955, Dr. L. Bruce Meyer, an othopedist, bought the house from Kuster.
Gate House		Hilltop Avenue	Charles King Van Riper	Vernacular	1940s	The Gate House was built on four lots, as a caretaker's cottage on the Charles King Van Riper estate on Carmel Point. The cottage roof has extended and rounded eaves and the exterior walls are made of Carmel-stone.
George W. Reamer House		Scenic Drive and Ocean View Avenue	George W. Reamer	Unknown	1910	Built across from Florence E. Wells's Driftwood Cottage
General Joseph Stilwell House		26218 Inspiration Avenue		Spanish Eclectic	1934	Two-story house built for U.S. Army Joseph Stilwell.
Hugh W. Comstock House		26350 Ocean View	Hugh W. Comstock	Tudor Revival architecture	1931	
John Fleming Wilson Cottage		14th Avenue and 2489 San Antonio Avenue	Unknown	Unknown	Early 1910s	John Fleming Wilson built a cottage as a writer's studio. In 1912, he sold the studio to realtor Philip Wilson Sr. (1862–1944) who developed the first and only Carmel Golf Course. The nine holes golf course was sold when Wilson Sr., went to service during World War I and the land was subdivided into lots. The clubhouse became a one bedroom residence.
Mission Ranch		26270 Dolores Street	John Martin	Farmhouse	1859 (built); 1986 (Rebuilt)	John Martin built the Martin Ranch. The ranch became known as the Mission Ranch because it was so close to the Carmel Mission.
Nightcaps		Scenic Road	David Allen Smith	Modern Cottage	1995	Nightcaps is a 1,200 square-foot modern cottage located on Scenic Road in the coastal town of Carmel-by-the-Sea, California. Designed by renowned architect David Allen Smith and built in 1995, Nightcaps is a beautiful example of contemporary architecture that perfectly blends into the surrounding natural landscape.
Sea Urchin and Periwinkle		Scenic Drive	Unknown	Mediterranean-style	1930s	Sea Urchin and Periwinkle, formerly known as Fishermen's Shacks around 1915, are twin white stucco cottages located on Scenic Drive in the Carmel-by-the-Sea. These cottages, built in the 1930s, were once used as fishermen's shacks before they were purchased by Sarah Worcester. In the mid-1960s, the cottages underwent some renovations, including the addition of a basement, driveway, and garage by a subsequent owner. Unfortunately, these historic cottages are now at risk of being demolished to make way for a new house, potentially erasing a piece of Carmel's history.
Seaburst House		26200 Scenic Road	Francis W. Wynkoop	Mid-century modern	1919 (built); 1953 (rebuilt)	Once Col. Dutton's House. The house was referred to as "The Warehouse," and "The Castle" by his neighbor Robinson Jeffers. It was rebuilt by Francis W. Wynkoop in 1953, called "Seaburst House".
Tor House and Hawk Tower		26304 Ocean View	Robinson Jeffers	Tudor	1919	Listed on the California Historical Landmarks on October 10, 1975 (#75000444)
T. J. Brennan House		26097 Scenic Road and Martin Way	Ernest Bixler	Tudor architecture	1936	Ernest Bixler built a large two-story wood-framed and Carmel-stone veneer Tudor-style house for Dr. T.J. Brennan.
Thomas Kinkade House		26443 Scenic Road		Modern architecture	1960s	
Vilhelm Moberg House		2423 San Antonio Avenue	M. J. Murphy	Spanish Electric	1935	Once the home of Vilhelm Moberg (1898–1973), a Swedish author and journalist. While Moberg lived there, he wrote the series The Emigrants. The novels were translated from Swedish to English by Gustav Lannestock, who lived with his wife nearby on Scenic Road. Moberg lived in Carmel from 1948 to 1960.
Whitecaps		Scenic Road	David Allen Smith	Modern Cottage	1980	Whitecaps is a modern cottage situated in the coastal town of Carmel-by-the-Sea, California. Designed by architect David Allen Smith and built in 1980, Whitecaps is an example of contemporary architecture that complements the natural surroundings of the area.

== See also ==
- National Register of Historic Places listings in Monterey County, California
- California Historical Landmarks in Monterey County
- California Register of Historical Resources
- List of Historic Buildings in Carmel-by-the-Sea
