= Hall of Records (disambiguation) =

Hall of Records may refer to:

- Hall of Records, a mythical library buried under the Great Sphinx of Giza
- Kennedy Mitchell Hall of Records, a government building in New Haven, Connecticut
- Kern County Hall of Records, a government building in Bakersfield, California
- Los Angeles County Hall of Records, a rare high-rise by Richard Neutra in downtown Los Angeles, California
- A vault behind Mount Rushmore National Memorial, South Dakota
- Surrogate's Courthouse, a Beaux Arts municipal building in lower Manhattan in New York City
