= Lerdo =

Lerdo may refer to:

- Lerdo, Durango, Mexico
- Lerdo Municipality, Mexico
- Lerdo, California, United States
- Lerdo Landing, Baja California, Mexico
