= Francis W. Wynkoop =

American architect

Francis (Frank) W. Wynkoop
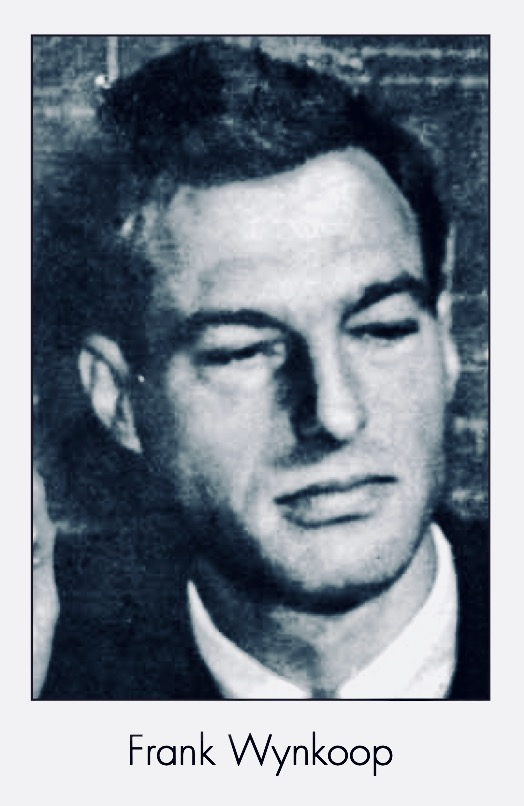
- Born: January 24, 1902; Denver, Colorado, US
- Died: 2 September 1978 (aged 76); Honolulu, Hawaii, US
- Occupation: Architect
- Spouses: Adabelle May Roberts (m. 1924; div. 1944) Virginia Rosemary Floyd (m. 1944; div. 1955) Betty Attwater (m. 1955)
- Children: 4

Francis (Frank) W. Wynkoop (January 24, 1902 – September 2, 1978), was an American architect, known for designing school buildings in Pacific Grove and San Carlos. He also designed oceanfront homes in Carmel Point at the southern city limits of Carmel-by-the-Sea, California, including the noted Butterfly House on Scenic Drive.

== Early life ==
Wynkoop was born on January 24, 1902, in Denver, Colorado. His father was Francis Murray Wynkoop (1869-1954) and mother was Leona Mehan (1880-1951). His grandfather was Edward W. Wynkoop (1836-1891), one of the founders of the city of Denver. In 1904, when Wynkoop was two years old, his parents moved from Albuquerque, New Mexico, to Long Beach, California. In 1910, he lived with his parents in Vallejo, California. By 1920, when he was 17 years old, he was living with his family in Pomona, California.

== Professional background ==
In early 1921, Wynkoop opened an office on 1261 American Avenue, in Long Beach and was connected with D. H. Archibald, a city contractor and builder. In December 1921, he completed the design for two $6,000 brick one-story, four-family apartment buildings at 620 New York Street.

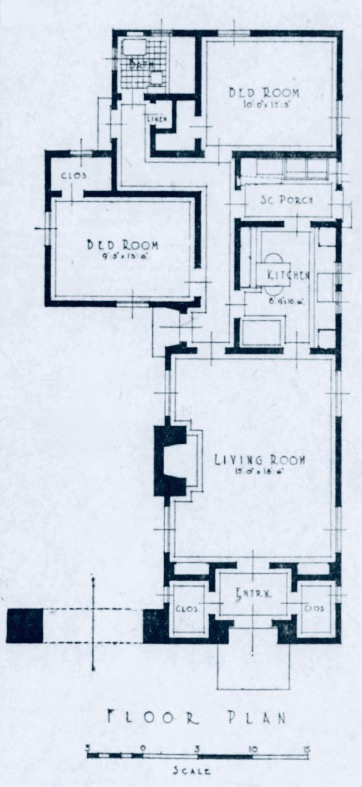
McGrath & Selover Architectural Contest 1924

On July 27, 1924, Wynkoop won second place out of 52 plans submitted in the McGrath & Selover contest under the direction of the Long Beach Architectural Association. The plan he submitted provided the design of a small two-bedroom one bath Spanish style home. At this time Wynkoop moved his office to the entire eighth floor of the Kress building (listed among the Long Beach historic landmarks).

About 1930, Wynkoop married Adabelle May Roberts (1899-1953) in California. They had one son, Dudley, and one daughter, Nancy. In 1931, during the Great Depression in the United States, Wynkoop moved with his wife to Seattle, Washington, where he was a draftsman at the Metropolitan Building Company. Dudley Francis Wynkoop (1931-2012) was born on September 8, 1931.

In 1935, Wynkoop and his family moved to Fresno, California. On February 8, 1936, Nancy Wynkoop (1936-1975) was born in Fresno. In 1937, Wynkoop relocated his family to Bakersfield, California, where he became the local architect with the Adams and Wynkoop firm. His office was at the Haberfeld building where he worked on nine Kern County schools and war housing in Lerdo, California. Architect Eugene Kinn Choy worked for Wynkoop in Bakersfield.

Wynkoop divorced Adabelle May Roberts in October 1944 and married Virginia Rosemary Floyd-Tracy (1918-1998) in Carson City, Nevada. They had one son together, Thor Wynkoop. Wynkoop later adopted Jay: Virginia's son by a previous marriage. By 1945, Wynkoop was the principal owner for the firm Frank Wynkoop and Associates, Architects in San Francisco.

== Carmel-by-the-Sea ==
Wynkoop and his family moved to Carmel-by-the-Sea, California, in the early 1950s. His mother, Leona, died soon after, on December 13, 1951, at a San Bernardino, California, hospital.

In January 1951, Wynkoop designed a scale model for the a 800-student capacity San Carlos-Belmont high school (which opened as "Carlmont High School", to be built at an estimated cost of $1,225,000 (equivalent to $15,194,712 in 2025).

On January 25, 1952, Wynkoop placed an ad in the Carmel Pine Cone advertising his architectural office at Dolores Street at 7th Avenue in Carmel-by-the-Sea, with 18 employees working for him. He built the Pacific Grove High School and the San Carlos High School. As a school planning specialist, he served on the Educational Advisory Boards of Great Britain and Australia. Models of his architectural plans were on exhibition in Boston, St. Louis, and Los Angeles.

=== Butterfly House ===
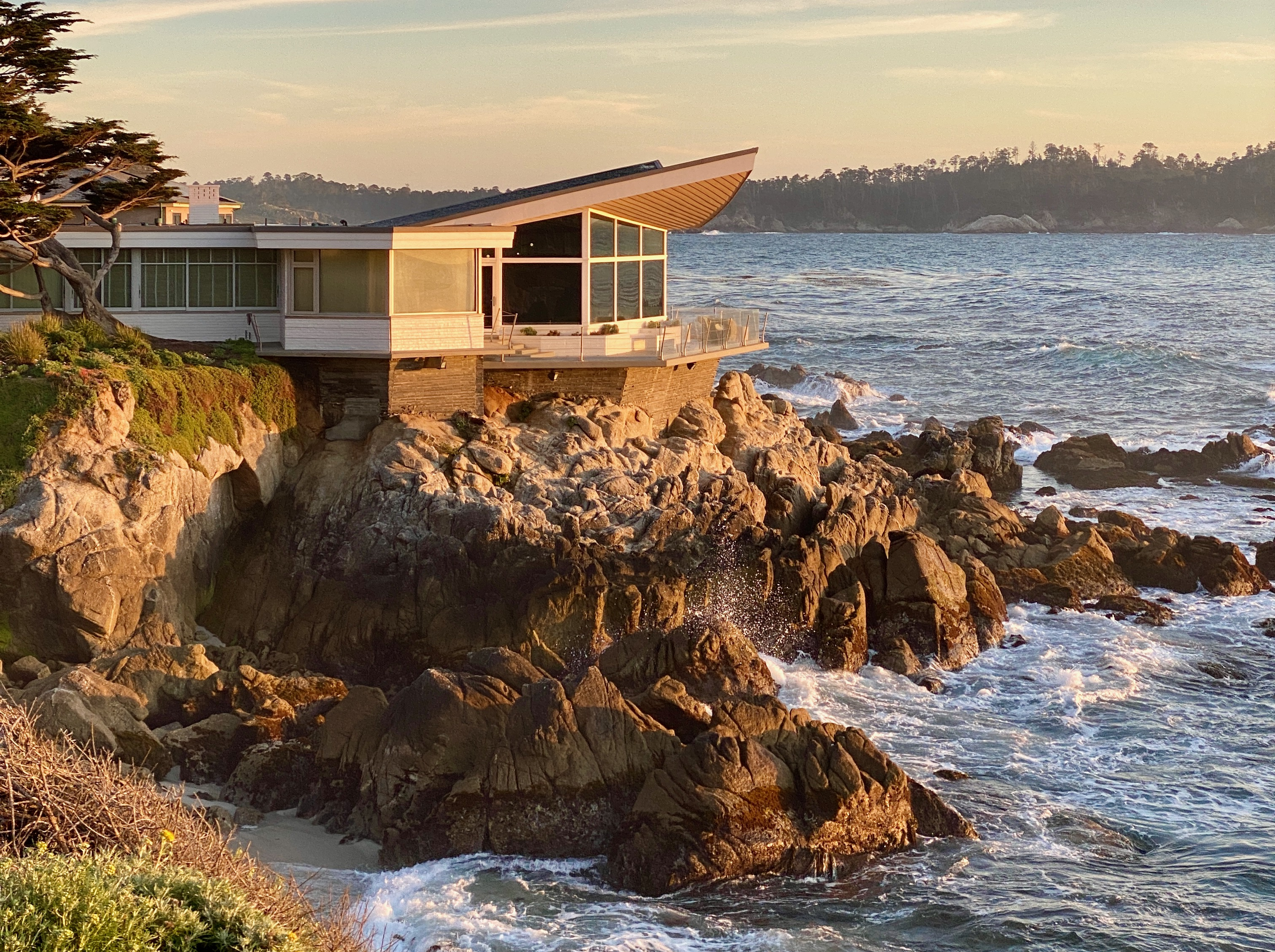
Butterfly House on 26320 Scenic Road

Wynkoop designed two houses on the Carmel Point coastline. The Butterfly House was the first one, at 26320 Scenic Road. Construction began in 1951 and was completed in 1952.

Old-timers in Carmel, shaking their heads, speak of it as the "Butterfly House." Poised at the edge of the breakers, it gives from a distance almost a fragile appearance. But the imaginative architect has anchored his sea-sprayed home, built for himself, his wife and three children, firmly in solid rock.

— Mimi Bell
Redwood City Tribune

He received national attention in numerous newspapers and magazines such as The Californian in 1952, and the National Geographic in 1954 Wynkoop lived in the house with his wife Virginia and son Thor until he was forced him to sell the $135,000 (equivalent to $1,622,516 in 2025) house in 1955 to Stephen Kahn for only $15,000 (equivalent to $180,280 in 2025).

=== Seaburst House ===
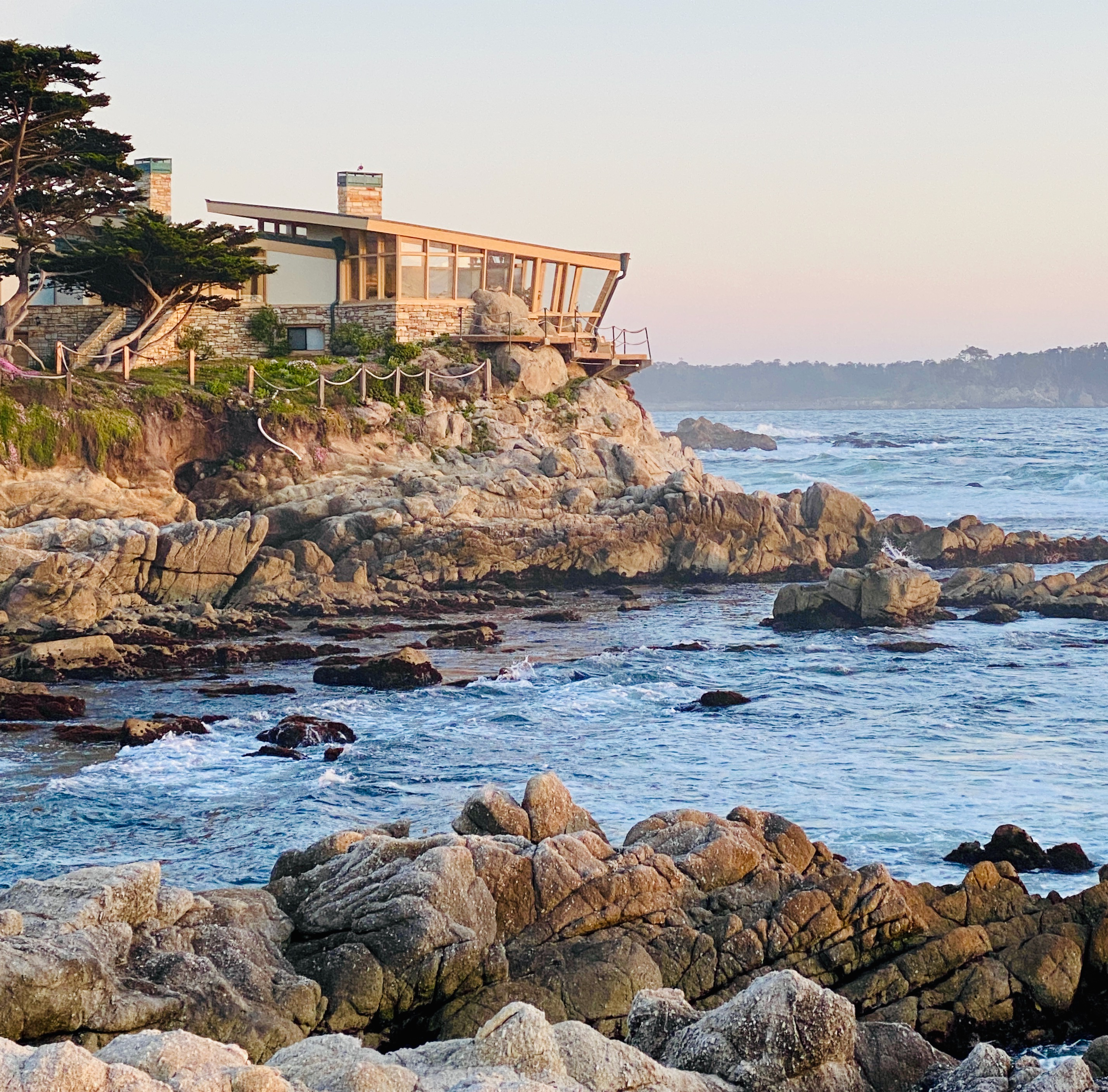
Seaburst House, Wynkoop's second house on 26200 Scenic Road.

Wynkoop designed and built a second home on Carmel Point in 1953 called Seaburst House, also called the Henry Johnson House. It is a mid-century modern Expressionist-style house at 26200 Scenic Road, between the Kuster's house and the Jeffer's house. The design was influenced by Frank Lloyd Wright's organic architecture style.

On March 31, 1953, the Monterey Herald wrote an article with the title: Workman Begin Modernization Of Landmark on Carmel Point. The property was once the Col. Dutton's House, built in c. 1919. It was referred to as "The Warehouse," and "The Castle" by his neighbor Robinson Jeffers. It was a stone "shoebox" size house with large iron doors to the west of the "Sea Road," (Scenic Road) which at the time was a dirt road that was marked by driftwood stakes on both sides of the road.

== Other designs ==
In January 1954, Wynkoop designed the Morro Bay Union elementary school two-wing addition with eight classrooms at a cost of $140,367 (equivalent to $1,682,839 in 2025).

On August 7, 1955, at age 53, Wynkoop married his third wife, Betty Attwater (1916-1981), age 39, in Monterey, California. After selling the Butterfly House in 1955, Wynkoop with his wife and daughter, Nancy, had an office at his residence on Monte Verde Street and 2nd Avenue in Carmel. In April 1955, Wynkoop designed four six-sided Hexagon buildings for the Atwater, Merced County, Elementary School District.

In 1957, Wynkoop and his wife Betty had a son named Kit. Kit was named after Wynkoop's grandfather's close friend and colleague, Kit Carson. That year, Wynkoop designed a school campus and buildings covered by a single roof. The roof covered 138,000 square feet (12,800 m^{2}) of ground. Supporting arches were concrete, and the roof is a series of steel cables and vermiculite concrete that form an umbrella. The estimated cost was $700,000. (equivalent to $8,024,289 in 2025) In 1959, the family moved to La Puente, California.

== Hawaiʻi ==
Wynkoop, Betty, and Kit then moved to Honolulu, Hawaii in 1967. Between 1967 and 1971, Wynkoop worked with Tongg and Associates on numerous projects across the state including the Haiku Woods property in Honolulu and the Princeville Resort on Kauaʻi. In 1971, he created the Hawaiʻi Architects and Collaborative where he worked with his son, Dudley, until 1972.

== Death ==
Wynkoop died on September 2, 1978, in Honolulu, Hawaii, at the age of 76. His wife Betty died on July 19, 1981, in Honolulu.

== Buildings and other works ==
- Brick one-story four family apartment buildings at 620 New York street (1921)
- Two-bedroom one bath Spanish style home (1924)
- Fox Theatre, Centralia, Washington (1929)
- Kern County Hall of Records, Bakersfield, California (1939)
- Delano Joint Union High School District, Delano Union High School, Auditorium, Delano, California (1939)
- United States Housing Authority, War Housing, Lerdo, California (1942)
- Westside Union School District, Elementary School, Lancaster, California (1947)
- Butterfly House, 26320 Scenic Road (1951)
- Rebuilt Col. Dutton's House, 26200 Scenic Road (1953)
- Seaburst House, Carmel-by-the-Sea, California (1953)
- Morro Bay Union Elementary School (1954)
- Atwater, Merced County, Elementary School District (1955)
- Designed a Space Shelter for school campus, (1957)
- Haiku Woods property in Honolulu, Hawaii (1975)

== See also ==
- Timeline of Carmel-by-the-Sea, California
