= John Fleming Wilson =

American writer (1877–1922)

John Wilson
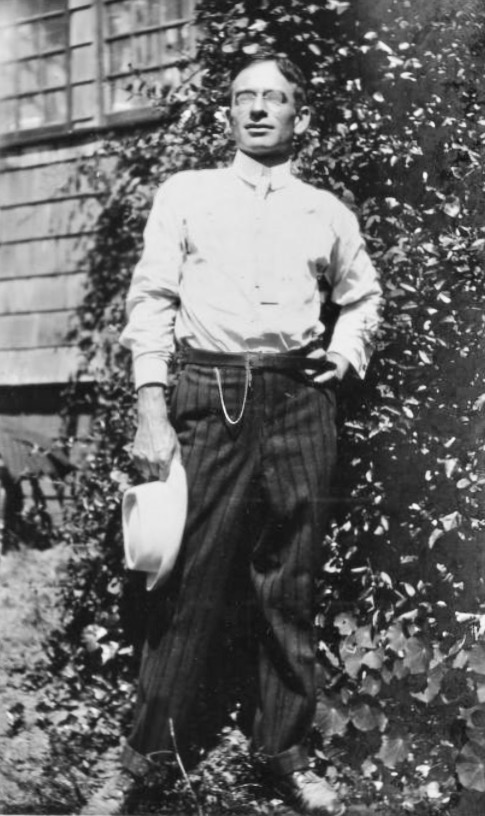
- John Fleming Wilson (1877–1922)
- Born: John Fleming Wilson; February 22, 1877; Erie, Pennsylvania, US
- Died: March 5, 1922 (aged 45); Venice, California, US
- Occupation: Writer
- Spouse: Elena Burt
- Writing career
- Notable work: The Man Who Came Back

John Fleming Wilson (February 22, 1877 – March 5, 1922) was an American author, newspaperman, and prolific writer of short stories and adventure novels, best known for his travel books about sea life. Many of his books and short stories were made into films during the 1910s through the 1930s.

== Early life ==
Wilson was born on February 22, 1877, in Erie, Pennsylvania. He received his education at Parsons College in Iowa, and at Princeton University. He married Elena Burt in July 1906, in Newport, Oregon. He was later divorced and had no children.

He was a deep-sea sailor, a ship's officer in the merchant marine, wireless operator, and lived for a time in Japan. His study of nautical books and the trips out to sea gave him the opportunity to write sea stories.

== Career ==
Wilson was a schoolteacher from 1900 to 1902 at the Portland Academy. He then worked with a newspaper company from 1902 to 1905. He was the author of several books and contributed short stories to both American and European magazines. He wrote at least five novels, two of which were adapted into plays and movies.

=== Newspapers ===
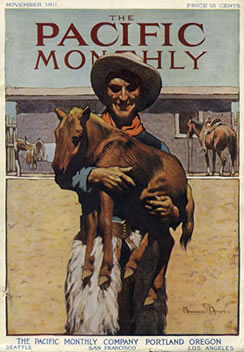
Pacific Monthly (1911)

In 1905, Wilson lived in Honolulu, Hawaii and was a member of the writing staff of The Honolulu Advertiser. A number of his stories were published in The Advertiser, in 1907 and 1908. In 1906, he was editor of the San Francisco The Argonaut.

In 1907, he founded the Newport Signal, of Newport, Oregon. He was also associated with The Oregonian and The Pacific Monthly.

In 1907, Wilson corresponded by letter with author and editor Charles Warren Stoddard (1843–1909), when Stoddard was living in Monterey, California.

In 1909, while working for the Oregon Daily Journal, a Portland newspaper, one of Wilson's stories was instrumental in igniting a successful sanitary milk movement. In an interview with Wilson about the safety of Portland's milk supply, the state dairy commissioner, J. W. Bailey, dismissed concerns about health problems from milk. “Everybody in Portland is drinking milk from tubercular cows," Bailey said. The next day, Wilson returned to confront the commissioner with scientific reports that humans could catch bovine tuberculosis. The commissioner said he didn't believe that, and Wilson called him a liar. Commissioner Bailey grabbed Wilson by the throat and threw him down, yelling at him for several minutes. Wilson quit the paper the next day, but the Daily Journal launched a crusade against bad milk that was taken up by Esther Pohl Lovejoy, the city's health officer. The results were dramatic. Between 1909 and 1913, the death rate for children under two years old dropped 76%.

=== World War I ===
Wilson served overseas in France with the 7th infantry battalion of the Canadian Army during World War I from 1917 to 1919. He was gassed by German shells. After the war he was a patient in a government hospital at Arrowhead Springs, San Bernardino. He then went to Martin's Sanitarium in Venice, California.

== Death ==
Wilson died from burns caused by a gas heater on March 5, 1922, at his home in Venice, at the age of 55. His remains were brought to Hemet, California and funeral services were held at the San Jacinto Valley Cemetery in San Jacinto, California.

== See also ==
- Timeline of Carmel-by-the-Sea, California
- List of Historic Homes in Carmel Point
