= Florence E. Wells =

American California pioneer

- Born: Florence E. Chapman; 1864; Chebanse, Illinois, US
- Died: 28 April 1966 (aged 101–102); Oakland, California, US
- Occupation: Property owner
- Spouse: Frederick E. Wells (m. 1888; died 1894)

Florence E. Wells (1864 – April 28, 1966), was an American property owner who made contributions to the real estate industry in Oakland, California and the Monterey Peninsula. She was a president of the San Francisco Women's Press Club.

== Early life ==
Florence's mother was Susannah Chapman (-1929). Florence and her family moved from Illinois to Oakland, California in 1880.

By 1882, they had settled at 29th and Grove Streets where Florence made her home. Her father built another home at 19th and Grove Street. At age 24, she married an older Frederick E. Wells of Wisconsin, (1846-1894), age 41, on October 8, 1888 in Oakland. He was an American Civil War veteran who survived the hardship of Confederate Libby Prison to take part in Sherman's March to the Sea. She was the great granddaughter of Sgt. Constant Chapman (1761-1847) of the Revolutioinary Army. At a birthday dinner party for her mother, Susan Chapman, Florence exhibited traditional dresses from various countries that she had collected during her travels abroad.

== Career ==
She rented the Driftwood Cottage to actress Jean Arthur in 1937 and sold it to her after World War II.

In March 1953, Florence sold 8 acres (3.2 ha) of her beach front to the State Park of California under the Beach Acquisition Program.

Florence continued to be active in the real estate industry well into her later years. A centenary celebration was held in September 1965 in honor of her 100th birthday, hosted by her nieces, nephews, and friends from Oakland and Southern California.

== Death ==
Florence Wells died on April 28, 1966, at the age of 101, at her home in Oakland.

== See also ==
- List of Historic Homes in Carmel Point
- Timeline of Carmel-by-the-Sea, California
