= Kern County Hall of Records =

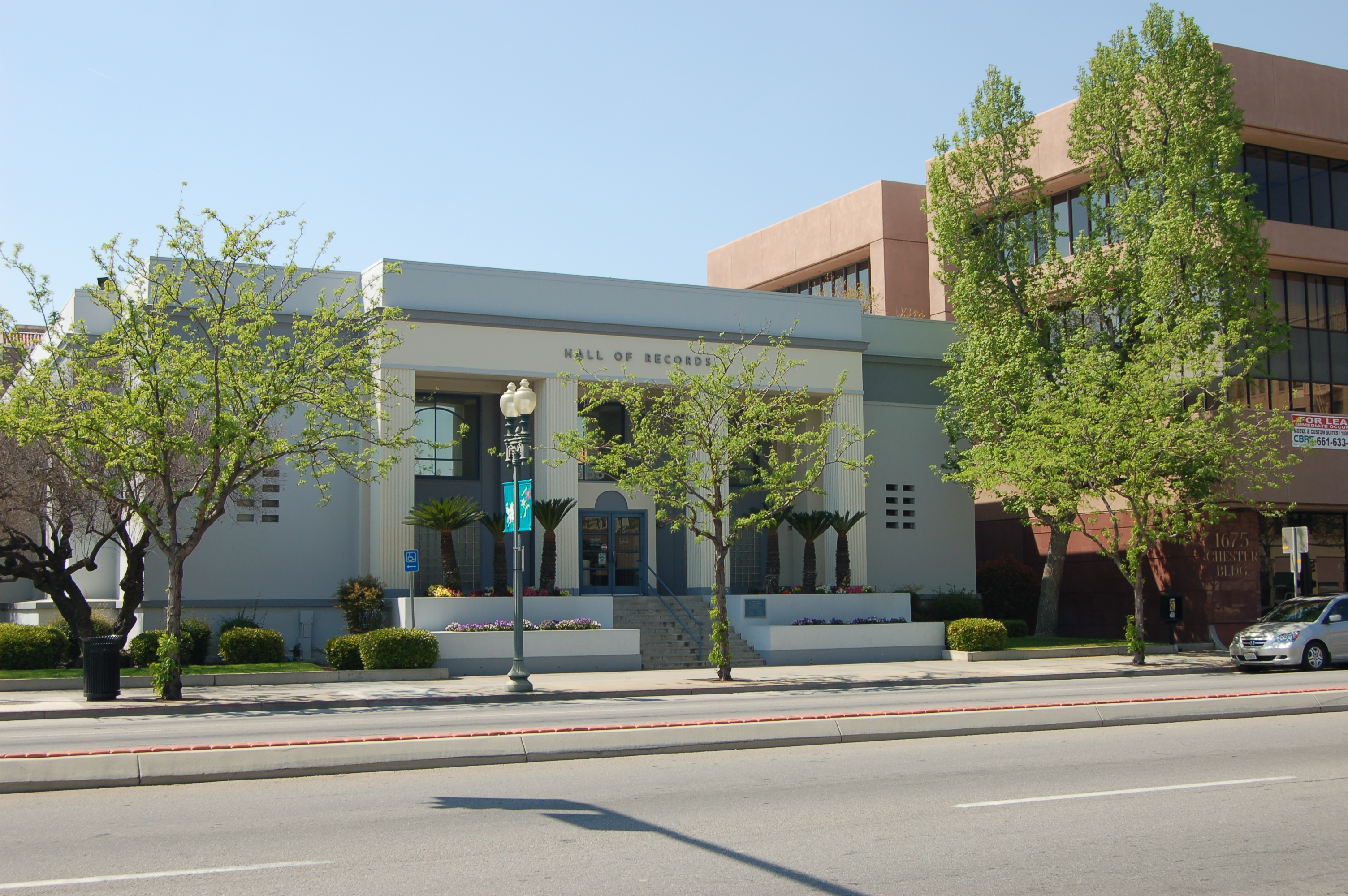
- Kern County Hall of Records

General information
- Type: Government Records Repository
- Architectural style: Beaux Arts (1909), PWA Moderne (1939)
- Location: Bakersfield, California
- Address: 1655 Chester Avenue
- Coordinates: 35.37363°N 119.01921°W
- Completed: 1909
- Renovated: 1988
- Owner: County of Kern

Design and construction
- Architect(s): Train & Williams (1909), Chris Brewer(1939)

Renovating team
- Architect(s): Bill Tuculet
- Renovating firm: Klassen Corporation

Website
- recorder.co.kern.ca.us

References
- The Bakersfield Californian

The Kern County Hall of Records is a government building in Bakersfield, California. It is the repository of records for Kern County. The building is located in the Civic Center, Downtown. Constructed in 1909, it is the longest continuously used government building in the county. It is also one of the few government buildings to survive the 1952 earthquake.

== History ==
Originally the Kern County Courthouse was the repository of records in the county. However, by the mid-1900s, more room was needed to store the records. The Hall of Records building was constructed in 1909, across the street from the courthouse (which is where City Hall is located today). The structure was designed in the Beaux Arts style by Robert Train and Robert Williams. The structure had large windows, and a rotunda.

There was a flaw in the design. The large windows and rotunda would collect and trap heat. By 1939, it was decided to remodel the structure. The county also changed its architectural standards for government buildings. In 1939, architect Francis W. Wynkoop was hired. The structure would be remodeled into the PWA Moderne style. The rotunda was covered up and the statues on the roof were removed. The size of the windows was reduced and replaced with an increased use of electric lighting. Most of the intricate exterior design features were covered over.

In 1988, the building was renovated. Architect Bill Tuculet and Klassen Corporation was hired for the reconstruction. The building was repainted in the original multi-color design (at some point it was repainted completely white). Also, storm doors were added to the front of the structure.
