= Frank A. Forster House =

- U.S. National Register of Historic Places
- San Juan Capistrano Historic And Cultural Landmark
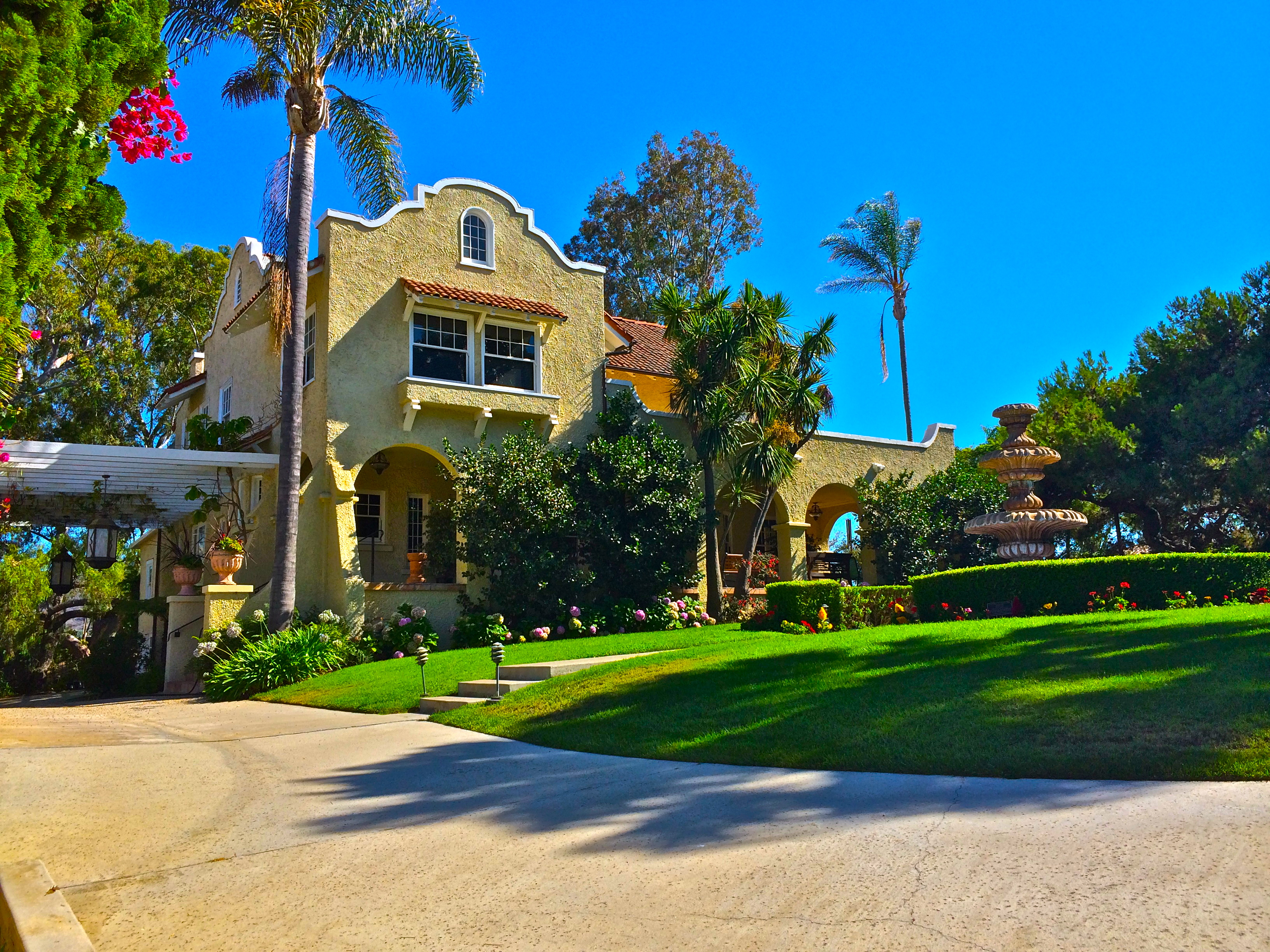
- Frank A. Forster House

- Location within California Location within the United States
- Nearest city: San Juan Capistrano, California
- Coordinates: 33.5025°N 117.655278°W
- Area: 6,000 square feet (560 m^{2})
- Architect: Train & Williams
- Architectural style: Mission Revival
- NRHP reference No.: 86002405
- Added to NRHP: September 11, 1986

The Frank A. Forster House in San Juan Capistrano, California is a 6,000-square-foot (560 m^{2}) stucco, Spanish tile roofed mansion built in 1910 for $10,000 by Frank Ambrosio Foster, grandson of rancher John (Don Juan) Forster. It is the only remaining home of its style and era in the area. It was designed as a 5-bedroom, 1-bathroom home in the Mission Revival style by Los Angeles architects Robert Farquhar Train and Robert Edmund Williams. Upon the deaths of Frank and his wife Ada, their daughter Alice Forster Leck inherited the house, and bequeathed it to her nephew Pancho Forster.

The property changed owners in 1975, and was purchased as a fixer-upper in 1983 by interior designer Martha Gresham, who traded two Porterville ranches for the house. It came with a legend of a ghost, nicknamed "George the Ghost" by Gresham. She spent $350,000 restoring the mansion, and used it as a home and office until 1990 when she sold it to photographer Phillip Stewart Charis.

The mansion is a San Juan Capistrano Historic and Cultural Landmark. It was added to the National Register of Historic Places listings in Orange County, California in 1986.
