= Holmes-Shannon House =

Historic house in California, United States

- U.S. National Register of Historic Places
- Los Angeles Historic-Cultural Monument
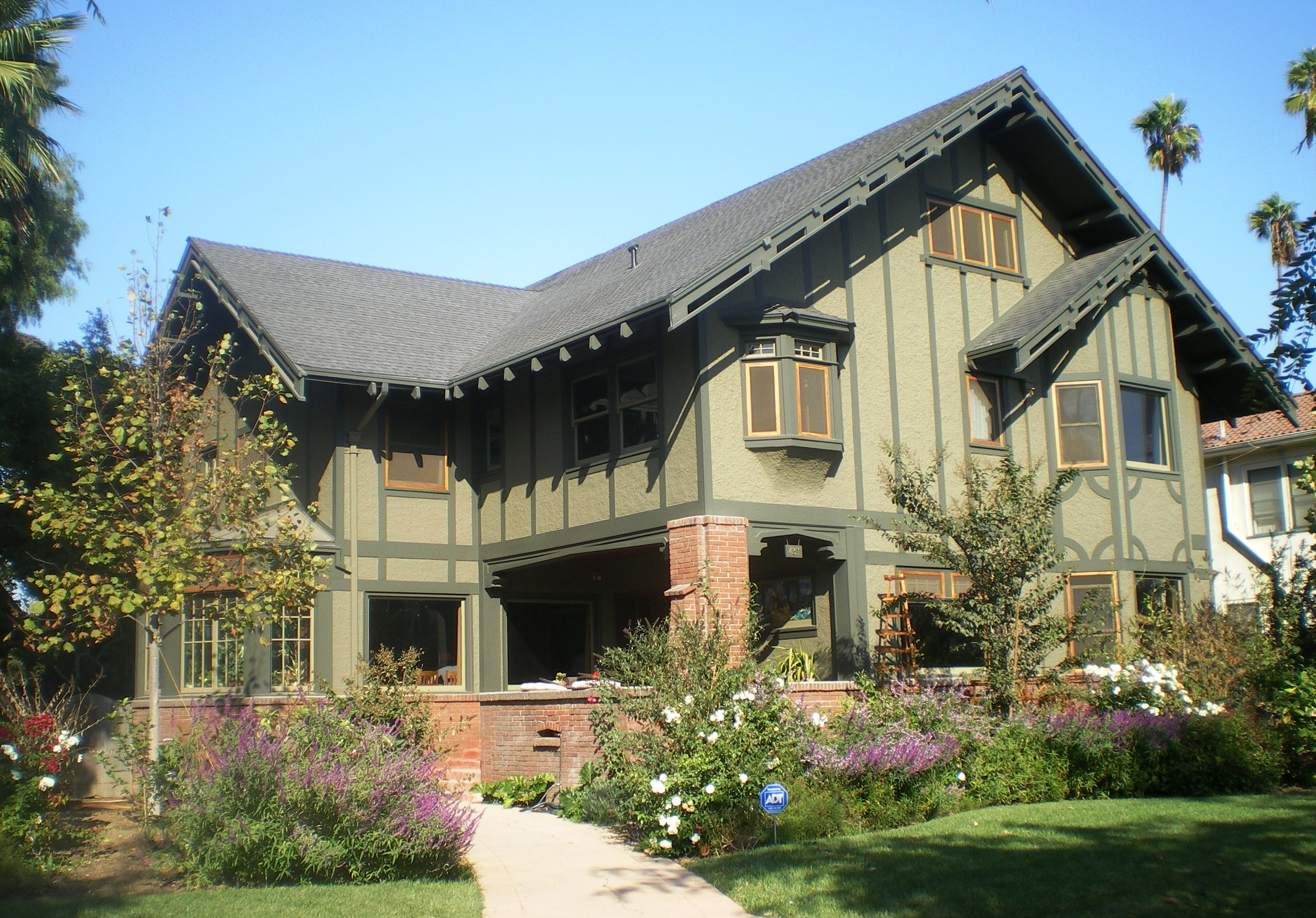
- Holmes-Shannon House, May 2008

- Location within the Los Angeles metropolitan area Location within California Location within the United States
- Location: 4311 Victoria Park Drive, Victoria Park, Los Angeles, California
- Coordinates: 34°2′48″N 118°19′42″W
- Built: 1911
- Architect: Train & Williams
- Architectural style: American Craftsman-Bungalow
- NRHP reference No.: 08000202
- LAHCM No.: 885

Significant dates
- Added to NRHP: March 26, 2008
- Designated LAHCM: 2007-08-15

The Holmes-Shannon House is a Craftsman style home with Tudor influences in Los Angeles, California.

== History ==
It was built in 1911 in the Victoria Park neighborhood of Los Angeles, California. Designed by Robert Farquhar Train and Robert Edmund Williams, the house was listed on the National Register of Historic Places in March 2008 based on its well-preserved Craftsman architecture. It is also listed as a Historic-Cultural Monument by the City of Los Angeles Cultural Heritage Commission, which described it as "a residential building designed in the Tudor-Craftsman style by a prominent firm and reflective of the development of Victoria Park".

== In media ==
- Modern Family (2012 episode) - The interior was used in the fourth season episode "Open House of Horrors". (The exterior was shot at the Miller and Herriott House in North University Park.)

== See also ==
- National Register of Historic Places listings in Los Angeles
- List of Los Angeles Historic-Cultural Monuments in the Wilshire and Westlake areas
- Victoria Park, Los Angeles
