= Civic Center, Bakersfield =

Civic Center
- District of Bakersfield
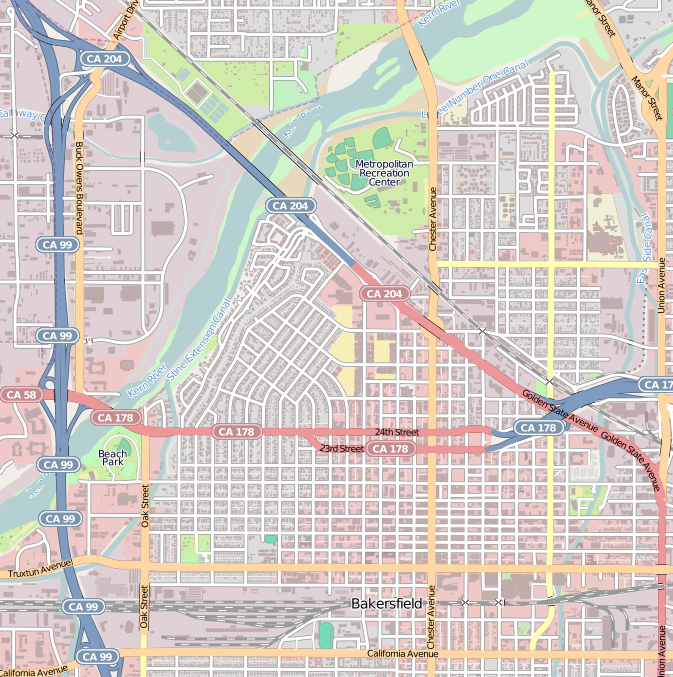
- Location within Downtown Bakersfield Civic Center (California)
- Coordinates: 35°22′24″N 119°1′8″W
- Country: United States
- State: California
- County: Kern County
- City: Bakersfield

Civic Center is a district in Downtown Bakersfield, California. It is the center of government for the City of Bakersfield and the County of Kern, containing a collection of buildings used by the city, county, state, and federal governments. The district also contains all of downtown's sporting complexes. It also has the Rabobank Theater and Convention Center, which is the largest theater and convention facilities in the city.

== Government buildings ==
- Bakersfield Police Department
- Centennial Center (federal)
- City Hall North (Bakersfield)
- City Hall South (Bakersfield)
- County of Kern Administrative Center
- Development Services Building (Bakersfield)
- Hall of Records (Kern County)
- Kern County Child Protective Services/Forensic Science
- Kern County Superintendent of Schools
- Municipal Courthouse (Kern County)
- Superior Courthouse (Kern County)

Note: Some government agencies use rented space within the district, instead of owning their own building.

== Sports complexes ==
- Bakersfield Ice Sports Center
- McMurtrey Aquatic Center
- Dignity Health Arena

== Theaters ==
- Rabobank Theater and Convention Center
