= Judson Studios =

Stained glass studio in Los Angeles, California

- U.S. National Register of Historic Places
- Los Angeles Historic-Cultural Monument
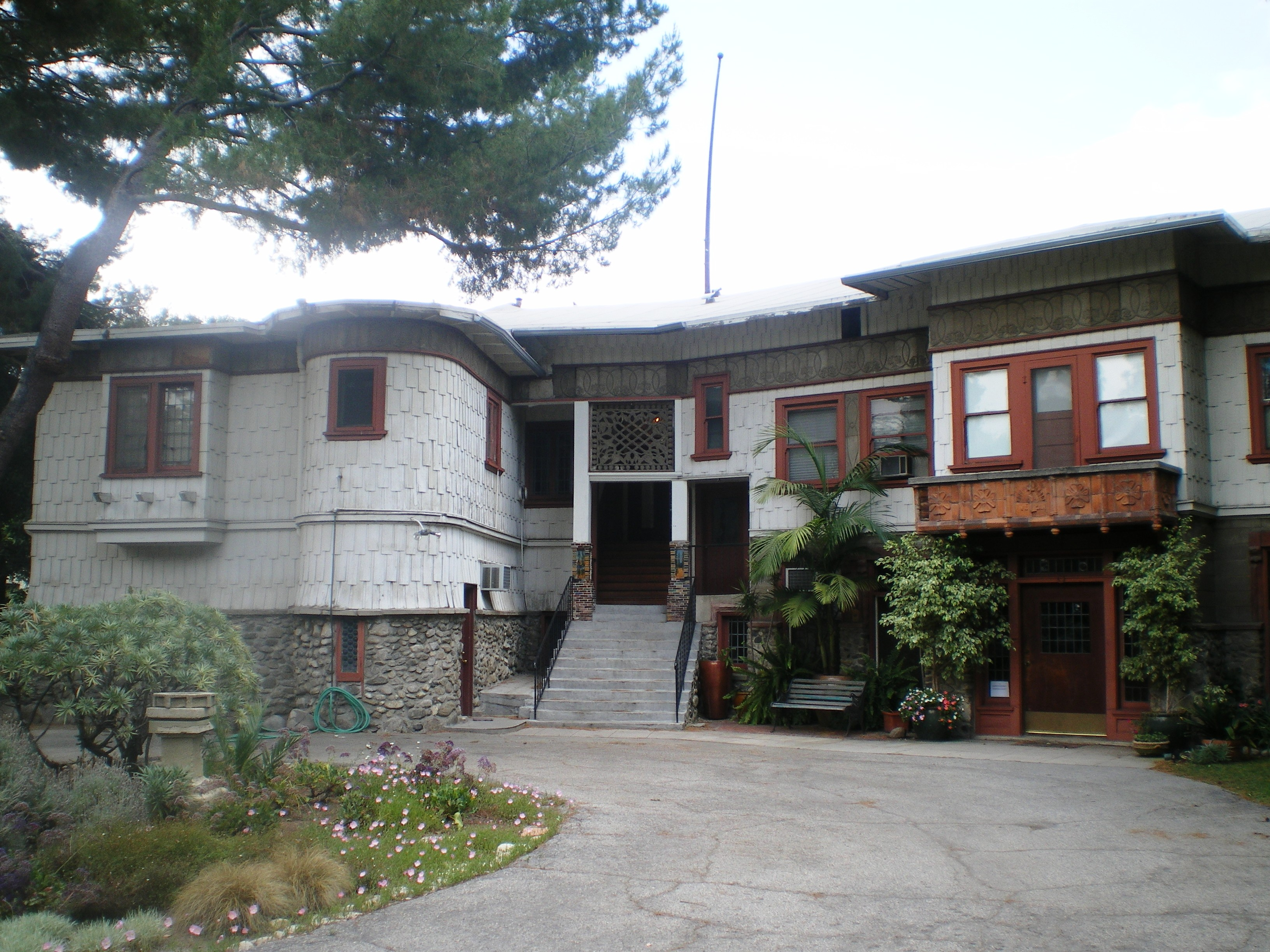
- Judson Studios, May 2008

- Location within the Los Angeles metropolitan area Location within California Location within the United States
- Location: 200 S. Avenue 66, Highland Park, Los Angeles, California
- Coordinates: 34°6′49″N 118°10′43″W
- Built: 1911
- Architect: Train & Williams
- Architectural style: Shingle Style American Craftsman—Bungalow
- NRHP reference No.: 99000370
- LAHCM No.: 62

Significant dates
- Added to NRHP: March 25, 1999
- Designated LAHCM: August 31, 1969

Judson Studios is a fine arts studio specializing in stained glass located in the Highland Park section (also known as Garvanza) of northeast Los Angeles. The stained glass studio was founded in the Mott Alley section of downtown Los Angeles in the mid-1890s by English-born artist William Lees Judson and his three sons. It moved to its current location in 1920 and remains in operation as a family-run business. The Judson Studios building was named a Historic-Cultural Landmark by the City of Los Angeles in 1969 and listed in the National Register of Historic Places in 1999.

== Founder William Lees Judson ==
William Lees Judson was born in 1842 in Manchester, England, and moved to the United States with his parents when he was ten years old. After serving four years with the Illinois volunteers during the American Civil War, Judson studied art in New York and Paris. He settled in London, Ontario, where he became a successful portrait painter and art teacher.

He moved to Chicago in 1890 but, suffering from failing health, he moved to Los Angeles in 1893. He settled on the banks of the Arroyo Seco in the Garvanza section of Los Angeles and became part of an influential scene of artists of the Arroyo. A 1937 radio program noted that it was "love at first sight" when Judson saw the Arroyo Seco; he made the area his home for the rest of his life. Soon after his arrival, Judson was at the forefront of the Arroyo Guild of Craftsmen, a group of artists, sculptors and architects who fueled Southern California's Arts and Crafts Movement. The beauty of the area stirred Judson to switch from portrait painting to landscapes.

His work attracted such favorable attention that in 1896 he was offered a professorship in drawing and painting at the University of Southern California. In the late 1890s, he founded the Los Angeles College of Fine Arts at his home in Garvanza (the present location of Judson Studios). He died at his home in the studio building in October 1928.

== Formation of Judson Studios ==
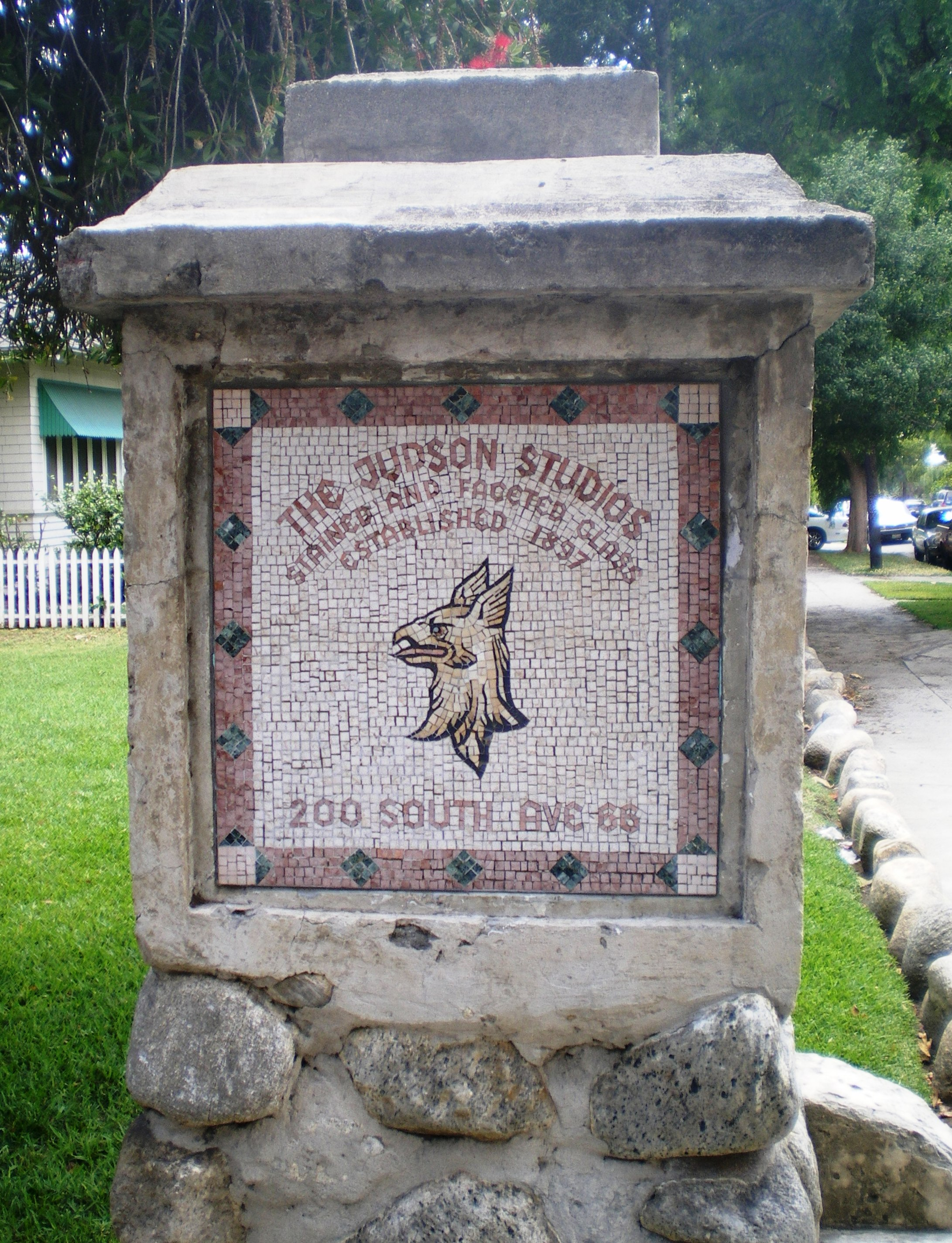
Judson Studios logo mosaic

After settling in Los Angeles, William Lees Judson saw the need for a local stained glass studio. In 1895, he persuaded three of his sons, Walter H., Lionel and Paul, to come to Los Angeles to join him in starting a stained glass studio. The family initially opened its stained glass business under the name Colonial Art Glass Co., in Mott Alley, located near the Old Plaza and Union Station in an area that was later demolished for the construction of the Hollywood Freeway.

In the studios' early years, its stained glass output was "balanced between religious and secular, between recreating the Gothic effect and working for Frank Lloyd Wright in glass and tile on the Ennis and Barnsdall Houses." In addition to stained glass, the Judsons also worked in tile and mosaic. The Judson operation became so highly regarded that it was able to recruit such major artists as A.E. Brain and Frederick Wilson away from America's premiere maker of stained glass, Louis Comfort Tiffany.

== College of Fine Arts ==
Judson started as a professor at McLeod's Los Angeles School of Art and Design. According to a radio broadcast transcript Judson's own art college became USC's College of Fine Arts and Judson moved the college to the building near his home in the Arroyo area in 1901. Other sources claim the school was in the Highland Park location from 1897 to 1920. He became Dean of the USC College of Fine Arts in 1913, and remained so until his retirement in 1922.

== Original building ==
The original three-story Islamic-style building on the Garvanza site was used as the campus for the USC College of Fine Arts starting in 1901. In December 1910, the building was destroyed by a fire that destroyed Judson's art works. Judson escaped from the burning building through a window and met his classes that day under the pepper trees on the property.

== New facility built in 1911 ==
After fire destroyed the original building, a "rambling, two-story building" designed by Robert Train and Robert Edmund Williams was built on the site in 1911. The new building was the home of the USC College of Fine Arts until 1920, when USC moved the arts school to the central campus. With USC vacating the space, Judson Studios moved into the building. In its early years, the building was also the headquarters for a group called the Arroyo Craftsmen who made furniture and art objects for fine homes built in the area until World War I, including work fabricated for noted Arts and Crafts architects, Greene and Greene. Frequent visitors to the building included Frank Lloyd Wright, Ernest A. Batchelder and Henry and Charles Greene.

== Operations of the studios ==
When Walter H. Judson died in 1934, Horace T. Judson (grandson of William Lees) took over the day-to-day management of the business. Trained as a lawyer, Horace Judson retired from the active practice of law to continue the family's stained glass tradition. The studios were described in 1940 as "a medieval guild secluded from a hectic modern world by the vine-covered building." At the time, Horace Judson told the Highland Park News-Herald: "Here there is no rush. We work slowly and for perfection as they did six centuries ago."

As Southern California's population grew rapidly after World War II, there was a tremendous demand for church construction. This in turn led to a boom in business for Judson Studios. At the peak in the 1950s, Judson employed 30 craftsmen. Walter W. Judson later recalled, "It got so it almost became counterproductive. It was difficult to keep track of what was going on." As a result, Horace Judson established a rule that the studio would never again employ more than 15 craftsmen at once. Walter Judson, who took over the business from Horace (his father) in the 1970s, continued that rule, noting, "If you go over 15, you'll make more money. But you can lose your reputation too."

In 1973, Walter Judson noted that they preferred to train their own craftsmen and that it was difficult to find people fully interested in the craft: "They just want to play with it and then go off." By 1981, Judson Studios was still using "the old methods that have yet to be improved." Walter Judson noted, "We do use a lot more electricity and glass costs a lot more but that's about all that's changed." At the time, Judson was using glass from all over the world in more than 600 colors.

When the Los Angeles Times did a profile on the studios in 1986, there were nine artisans employed in the business, "employing techniques that have not changed much since the craft began to flourish in the 12th Century." In 1991, Walter Judson offered his opinion that contemporary stained-glass craftsmanship surpassed even the heyday of the art in the 11th and 12th centuries. He later added, "It's a unique business, because you're producing something that is a joy and a beauty to other people and it will be for centuries."

Though principally known for stained glass, Judson Studios also creates works in marble carving, mosaic, carved and etched glass, furniture and other specialty items.

As of 2017, Judson Studios remained a family-owned and operated business, with fifth generation David Judson, the great-great-grandson of William Lee Judson serving as the director of the business. In 2000, David Judson reported that 85% of the company's work was for religious institutions "of all different creeds, from Jewish to Christian to Islamic."

== Demolition threat and historic designation ==
Judson Studios was operated from 1920 to 1969 as a non-conforming use within a residential neighborhood. As a zoning variance neared its termination in 1969, the Judson family feared that the city would require demolition of the studios. In order to preserve the studios, the Los Angeles Cultural Heritage Board, with support from the Judson family, declared the building a Los Angeles Historic-Cultural Monument (No. 62) in August 1969. The declaration of historic status stated:

Judson Studios have been responsible for the creation of outstanding stained glass windows for countless churches, chapels and other structures throughout the United States and foreign countries. Judson Studios, one of the largest in the nation and probably the largest on the west coast, have remained in the family since the beginning, contributing greatly to the artistic and cultural development of Los Angeles.

The building was added to the National Register of Historic Places in 1999.

== Examples of Judson stained glass ==
Over its first century of operation, Judson Studios produced more than 10,000 stained-glass works. Stained glass made at Judson Studios can be found in locations throughout Southern California and the United States. Examples can be seen at:

- Hollyhock House at Barnsdall Art Park and Ennis House—Judson Studios provided leaded and stained glass and tiles for Frank Lloyd Wright's work on the Hollyhock and Ennis Houses
- The rotunda skylight at the Natural History Museum in Los Angeles
- The "Congressional Prayer Room", also known as the "Chapel of All Creeds", at the U.S. Capitol
- The United States Air Force Academy Cadet Chapel in Colorado Springs, Colorado
- Chapel One at Edwards Air Force Base in California
- The Alumni Memorial Window, done in heraldic style, at the Memorial Branch Library on Olympic Boulevard in Los Angeles, commemorating the alumni of Los Angeles High School who died in World War I
- The massive interior dome – 107 by 35 feet (33 by 11 m) – at the Tropicana Resort & Casino in Las Vegas, built at a cost of $200,000
- The 30-foot (9.1 m) Jewel Court Dome at South Coast Plaza in Costa Mesa, California
- The Caesars Palace Palace Court dome in Las Vegas
- Sun City Ginza in Tokyo
- Mary, Queen of the Universe Shrine in Orlando, Florida, for which Judson produced 94 stained-glass windows
- Highland Park Presbyterian Church in Los Angeles
- St. James' Episcopal Church in South Pasadena
- All Saints Church in Pasadena
- First Congregational Church in Los Angeles

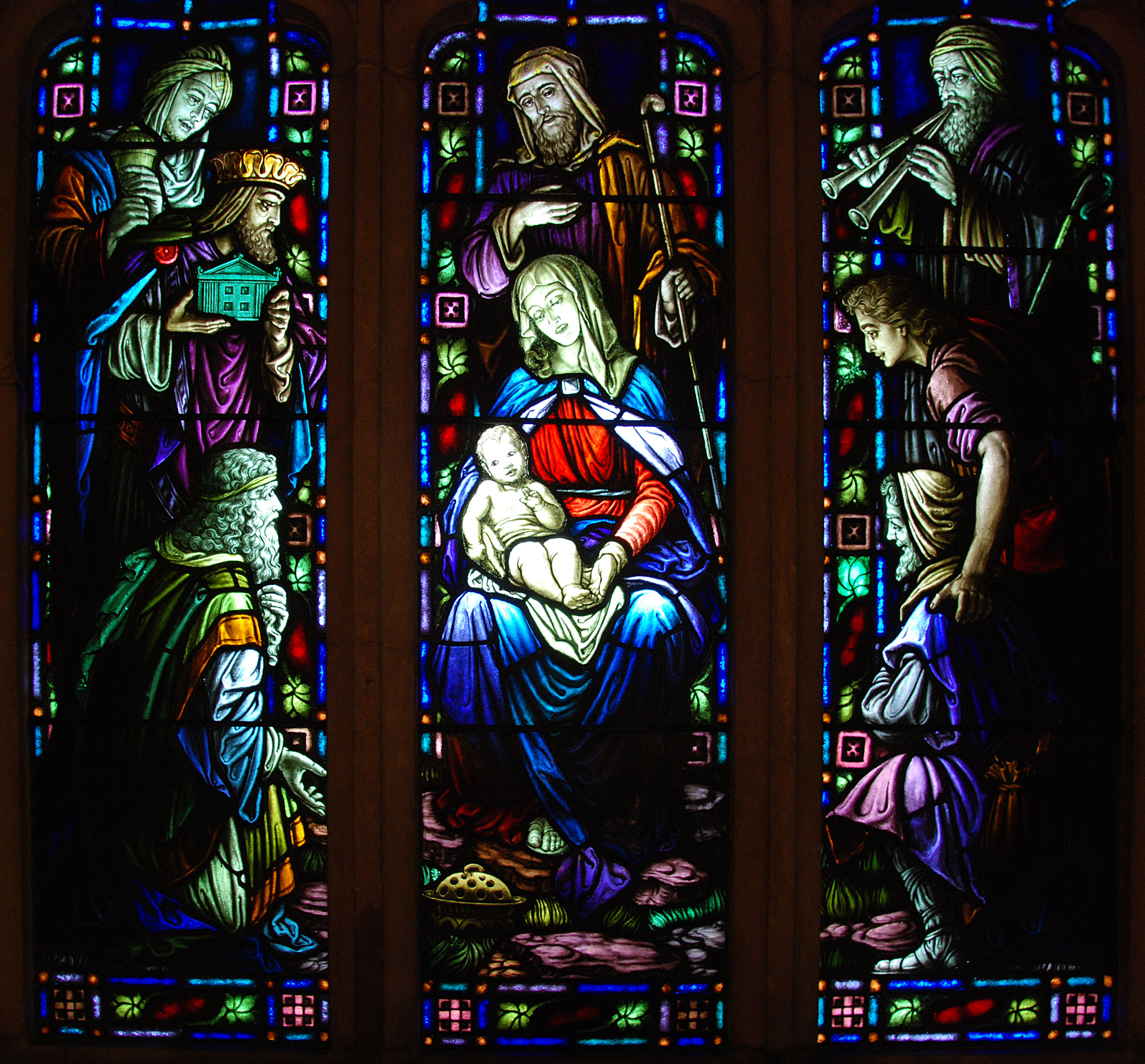
Circa 1925 Judson Studios work at nearby Calvary Presbyterian Church, South Pasadena

- Calvary Presbyterian Church in South Pasadena (See image to the right) Viewable outside at night
- Westminster Presbyterian Church in Los Angeles. Judson of Los Angeles designed the stained glass windows in 1930 for the newly built former St. Paul Presbyterian Church at 2230 West Jefferson Blvd.
- "The Life of Christ" window series at St. Barnabas Church in Eagle Rock
- The Stanford Court Hotel in Nob Hill section of San Francisco
- A heraldic design featuring white lions and tigers for Las Vegas illusionists Siegfried & Roy
- Toluca Lake United Methodist Church in North Hollywood, where Judson began making stained glass windows in 1958 and was still installing windows in 1992
- The 36-foot (11 m) high Great Window at Glendale Presbyterian Church in Glendale, California (completed in 1974), with a Pentecost theme, dominated by a large figure of Christ, populated by people of different ethnic backgrounds rooted in the trunk of a tree of life
- The tree of life window in the Lopaty Chapel at Valley Beth Shalom in Encino, California, made from 20,000 pieces of glass, with 613 leaves on the tree
- The Arbor of Light Radiance Corridor at the Mountain View Mausoleum in Altadena, California
- The Diamond Head Mortuary in Honolulu, Hawaii
- The Goldman Estate in Honolulu
- Honolulu International Country Club
- All Saints Episcopal Church, San Diego, stained glass work completed between 1957 and 1967

=== Church of the Resurrection ===
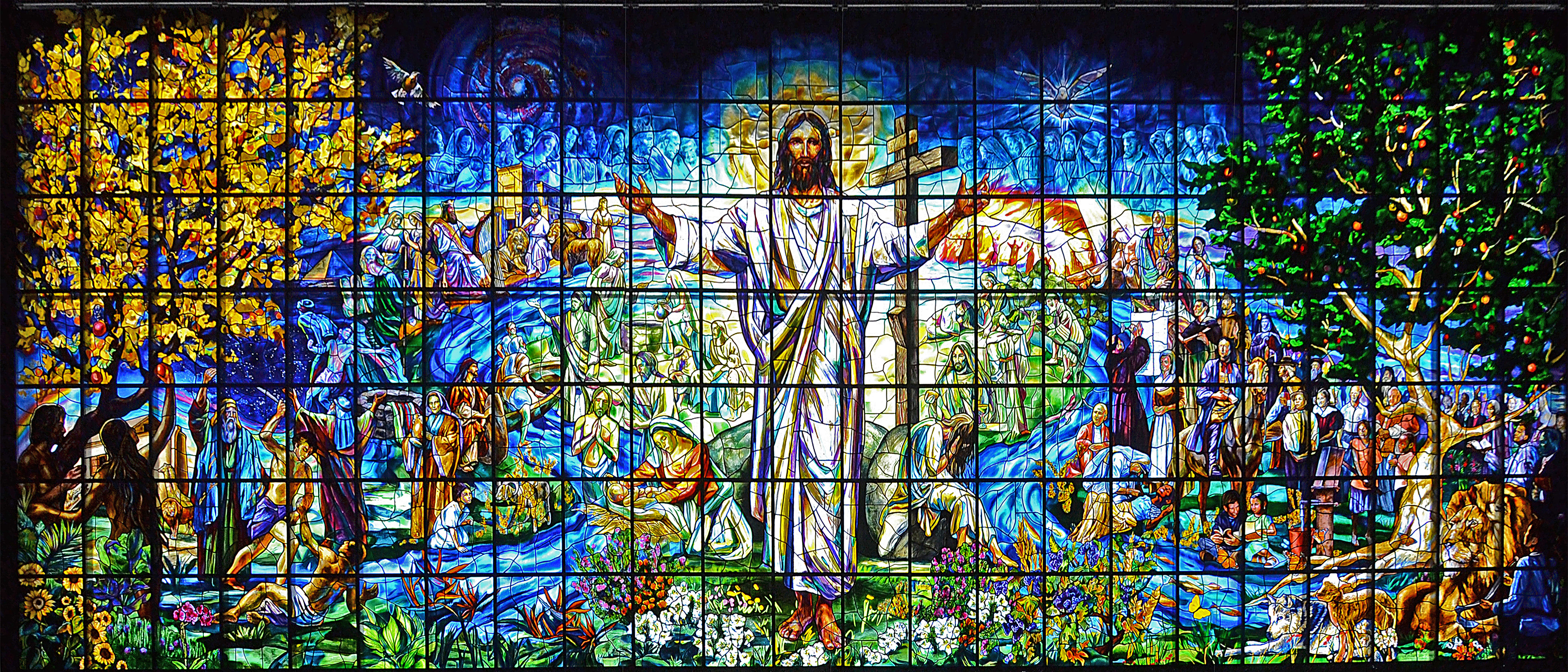
Judson Studios monumental work at the United Methodist Church of the Resurrection, Leawood, Kansas: A Story of Three Gardens

This new work is Judson Studios' most ambitious both in size and technical difficulty. New techniques using fused glass were developed for it, as well as a new facility being built in order to accomplish the task in nearby South Pasadena.

== Public activities ==
The Judson Gallery hosts changing art exhibits that are open to the public. The Studios also offers 1-hour tours of the workshops and galleries for $20 per person every second Thursday of the month.

== See also ==
- List of Los Angeles Historic-Cultural Monuments on the East and Northeast Sides
- National Register of Historic Places listings in Los Angeles
