= Garrick Theatre (Los Angeles) =

Former movie theater in Los Angeles, California

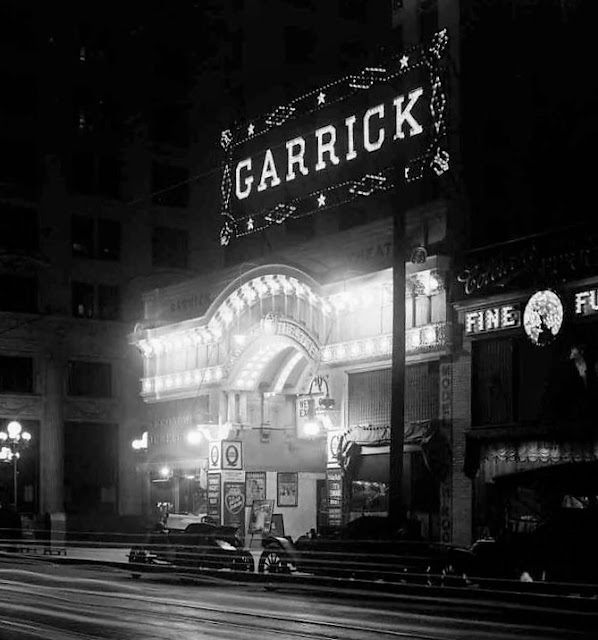
- The theater in 1913
- Interactive map of Garrick Theatre
- Former names: Hyman Theatre
- Address: 802 South Broadway, Los Angeles
- Coordinates: 34.0437°N 118.2547°W
- Capacity: 900
- Type: live theater converted to movie theater
- Screen: 1

Construction
- Built: 1910 or 1911
- Renovated: 1921
- Demolished: 1927 or earlier
- Architects: Train and Williams; George Edwin Bergstrom (1921 remodel)

Garrick Theatre, previously Hyman Theatre, also known as Quinn's Garrick and The Garrick, was a movie theater located at 802 South Broadway in downtown Los Angeles.

== History ==
Hyman Theatre was designed by Train and Williams for Arthur S. Hyman and built in or after 1910. The theater was renamed Garrick Theatre in 1911. It sat 900 and was originally built for live theater.

The theater was purchased by John Archibald Quinn prior to 1914, at which point it was converted to a movie theater. Tickets originally sold for five cents ($1.61 in 2025) and the theater was immensely popular; as a result, evening prices were doubled for orchestra seats and tripled for loges.

The theater was remodeled by George Edwin Bergstrom at a cost of $20,000 in 1921 ($361,007 in 2025). It was demolished and replaced by Tower Theatre in 1927. Herman Louis Gumbiner owned both Tower Theater and Garrick Theatre when the latter was demolished.

== Design ==
The theater's floor was covered with velvet carpet, the seats were upholstered in leather, and the drapes made of silk velour.
