= Train & Williams =

American architectural partnership

Train & Williams was an architecture partnership in Los Angeles, California. A major contributor to the Arts and Crafts movement, several of the firm's works are listed as Los Angeles Historic-Cultural Monuments and/or in the National Register of Historic Places.

== Partners ==
=== Robert Farquhar Train ===
Robert Farquhar Train
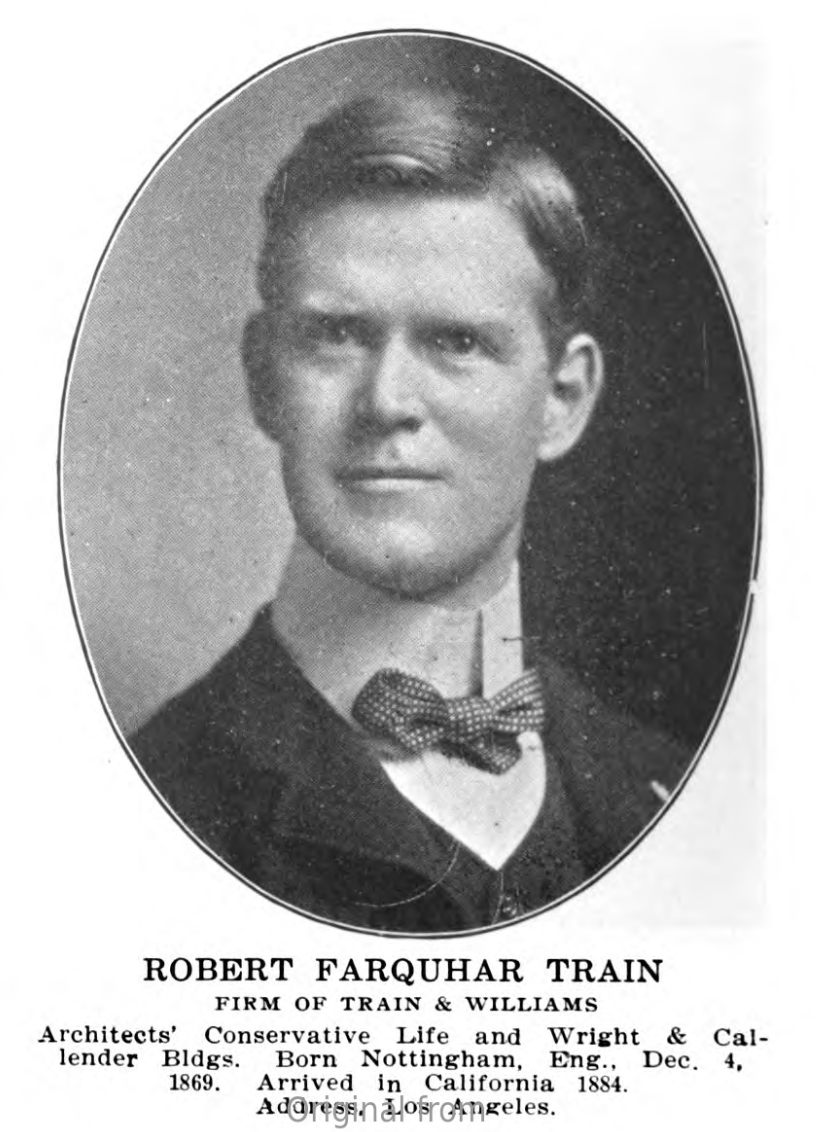
- Born: December 4, 1869; Nottingham, Nottinghamshire, England
- Died: January 10, 1951 (aged 81); Los Angeles County, California
- Education: University of Illinois Urbana-Champaign
- Occupation: Architect
- Practice: Howard & Train (1894-1901); Howard, Train & Williams (1901-1903); Train & Williams (1903-1926+)

Robert Farquhar Train was born in 1869 in Nottingham, Nottinghamshire, England to John Farquhar Train, a commercial traveler, and Elizabeth (Hood) Train. John died in 1872 and Elizabeth in 1883. Robert had one older brother, and also grew up living with two aunts and one servant.

Train immigrated to the United States in 1884, first living in Illinois and Nebraska, then in Denver and Colorado Springs, Colorado, where he worked as a draughtsman. He studied architectural engineering at University of Illinois Urbana-Champaign, where he helped design the World's Columbian Exposition.

Train moved to Los Angeles in 1894, where he started a partnership with G. A. Howard Jr. Train became a naturalized citizen in 1895 and in 1897, he married Vera May Creeth.

According to Los Angeles voter rolls, Train was six feet tall, had blue eyes and light-colored hair, and was a lifelong Republican.

=== Robert Edmund Williams ===
Robert Edmund Williams
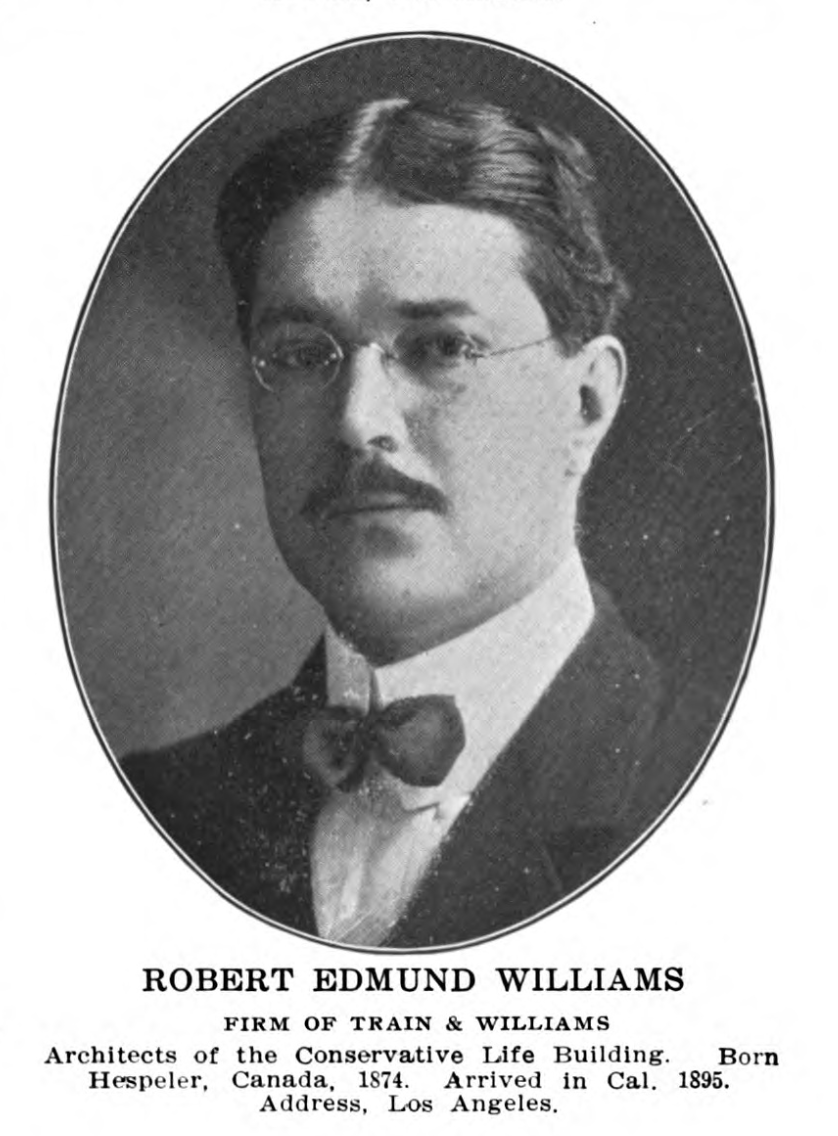
- Born: January 16, 1874; Hespeler, Ontario, Canada
- Died: 1960 (aged 85–86); Tustin, Orange County, California
- Occupation: Architect
- Practice: Howard, Train & Williams (1901-1903); Train & Williams (1903-1926+)

Robert Edmund Williams was born in 1874 in Hespeler, Ontario, Canada to William Williams, a clergyman, and Mary Burman Williams. Robert moved to Los Angeles, California in 1895, one year after his brother and four years before his parents.

Robert married Annie Pierce, year unknown, and by 1930 he was married to Jean K. Williams. Robert and Jean had one daughter, born in 1925. Robert died in Tustin, Orange County, California in 1960.

=== Partnership ===
In 1894, Train partnered with G. A. Howard Jr. Williams joined in 1901 and Howard left two years later, resulting in the partnership Train & Williams. Train & Williams was located in the Rindge Building on Broadway in downtown Los Angeles. In 1910, Train & Williams opened a branch office in Taft, California. The partnership is considered one of the major contributors to the Arts and Crafts movement.

== Selected works ==
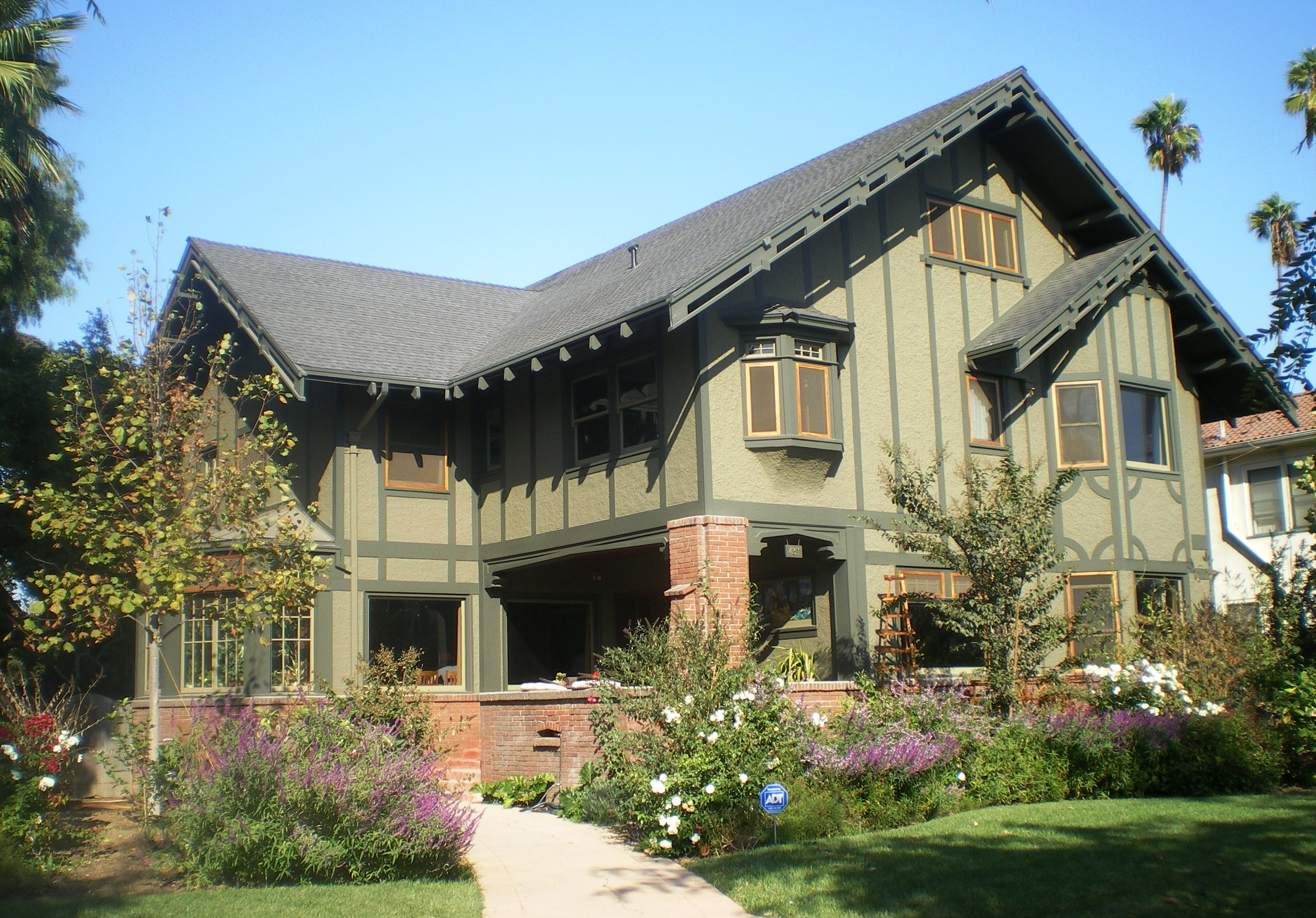
Holmes-Shannon House

Train and Williams's most notable works were done during their partnership. These works include:

=== Los Angeles ===
==== Historic-Cultural Monuments ====
- Robert Edmund Williams House (1905), LAHCM No. 411
- Angels Flight redesign (1910), NRHP No. 00001168, LAHCM No. 4
- Holmes-Shannon House (1911), NRHP No. 08000202, LAHCM No. 885

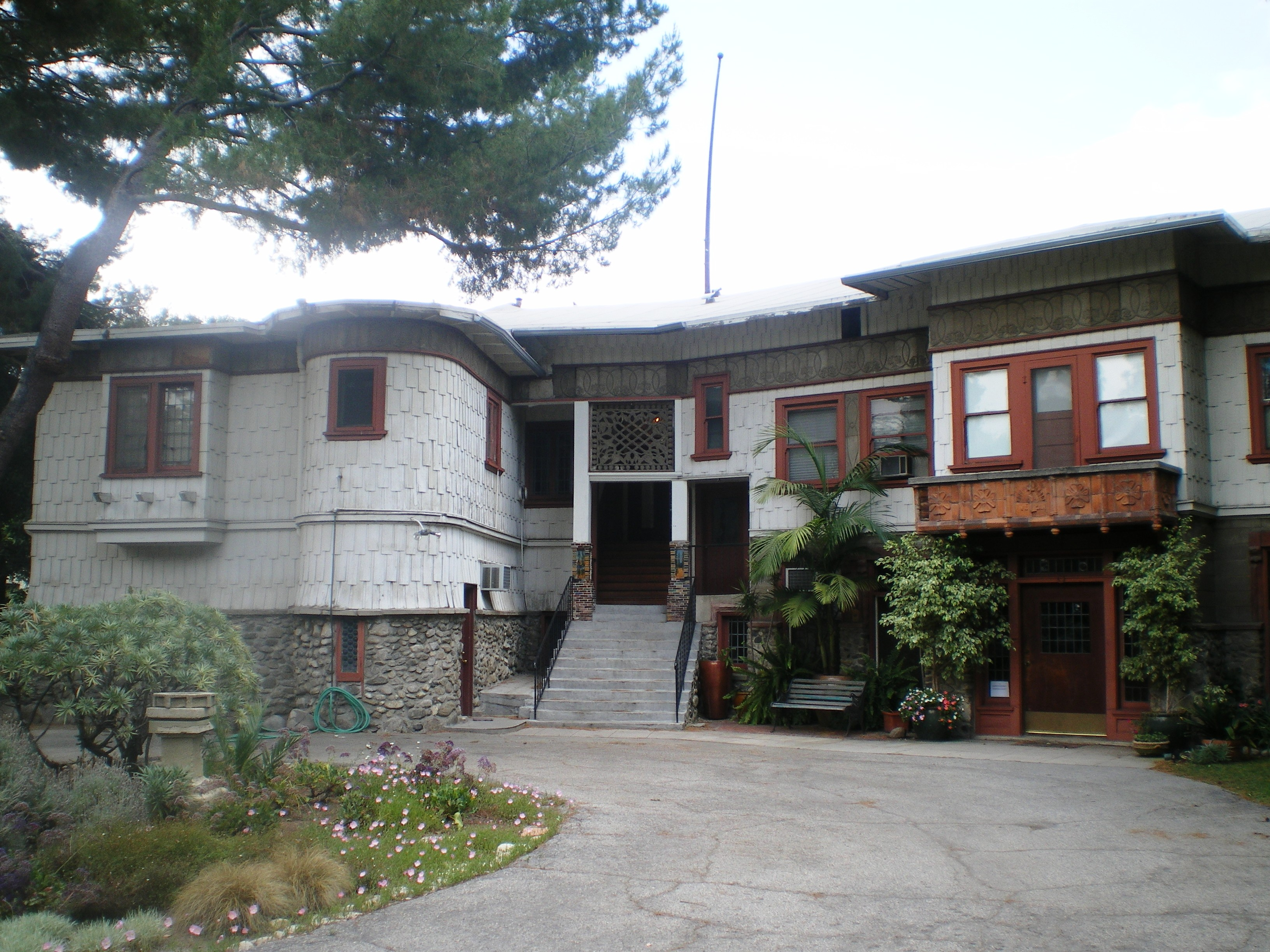
Judson Studios

- Judson Studios (1911), NRHP No. 99000370, LAHCM No. 62
- Lucy E. Wheeler/Martin E. Weil House (1917 additions), LAHCM No. 991

==== Other ====
- Conservative Life Insurance Company Office Building (with Howard) (1901-1902)
- First Congregational Church (1902), demolished early 1930s
- Allen House (1902)
- Los Angeles Furniture Company Building (1904)
- Carlton Building (1907)
- Pythian Castle Hall (1908)
- University of Southern California's Administration Building and first general campus plan (1910)
- Hyman Theatre (1910 or 1911), demolished by 1927
- Woodley Theatre (1913), demolished 1925

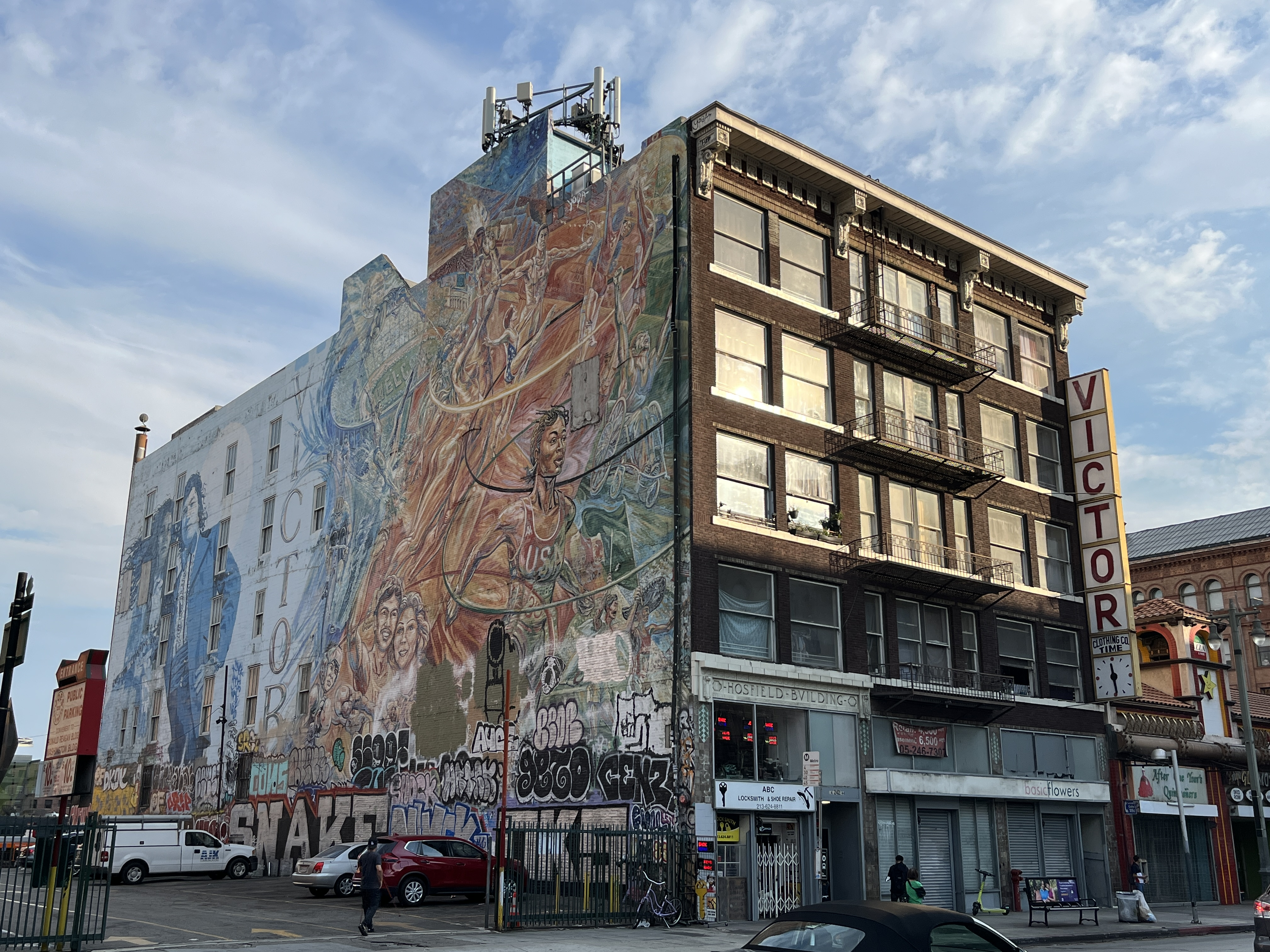
Victor Clothing Company Building

- Victor Clothing Company Building (1914), contributing property in the Broadway Theater and Commercial District
- Arroyo Seco Branch Library (1914)
- Diamond Laundry Company Building (1917)
- Plaza Methodist Church (1925-1926)
- Los Angeles Stock Exchange

=== Elsewhere in California ===
- Masonic Building, Esperanza Lodge No. 339 (with Howard), Fullerton (1901-1902)

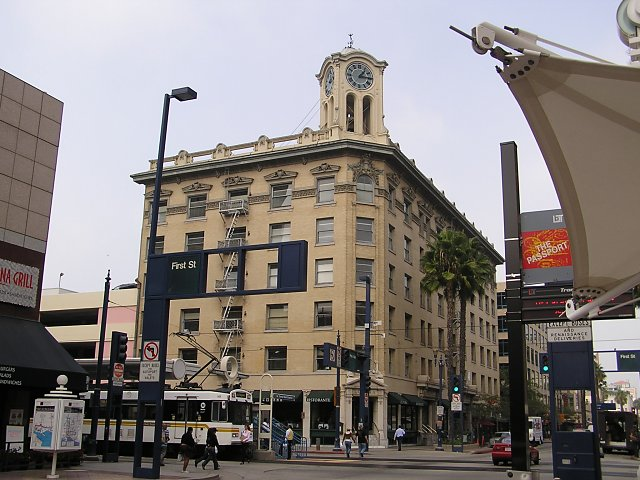
First National Bank of Long Beach

- First National Bank of Long Beach (1906), NRHP No. 90001432
- Kern County Hall of Records, Bakersfield (1908-1909)
- J.W. Jamieson Hotel, Taft (1910)
- Frank A. Forster House, San Juan Capistrano (1910), NRHP No. 86002405
- Strand Theatre, Pasadena (1914)
- Cawston Ostrich Farm Administration Building, Pasadena (1920)

Train also designed Bell High School in Bell, California, in 1925.

== See also ==
- List of American architects
- List of people from Los Angeles
