= Marcel Sedletzky =

American builder (1923–1995)

- Born: Marcel Eugen Sedletzky; March 29, 1923; Volgograd, Russia
- Died: 1995; Santa Fe, New Mexico, US
- Occupation: Architect
- Years active: 1958-1984
- Spouses: Gunnel Maria Roden; Barbara Carol
- Children: 3
- Buildings: Esther M. Hill House; Jackson House

Marcel Sedletzky (March 29, 1923 – 1995) was an American architect who lived in Carmel-by-the-Sea, California.

== Early life ==
During World War II, he and his mother were drafted into the Germany army and worked behind the front lines.

Eventually, in 1946, he found himself at the Technical University in Graz, Austria, where he pursued an interest in engineering and industrial design, with an emphasis on architecture. He engaged in at least one workshop with the Swiss-born architect of reinforced concrete buildings, Le Corbusier.

== Career ==
Having earned his degree in architecture, Sedletzky moved to Los Angeles, California. He joined the planning office of Victor Gruen Associates, based in Los Angeles, California.

In 1958, Sedletzky left Victor Gruen Associates and joined the small architectural firm of Robert C. Jones in Carmel-by-the-Sea, California, to be closer to his mother. Two years later, in 1960, Sedletzky left the Jones firm and joined a private architectural practice called Marcel Sedletzky:Architect & Planners at Flanders Drive, which he held for fourteen years.

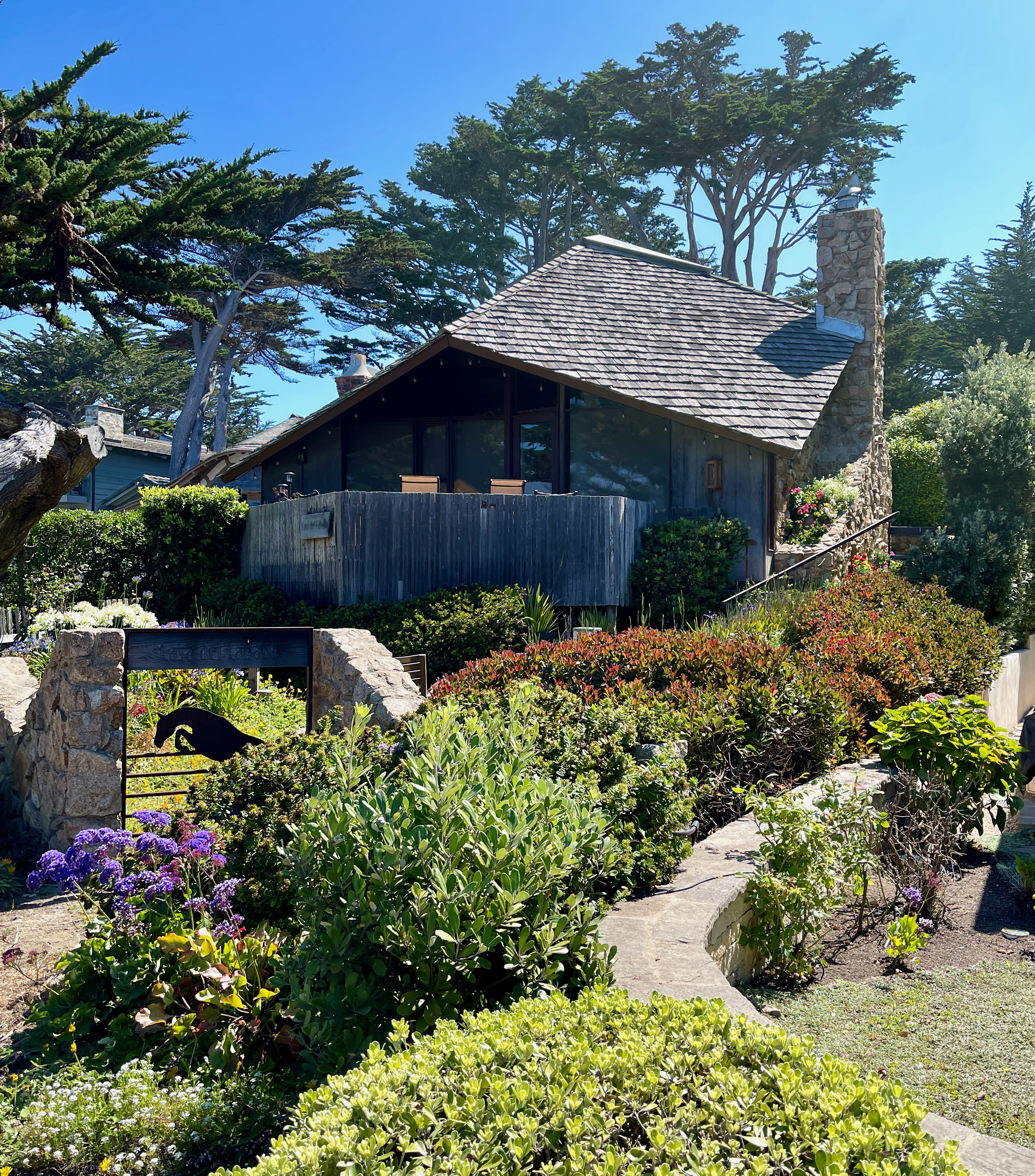
Front view of the Esther M. Hill House

The Jackson House, was built in 1962 in Carmel Meadows, overlooking Point Lobos, drawing inspiration from the architectural principles of both Le Corbusier and Frank Lloyd Wright.

In 1967 Sedletzky designed the 1500 square-foot Gansa House, with an unusual parabolic roof. The home was commissioned by Alex Gansa, a physician, as a weekend retreat for his family. To protect the house from storms, Sedletzky and a structural engineer decided to pour concrete columns in the sand.

He purchased a lot on the beach to build a house for himself and his wife, Casa Concha, in a Mexican fishing village of Bahía Kino, Sonora, Mexico. Upon retiring from teaching in 1992, they permanently moved there.

Bill Staggs wrote the book Marcel Sedletzky, Architect and Teacher, about Sedletzky and his course on architectural perspective.

Sedletzky died in 1995.
