= Kennedy Mitchell Hall of Records =

Coordinates: 41.3071°N 72.9235°W

The Kennedy Mitchell Hall of Records is located in New Haven, Connecticut and houses many of the City of New Haven's governmental functions, including finance, vital statistics, offices of the town clerk, and public hearing rooms where city policy is debated.

== Building history ==
The Hall of Records, built in 1929, was intended to be part of a larger complex of government buildings; an uncompleted end wall can be seen that was to attach it to others in the complex. Its neoclassical style differs sharply from the late-19th-century urban buildings surrounding it at the time of its construction, and from those that now neighbor it. Other New Haven landmarks built in the same architectural style include the Connecticut Savings Bank on Church Street, the former Church Street post office, and the Elm Street county courthouse.

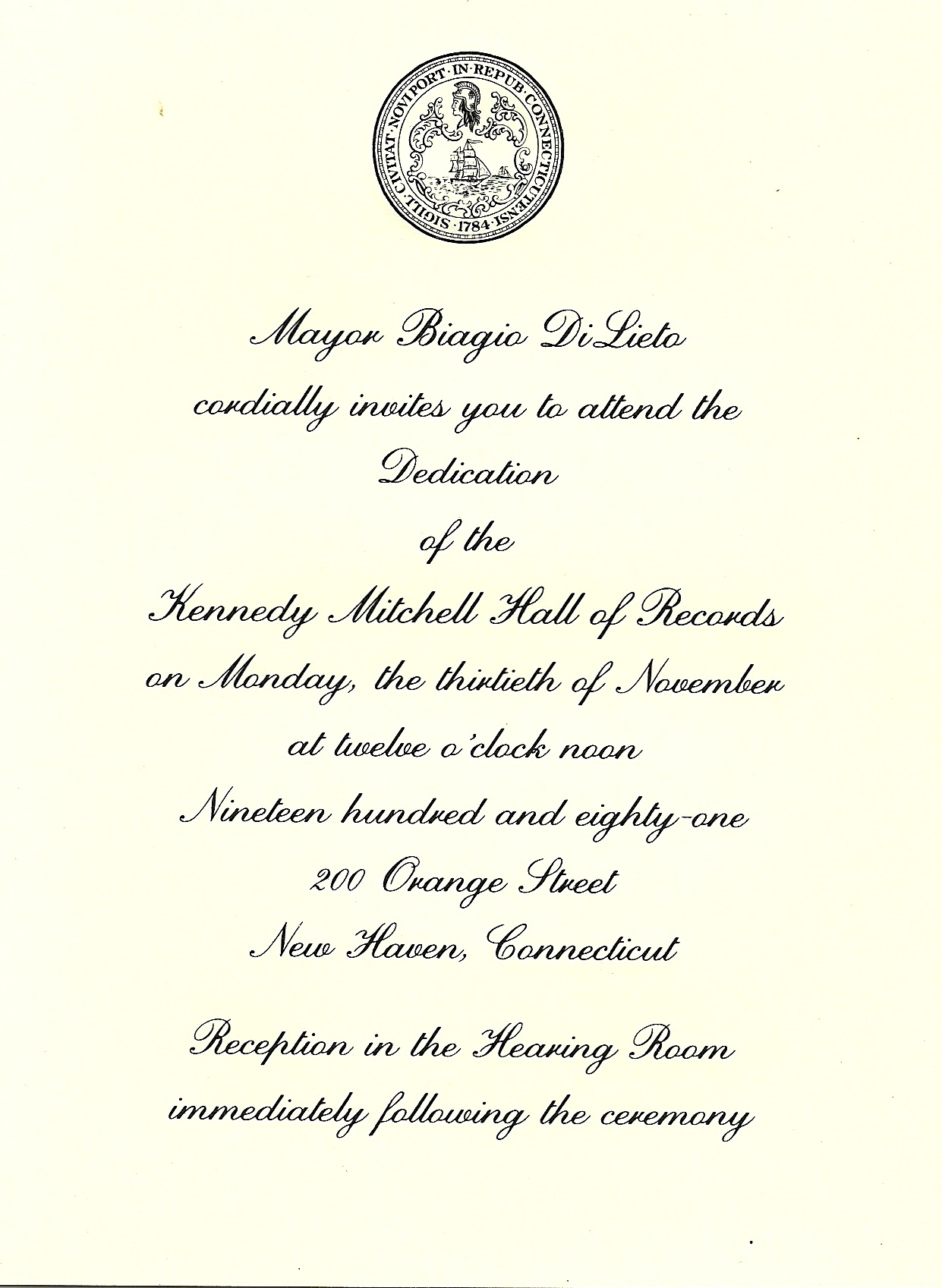
Dedication ceremony invitation

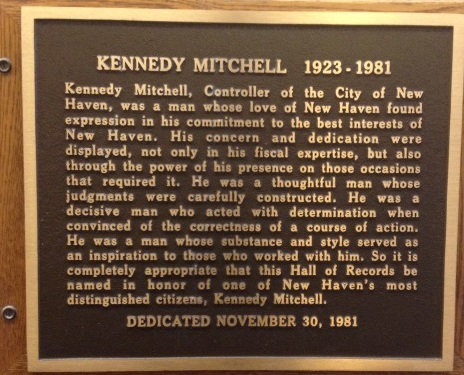
Kennedy Mitchell

== Dedication ==
On November 13, 1981, following the death of long-time city finance Controller Kennedy Mitchell, the building was officially dedicated and named the "Kennedy Mitchell Hall of Records." Kennedy Mitchell was a member of the city government who directed the financial workings of New Haven, Connecticut under four mayoral administrations. A plaque within the building lobby states his dedication to city service and that he was one of "the most distinguished citizens of the City of New Haven, Connecticut."

He was also the grandson of Connecticut Senator and Congressman William Kennedy.
