= Butterfly House (Carmel Point, California) =

Historic house in Carmel-by-the-Sea

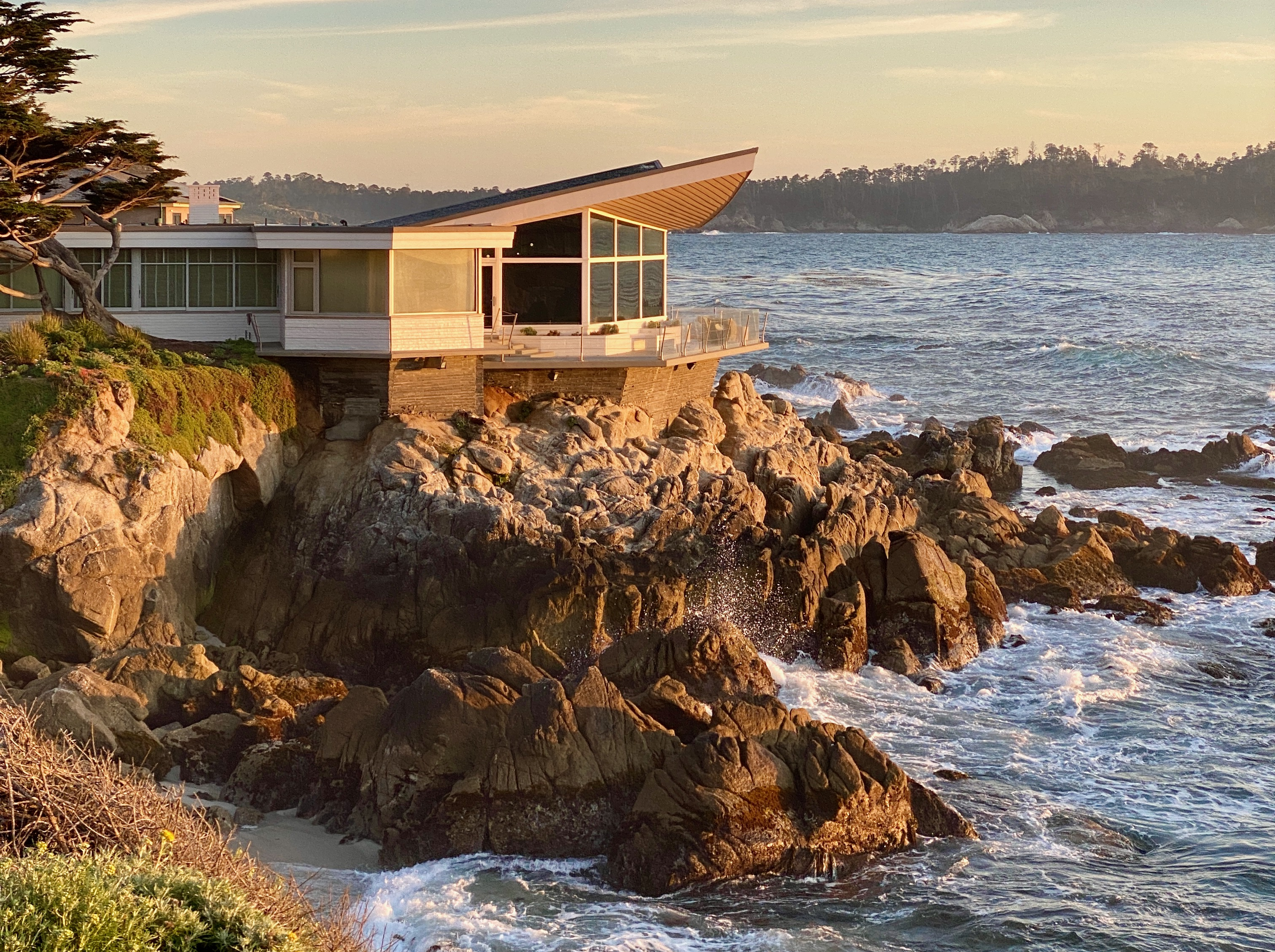
- Butterfly House in Carmel Point
- Interactive map of the Butterfly House area

General information
- Architectural style: Mid-century modern
- Location: 26320 Scenic Road, Carmel-by-the-Sea, California
- Coordinates: 36°32′28″N 121°55′58″W
- Construction started: 1950; 76 years ago
- Completed: 1952; 74 years ago

Height
- Roof: wing-shaped roof

Technical details
- Size: 3,700 square feet (340 m^{2})
- Floor count: 1

Design and construction
- Architect: Francis W. Wynkoop (1902-1978)
- Architecture firm: Francis W. Wynkoop Inc.
- Other designers: Jamie Bush & Co.

Butterfly House, is a Mid-century modern style house built in 1951 located on Carmel Point in Carmel-by-the-Sea, California. Due to its unique wing-shaped roof, this building is commonly referred to as the Butterfly House. The house was designed and built by architect Francis W. Wynkoop. It is one of the few houses that is on the rocky Carmel shoreline.

== History ==
The Butterfly House was designed and built by architect Francis W. Wynkoop (1902–1978). Construction began in 1951 and was completed in 1952. It is located on the ocean front at Carmel Point. The house underwent major renovations after it was sold in 2014.

== Architectural style ==
The Butterfly House is a 1 1/2-story, Mid-century modern-style building. It has a wing-shaped hipped roof. The house was built with a deck cantilevered out over solid granite rocks, at the edge of the breakers. Workers had to drill into the granite rock to sink caissons 5 ft (1.5 m) below the ground-level and covered them with reinforced concrete.The house is built of pumice block to blend into its surroundings.

== See also ==
- Timeline of Carmel-by-the-Sea, California
- List of Historic Buildings in Carmel-by-the-Sea
