= Bakersfield City Hall =

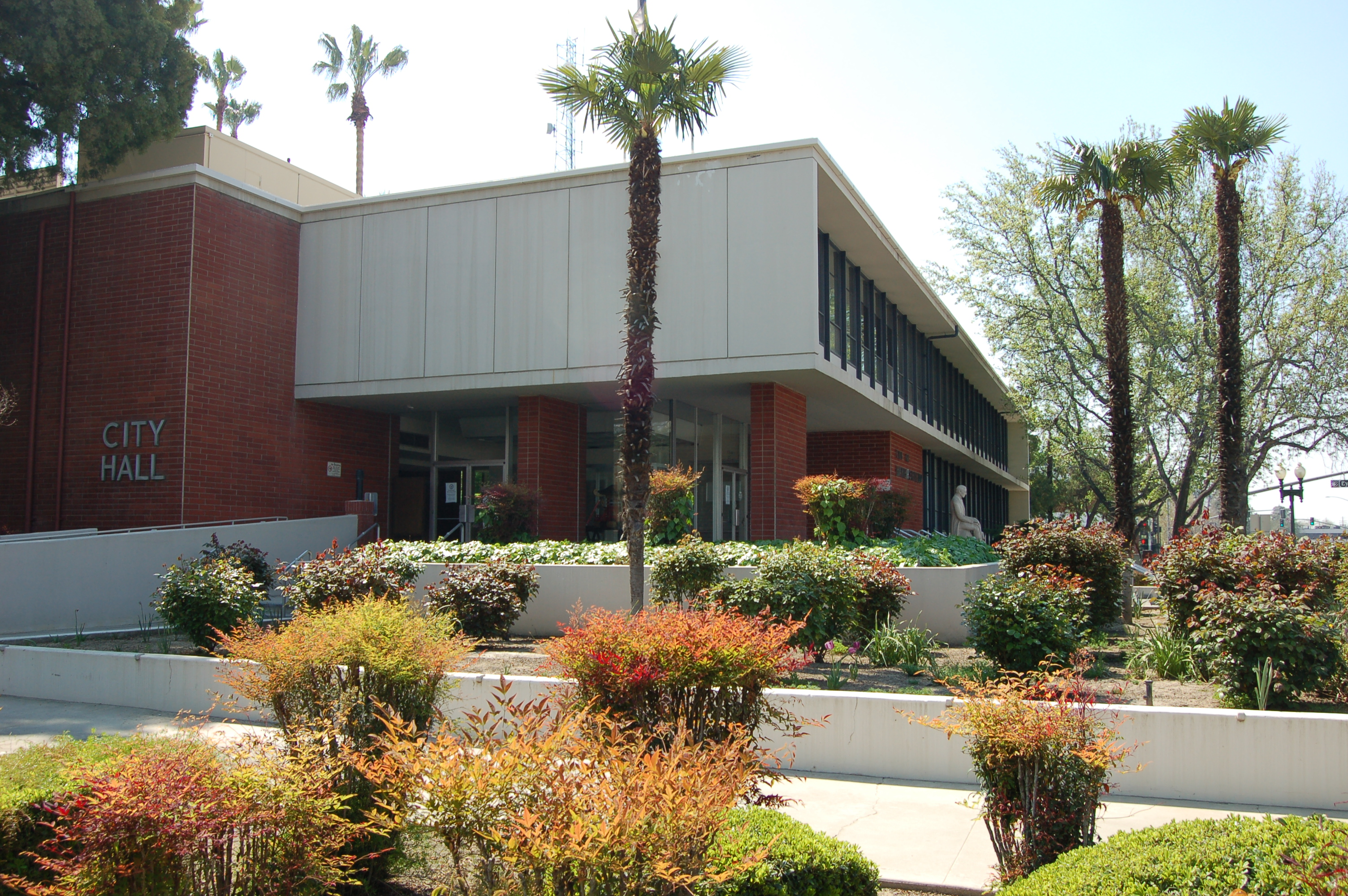
- City Hall
- Interactive map of the Bakersfield City Hall area
- Alternative names: City Hall South

General information
- Type: Seat of local government
- Location: 1501 Truxtun Avenue; Bakersfield, California
- Coordinates: 35°22′22″N 119°01′10″W
- Completed: 1954
- Owner: City of Bakersfield

Design and construction
- Architect: Robert Eddy

Colonel Thomas Baker Memorial
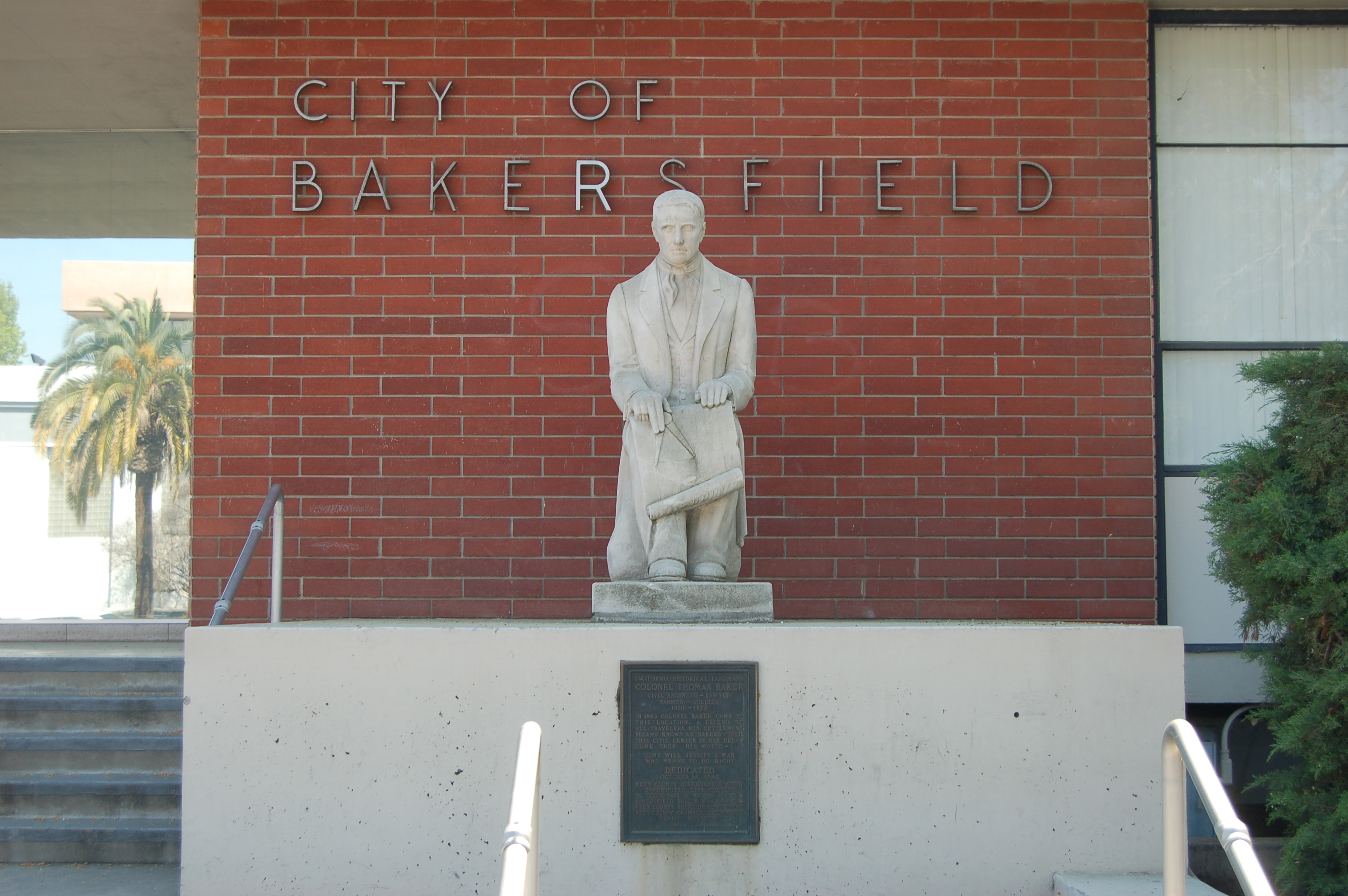
- Memorial in front of City Hall
- Interactive map of Colonel Thomas Baker Memorial

California Historical Landmark
- Designated: January 3, 1944
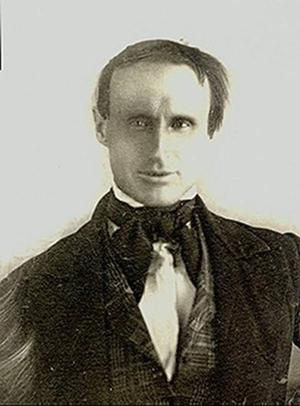
- Reference no.: 382 Colonel Thomas Baker in 1850

Bakersfield City Hall (which is also referred to as City Hall South) is the center of government for the City of Bakersfield, California. It houses the Mayor's office and the City Council chambers. It is located in the Civic Center, Downtown. A statue of Colonel Thomas Baker, the city's founder, is in front of the building and is marked as California Historical Landmark #382. Many of the city's departments and officials are located in City Hall North, which is one block west of City Hall South.

== History ==
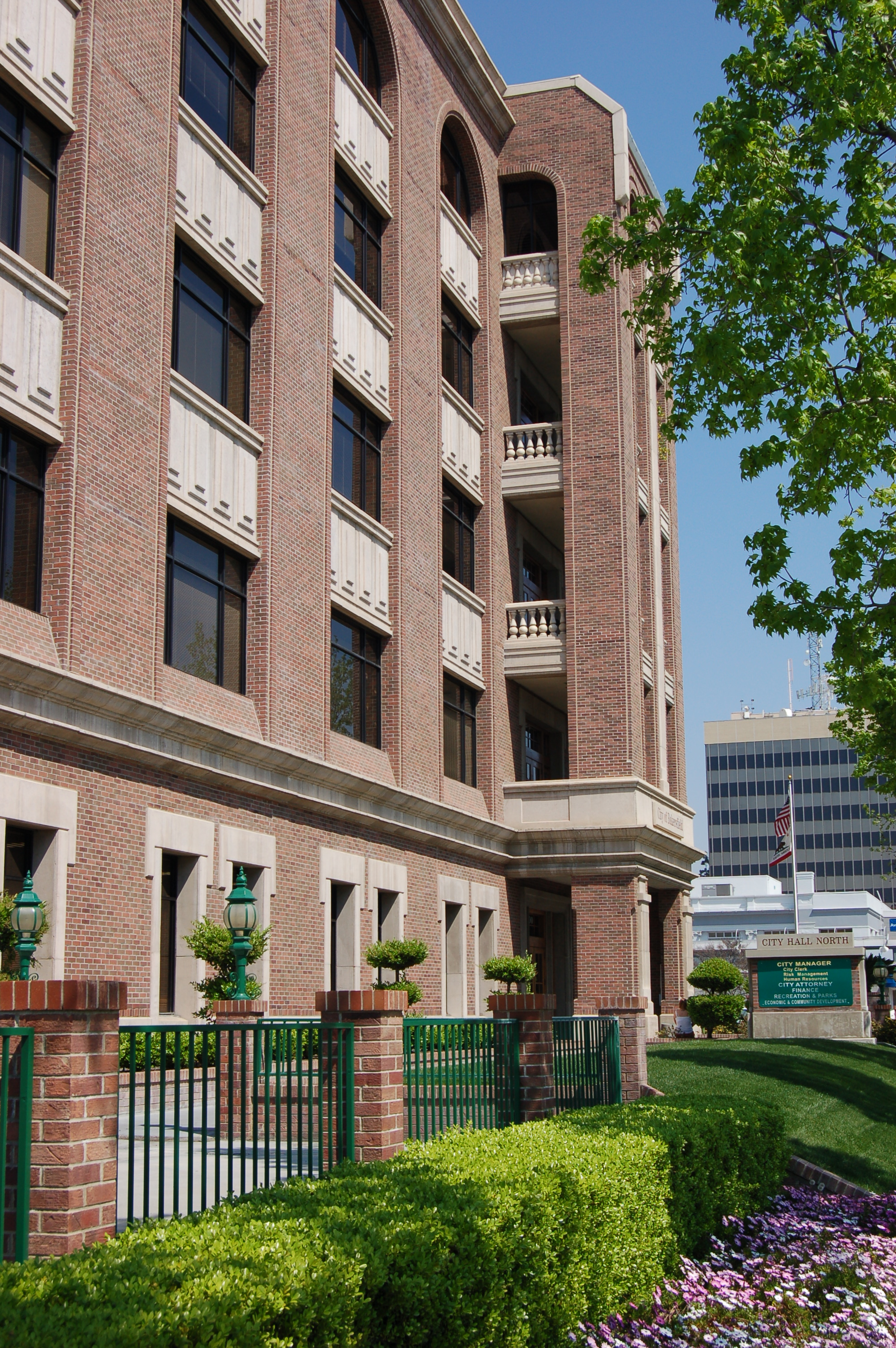
City Hall North is where many city services are located.

During the California agricultural strikes of 1933, in which mostly Mexican and Filipino agricultural strikers organized with the Cannery and Agricultural Workers' Industrial Union (CAWIU) for an increase in pay and an end to contract labor, Pedro Subia, a Mexican striker, was murdered. His funeral was held at the old Bakersfield City Hall building. As described by Chicano historian Rodolfo Acuña, "workers came from all the camps around Bakersfield to gather in his honor in front of the Bakersfield City Hall. They included 'Whites, Mexicans, and Negroes, some of them once farmers in their own right, tall fair men from the mountains of the South and their wives leading little children, some desperate, many hopeless.'"

The current City Hall was completed in 1954, after the old structure was destroyed in the 1952 Kern County earthquake. The old City Hall was too small and the city had started planning a new structure one year earlier. By the early 2000s, the city had again outgrown the existing building. Many of the city's departments and officials were at various locations throughout the city. The city decided to reconsolidate these services back to downtown.

A new building downtown was estimated to cost $18 million. Because the city was already committed to a variety of construction projects, it was decided to purchase an existing building nearby and remodel it for the city's needs. The Borton, Petrini & Conron building, constructed in 1995, was purchased for $4.5 million, and cost $1.4 million to remodel. Its name was changed to City Hall North. Many of the city's departments and officials (including the City Manager) were moved into it. The old City Hall was renamed City Hall South, although it is still the official seat of power for the city. The Mayor's office and the City Council chambers remained in the old building, as required by the City Charter. The Department of Water Resources remained at its existing location in Southwest Bakersfield.

== California Historical Landmark ==
The California Historical Landmark reads:

NO. 382 COLONEL THOMAS BAKER MEMORIAL - In 1863 Colonel Baker, friend to all travelers, came here to found 'Bakers Field.' His motto was, 'Time will justify a man who means to do right.' This civic center is his dream come true.

Col. Thomas Baker's House in 1861

== See also ==
- California Historical Landmarks in Kern County
- California Historical Landmark
