= Lerdo, California =

Unincorporated community in California, United States

Lerdo
- Unincorporated community
- Location in California Lerdo (the United States)
- Coordinates: 35°29′25″N 119°09′09″W
- Country: United States
- State: California
- County: Kern
- Elevation: 417 ft (127 m)

Lerdo (Spanish for "Dull") is an unincorporated community in Kern County, California, United States. It is located on the Southern Pacific Railroad, 12 miles (19 km) northwest of Bakersfield, at an elevation of 417 feet (127 m).

A post office operated at Lerdo from 1890 to 1894.
