= Arizona Cactus Garden =

Botanical garden in Stanford, California

Arizona Garden
- Arizona Cactus Garden
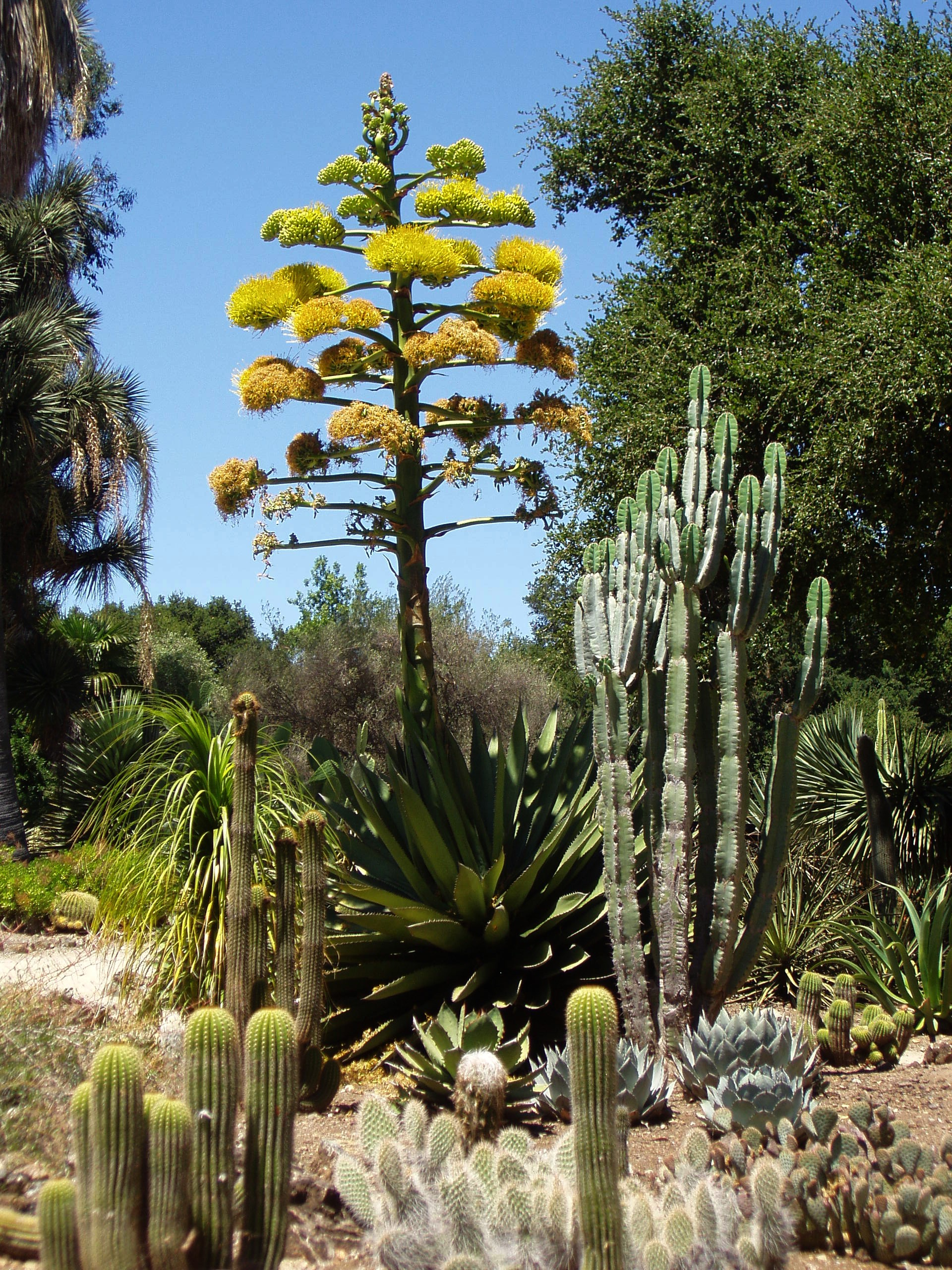
- View of Arizona Cactus Garden
- Interactive map of Arizona Garden
- Type: cactus garden
- Location: Stanford, California, United States
- Coordinates: 37°26′9.31″N 122°10′16.03″W
- Area: 17,000 square feet (0.39 acres; 1,600 m^{2})
- Created: 1883
- Designer: Rudolph Ulrich
- Owner: Stanford University
- Open: Yes

The Arizona Cactus Garden, or, officially, Arizona Garden, also known as the Cactus Garden, is a small botanical garden specializing in cactus and succulents. It is located on the campus of Stanford University (within the Stanford University Arboretum, and near the Stanford Family Mausoleum and the Angel of Grief), in Stanford, California, US. It is open to the public daily without charge.

== History ==
The garden was first planted between 1880 and 1883 for Jane and Leland Stanford to a design by landscape architect Rudolph Ulrich who specialized in "Arizona gardens" (here "Arizona" means not the state but rather "arid" so a garden for drought-tolerant plants). It was to be adjacent to their future mansion, and part of the larger gardens for the Stanford estate. However, after the death of their only child in 1884, the mansion was never built and the estate became Stanford University. The garden was regularly maintained until the maintenance gardeners originally hired by the Stanfords, Chung Wah and Ah Wah, retired in 1925 and returned to China. After, it fell into great disrepair.

In the early years of the university it was a popular place for courting couples.

== Restoration ==
Volunteer restoration work began in 1997 and is ongoing. Notwithstanding decades of neglect, some of the original plants remain. The garden now contains approximately 500 cacti and succulents in 58 beds, broadly divided into two major sections. The Eastern Hemisphere section is planted with aloes, jade plants and other succulents from Europe, Asia, and Africa, and the Western Hemisphere section holds cacti native to the Americas. Historic plants, comprising some 10-15% of the plantings, have been left in their original locations. September 2021, the plants were not labeled.

Views of the Garden
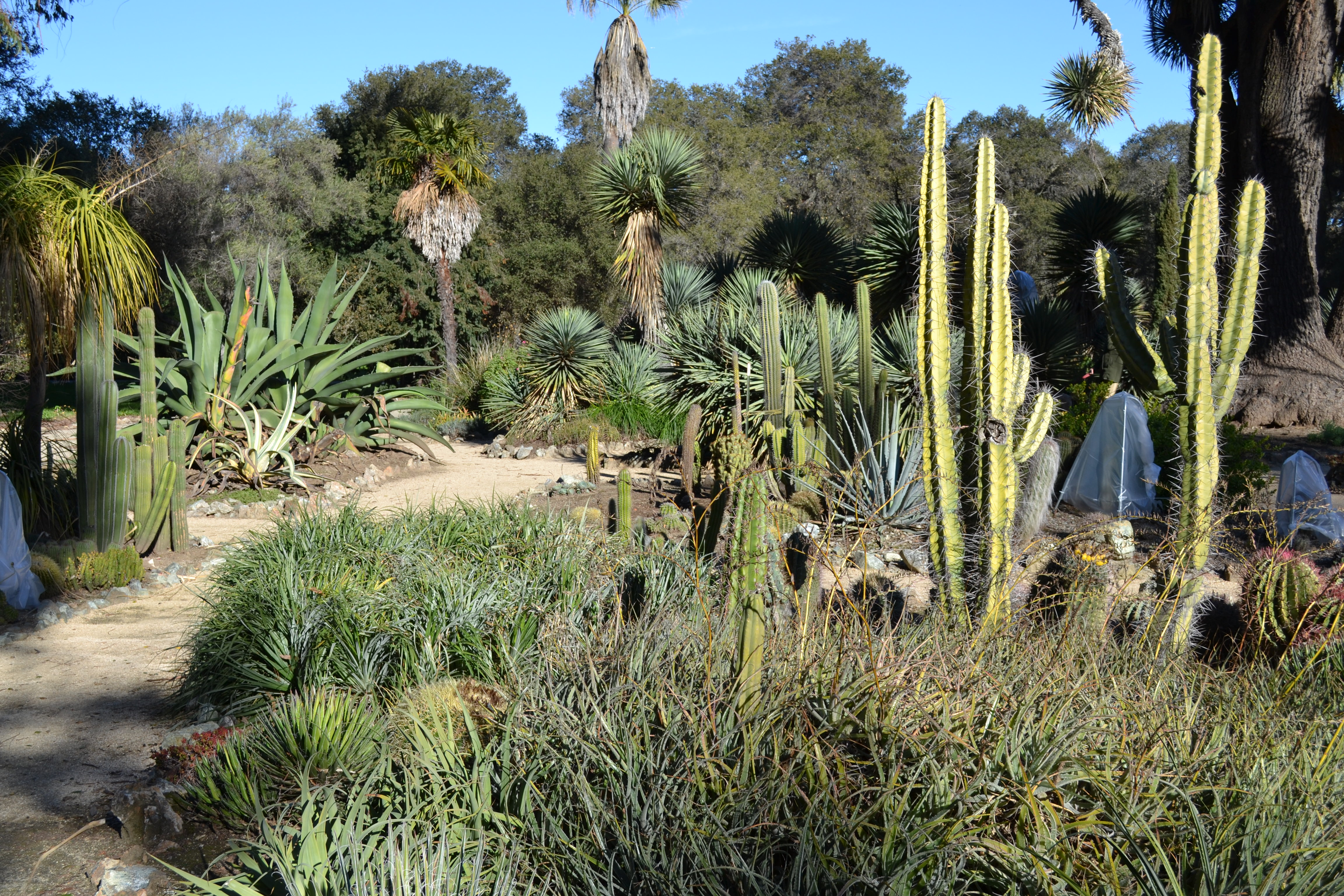
Cactus and palm tree

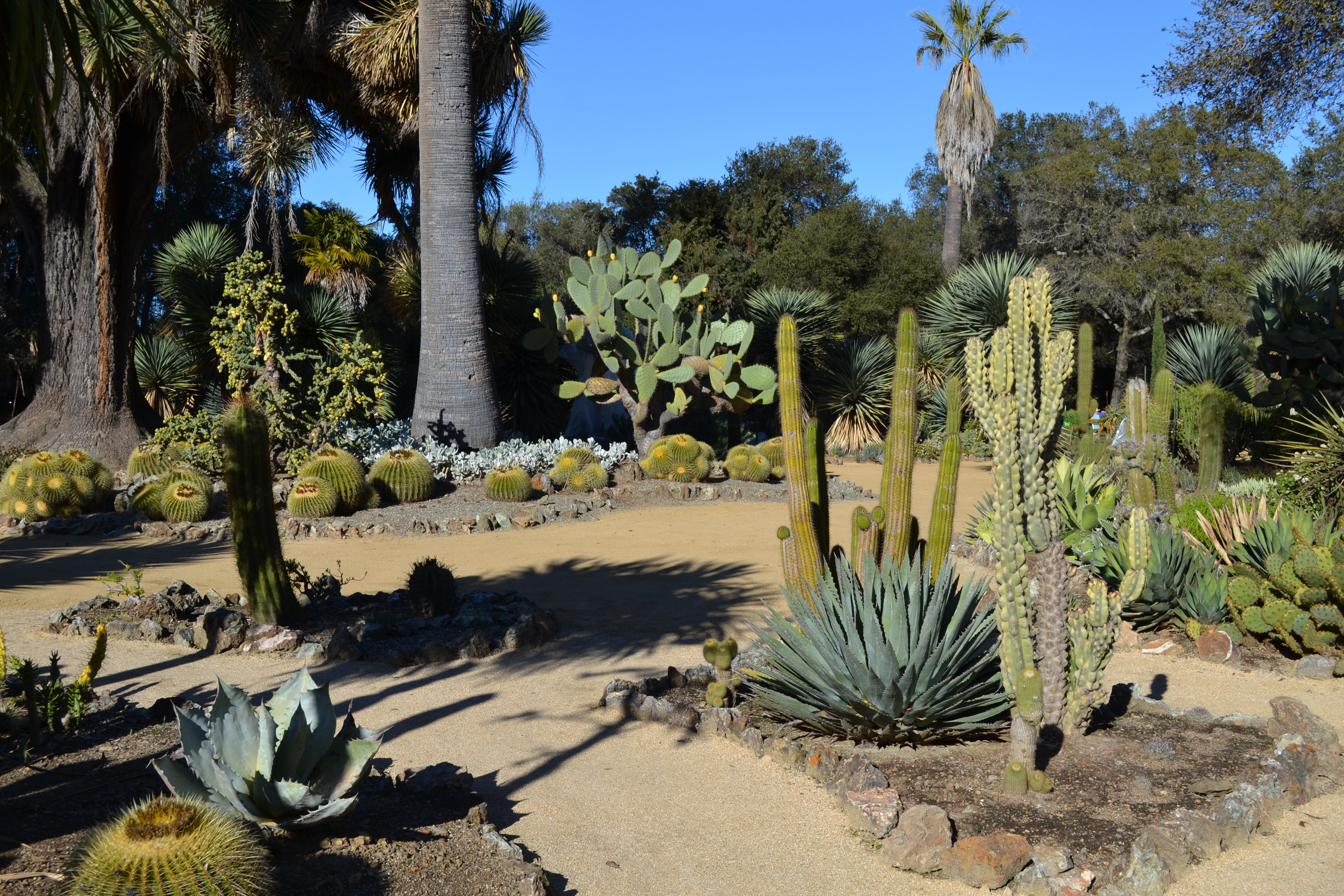
Yucca and some cactus

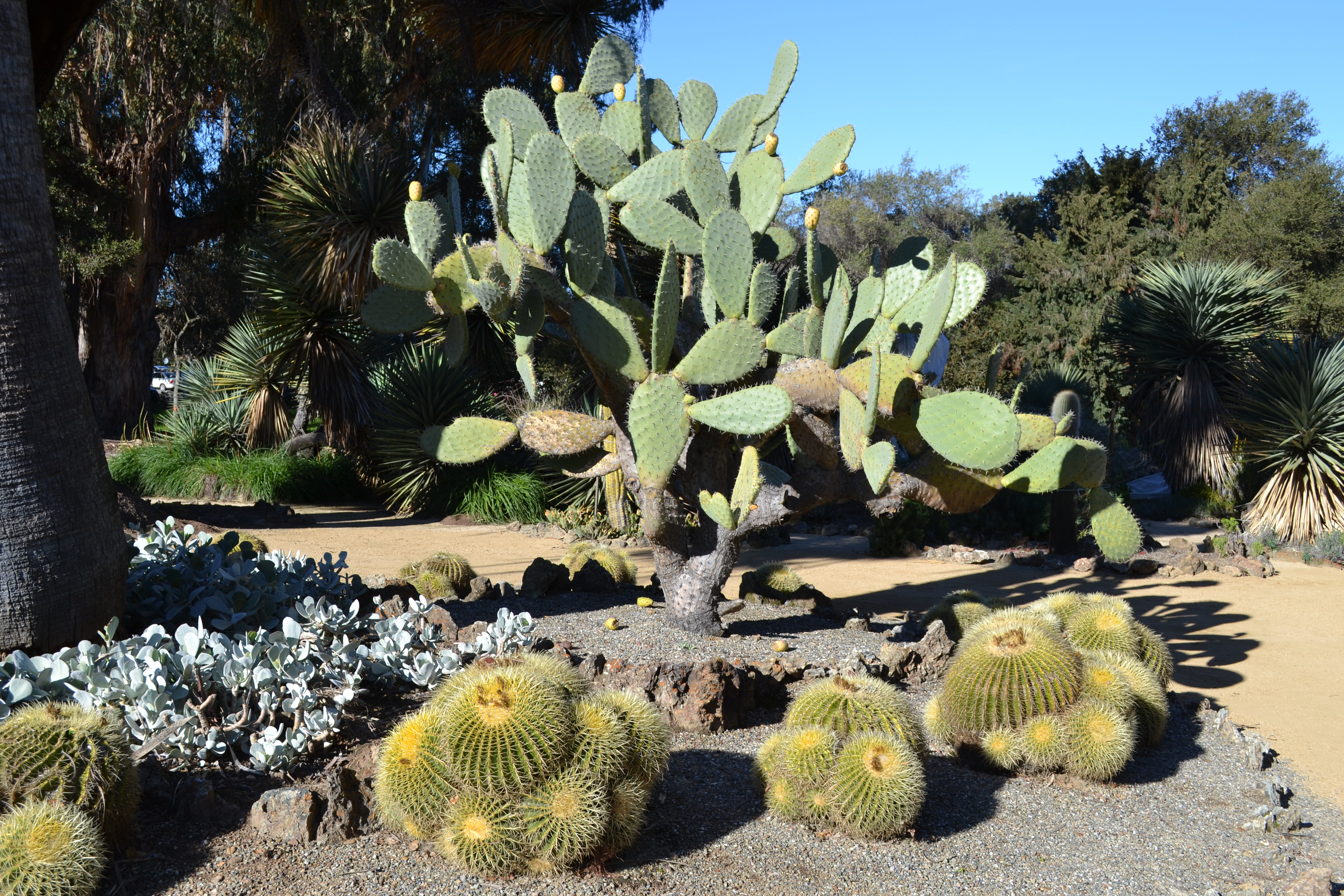
Golden barrel cactus plus other cactus

Plants known to be in the garden in 2016 include torch lily, century plant, golden barrel cactus, cholla cactus, Mojave yucca, Yucca filifera, Yucca schottii, Peruvian apple cactus, soap aloe, flat-flowered aloe, Boojum tree, aeonium, Ponytail palm and Italian cypress.

== See also ==
- The Arizona Garden at the Hotel Del Monte, another garden by Rudolph Ulrich in 1881-1882
- Stanford University Arboretum
- List of botanical gardens in the United States
