= Stanford University Arboretum =

Arboretum in Stanford, California

Coordinates: 37°26′16″N 122°10′00″W

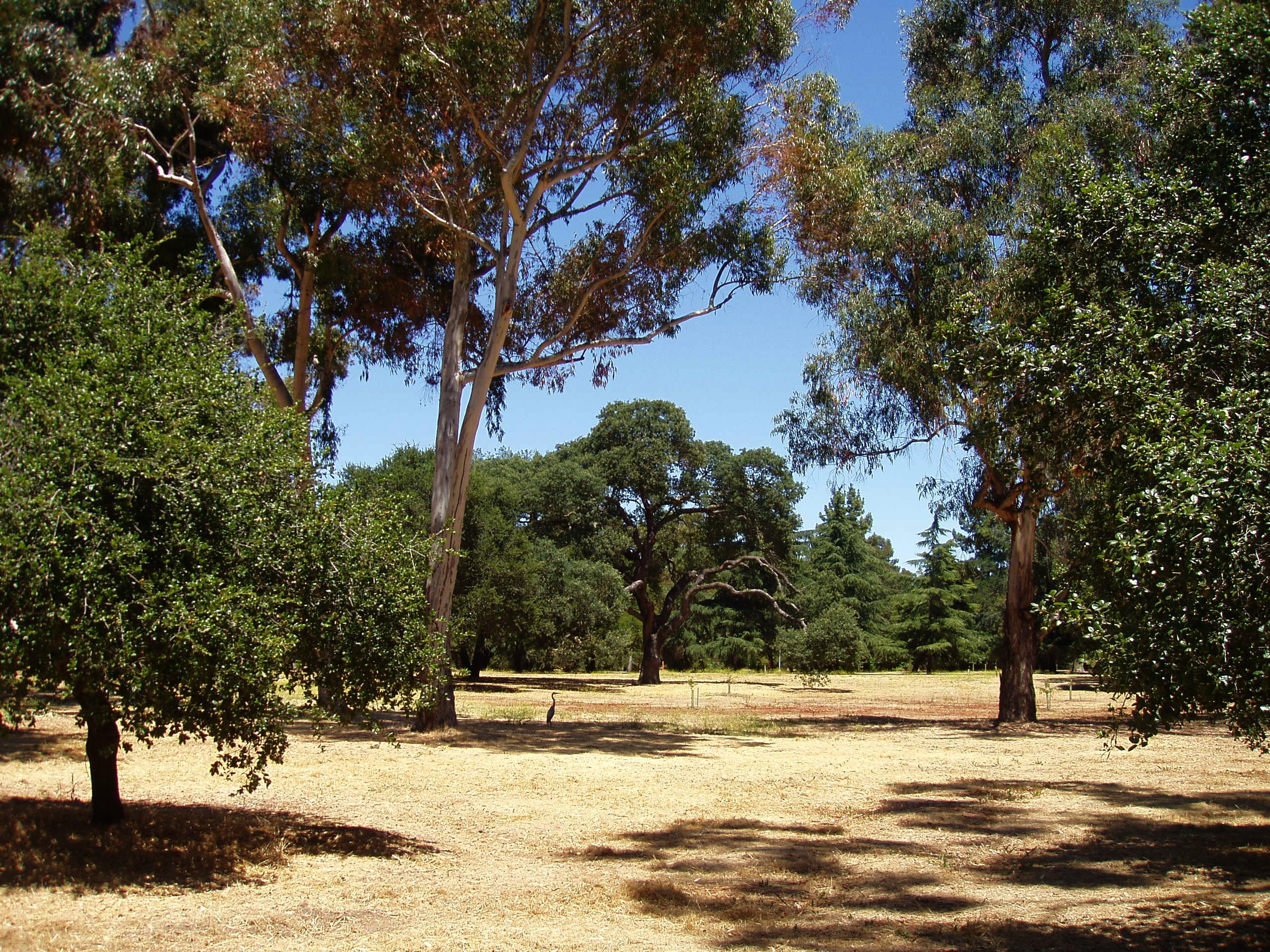
Stanford University Arboretum.

The Stanford University Arboretum is an arboretum located on the grounds of Stanford University in Stanford, California. It is open to the public daily without charge.

== Background ==
The arboretum began with the indigenous live oaks on Leland Stanford's estate, which later became the university campus, augmented by a variety of trees that he collected. In 1885 Stanford contracted with noted landscape designer Frederick Law Olmsted to plan the grounds. An 1888 memorandum by Olmsted, and signed by Stanford, states that the then-extant University Forest and the Arboretum were to be combined, and that "In this enlarged Arboretum it is desired that there shall be exhibited to advantage all the trees and wood plants of the world that may be expected to grow to mature natural forms under the climatic and other conditions of the locality." As Jane Stanford said in her 1903 address to the Stanford trustees:

No buildings of any kind whatever should ever be erected within the grounds of the original Arboretum. It should always be retained in its present condition as a Park for drives and walks so long as the University exists. This Park was a favorite project of my husband and carried into effect twenty-eight years ago. There are many miles of drive[s] within, or connected with shaded avenues, with this beautiful park. The choicest trees are there planted from all parts of the world, and as the years roll on and this most beautiful valley of Santa Clara becomes, as I have no doubt it will, the educational center of our State and thickly settled with beautiful homes, this park will be unique and of itself memorable and monumental. It should, accordingly, always be sacredly preserved from mutilation.

The University has had portions of the original Arboretum developed through long term leases to generate more income for the University. Developments include the Stanford Shopping Mall and professor housing.

=== No tree collection ===
However, these plans for a major tree collection within the arboretum grounds did not materialize. A report by the Olmsted Brothers (May 8, 1914) states: "The so-called 'Arboretum' extends on either side of the main approach from the County Road. At present the name Arboretum is a misnomer as the name implies that a great variety of trees in botanical order are to be found there. It consists, as a matter of fact, mostly of a thick plantation of blue gums and Monterey Cypress. “ Subsequently, the Department of Botany was given supervisory control of the arboretum in order to utilize it more fully for scientific purposes. The area has been largely neglected over the years, due to pushes to develop the area.

== Current status ==
At peak the arboretum contained over 350 species representing 150 genera and sixty families. The most common tree is the coast live oak, although valley, blue, and black oaks are also represented. During the twentieth century, the arboretum become a relatively unmaintained shady open space; it has been partially developed to generate income, such as being used as a parking lot during football games. In recent years there has been greater interest in further developments of the area. There has been a loss of diversity from the original tree and shrub plantings of the 1880s and 1890s, which is well documented for conifers. Now, the eucalyptus collection is all that is prominent; falling from its peak glory over the past quarter century, there has been a significant loss of Eucalypt species, from over 100 to 51 today. Some of the older tree specimens in the arboretum are an Atlas Cedar, California Washingtonia, California sycamore, Canary Island date palm, coast live oak, Deodar Cedar, Hampton oak, red mulberry, Santa Lucia Fir, Torrey Pine, and White Ash.

The Arizona Cactus Garden and Stanford Mausoleum are located within the arboretum.

== See also ==
- Arizona Cactus Garden
- List of botanical gardens in the United States
