= Carmel Highlands, California =

Unincorporated community in California, United States

- Unincorporated community
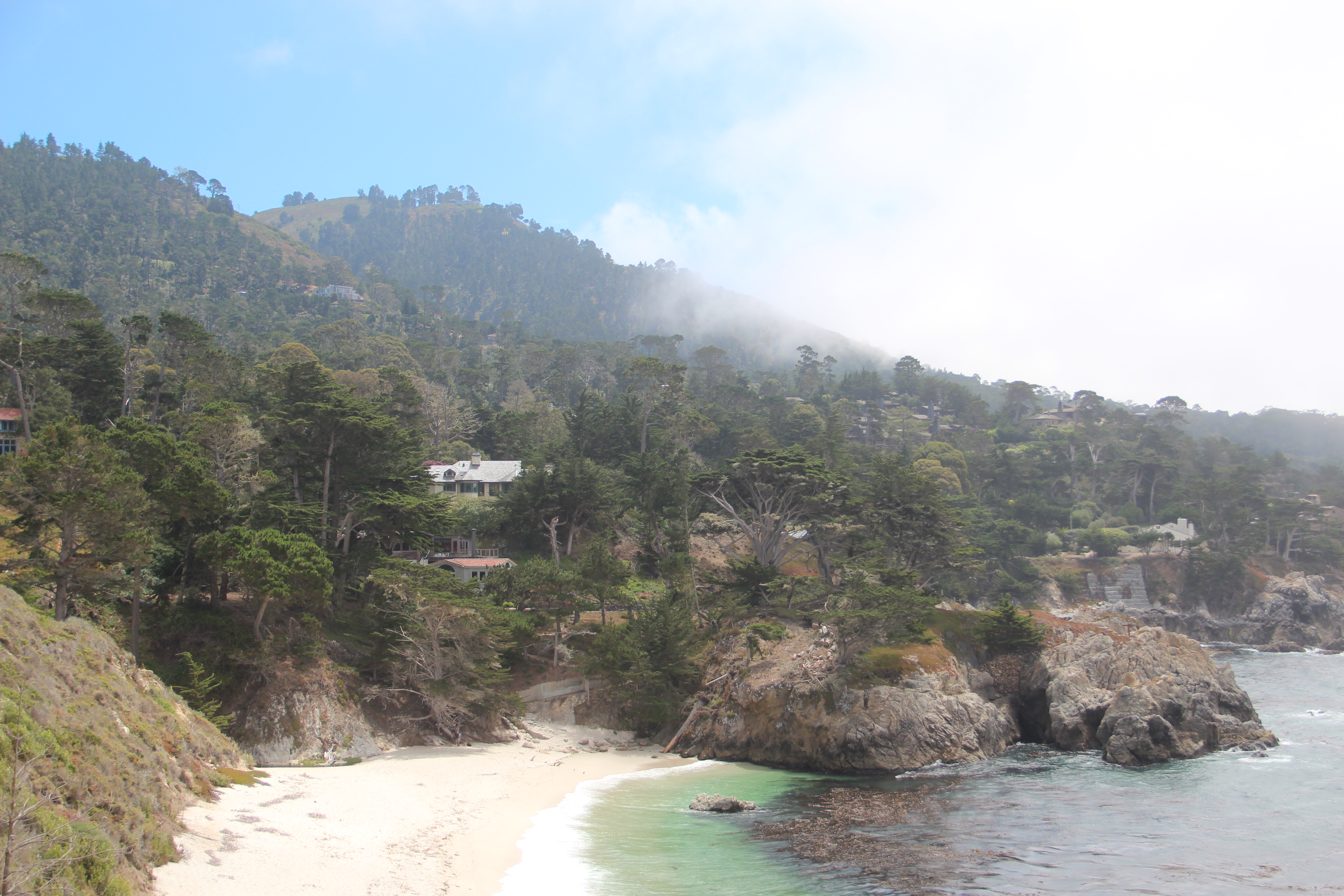
- Carmel Highlands viewed from the Point Lobos State Natural Reserve.

- Location in California Location in the United States
- Coordinates: 36°30′15″N 121°55′54″W
- Country: United States
- State: California
- County: Monterey County
- Established: 1916
- Elevation: 318 ft (97 m)
- Time zone: PST
  - Summer (DST): PDT
- ZIP code: 93923
- Area code: 831
- GNIS feature ID: 1759219

Carmel Highlands is an unincorporated community in Monterey County, California, United States. It is 3.5 miles (5.6 km) south of Carmel-by-the-Sea (better known as simply, "Carmel"), at an elevation of 318 feet (97 m). Carmel Highlands is just south of the Point Lobos State Reserve, and serves as the northern gateway of the Big Sur coastline along California State Route 1. Carmel Highlands was laid out in 1916 by developers Frank Hubbard Powers and James Franklin Devendorf and the Carmel Development Company.

== History ==
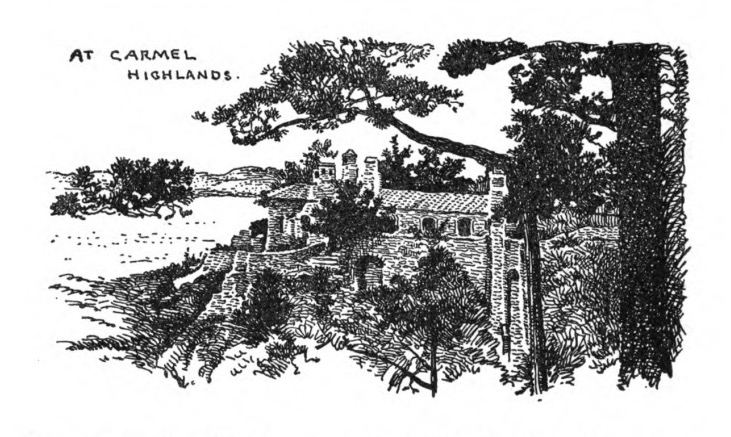
Illustration of Carmel Highlands by Jo Mora in 1926

In 1906, the Carmel Development Company purchased two miles (3 km) of land from the local ranchers south of Point Lobos, where it developed the Carmel Highlands. In 1915, Frank Devendorf developed the Carmel Highlands as a residential community of creative people dedicated to the arts. Devendorf and his foreman, Frank DeAmaral developed the area with the Highlands Inn as a resort hotel at the center of the development. He planted pine trees and laid out the roads and building sites. His friend, marine artist William Frederic Ritschel, helped him plan sight lines for the hotel that had views north along the coast. The building of the Big Sur Coast Highway in the 1930s opened the area and allowed tourists to discover the area. Point Lobos, which borders the Highlands on the north, became a State Park in 1933.

The Carmel Highlands was important in the development of the regional art colony during the first half of the 20th century. Here many painters and sculptors found inspiration in the rugged scenery and established studio-homes, including: Ferdinand Burgdorff, Alice Comins, Theodore Criley, Arthur Hill Gilbert, Ralph Helm Johonnot, Ada Howe Kent, George J. Koch, Louise F. MacDougal, John O'Shea, Thomas S. Parkhurst, Ira Mallory Remsen, William Frederic Ritschel, Nora Havel Ritschel.

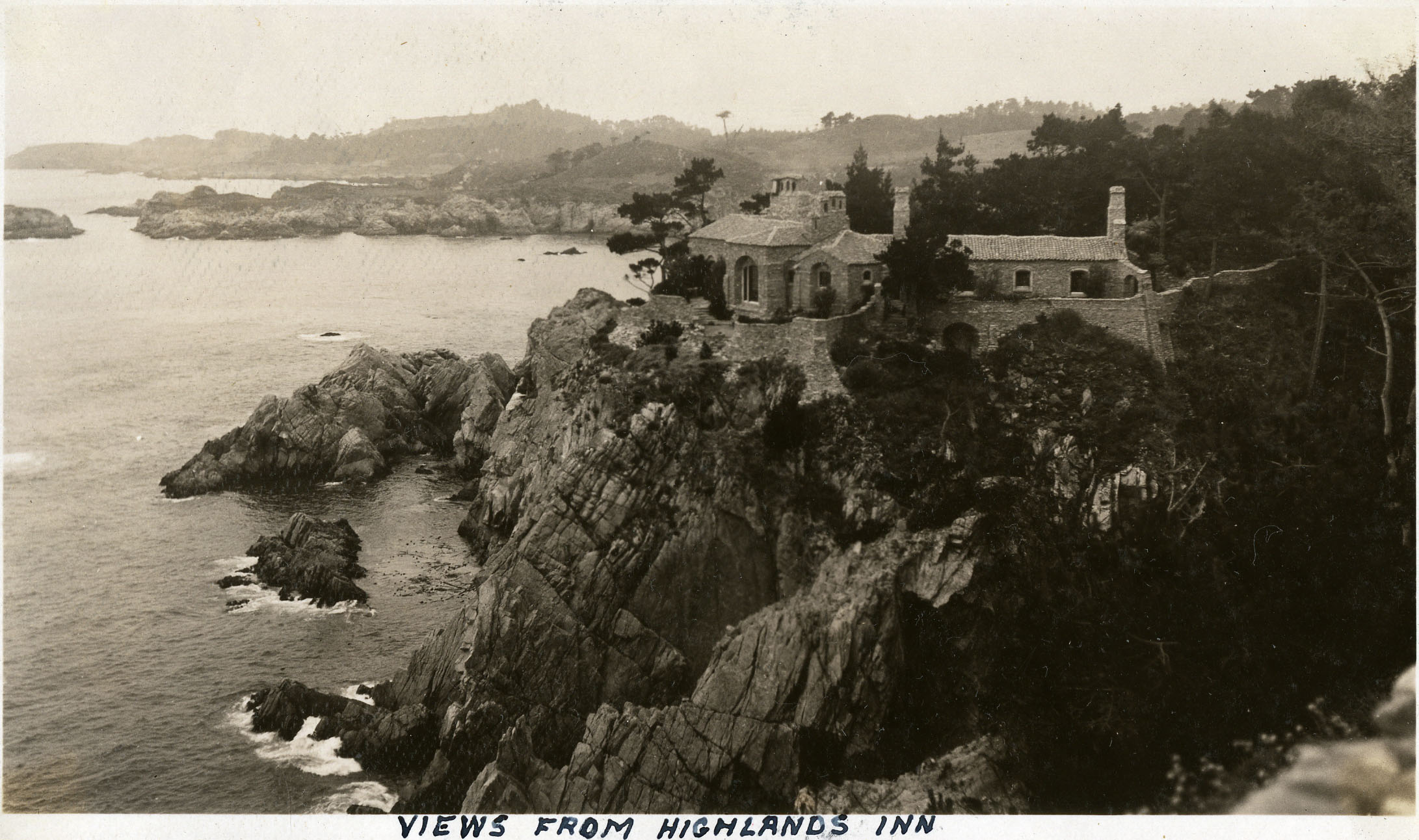
Seaward, the Carmel Highlands home of D. L. James

In 1918, writer Daniel Lewis James's father, D. L. James Sr., (1880–1944), purchased property in Carmel Highlands and hired the firm Greene and Greene to build a stone house on a bluff overlooking the water. Greene supervised the construction of the granite house that took five years to complete. The house was later called "Seaward" and was a summer retreat for the family for 20 years. In 2022 actor Brad Pitt purchased Seaward for $40M.

The Farrar House, also known as the Far-A-Way or Copper Spine, located in Carmel Highlands, was designed by architect Mark Mills in collaboration with Philip and Betty Farrar. Mills, who apprenticed under Frank Lloyd Wright at Taliesin West from 1944 to 1948, created a distinctive design that caught the attention of the architectural world. The Far-A-Way house was featured in the September 2009 issue of Architectural Digest, as a true work of art.

Ansel Adams, and Edward Weston, whose studio home, Wildcat Hill, is preserved and occupied by his grandson, Kim Weston. The local Carmel literati frequently socialized in the Highlands, including Lincoln Steffens, Ella Winter, Robinson Jeffers, and Sinclair Lewis.

Many celebrities have homes and vacation homes in this area. The ZIP Code is 93923, and the community is inside area code 831.

== Government ==
At the county level, Carmel Highlands is represented on the Monterey County Board of Supervisors by Supervisor Mary Adams. In the California State Legislature, Carmel Highlands is in the 17th senatorial district, represented by Democrat John Laird, and in the 29th Assembly district, represented by Democrat Robert Rivas.

In the United States House of Representatives, Carmel Highlands is in California's 19th congressional district, represented by Democrat Jimmy Panetta.

== Notable people ==
- Brad Pitt, American actor
- John Denver, American singer-songwriter and resident from 1996, died in a plane crash in Monterey Bay near Pacific Grove on October 12, 1997.
- Joan Fontaine, Academy Award winning actress

== See also ==
- List of places in California
- Soberanes Fire, 2016
