= Jack Shea =

Jack Shea may refer to:

- Jack Shea (speed skater) (1910–2002), American speed skater
- Jack Shea (footballer) (1927–1983), Australian rules footballer
- Jack Shea (director) (1928–2013), American film and television director

== See also ==
- Jack O'Shea (born 1947), Irish Gaelic footballer
- John Shea (disambiguation)
