= Seán O'Shea (disambiguation) =

Seán O'Shea or Seán Ó Sé may refer to

- Seán O'Shea (born 1998), Kerry Gaelic footballer active since 2018
- Seán Ó Sé (1936–2026), Irish traditional and folk singer
- Seán O'Shea (born 1942/3), Kerry Gaelic footballer, unused substitute in the 1970 All-Ireland Senior Football Championship final
- Jack O'Shea (born 1957), Kerry Gaelic footballer active 1976–1992
- John O'Shea (disambiguation)
