= William Frederic Ritschel =

Impressionist artist (1864–1949)

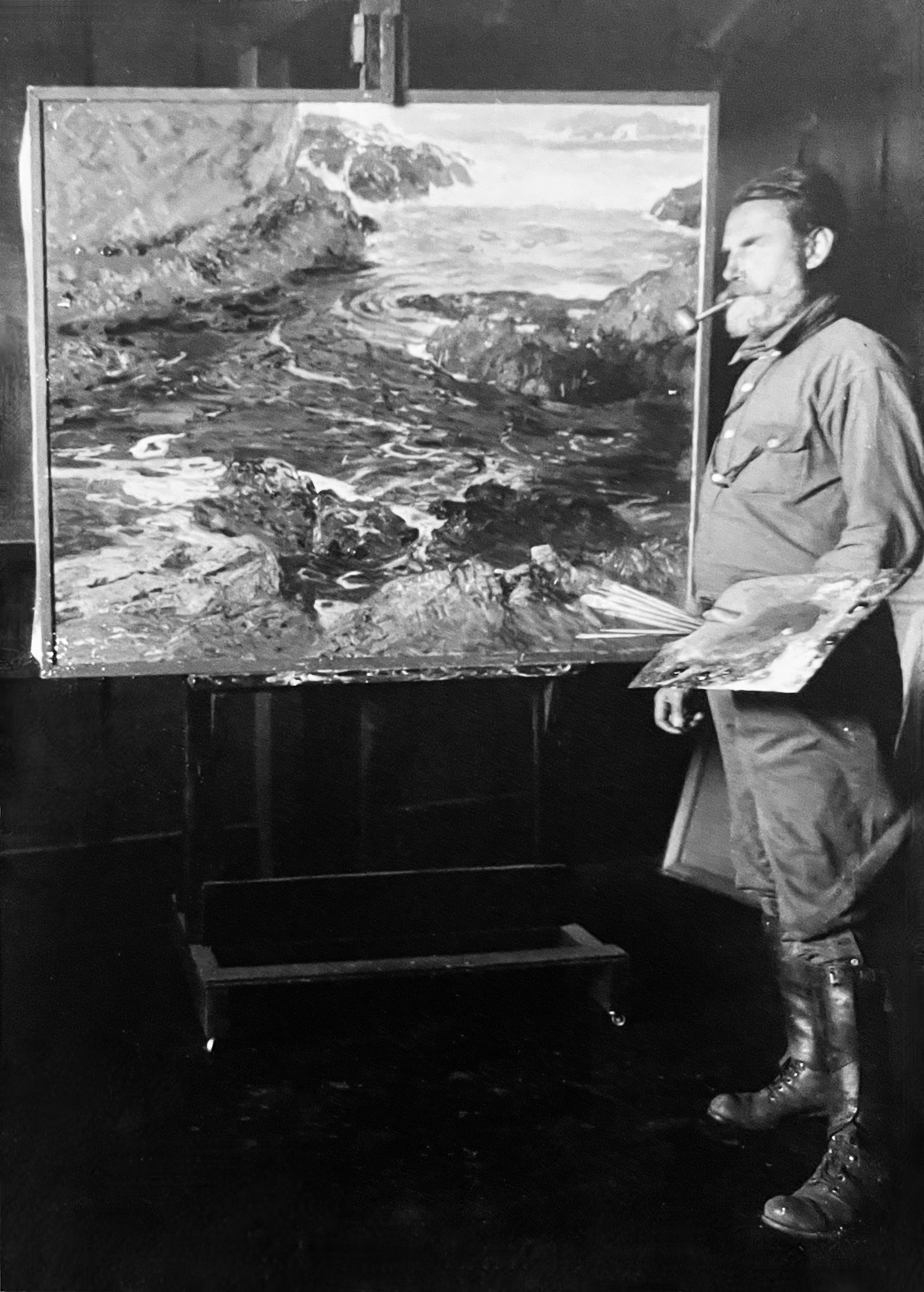
- Ritschel in his studio at Carmel Highlands, ca. 1925
- Born: July 11, 1864; Nurenberg, Kingdom of Bavaria
- Died: March 11, 1949 (aged 84); Carmel Highlands, California
- Style: impressionist painter
- Spouses: Bella "Zora" Hollingsworth (1900); Nora Havel (1930)

William Frederic Ritschel, also known as Wilhelm Frederick Ritschel (July 11, 1864 – March 11, 1949), was a California impressionist painter who was born in Nurenberg, Kingdom of Bavaria.

== Germany and New York ==
After completing his education at a regional Gymnasium and Industrial School, Wilhelm left an apprenticeship as a lithographer and served from 1883 to 1887 in the Imperial German Navy, where he began to paint and decorate large seashells, one of which was presented to England's future King Edward VII. As the nephew of Ernest Ritschel, a German sculptor and founder of the Dresden Art School, he studied at the Academy of Fine Arts, Munich, under Karl Raupp (1837–1918), and Wilhelm von Kaulbach (1805–1874) between 1888 and 1894 and became a member of the Kunstverein München. His seascapes and studies of horses were exhibited throughout Germany and in Paris. Responding to an invitation from his physician-cousin, he sailed in November 1895 to New York City. According to the U.S. Census in June 1900, he was a widower, artist, and resident of Suffolk County, New York.

In 1900, Ritschel married Bella "Zora" Hollingsworth, a Texas-born widow who was ten years younger, and moved to Manhattan. On June 16, 1904, he became a naturalized citizen and visited Europe in the succeeding years, including Norway, France, and the Netherlands. Until the early 1930s, New York remained an important venue for the exhibition and sale of his paintings. One of his earliest shows was in 1901 at the Currier Art Gallery; that same year he was elected member of the Salmagundi Club, where he exhibited for almost 40 years. He was awarded the Club's Honorable Mention in 1912 and the Isidor Medal in 1923. He was a frequent contributor to the National Academy of Design where he was elected an Associate (A.N.A.) in 1910 and a National Academician (N.A.) in 1914 and where he received the Carnegie Prize (1912–13), two Honorable Mentions (1921 and 1926), and on an unprecedented three occasions the Ranger Fund Prize (1920s).

== Career in California ==
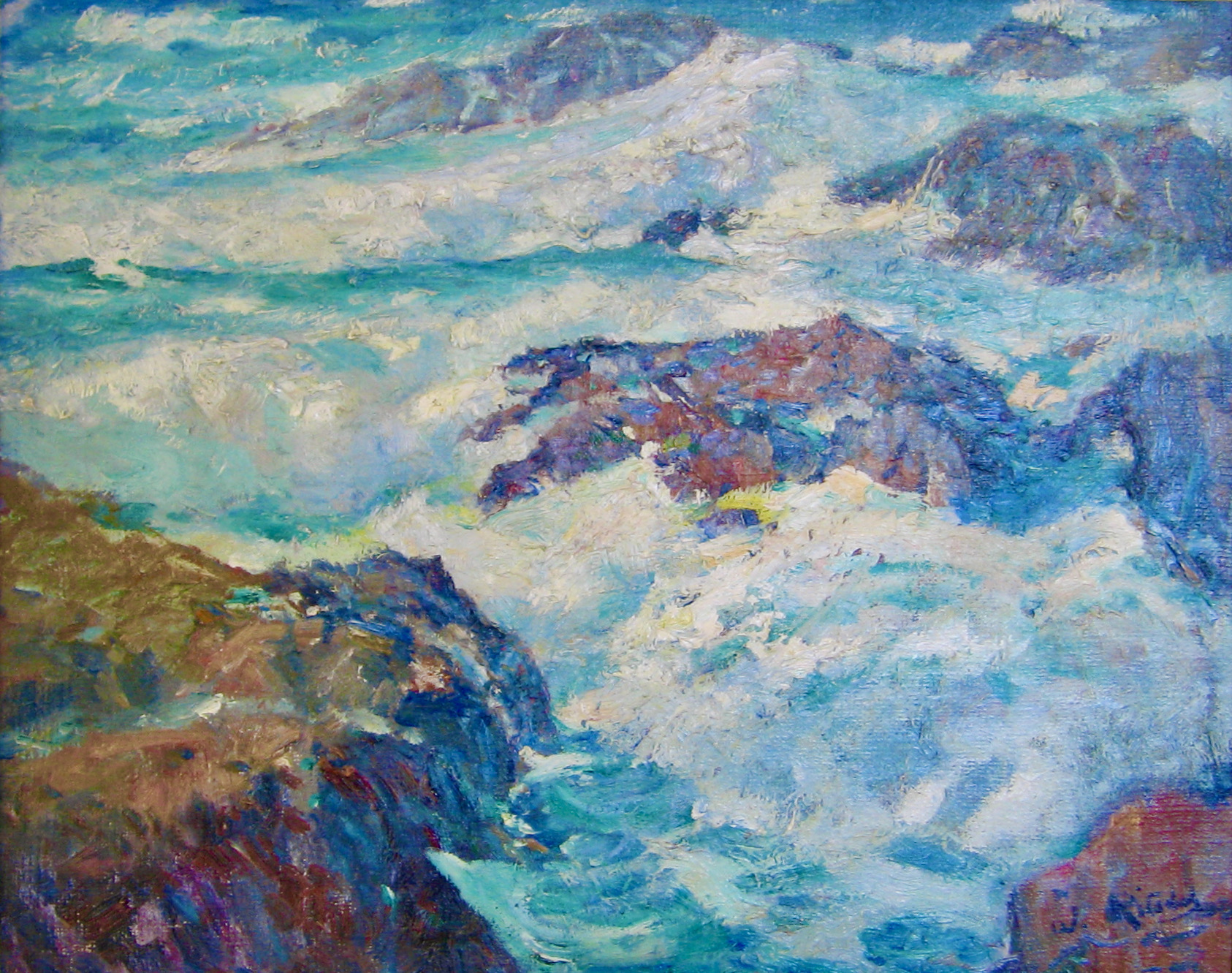
William F. Ritschel (1864-1949), Carmel-by-the-Sea, circa 1930, oil on canvas.

The Sea 1 (Dolphins), oil on canvas painting by William Frederic Ritschel, c. 1928, Honolulu Museum of Art

He spent his first summer near Carmel-by-the-Sea, California, in 1911. Six years later he purchased a "seasonal cottage" and rented a studio from Elizabeth T Bigelow in the nearby Carmel Highlands. In 1919 began construction on his famous stone castle or "eagle's nest" in the Highlands. The U.S. Census in January 1920 still recorded his official residence as Manhattan. According to his artist-friend Jennie V. Cannon, he occupied the castle as his permanent home in the spring of 1921. He exhibited at the Carmel Arts and Crafts Club between 1913 and 1924 and continued as a frequent exhibiting member for more than two decades at the Carmel Art Association, where he received numerous awards and served as president and on the board of directors. In 1914, he met on several occasions with William Merritt Chase, who was teaching a summer class in Carmel. Two years later he volunteered to design and paint sets for the local Forest Theater.

His seascapes of the California coast and his scenes from his trips to the South Seas (1922 and 1924–25) were immensely popular in commercial galleries throughout the United States and frequently sold for record prices. He married his third wife, the sculptor Nora Havel, in 1930.

== Partial list of exhibitions ==
Outside of Carmel some of the venues where he exhibited and often received awards include the: Pratt Institute (New York); Folsom Galleries (New York City); New York Water Color Club; Macbeth Galleries (New York City); Ainslie Galleries (New York City); Carnegie Institute in Pittsburgh (Honorable Mention in 1912); Annuals of the Pennsylvania Academy of Fine Arts; Milch Galleries (New York City); Panama–Pacific International Exposition (Gold Medal 1915); Boston Art Club; Art Club of Philadelphia (Gold Medal in 1918 and 1924); Art Institute of Chicago (Harris Prize 1920s); Royal Academy of Art (London); Paris Salon (Honorable Mention in 1928); Annual of American Art in Springville (Purchase Prize in 1930), Cannell & Chaffin Galleries (Los Angeles); Stendahl Galleries (Los Angeles); Biltmore Salon (Los Angeles); Kanst Galleries (Los Angeles); Los Angeles Museum of Art in Exposition Park; California Water Color Society; Statewide Annual of the Santa Cruz Art League (First Prize 1930 and 1937; Honorable Mention in 1941); Hotel Del Monte Art Gallery (Monterey); California State Fair (First Prize 1917, 1926, 1936 and 1941; Second Prize 1927 and 1940); San Francisco Art Association; Gump Gallery (San Francisco); Bohemian Club (San Francisco); Palace of the Legion of Honor (San Francisco); Courvoisier Gallery (San Francisco); Stanford University Art Gallery (Palo Alto), and especially the Oakland Art Gallery, where he received eleven major awards.

== Public collections ==
Among the public collections holding works by William Frederic Ritschel are the: Arizona State University Art Museum (Tempe, Arizona), Art Institute of Chicago, Crocker Art Museum (Sacramento, California), Davenport Museum of Art (Davenport, Iowa), Fisher Gallery (University of Southern California, Los Angeles), Honolulu Museum of Art, Irvine Museum (Irvine, California), Monterey Museum of Art (Monterey, California), Museum of Art at Brigham Young University (Provo, Utah), Newark Museum (Newark, New Jersey), Oakland Museum of California (Oakland, California), Pennsylvania Academy of the Fine Arts (Philadelphia), Smithsonian American Art Museum (Washington, D. C.), Springville Museum of Art (Springville, Utah), and University of Arizona Museum of Art (Tucson, Arizona).

== Death ==
Ritschel died on March 11, 1949, in his Carmel Highlands, California, studio-home.

== Bibliography ==
- Edwards, Robert W., Jennie V. Cannon: The Untold History of the Carmel and Berkeley Art Colonies, Vol. 1, Oakland, Calif.: East Bay Heritage Project, 2012, ISBN 9781467545679.
- Gerdts, William H., Art Across America: Two Centuries of Regional Painting, 1710-1920, New York, Abbeville Press, 1990.
- Oakland Art Gallery, Paintings by William Ritschel; Paintings & Sculpture by George Alois Laisner, Oakland, Calif.: Oakland Art Gallery, 1947.
- Papanikolas, Theresa and DeSoto Brown, Art Deco Hawai'i, Honolulu, Honolulu Museum of Art, 2014, ISBN 978-0-937426-89-0, p. 100
