= Devendorf =

Devendorf is a surname. Notable people with the surname include:

- Bryan Devendorf, American drummer
- Eric Devendorf (born 1987), American basketball player
- Scott Devendorf, American musician, brother of Bryan
- James Franklin Devendorf, pioneer real estate developer and philanthropist
