= Stanford Mausoleum =

Burial place in Palo Alto, California

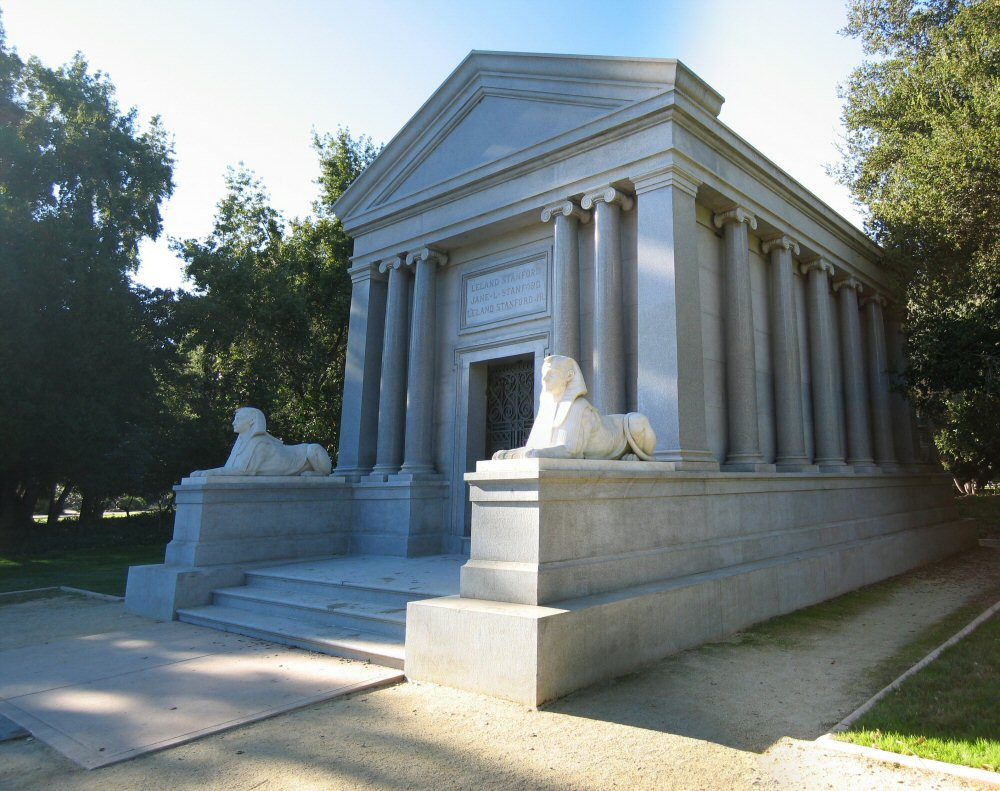
- Stanford Mausoleum
- Interactive map of Stanford Mausoleum
- Location: Palo Alto, California, Us
- Coordinates: 37.43651°N 122.16989°W
- Type: Mausoleum

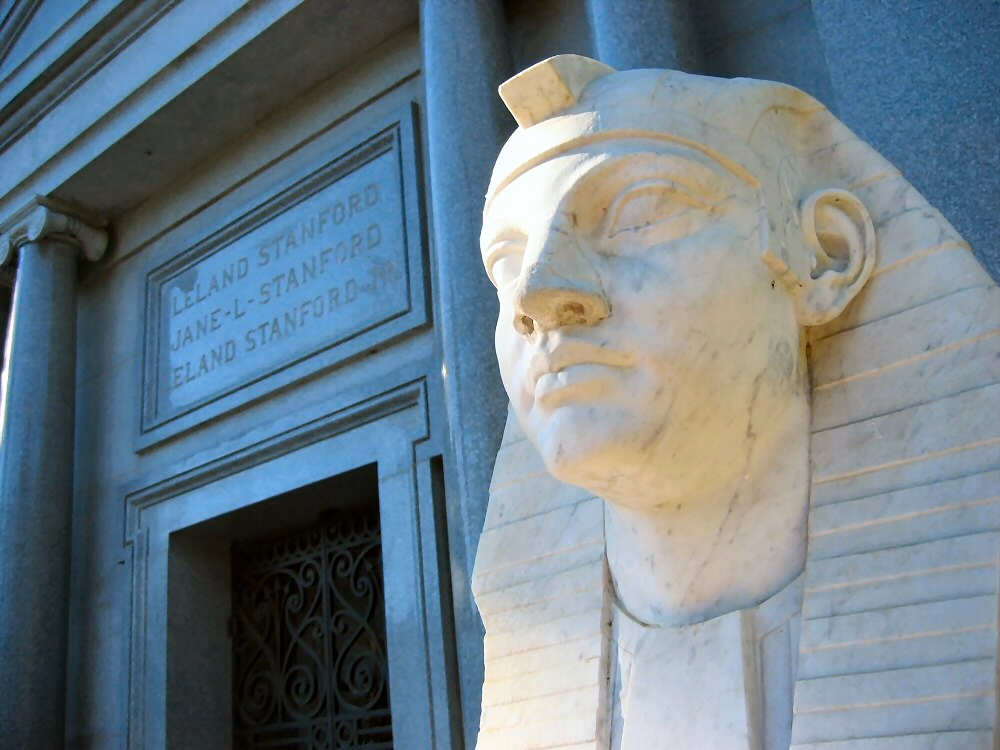
Sphinx in front of the Mausoleum

The Stanford Mausoleum, located in the Northwest of the Stanford University campus in the Stanford University Arboretum, holds the remains of the university's namesake Leland Stanford, Jr. and his parents Leland and Jane Stanford.

Once per year, the mausoleum is opened to the public and a wreath laid (usually in October during the reunion weekend) as part of the annual Founders' Day activities.

== History ==
The original intent of the Stanfords was to build a family mansion. They had only gotten as far as planting a cactus garden (still present) before the death of their only son. They changed their plans to building a university in his name instead. Nearby is a memorial (the Angel of Grief) to Jane Stanford's brother, Henry Clay Lathrop. This memorial is a 1908 copy of a 1901 copy of an 1894 statue by the prominent American sculptor William Wetmore Story.

The Mausoleum was completed in 1889 at a cost exceeding $100,000 (approximately $3 million in 2026 Dollars). Its architect was unrecorded and it may have been a "catalogue design" provided by a monument company. The granite was quarried and dressed in Barre, Vermont, and the components were shipped by rail to Stanford where they were assembled. The Mausoleum also incorporates white marble from Carrara, Italy.

== Appearance ==
The mausoleum has sphinxes on both the front and the back. The back ones are Greek and female with naked breasts. They were originally on the front but the Stanfords disapproved of them and replaced them with Egyptian style male sphinxes and moved the female sphinxes to the back.

== Halloween Mausoleum Party ==
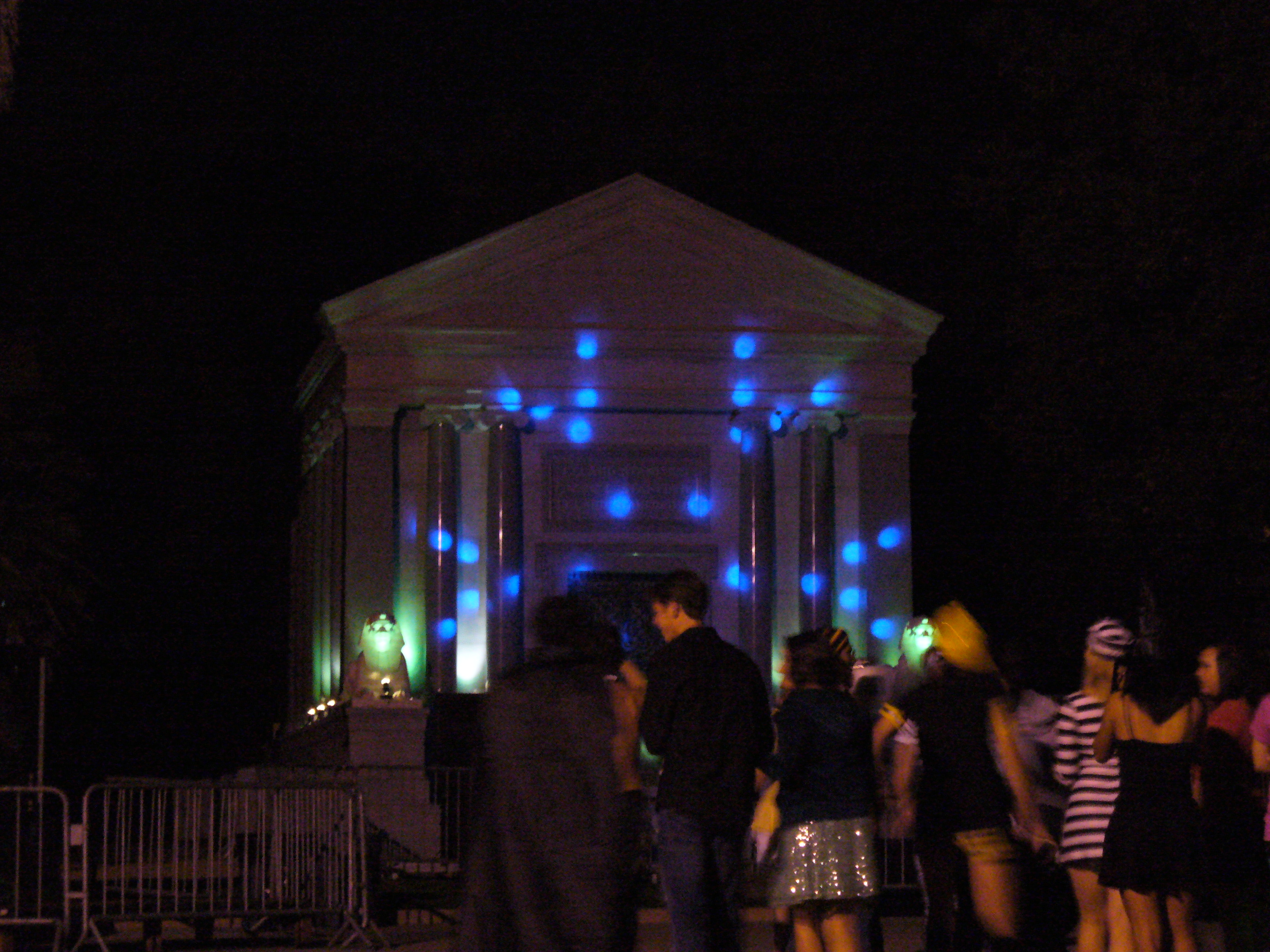
Halloween Party at the Mausoleum

Stanford Mausoleum is also the site of the traditional Mausoleum Party, informally referred to as Maus, a student Halloween party held each year at 10:00pm on the last Friday or Saturday of October. After being temporarily cancelled from 2002 to 2005, this tradition was revived in 2006. It is sponsored and planned annually by the Stanford Sophomore Class.
