= Leland Stanford Jr. =

Namesake of Stanford University

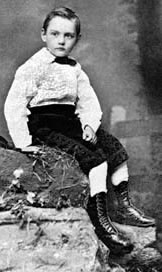
- Leland Stanford in 1872
- Born: Leland DeWitt Stanford; May 14, 1868; Sacramento, California, U.S.
- Died: March 13, 1884 (aged 15); Florence, Italy
- Known for: Namesake of Stanford University
- Parents: Leland Stanford (father); Jane Stanford (mother)

Leland Stanford Jr. (born Leland DeWitt Stanford; May 14, 1868 – March 13, 1884) was the only child of American industrialist and politician Leland Stanford and his wife, Jane. Following his death from typhoid at age 15, Stanford became the namesake of Stanford University, which is officially called Leland Stanford Junior University.

== Early life ==
Stanford was the only child of California Governor Leland Stanford and his wife, Jane Stanford (née Lathrop). His mother was 39 and his father was 44. They had a nearly 18-year childless marriage until Stanford was born.

== Illness and death ==
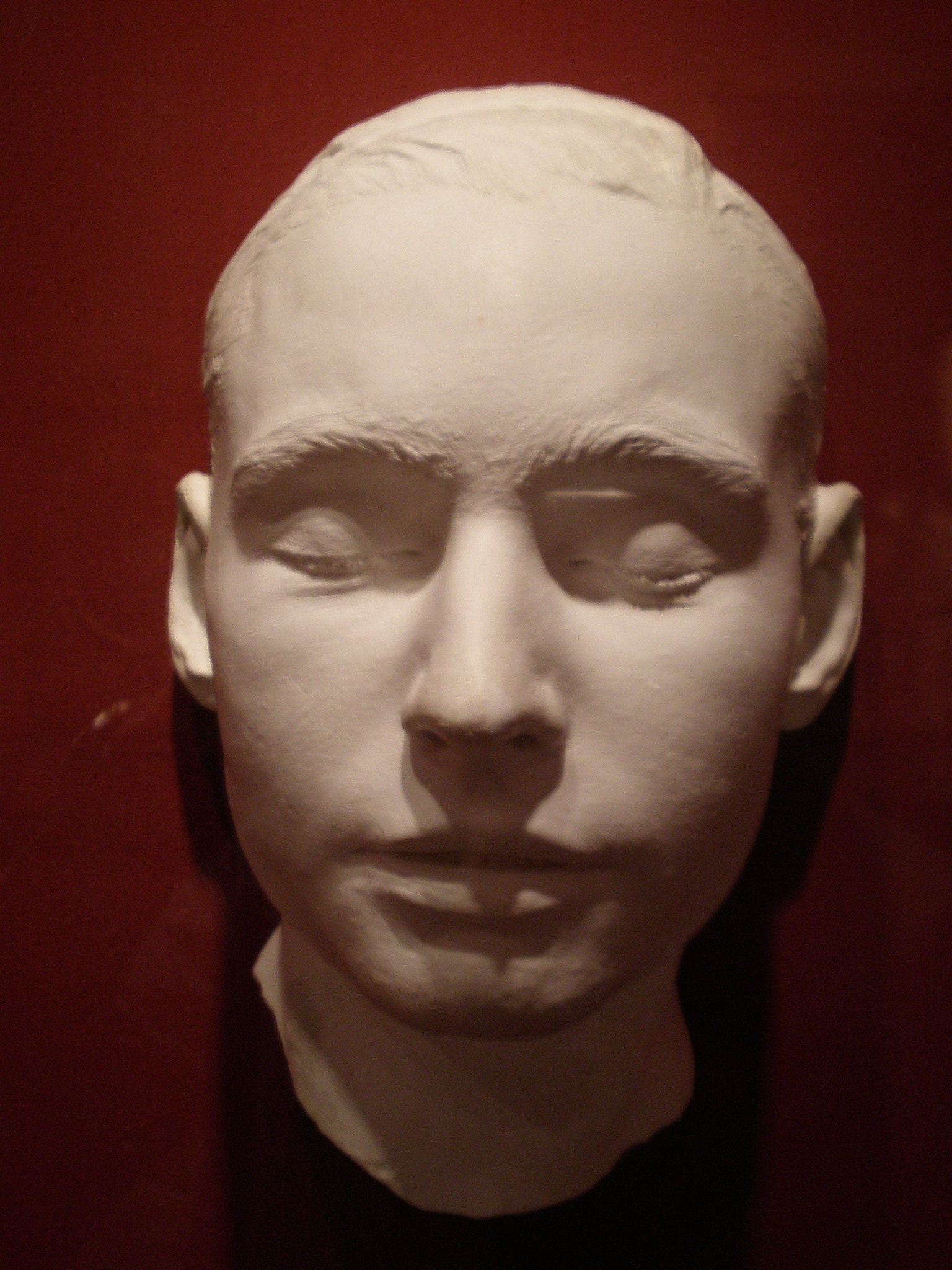
Stanford's death mask on display at the Iris & B. Gerald Cantor Center for Visual Arts

Stanford caught typhoid two months before his 16th birthday on a Grand Tour of Europe with his parents. Stanford originally fell ill in Athens, and his parents rushed him to Italy for medical treatment, first to Naples, then to Rome, and eventually to Florence, where Stanford died after weeks of a condition that alternately improved and worsened.

== Legacy ==
Leland Stanford Sr. told his wife that "the children of California shall be our children." To honor their son, once they returned to the United States, the Stanfords devoted their fortune to a memorial in his name, Leland Stanford Junior University, which opened its doors in 1891.

Leland Stanford Jr. is interred beside his parents at the Stanford family mausoleum on the Stanford campus. After the death of his father on June 21, 1893, his mother guided the development of the university until her death on February 28, 1905.

=== Nomenclature ===
Although the university is generally referred to as "Stanford University" or "Stanford," its official name is still "Leland Stanford Junior University," as it can be seen on the university seal.
