= Highlands Inn, Carmel Highlands =

Historic hotel in California, U.S.

Highlands Inn
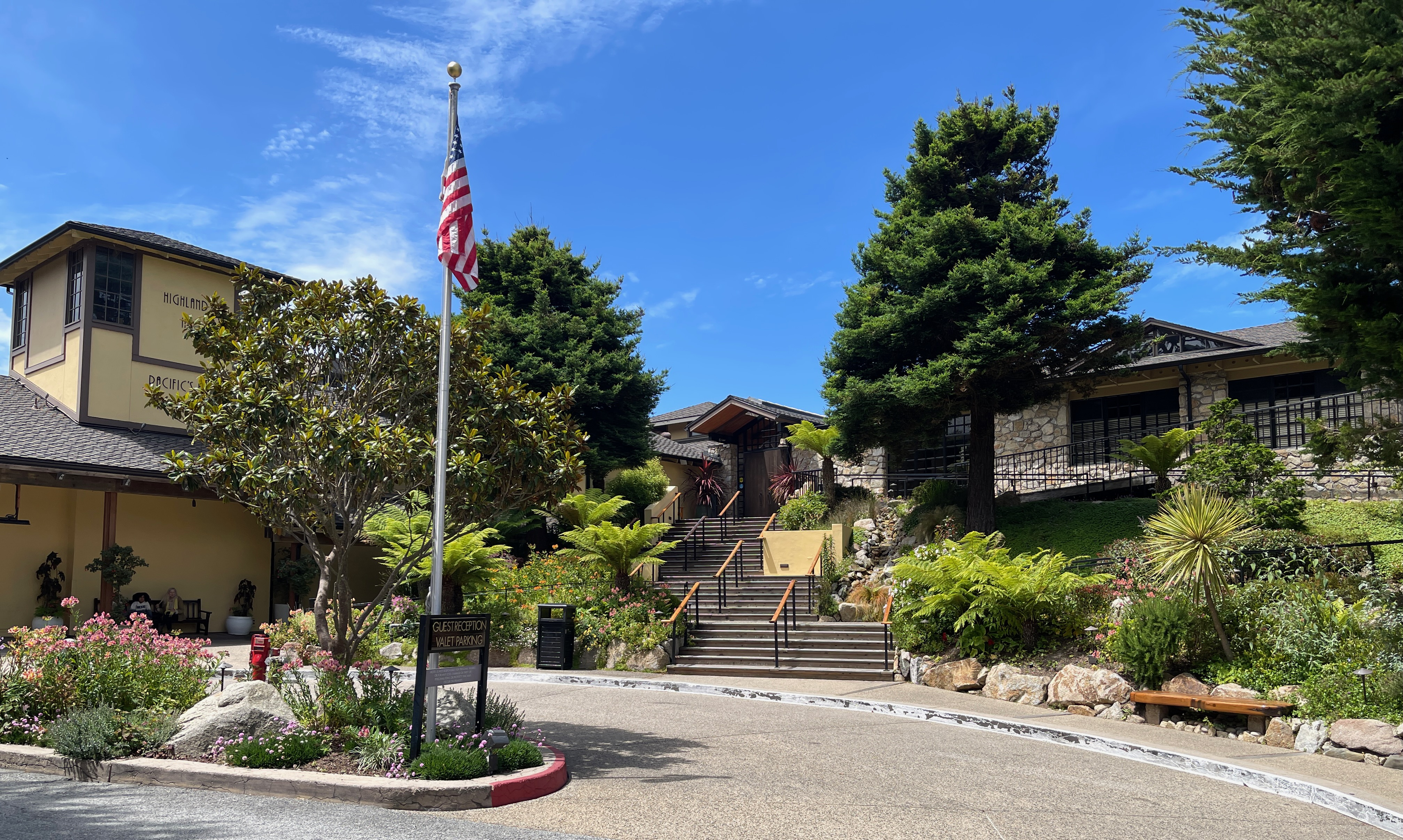
- Highlands Inn entrance
- Interactive map of the Highlands Inn area

General information
- Architectural style: Arts and Crafts
- Location: Carmel Highlands, California, U.S., 120 Highlands Drive
- Coordinates: 36°30′6″N 121°56′14″W
- Construction started: 1915
- Construction stopped: 1917
- Opening: July 28, 1917
- Operator: Hyatt

Technical details
- Floor count: 2

Design and construction
- Architect: Will Shaw (1981–1982)
- Main contractor: Robert Gillett
- Awards: Top Honor Award from American Institute of Architects

Other information
- Number of rooms: 48
- Number of restaurants: 1
- Number of bars: 1

The Highlands Inn is a historic resort hotel located in Carmel Highlands, California, established in 1917. A portion still operates as a hotel, the Hyatt Carmel Highlands, while the rest of the property is a timeshare marketed as Hyatt Vacation Club at Highlands Inn.

== History ==
Its overall architectural style is from the turn-of-the century Arts and Crafts movement.

The Highlands Inn was completed in 1917, with an official opening taking place on July 28, 1917.

In 1922, Devendorf sold the Highlands Inn to Edward H. Tickle, later California State senator for Monterey. In 1925, the articles of incorporation of the Highlands Inn Co., were filed in the County Clerk office.

The Highlands Inn was sold in 1981, to a group of investors. In 1984, the Highlands Inn won first place in the historical renovation category of the Project Design Award presented by the American Society of Interior Designers. The renovation of the Highlands Inn was completed in May 1985. Will Shaw won a Top Honor Award from the American Institute of Architecture for the design.

Hyatt assumed operation of the resort on May 18, 1999, renaming it Highlands Inn - A Park Hyatt Hotel. A portion of the resort still operates as a hotel, today known as the Hyatt Carmel Highlands, while the rest of the property is a timeshare marketed as Hyatt Vacation Club at Highlands Inn.

== Gallery ==
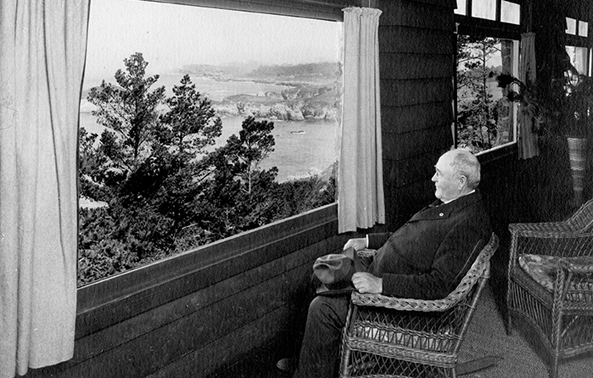
Inside the Highlands Inn in the 1920s.

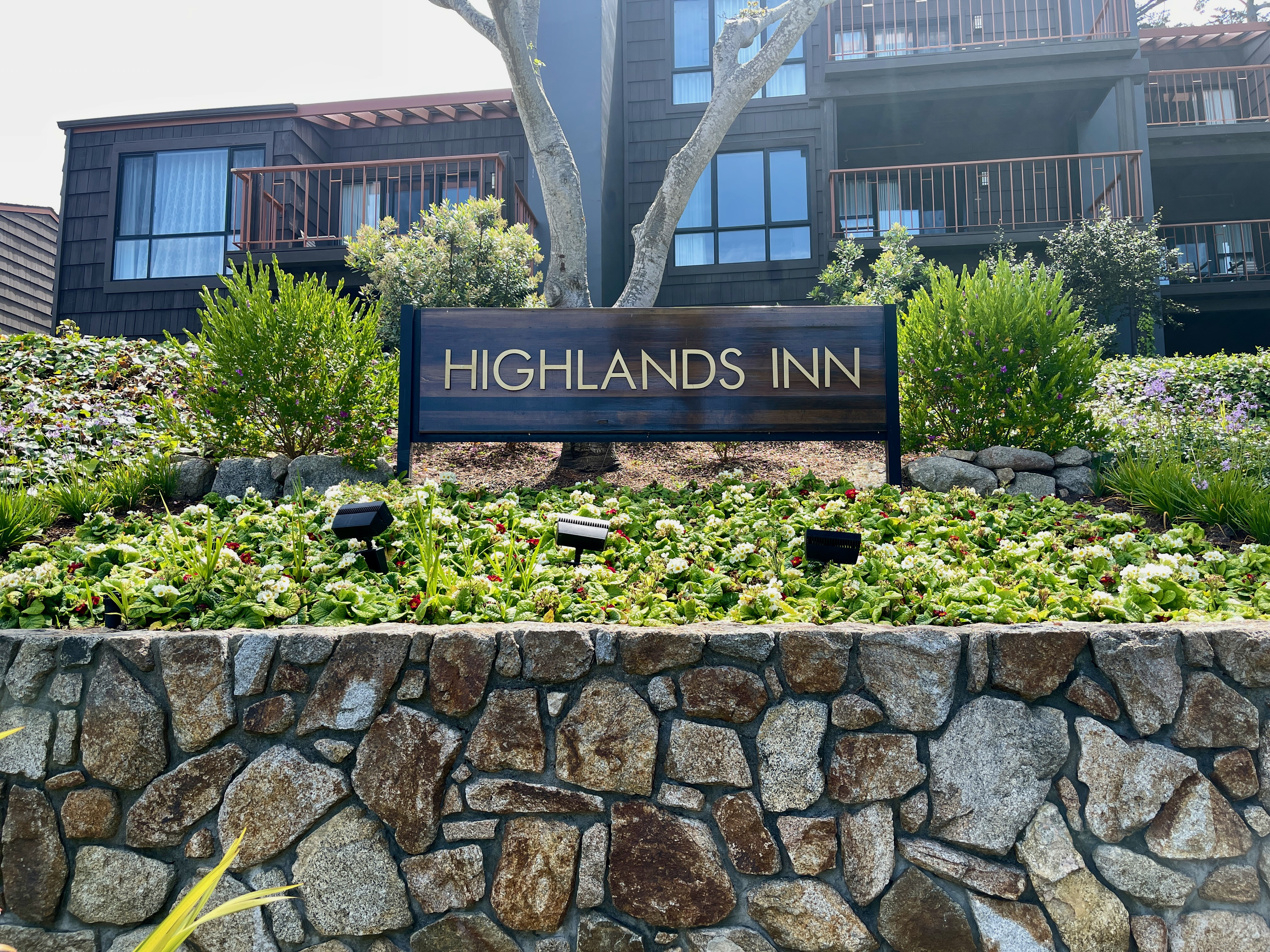
The Highlands Inn sign.

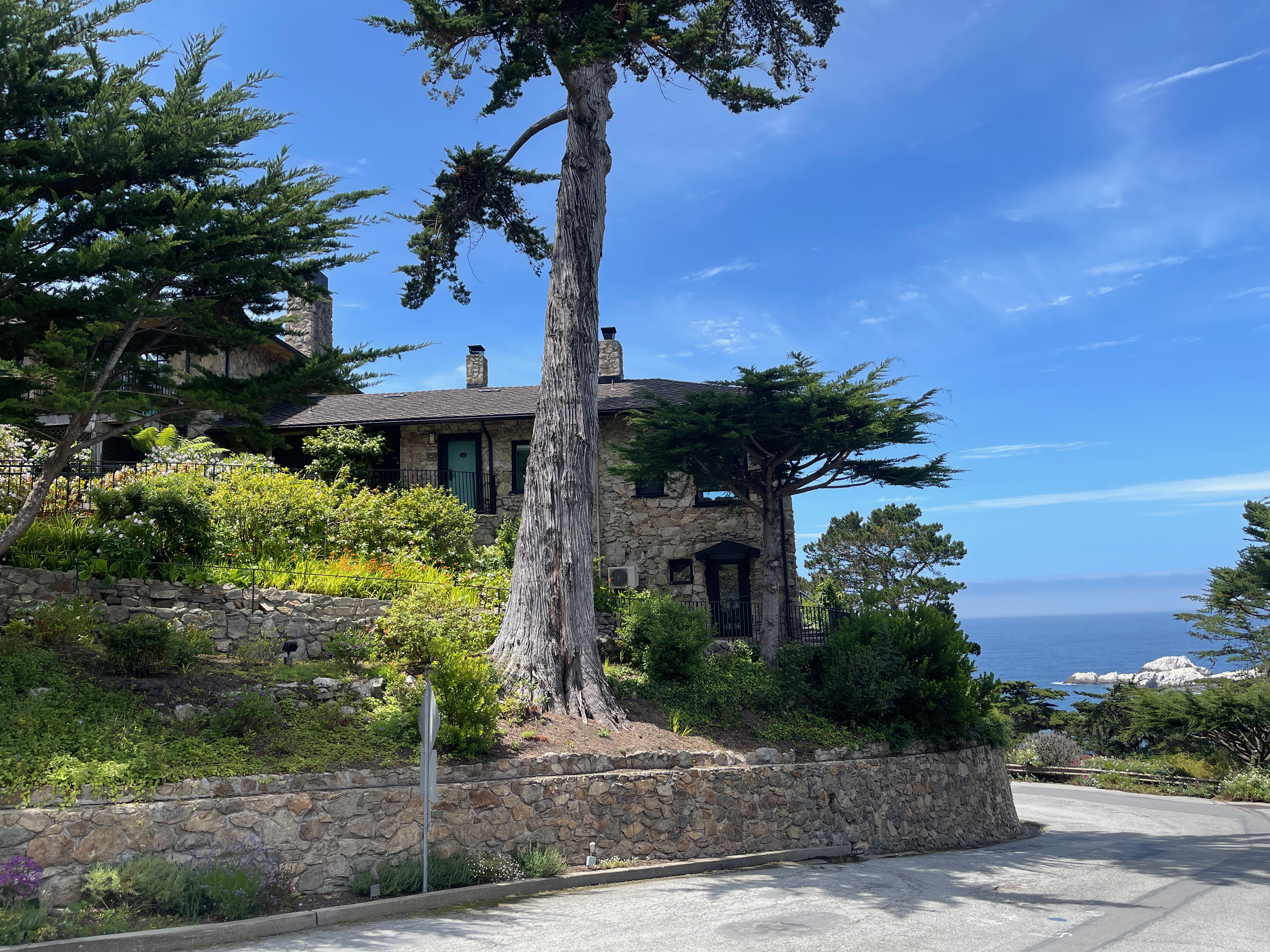
Highlands Inn building and driveway.

== See also ==
- List of hotels in the United States
- Timeline of Carmel-by-the-Sea, California
