= John O'Shea (disambiguation) =

John O'Shea (born 1981) is an Irish former footballer.

John O'Shea may also refer to:

- John O'Shea (director) (1920–2001), New Zealand film director
- John O'Shea (humanitarian) (born 1944), founder and CEO of GOAL, an Irish non-governmental organization
- John O'Shea (rugby union) (1940–2024), Wales international rugby union footballer
- John J. O'Shea, American physician and immunologist
- John O'Shea (darts player) (born 1975), Irish darts player
- John Joe O'Shea (born 1951), Irish darts player
- John Augustus O'Shea (1839–1905), Irish soldier, journalist and novelist
- A member of the stone carving family O'Shea and Whelan
- John O'Shea, commander of the 87th Division (United States)
- John O'Shea (artist) (1876–1956), California impressionist painter

== See also ==
- John Shea (disambiguation)
