= Rudolph Ulrich =

German-American landscape gardener (1840–1906)

Rudolph Ulrich (1840 – 1906) was born in Weimar, Saxe-Weimar-Eisenach. He immigrated to the United States in 1868. Trained as a landscape gardener in Europe, he built a successful career designing and installing gardens and grounds for private and public clients across the United States. Frederick Law Olmsted brought Ulrich in to assist with landscape design at the 1893 World's Columbian Exposition in Chicago, Illinois.

In Monterey, California, developer Charles Crocker hired Ulrich in 1881 as landscape superintendent at the Hotel Del Monte, now the Naval Postgraduate School. He became known for his "Arizona Garden" of desert plants. Leland Stanford subsequently hired Ulrich to create a similar garden at the Stanford estate; additional desert gardens were installed elsewhere in California, including one on the grounds of what is now Sunset Magazine's headquarters. Most of these gardens did not survive, however, two of Ulrich's Arizona Gardens have been restored, and remain today, on the grounds of Stanford University and the Naval Postgraduate School. In Santa Cruz, California, Ulrich did landscape design beginning in 1887 for the James Phelan (father of James D. Phelan) summer estate, known as "Phelan Park".
