= Mark Mills (architect) =

American architect

- Born: July 12, 1921; Jerome, Arizona, US
- Died: June 6, 2007 (aged 85); Carmel-by-the-Sea, California, US
- Occupation: Architect
- Practice: Frank Lloyd Wright at Taliesin West
- Buildings: Farrar House, or "Far-A-Way"

Mark Edward Mills (July 12, 1921 – June 6, 2007) was an American architect who worked during the latter half of the 20th century. He apprenticed for Frank Lloyd Wright at Taliesin West from 1944–1948. Mills adapted Wright's ideas by exploring the free-form possibilities of organic design by pouring concrete into molds, a technique in construction that allows for free-form exploration. Mills is known for his use of wood, glass, and stone. Imagination aided by a background in architectural engineering allowed him to push boundaries beyond other architects of his time. His designs were guided by his desire to use local materials, recyclable manufactured pieces, and wood as close to its original form as possible.

== Education ==
Mills graduated from Jerome High School in Arizona in 1940. He then attended the University of Arizona. He transferred to the University of Colorado, graduating with a Bachelor of Science degree in Architectural Engineering. After graduating he was invited to meet the renowned Frank Lloyd Wright. In 1944, Mills interviewed with Wright for an apprenticeship at his firm, Taliesin West. Subsequently, Mills moved to Scottsdale, Arizona, and spent the next four years working under Wright and learning about design and building from the ground up.

== Career ==
Upon graduating from the University of Colorado Mills got a job in Arizona working for the firm of Lescher and Mahoney. He maintained his job as a draftsman for Lescher and Mahoney for a short while before being invited to work under Frank Lloyd Wright in 1944. Mills left Taliesin West with his peer Paolo Soleri in 1948. It was also in 1948 that Nora Wood provided Mills and Soleri with their first commission in Cave Creek, Arizona. Their Cave Creek project, also known as the "Dome House", was published in Architectural Forum in 1961 along with R. Buckminster Fuller's and Friedrich Kiesler's works. All of which became benchmarks for young designers to break away from corporate modernism. Essentially, Mills and Soleri became pioneers of the design/build movement that swept North America throughout the next decade. After completing the "Dome House" Mills headed west to San Francisco.

In San Francisco Mills briefly worked for the firm of Anshen and Allen before moving to Carmel-by-the-Sea, California, and founding his practice. While at Anshen and Allen, Mills worked on some of Joseph Eichler's early models. He proceeded to work out of his home for the next 52 years until his death in 2007. During Mills' career he completed more than thirty houses; most of which were not publicized. However, Architectural Digest considers Mills as one of the world's top architects; featuring his Farrar, or "Far-A-Way", house in a 2009 issue.

Mills maintained a successful career on and around the Monterey Peninsula. While some of his work has been published in such magazines as House Beautiful and Architectural Digest, Mills didn't attract clients through publicity. Instead, his connections with the tight-nit community of interior designers, architects, and the affluent provided him with a steady number of clients.

== Publications ==
The following is a list of publications that featured Mark Mills works:

- House Beautiful, 1960
- House Beautiful, 1961
- House Beautiful, 1964
- LIFE Magazine, 1967
- Ladies Home Journal, 1968
- Los Angeles Times Home Magazine, 1969
- Liturgical Arts, 1971
- Form Function Finland,1993
- Journal of the Taliesin Fellows, 1993
- The Monterey County Herald, 1999
- The Carmel Pine Cone, 2003
- Dwell Magazine, 2004
- Carmel Magazine, 2006
- Homestyle By The Sea, 2008
- Architectural Digest, 2009
