= John Shea (disambiguation) =

John Shea (born 1949) is an American actor, film producer and stage director.

John Shea may also refer to:

- John Shea (mobster) (born 1965), Irish-American former mobster
- John Gilmary Shea (1824–1892), American historian
- John Joseph Shea (1898–1942), United States naval officer, namesake of the USS Shea
- John J. Shea Jr. (1924–2015), American ear surgeon
- John Shea (New Hampshire politician), American politician on the New Hampshire Executive Council
- John Shea Jr. (1928–2013), American politician, jurist, and businessman
- John Shea (Newfoundland politician) (1803–1858), journalist and political figure in Colony of Newfoundland
- John Shea (baseball) (1904–1956), American professional baseball pitcher in the late 1920s
- John Shea (cricketer) (1913–1986), Australian cricketer
- John Shea (playwright) (born 1964), American playwright
- John Shea (Indian Army officer) (1869–1966), British officer in the Indian Army
- John Shea (archeologist) (born 1960), American archaeologist and paleoanthropologist
- John Shea, a broadcaster with BBC World Service and, since 1994, with BBC Radio 3
- John Shea, longtime Harvard library official

== See also ==
- John O'Shea (disambiguation)
