= John O'Shea (artist) =

American painter

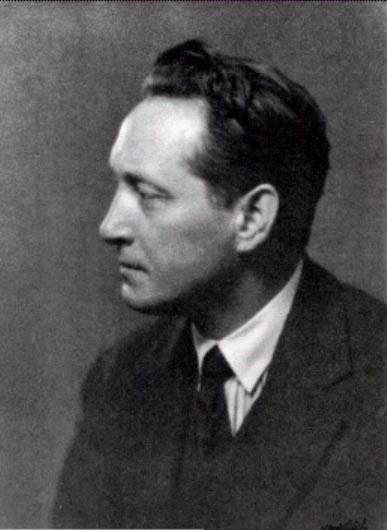
- John O'Shea (1876-1956)
- Born: John Garret O'Shea; 1876; Waterford, Ireland
- Died: 29 June 1956 (aged 80); Carmel Highlands, California, U.S.
- Occupation: Painter
- Known for: landscape painting
- Spouse: Mary D. Shaughnessy (m. 1922)
- Awards: California State Fair, 1941 (1st prize)

John O'Shea (1876 - April 29, 1956) was a California painter. His works are held in the permanent collections of several locations, including the Harrison Memorial Library, Monterey Museum of Art, Municipal Gallery of Modern Art, and the Bohemian Club.

== Early life ==
John O'Shea was born in 1876 in Ballintaylor, near Waterford, in southern Ireland.

== Career ==
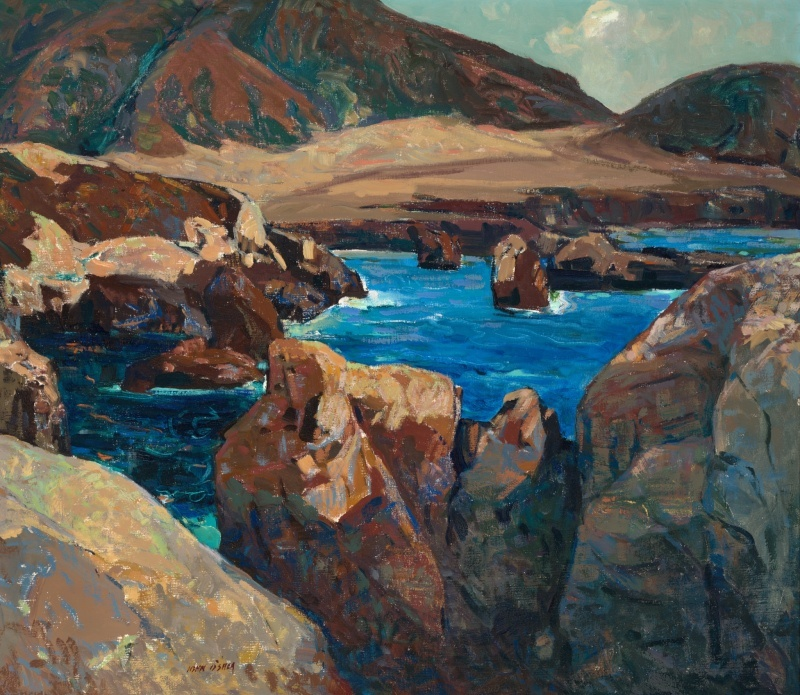
Carmel-by-the-Sea Seascape by John O'Shea (1927).

In 1913, O'Shea moved to Pasadena, California where he began his artistic career and began to exhibit his work. In 1921, O'Shea exhibited about 28 watercolors and oils in New York.

On May 25, 1922, O'Shea and Mary "Molly" D. Shaughnessy of Terre Haute, Indiana, were married in New York City. The couple then moved to Carmel, California where Molly had inherited 10-acre (0.040 km^{2}).

In 1926 and 1927, O'Shea made trips to Arizona with a close friend and artist Theodore Criley. Paintings from these excursions, like the Grand Canyon, resulted in art showings in Pasadena, Tucson, and San Francisco. In 1928, the O'Sheas traveled to Tahiti in the South Pacific where he painted landscapes and seascapes. He went to New Mexico in 1930, and painted places around Taos. O'Shea's wife died on October 8, 1941, at St. Luke's Hospital in San Francisco after a long illness.

The California Palace of the Legion of Honor in San Francisco, exhibited 36 of O'Shea's paintings in April and May 1934.

In November 1939, at the Bay Region Art Association's annual at the Oakland Art Gallery, he won first prize for a watercolor called "Old Trees, Monterey." In 1942, O'Shea had a solo show at the Bohemian Club in San Francisco.

== Death ==
O'Shea died at home on April 29, 1956, at age 80.
