= Jane Stanford =

American philanthropist, co-founder of Stanford University, first lady of California

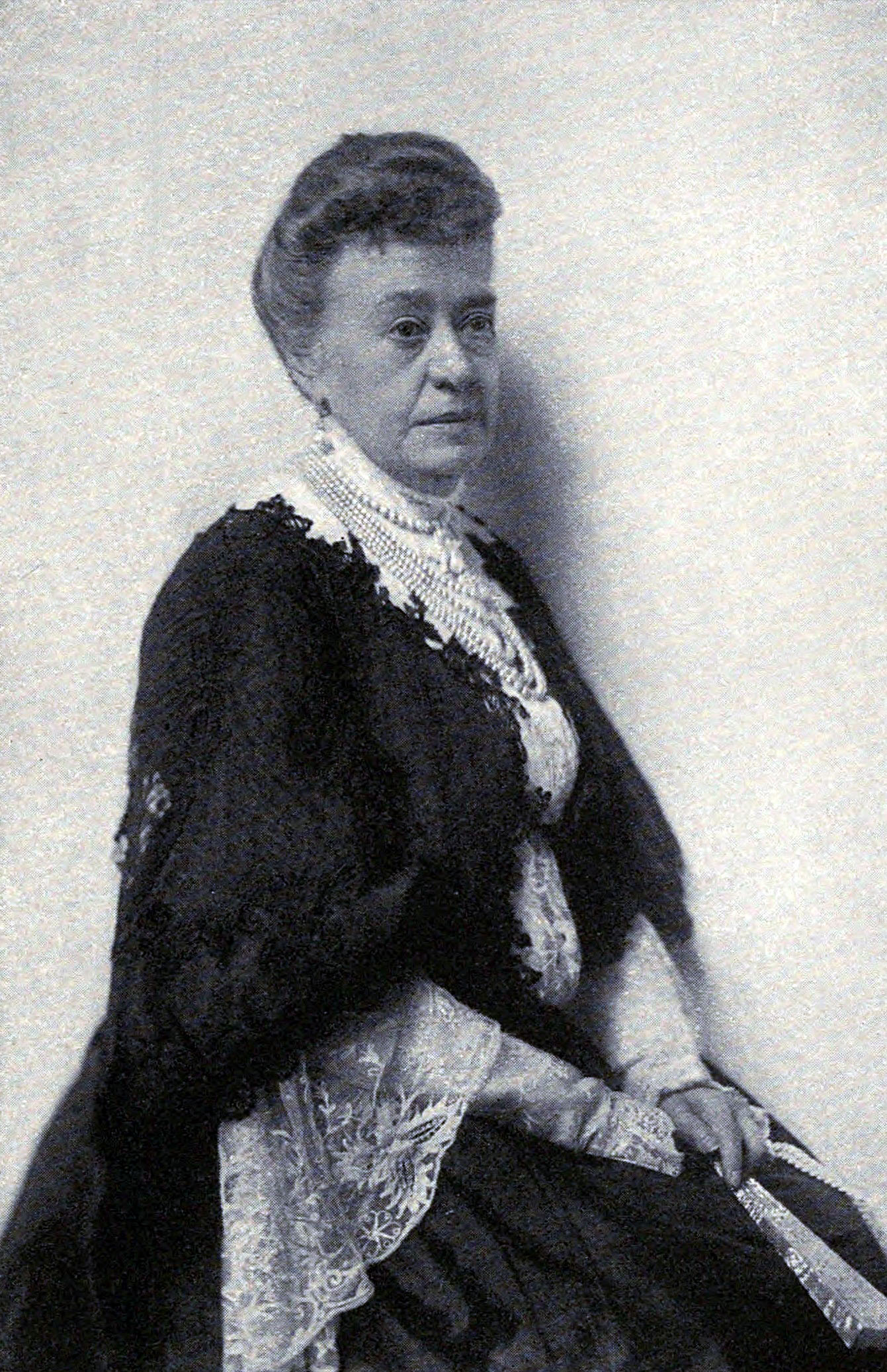

8th First Lady of California
- In role January 10, 1862 – December 10, 1863
- Governor: Leland Stanford
- Preceded by: Maria Downey
- Succeeded by: Mollie Low

Personal details
- Born: Jane Elizabeth Lathrop; August 25, 1828 Albany, New York, U.S.
- Died: February 28, 1905 (aged 76) Honolulu, Territory of Hawaii
- Resting place: Stanford Mausoleum, Stanford, California
- Spouse: Leland Stanford (m. 1850; died 1893)
- Children: Leland Stanford Jr.
- Occupation: Social entrepreneur, philanthropist
- Known for: Co-founder of Stanford University

Jane Elizabeth Lathrop Stanford (August 25, 1828 – February 28, 1905) was an American philanthropist and co-founder in 1885 of Stanford University (opened 1891) with her husband Leland Stanford, in memory of their only child, Leland Stanford Jr., who died of typhoid fever in 1884 at age 15.

After her husband's death in 1893, Jane Stanford funded and operated the university almost single-handedly until her unsolved murder by strychnine poisoning in 1905.

Jane Stanford was the eighth First Lady of California. Her husband served as governor from January 10, 1862, to December 10, 1863.

== Early life ==
Born Jane Elizabeth Lathrop in Albany, New York, she was the daughter of shopkeeper Dyer Lathrop and Jane Anne (Shields) Lathrop. Jane attended The Albany Academy for Girls, the longest-running girls' day school in the country. She was the second of six siblings:

- Daniel Shields Lathrop (1825–1883)
- Jane Elizabeth Lathrop (8/25/1828-2/28/1905)
- Ariel (1830–1908)
- Anna Maria Lathrop (9/3/1832 – March 8, 1892) (married David Hewes)
- Henry Clay Lathrop (May 20, 1844 – March 4, 1899)
- Charles Gardner Lathrop (5/11/1849 – May 24, 1914)

== Marriage ==
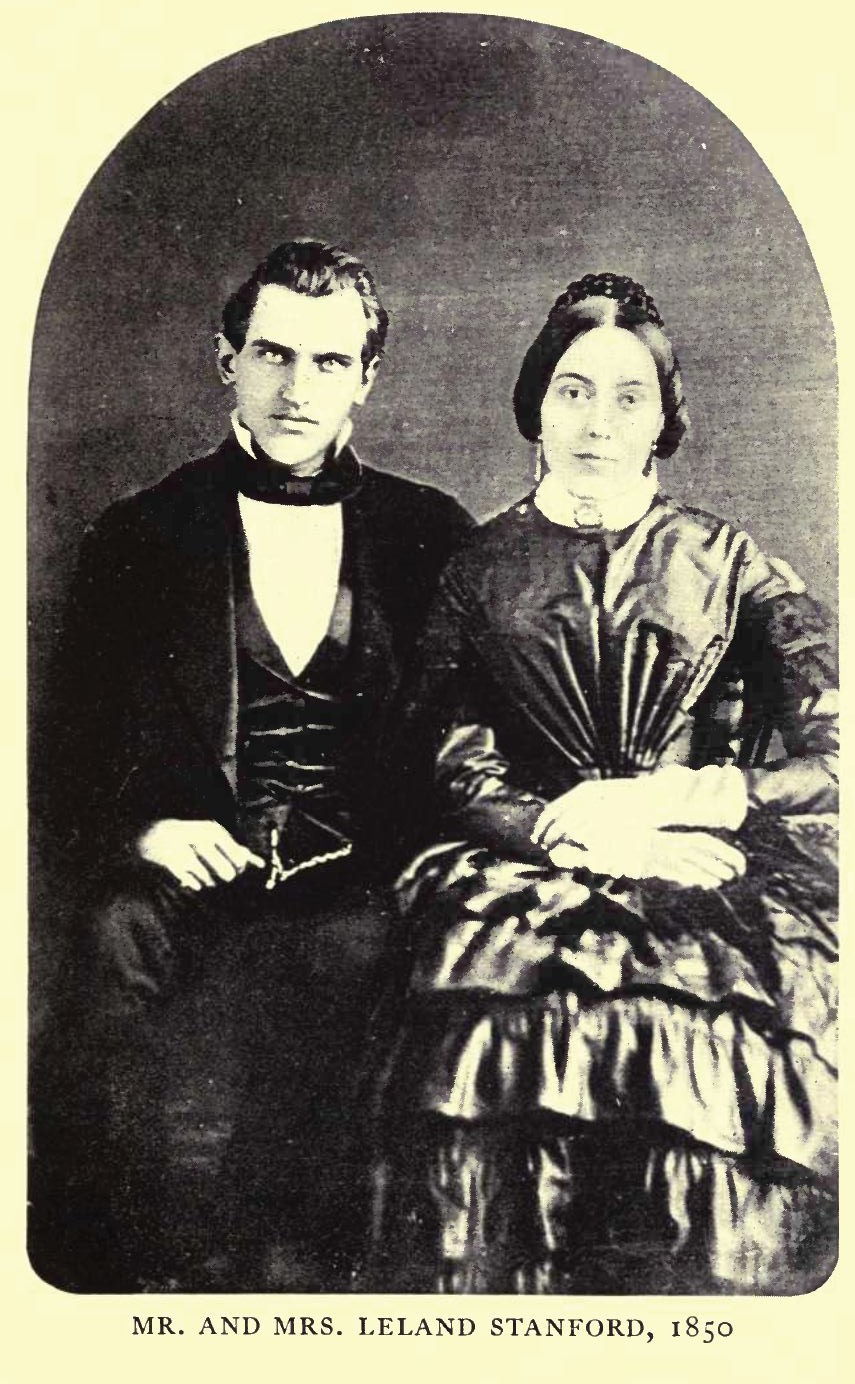
Portrait of Leland and Jane Stanford in 1850

Lathrop married Leland Stanford on September 30, 1850.

The Stanfords lived in Port Washington, Wisconsin until 1852, when Leland Stanford's law library and other property were lost to fire; they then returned to Albany, New York. Leland Stanford went to California to join his brothers in mercantile businesses related to the California Gold Rush, and Jane remained in Albany with her family. He returned in 1855, and the following year, they moved to San Francisco, where he engaged in mercantile pursuits on a large scale. Leland Stanford was a co-founder of the Central Pacific Railroad and served as its president from 1861 until his death in 1893. Leland was president of the Southern Pacific Railroad, served as governor of California from 1862 to 1863, and was a United States senator from California from 1885 until his death in 1893.

On May 14, 1868, Jane Stanford gave birth to a son, Leland Stanford, Jr., at age 39. He died at age 15 on March 13, 1884, of typhoid fever while the family was in Florence, Italy.

== Stanford University ==
Following their son's death, Jane and Leland Stanford sought ways to memorialize him. Before they left Europe in April 1884, with his remains, they changed their wills to give everything to a proposed institution at Palo Alto. In November 1885, they created foundational plans for the Leland Stanford Junior University, which opened on October 1, 1891. After her husband's death on June 21, 1893, Jane Stanford effectively took control of the university. The university struggled financially in this period and the trustees advocated a temporary closure of the university until tax and legal issues could be resolved. From 1893 to 1898, she collected $10,000 per month from the university, as its co-founder. The estate left probate in 1898. As the remaining founder, she wielded a great deal of legal control over the university until her death.

It was at Jane Stanford's direction that Stanford University gained an early focus on the arts. She also advocated for the admission of women; the university had been co-educational since its founding. She took a strong position on the issue of academic freedom when Stanford sought and ultimately succeeded in having Stanford University economist Edward A. Ross fired. Ross had made speeches favoring the Democrat William Jennings Bryan, had collectivist economic teachings, favored racism against Chinese American "coolies", and outlined eugenics policies directed against Chinese people and other racial groups. (Note: This case resulted in the American Association of University Professors' "Report on Academic Freedom and Tenure" of 1915, by Arthur Oncken Lovejoy and Edwin R.A. Seligman, and in the AAUP 1915 Declaration of Principles.)

Jane Stanford traveled to London in 1897, the year of Queen Victoria's Diamond Jubilee, in hopes of selling her rubies and other jewels to raise funds for the university, but was disappointed in the prices offered and returned home with most of her jewelry intact. In 1905, Stanford directed the university trustees to sell her jewels after her death and use the funds as a permanent endowment "to be used exclusively for the purchase of books and other publications". The board of trustees confirmed that arrangement, and the Jewel Fund continues to add to the university's library collections. The endowment, originally $500,000, is now worth about $20 million. Items purchased through the Jewel Fund display a distinctive bookplate that depicts a romanticized Jane Stanford offering her jewels to Athena, the Greek goddess of wisdom. Since 2007, benefactors who provide endowments for library acquisitions are referred to as members of the Jewel Society.

== Death ==
On February 28, 1905, Stanford died in Hawaii, where she had traveled after a failed poisoning attempt in San Francisco. The verdict in Hawaii was that Stanford had died of strychnine poisoning. However, David Starr Jordan, the president of Stanford, immediately went to Hawaii, where he suppressed the report of poisoning and insisted that she had died of natural causes. Jordan's coverup was accepted as the truth for decades.

Earlier, on January 14, 1905, at her Nob Hill mansion in San Francisco, Stanford consumed mineral water that tasted bitter. She quickly forced herself to vomit the water with prompting from and assistance by her maid, and when both the maid and her secretary agreed that the bottled water tasted strange, she sent it to a pharmacy to be analyzed. The findings, returned a few weeks later, showed that the water had been poisoned with a lethal dose of strychnine. (Note: The assay measured 0.8 grains (52 mg) per glass-full (a fatal human dose for an adult can be as little as 30 mg). The water also contained the alkaloid brucine and other substances, suggesting that the source was a rodent poison derived from the tree Strychnos nux-vomica. It was incorrectly reported in the press at the time that the amount of strychnine in a glass of the Poland Spring water was far in excess of a fatal dose.) Stanford moved out of her mansion and vowed never to return. Elizabeth Richmond, the maid, fell under suspicion and was dismissed. (Richmond had worked in Britain and had reportedly regaled Stanford's domestic staff with tales of English aristocrats being poisoned by their servants.)

The Harry Morse Detective and Patrol Agency was retained for a discreet investigation of the incident. Its detectives put Richmond under surveillance and scoured records of Bay Area pharmacies for possibly-suspicious purchases of strychnine but found none. The agency learned that the mansion was a hothouse of petty staff jealousies, graft, and intrigue, but it could not come up with evidence pointing to a culprit or a motive for an attempted murder. Depressed by the conviction that an unknown party had tried to kill her and suffering from a cold, Stanford soon decided to sail to Hawaii, with plans to continue on to Japan. The Stanford party left San Francisco for Honolulu on February 15, 1905.

At the Moana Hotel on the island of Oahu on the evening of February 28, Stanford asked for bicarbonate of soda to settle her stomach while in her room. (Note: The room in which she stayed, number 120, no longer exists since it has been incorporated into an expansion of the lobby.) Her personal secretary, Bertha Berner (a trusted employee of 20 years' standing and the only other person present who had also been at the scene of the previous incident), prepared the solution, which Stanford drank. (Note: Stanford also took a cascara capsule, an herbal laxative preparation.) At 11:15 p.m., Stanford cried out for her servants and hotel staff to call for a physician, declared that she had lost control of her body, and believed that she had been poisoned again. This time, attempts to induce vomiting were unsuccessful. Robert Cutler, a retired Stanford neurologist, recounted in The Mysterious Death of Jane Stanford what took place upon the arrival of Francis Howard Humphris, the hotel physician:

As Humphris tried to administer a solution of bromine and chloral hydrate, (Note: Anticonvulsants) Mrs. Stanford, now in anguish, exclaimed, 'My jaws are stiff. This is a horrible death to die.' Whereupon she was seized by a tetanic spasm that progressed relentlessly to a state of severe rigidity: her jaws clamped shut, her thighs opened widely, her feet twisted inwards, her fingers and thumbs clenched into tight fists, and her head drew back. Finally, her respiration ceased. Stanford was dead from strychnine poisoning.

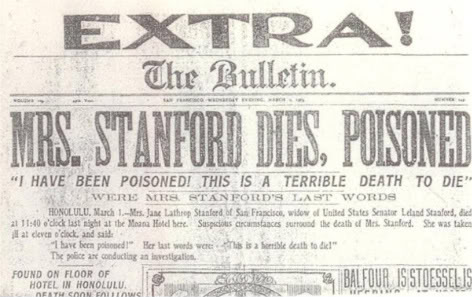
Headline of the San Francisco Evening Bulletin on March 1, 1905, reporting Stanford's death.

The San Francisco Evening Bulletin trumpeted the news with the March 1 headline "Mrs. Stanford Dies, Poisoned." Forensic chemical analysis revealed the presence of a pure form of strychnine in samples from the bicarbonate she had taken, (Note: Seeds of Strychnos nux-vomica contain brucine and strychnine in a ratio of about 1 to 2, and the former is about twice as bitter as the latter but only one fortieth as toxic and so a dangerous level of strychnine would taste about half as bitter in pure form than as a component of the seed. In addition, it has been reported that sodium ion suppresses perception of bitter tastes. Thus, the method employed in the second poisoning attempt would have made it more difficult to detect the bitter taste that had foiled the first attempt.) as well as traces of the poison in her tissues. (Note: A small, nonlethal, amount of strychnine was also detected in the cascara capsules, which contained a mixture of Rhamnus purshiana and Strychnos nux-vomica; however, strychnine is a natural component of the latter.) After hearing three days of testimony, the coroner's jury concluded in less than two minutes that she had died of strychnine "introduced into a bottle of bicarbonate of soda with felonious intent by some person or persons to this jury unknown." The testimony revealed that the bottle in question had been purchased in California (after Richmond had been let go), had been accessible to anyone in Stanford's residence during the period when her party was packing, and had not been used until the night of her death. (Note: Berner was quickly dismissed as a suspect at the time based on her longstanding and apparently good relationship with Stanford. However, her testimony and repeatedly shifting accounts of the incident, which seem to be designed to cast doubt on poisoning as the cause of death, have aroused suspicion.)

The jury's quick verdict was to prove controversial. A March 11, 1905, dispatch in The New York Times stated that the verdict was "written out with the knowledge and assistance of Deputy High Sheriff Rawlins" and implied that the jurors had been coached on the conclusion to reach. The controversy was largely stoked by Stanford University President David Starr Jordan, who had sailed to Hawaii himself and hired a local doctor, Ernest Coniston Waterhouse, to dispute poisoning as the cause of death. He then reported to the press that Stanford had in fact died of heart failure, (Note: Jordan also publicly disparaged the view that the poisoned Poland Spring water incident represented a murder attempt.) a "medically preposterous" diagnosis given the dramatic and highly distinctive symptoms of strychnine poisoning that she had displayed. (Note: Jordan was well aware of at least some of strychnine's properties.) (Note: The only other common medical condition that produces similar symptoms, tetanus, has a much more gradual onset and can usually be linked to an observable wound or infection.)

In his book, Cutler concluded, "There is ample evidence that Mrs. Stanford was poisoned, that she was given good care, and that Jordan went over there to hush it up." Stanford had long had a difficult relationship with Jordan. At the time of her death, she was president of the university's board of trustees and was reportedly planning to remove him from his position.

Jordan's motives for involvement in the case are uncertain, but he had written to the new president of Stanford's board of trustees, offered several alternate explanations for Jane Stanford's death, and suggested to select whichever would be most suitable. The university leadership may have believed that avoiding the appearance of scandal was of overriding importance. (Note: Jordan also expressed concern that the press accounts of Stanford's death were unfairly damaging Berner's reputation.) The coverup succeeded so well that the likelihood that she was murdered was largely overlooked by historians and commentators until the 1980s. (Note: Both Jordan and Berner later wrote glowing accounts of Stanford that attributed her death to coronary disease and either failed to mention or made light of the strychnine poisoning incidents.) In 2022, Stanford University historian Richard White concluded that Stanford was likely poisoned by her employee Bertha Berner, who was the only person present at both poisonings. White concludes that the first poisoning may have been intended to be non fatal and that Jordan and the San Francisco Police likely suspected Berner but covered up the murder to suit their own interests.

The source of the strychnine was never identified. Stanford was buried alongside her husband, Leland, and their son at the Stanford family mausoleum on the Stanford campus.

== Recognition ==
Jane Lathrop Stanford Middle School (JLS Middle School) in the Palo Alto Unified School District was named after Stanford in 1985. The town of Lathrop, California in San Joaquin County was developed by her husband's railroad company in the late 1860s and named after Jane and her brother Charles Lathrop.
