= Hotel Del Monte =

Former hotel; current site of the U.S. Naval Postgraduate School

Coordinates: 36°35′52″N 121°52′24″W

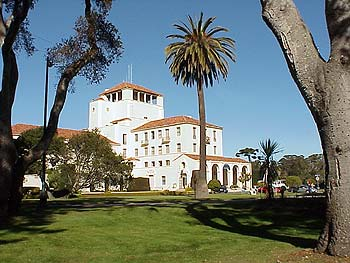
- The former Hotel Del Monte, now known as Herrmann Hall
- Interactive map of Hotel Del Monte
- Location: Naval Postgraduate School, Monterey, California

History
- Built: 1879-1880
- Rebuilt: 1887-1888; 1925–1926

Site notes
- Architect(s): Arthur Brown Sr., Lewis P. Hobart, Clarence A. Tantau
- Architectural styles: Spanish Revival; Victorian
- Owner: Naval Postgraduate School, United States Navy

The Hotel Del Monte was a luxury resort hotel complex in Monterey, California, from its opening in 1880 until falling into decline during World War II, ceasing operations in 1942. At its height, its properties comprised some 20,000 acres in Monterey, Pacific Grove, Pebble Beach, and Carmel Valley, encompassing eight golf courses (including Spyglass Hill, Cypress Point, Pebble Beach and the Monterey Peninsula Country Club), polo grounds, hunting lodges, swimming complexes, and a race track. The vast resort and sports complex was acclaimed as one of the finest in North America, attracting distinguished visitors, royalty, artists, writers and actors, and hosting lavish parties such as Salvador Dalí's memorable 1941 "A Surrealistic Night in an Enchanted Forest”.

During World War II, with luxury travel at a standstill, the hotel and land were leased to the United States Navy for use as a pre-flight training school, with an estimated 2000 cadets passing through its doors. In 1947, the U.S. Navy purchased the hotel and its surrounding 627 acres for $2.5 million. Initially, the former hotel was used as a school for enlisted men who spent three of their 11-month course being trained as electronic technicians. In 1951, the United States Naval Academy's postgraduate school was relocated from Annapolis, Maryland to Monterey, ostensibly to better separate active duty junior officer students from Academy cadets.

== History ==
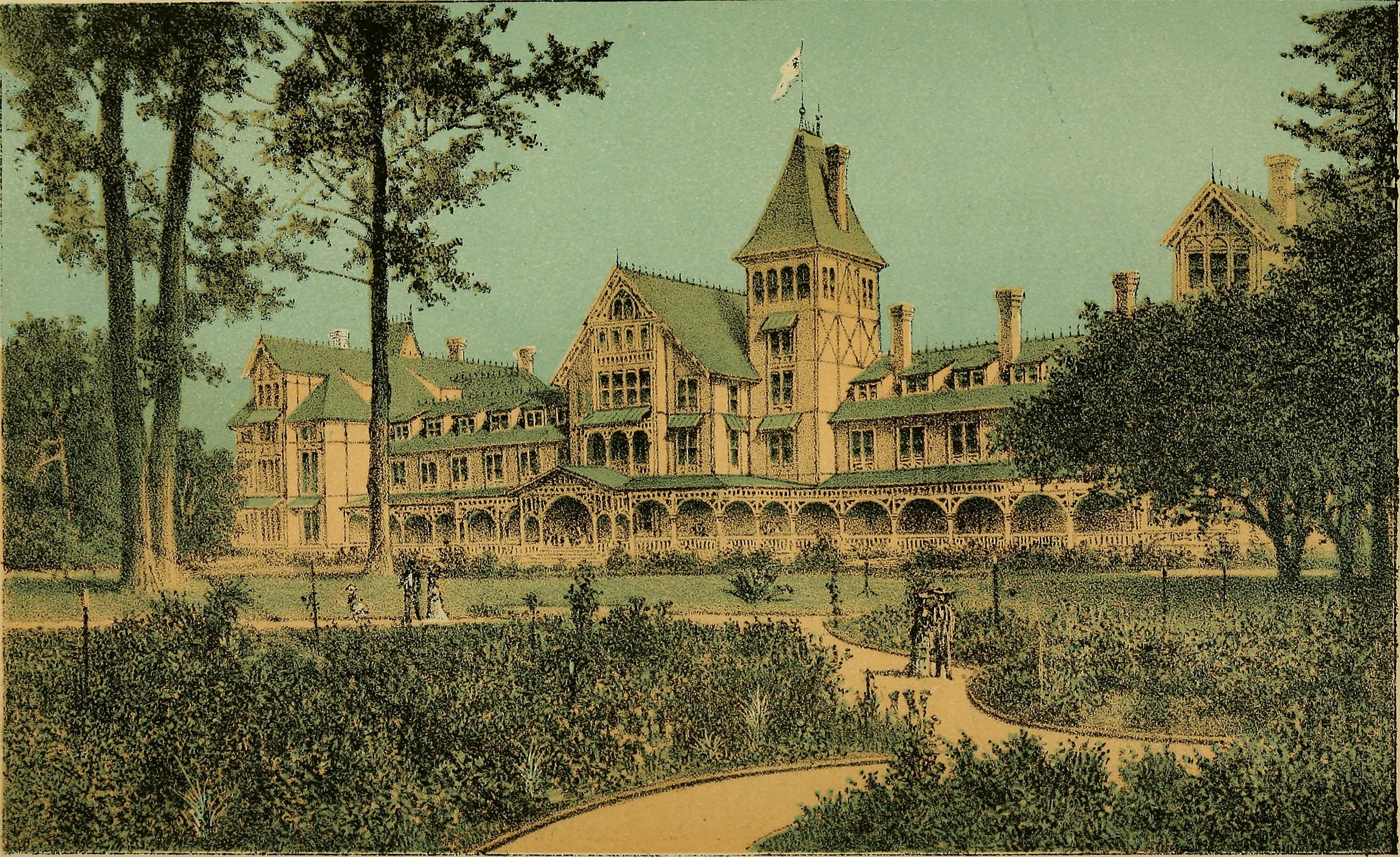
Original hotel building, c. 1883

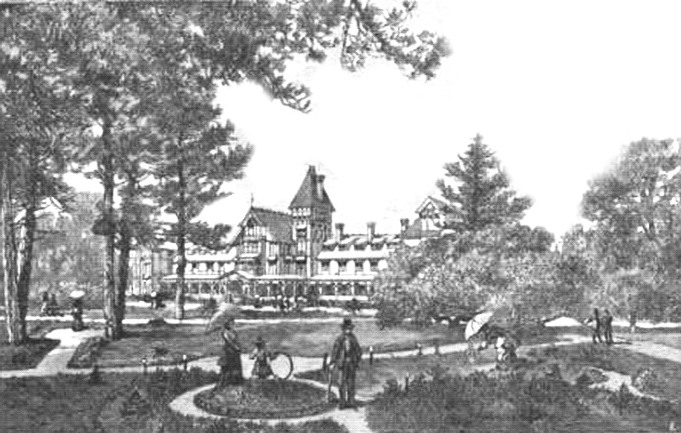
Drawing of hotel grounds from the book Mexico, California and Arizona; being a new and revised edition of Old Mexico and her lost provinces. (1900)

Charles Crocker, one of California's Big Four railroad barons, established the initial 7,000-acre resort with its 125 acre botanical gardens through the Southern Pacific Railroad's property division, Pacific Improvement Company (PIC), and opened the first hotel on June 3, 1880. The first true resort complex in the United States, it was an immediate success, turning down over 3,000 reservation requests in its first six months. The property was serviced by a privately owned narrow-gauge railway depot where the Del Monte (named for the hotel) delivered patrons arriving by train.

The property extended south and southeast of the hotel and included gardens, parkland, polo grounds, a race track, and a golf course. A dairy and market gardens provided fresh milk and produce for hotel guests. Originally used for hunting and other outdoor activities, the hotel's property became Pebble Beach, an unincorporated resort community, and the world-famous Pebble Beach Golf Links. The famous 17-Mile Drive was designed as a local excursion for visitors to the Del Monte to take in the historic sights of Monterey and Pacific Grove, and the scenery of what would become Pebble Beach. The hotel became popular with the wealthy and influential of the day, and guests included presidents Rutherford B. Hayes and Theodore Roosevelt, writers and artists including Ernest Hemingway and Salvador Dalí, as well as many early Hollywood stars such as Alfred Hitchcock, Bing Crosby, Jean Harlow, William Powell, Ginger Rogers and Bob Hope.

In 1919, Samuel F.B. Morse, an American environmental conservationist, put together a consortium of investors to purchase the aging Hotel Del Monte, along with 18,000 acres on the Monterey Peninsula, Pebble Beach and Carmel Valley for the sum of $1.34 million, and established the Del Monte Properties Company, forerunner of today's Pebble Beach Company.

== Attractions ==
The hotel's luxury shops included branches of Gump's, I. Magnin and City of Paris.

The Del Monte Golf Course opened in 1897 as a public club. The Del Monte Cup championships were played at the Del Monte Golf Course beginning in 1898, and was open for men and women. It is one the oldest continuously operating golf courses in the United States, and the oldest west of the Mississippi River. The first Pacific Coast Golf Association (PCGA) Women's Championship and the first PCGA Open were held at the Del Monte Golf Course.

In 1907 an art gallery was established at the hotel which exclusively showcased California artists including Francis McComas, Ferdinand Burgdorff and Jo Mora.

The Roman Plunge Pool Complex, built in 1918 and designed by Lewis P. Hobart and Clarence A. Tantau, later the architects of the third hotel building. The pool itself was designed by Hobart. The Roman Plunge Solarium was restored in 2012 by architect James D. McCord. At that time the main Plunge was reconstructed as a reflecting pool and its original above-ground finishes restored.

The c. 1881 Arizona Garden, a formal Victorian garden featuring desert and subtropical plants originally designed by landscape architect Rudolph Ulrich, was restored by the U.S. Navy in 1993-1995. Ulrich's intricate hedge maze no longer exists, having been removed during the hotel's 1920s reconstruction.

Under Morse's guidance, the Hotel Del Monte's recreational properties grew to include eight golf courses, a race track, polo grounds, and two swimming complexes, as well as numerous trails and hunting lodges.

== Fires, earthquake and rebuilding ==
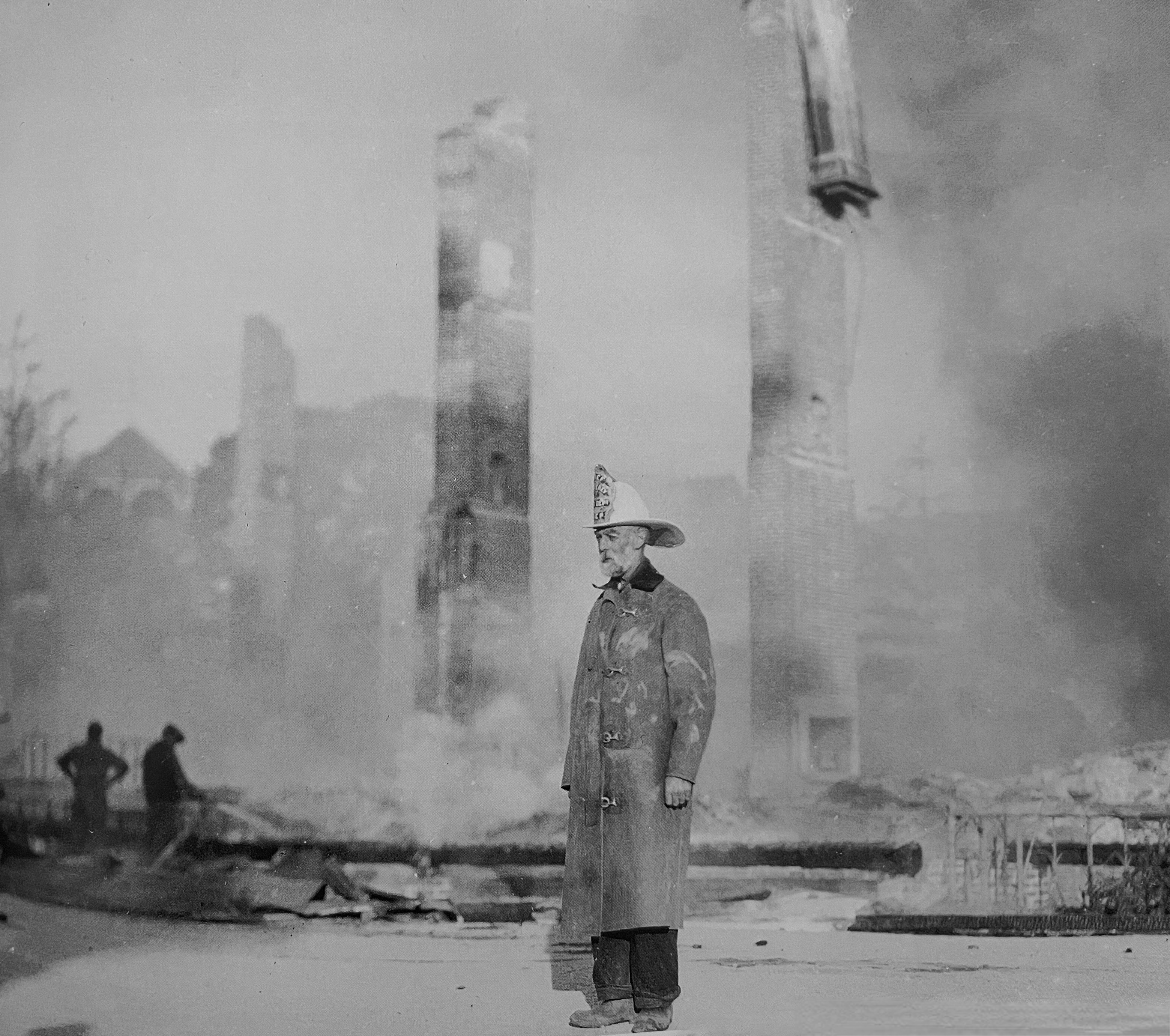
Monterey's first Fire Chief, William "Billy" Parker, stands amid the ruins of the smouldering Hotel Del Monte, September 28, 1924, the second time the hotel burned to the ground.

The Hotel Del Monte burned twice, in 1887 and 1924. Both times it was rebuilt and expanded. The original building was designed by architect Arthur Brown Sr., who had been the Southern Pacific Railroad's Superintendent of Bridges and Buildings. The first hotel was destroyed by fire on June 1, 1887 and was replaced with a main building and two large wings to accommodate increased numbers of guests; these two wings still exist today.

Two hotel guests were killed and the main building was damaged in the 1906 San Francisco earthquake, but the resort was quickly repaired.

On September 27, 1924, the main hotel building was again destroyed by fire. Samuel F.B. Morse and Carl Stanley worked with architects Lewis P. Hobart and Clarence A. Tantau to create the Spanish Revival Hotel Del Monte which was dedicated in May 1926. This building was renamed Herrmann Hall by the U.S. Navy on 31 May 1956, and serves as the administration building to the Naval Postgraduate School. The two Victorian-era wings of the complex received new facades during the 1925-1926 reconstruction, and now serve as living quarters for students attending the school, as well as hotel rooms for visiting dignitaries and conference attendees.

== Image gallery ==
Historic images
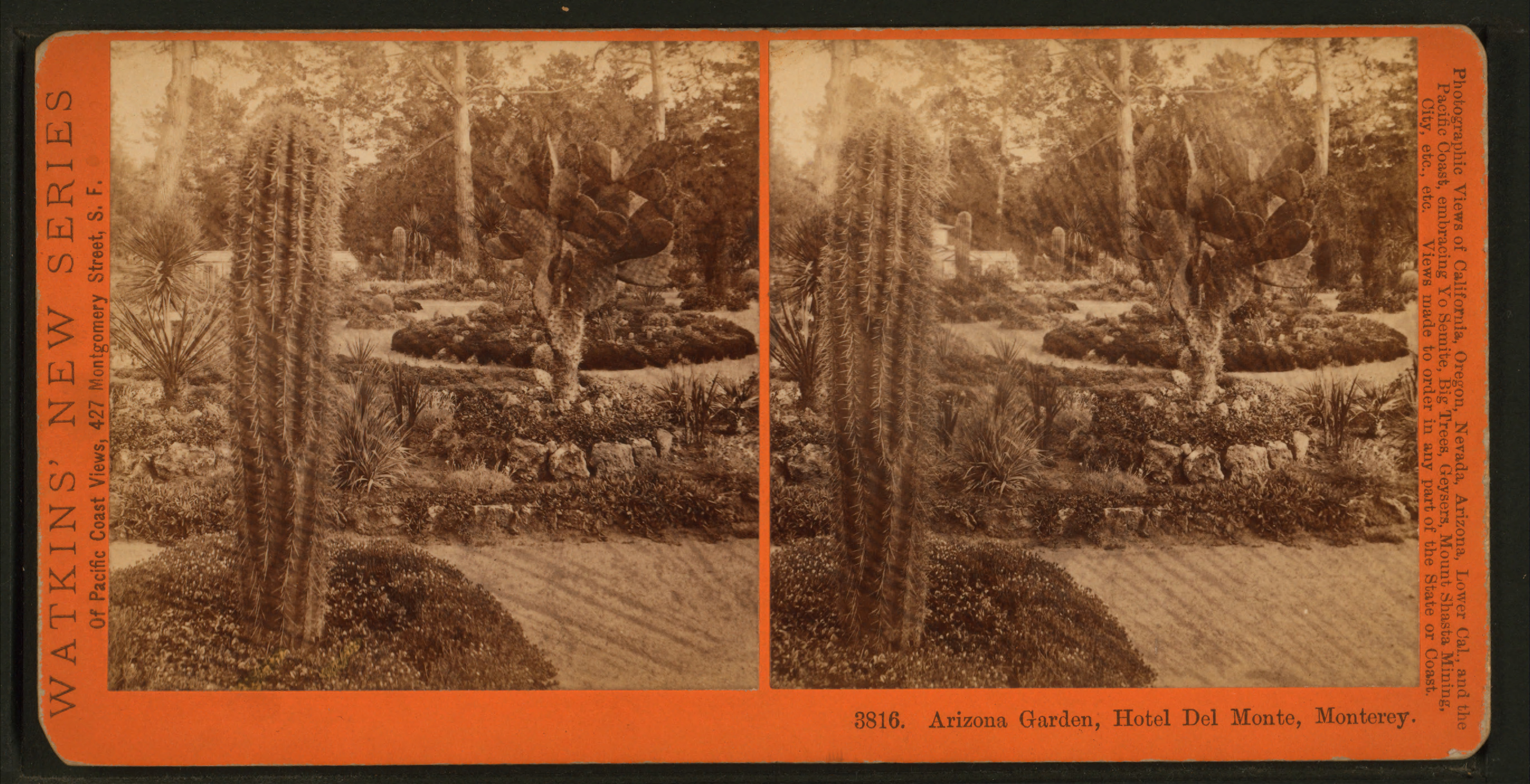
Stereoscopic view of the Arizona Garden, Hotel Del Monte, Monterey, c. 1885

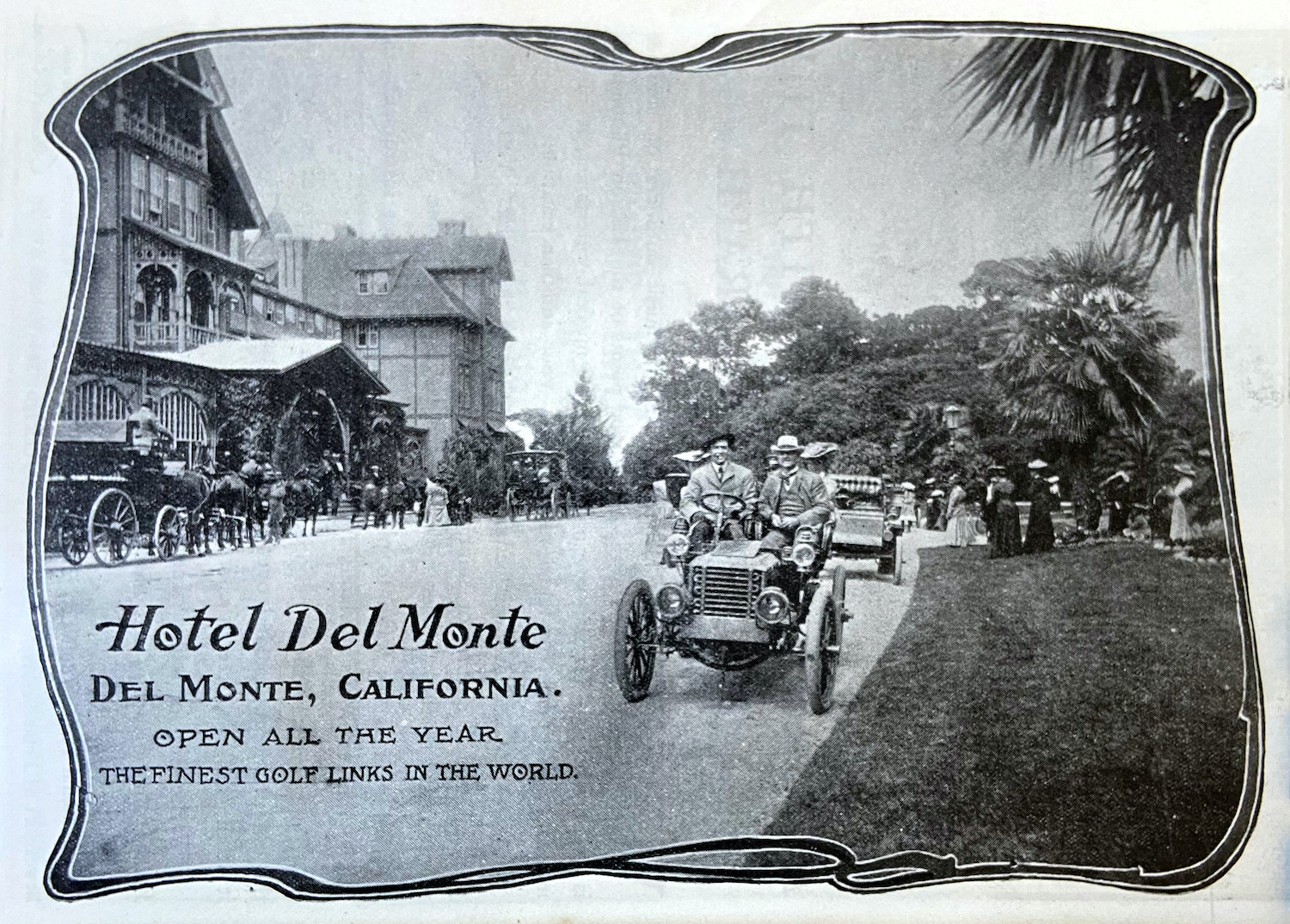
Advertisement for the Hotel Del Monte in Sunset magazine, c. 1906

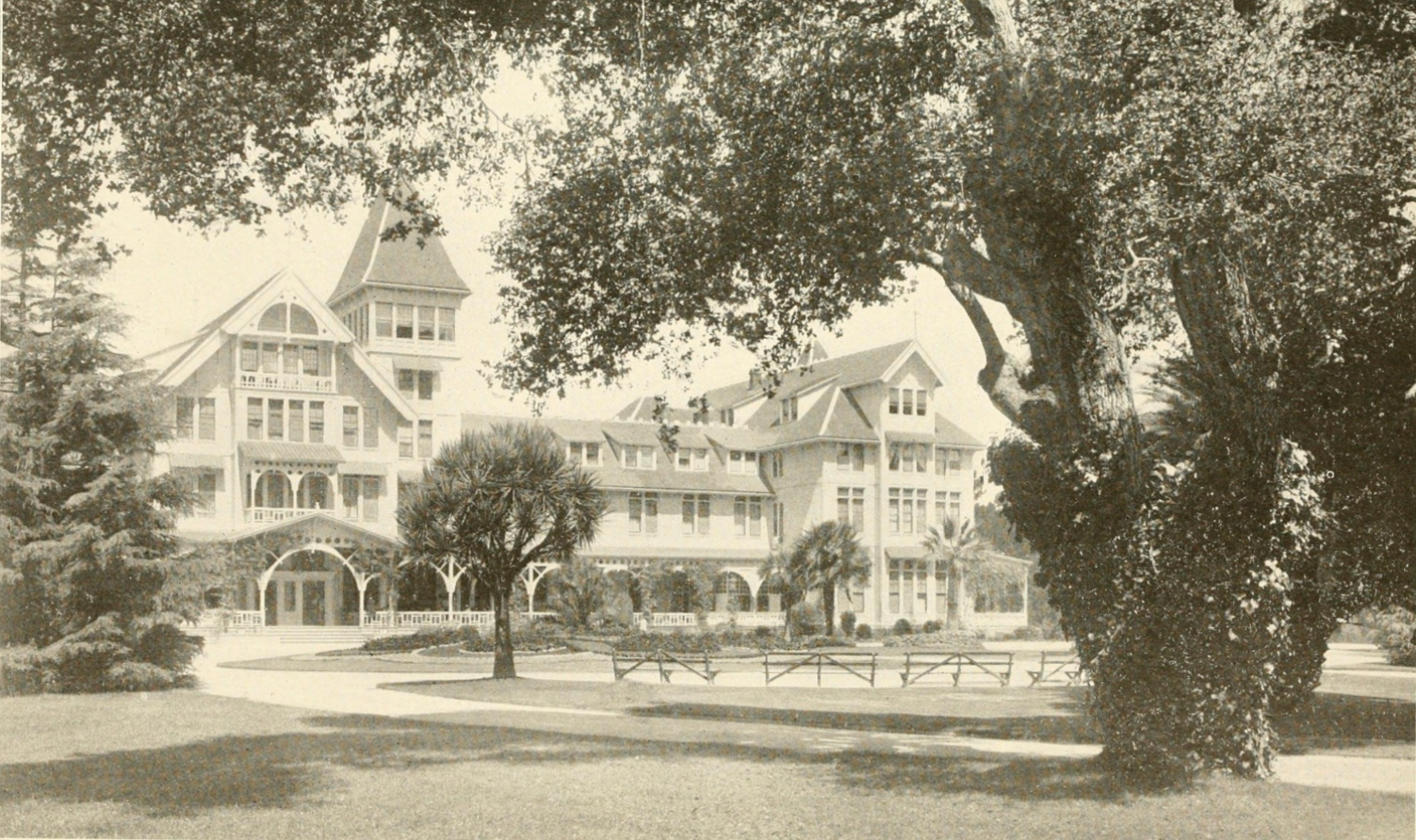
The second Hotel Del Monte, 1915

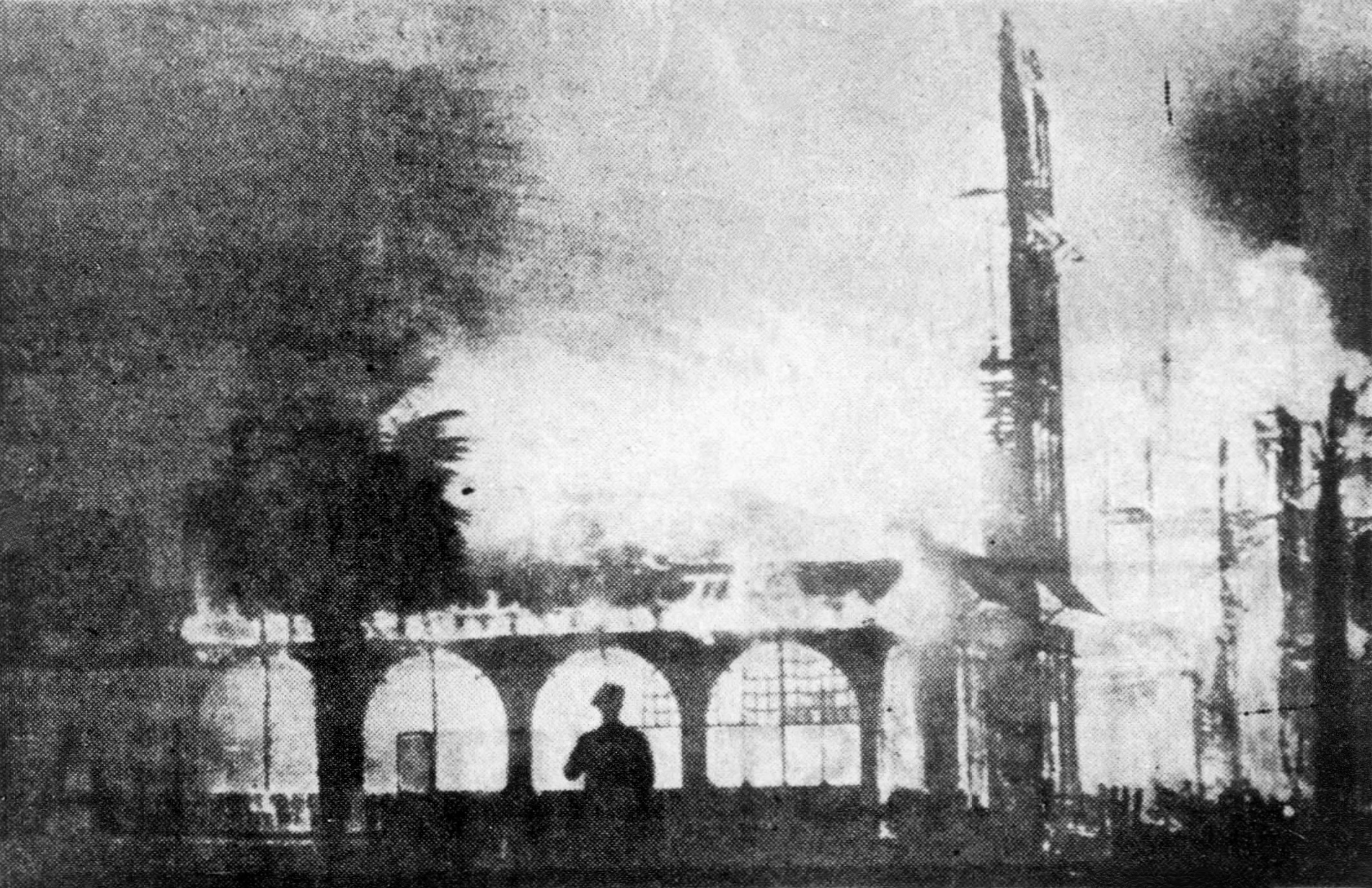
Fire destroyed the main building of the second Hotel Del Monte on September 27, 1924.

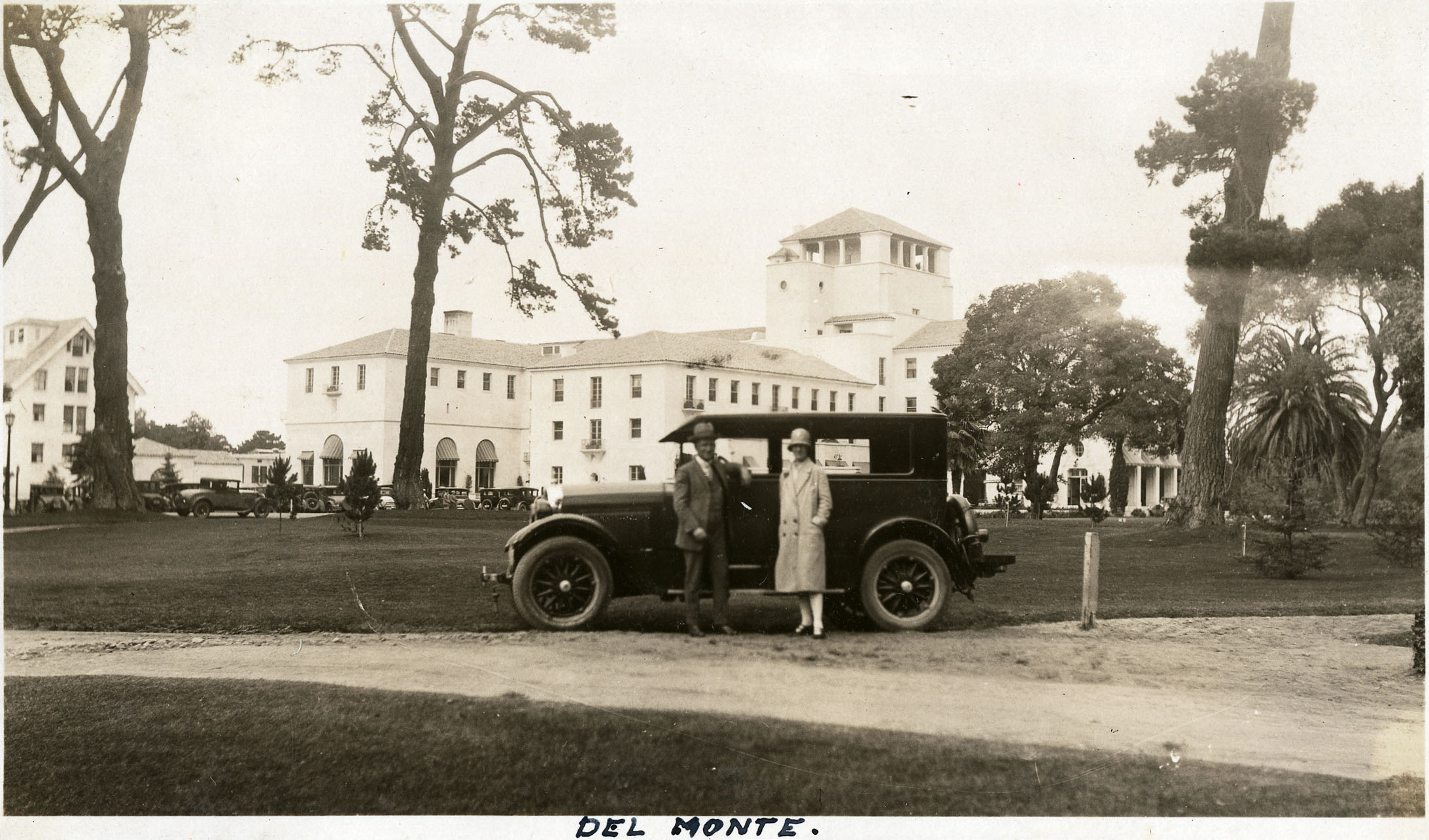
William and Grace McCarthy standing with an automobile in front of the third Hotel Del Monte

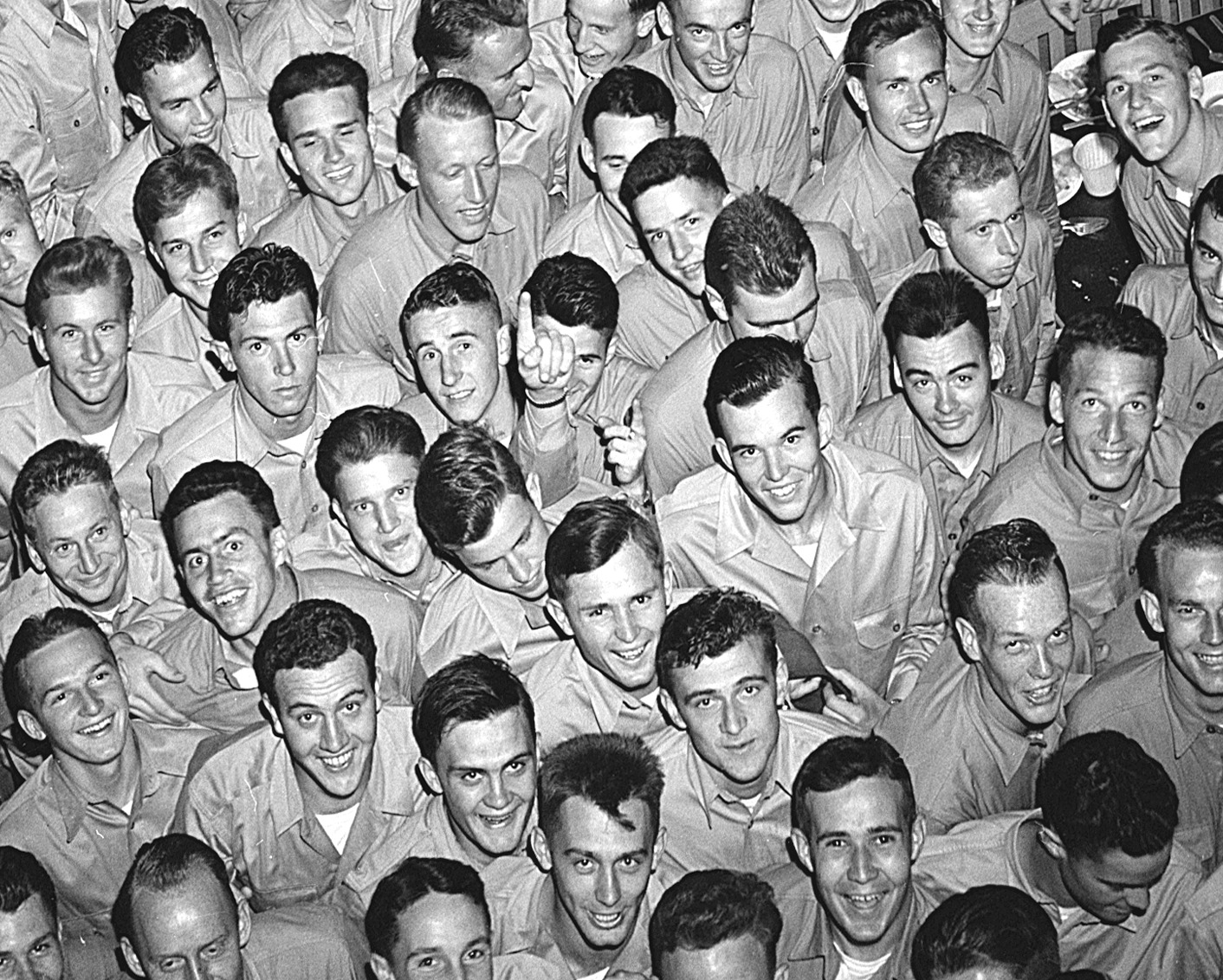
Young men training at the U.S. Navy's pre-flight school at Hotel Del Monte grin as they file out of the resort's former formal dining room, now a mess hall, July 1943

== Related ==
Today's Del Monte Foods, Inc., an American food production and distribution company, traces its name back to an Oakland, California, food distributor who used the brand name "Del Monte" for a premium coffee blend made especially for the guests of the Hotel Del Monte.
