= Ira Mallory Remsen =

American playwright and painter

Ira Remsen
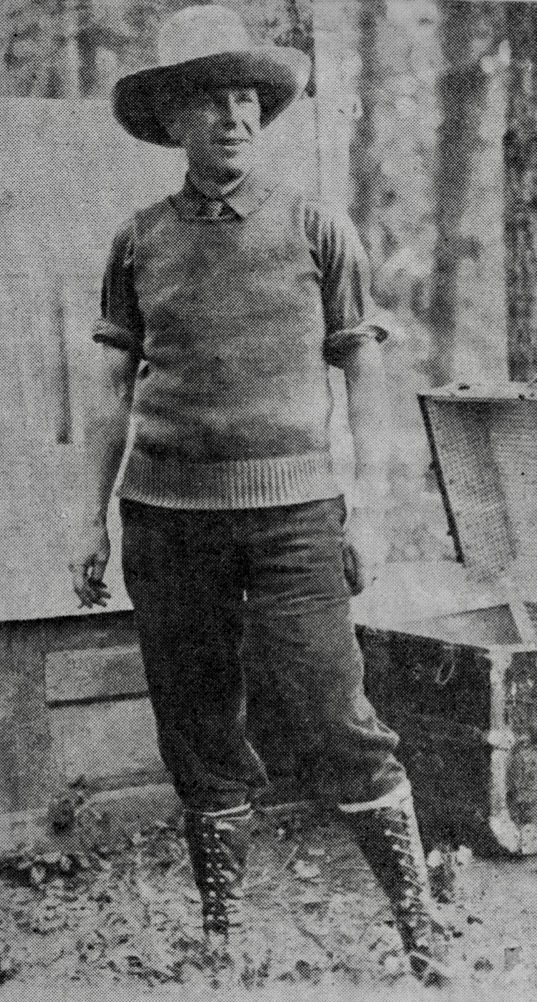
- Ira "Rem" Remsen at a rehearsal in the Forest Theater in the 1920s
- Born: Ira Mallory Remsen; May 11, 1876; Manhattan, New York City, New York
- Died: 29 November 1928 (aged 52); Carmel-by-the-Sea, California, US
- Occupations: Painter, playwright
- Spouses: Mary Hall Putnam (m. 1902; div. 1910) Helen Armstrong Yoder (m. 1922; div. 1926)

Signature
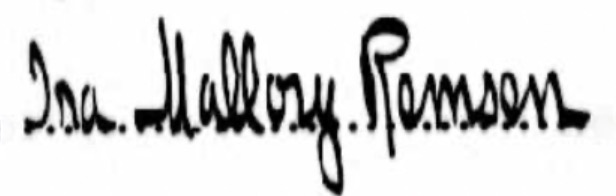

Ira Mallory Remsen (May 11, 1876 – November 29, 1928), known locally as Rem Remsen, was an American painter, playwright and Bohemian Club member. He was the son of Dr. Ira Remsen chemist and former president of Johns Hopkins University. Remsen was the author of children's plays notably Inchling and Mr. Blunt, he produced at the Forest Theater in Carmel-by-the-Sea, California in the 1920s. His studio on Dolores Street became the permanent home for the Carmel Art Association in 1933.

== Early life ==
Remsen was born on May 11, 1876, in Manhattan, New York City, New York. His father was Ira Remsen (1846-1927), and his mother was Elisabeth Hilleard Mallory (1854-). He was raised and educated in Baltimore, Maryland. At the age of 20, he went to Johns Hopkins University in 1895 and was in the class of Ninety-Seven.

In September 1898, he traveled to Paris, France. He studied art with Jean-Joseph Benjamin-Constant at the Académie Julian where he won an award for his paintings. He mastered portrait painting under Jacques Blanche and trained with painter Jean-Paul Laurens at the École des Beaux-Arts. He became a member of the American Art Association in Paris where he exhibited his portraits.

== Professional background ==
He married Mary Hall Putnam (1878-1905), prominent in New York society, on May 24, 1902, in Manhattan, New York City. They were divorced on April 1, 1910, on the allegation of "failure to provide and willful neglect".

While living in Greenwich Village, New York, Remsen stunted a fake marriage to Marie Centlivre, born of French parents in Indiana, on April 27, 1917. Centlivre was an actress in New York where they produced the play The Man Who Married an Ostrich.

=== Carmel-by-the-Sea ===
He married his second wife, Helen "Yodee" Armstrong Yoder on September 25, 1922 in Topeka, Kansas. She was a movie actress and society editor of the Topeka newspaper.

=== Inchling ===
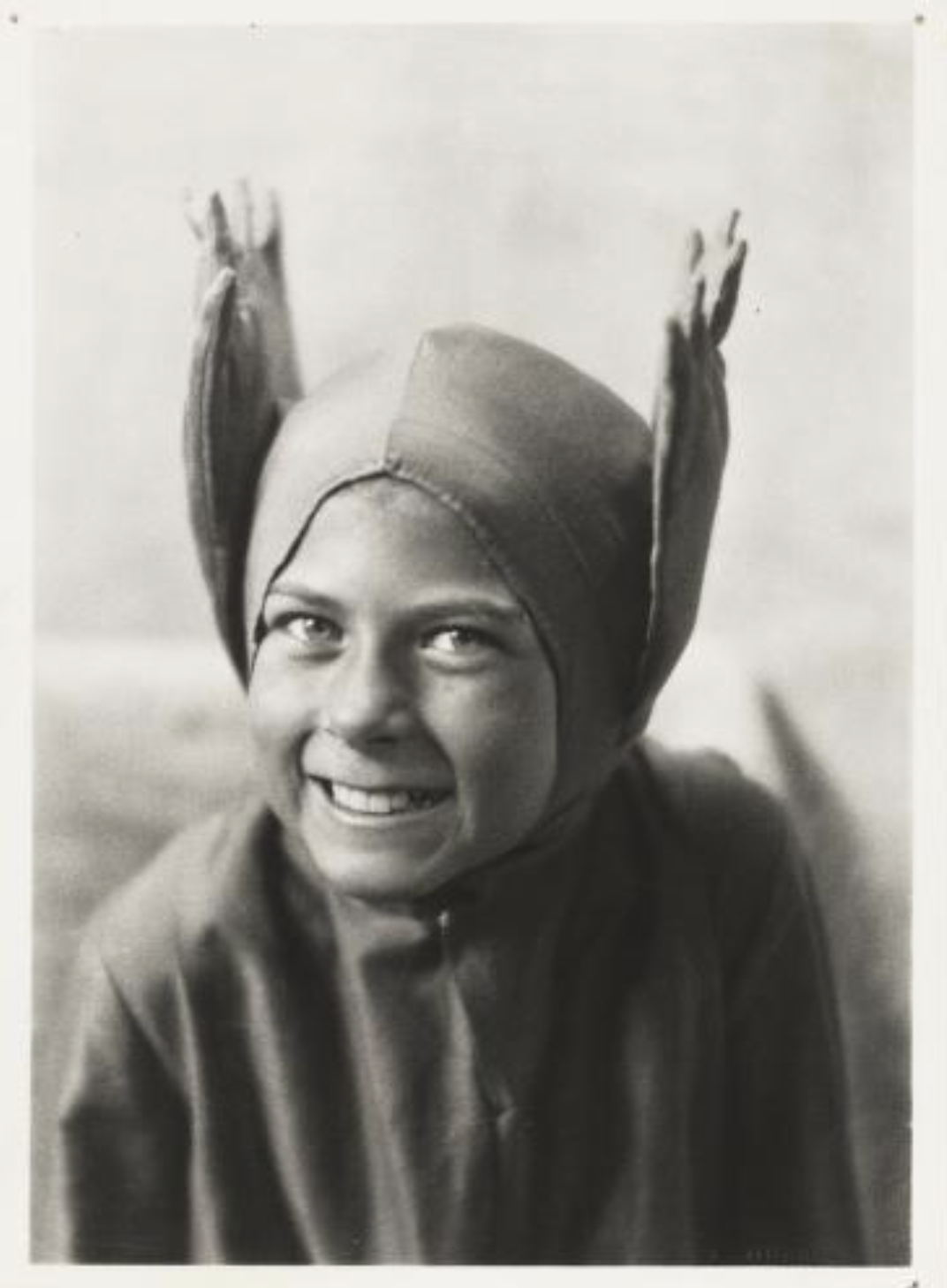
A child actor in the play Inchling.

Belle DeGraft, editor of the Monterey Daily Cypress gave this review: "Ira Mallory Remsen, author of the play, Inchling in the regular use of the word is not a play, but rather a fantasy. It is constructed out of a series of delightful little woodland scenes. It is something different from the conventional children's play, in which grown-ups usually play the leading parts. The scenery and customs, all designed by the author, are worthy of special mention."

On August 3, 1928, Remsen's play Inchling was presented at the Forest Theater for the second time under the direction of Garnet Holm. The play was rejected by New York producers after Remsen submitted the play for a theatrical release. The rejection threw him into a depression. He talked about George Sterling's death as a "glorious finish".

=== Mr. Bunt ===
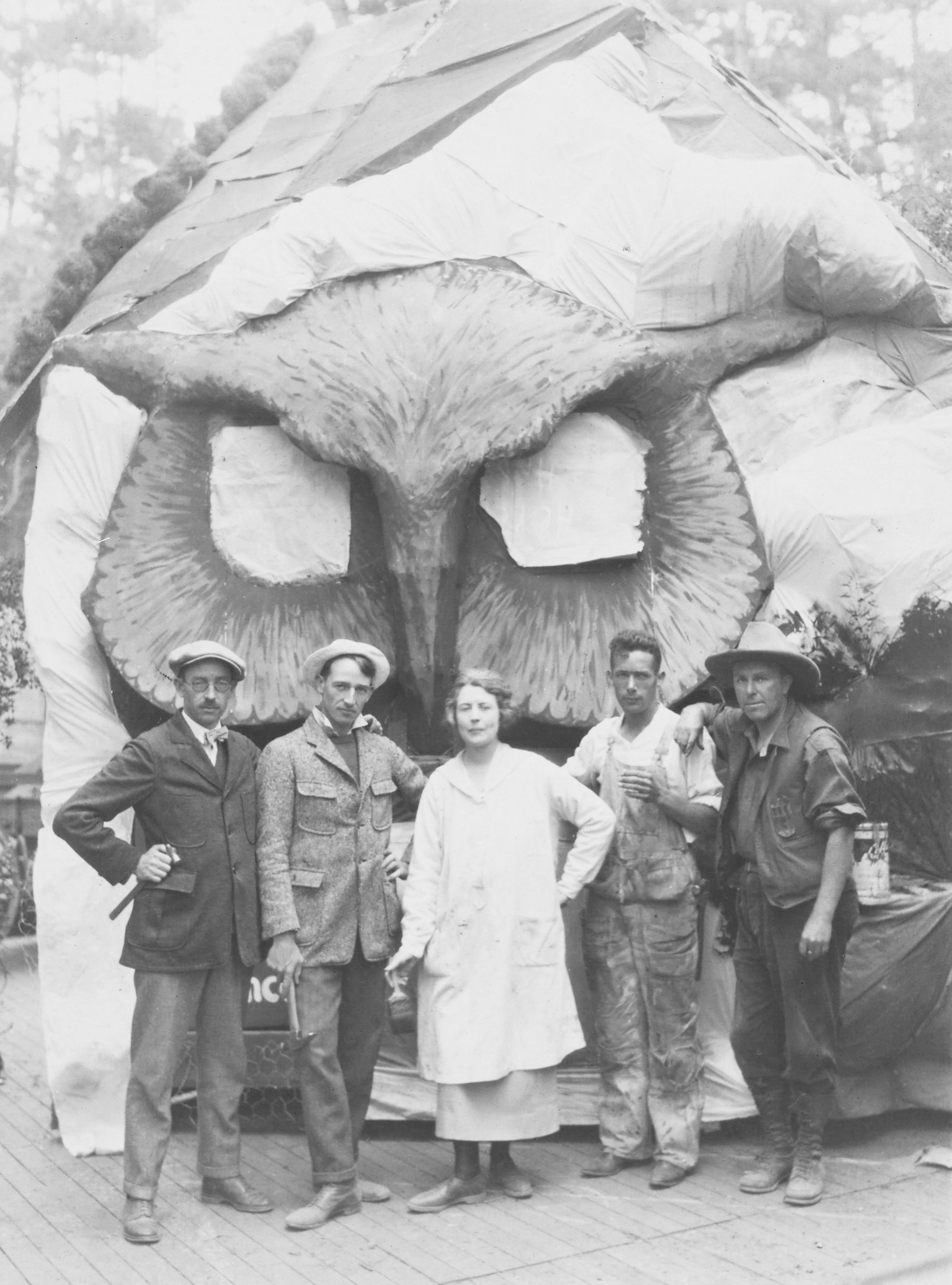
Set designers for the play Mr. Bunt at the Forest Theater (1924), left-to-right Talbert Josselyn, Winsor Josselyn, Brice Monahan, Philip Wilson, Rem Remsen.

On his return to Carmel in 1924, Remsen produced the four-act play Mr. Bunt at the Forest Theater from July 3 through 5th. It won the $100 (equivalent to $1,879 in 2025) award for the best original play submitted in the annual play contest held by the Forest Theater Society. The play was adapted for the outdoor amphitheater. The play had a fairy bridge, Gyem, the woodsprite, and included fairies, circus girls, Charles King Van Riper as the clown, and John Northern Hilliard as Danny.

Theatre Arts Monthly stated that Mr. Bunt is a play produced at the Forest Theater in Carmel. The title character, created by the character Annie while singing "Bye, Baby Bunting," is characterized as an "invisible playmate." The review noted that the author, Mr. Remsen, focuses on the concept of playmates and includes two child characters, while describing his treatment of the adult storylines as sentimental and romantic. The publication added that the play offers specific requirements for both the director and the actors.

=== Painting and other plays ===
In August 1925, Remsen went with painters Ray Strong, Ferdinand Burgdorff, and Frank Van Sloun for a two-month sketching trip to Grand Canyon and Flagstaff, Arizona. There he met printmaker Ernest Haskell and the landscape painter Jimmy Swinnerton. Strong wrote: "Ferdinand Burgdorff and Ira Remsen, the artists, have gone to Flagstaff after a month spent vegetating at the Grand Canyon and gathering up scenery on canvas. Mrs. Remsen paid them a short visit while they were at the canyon. She was horrified at the atrocious change the wild country had made in her eastwhile tame husband. His usually quite respectable face was sprouting a fierce growth of brush. He looked ferocious. His appearance would have done credit to a berserker at its worst. It was two days before the family dog quit growling at Ira and made friends again."

Remsen and his wife, Yodee, were divorced in April 1926 because of his "moodiness".

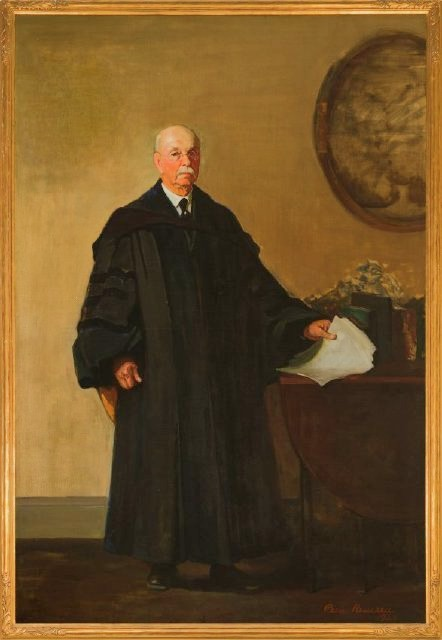
Portrait of Dr. Ira Remsen, painted by Ira Remsen Mallory in 1926.

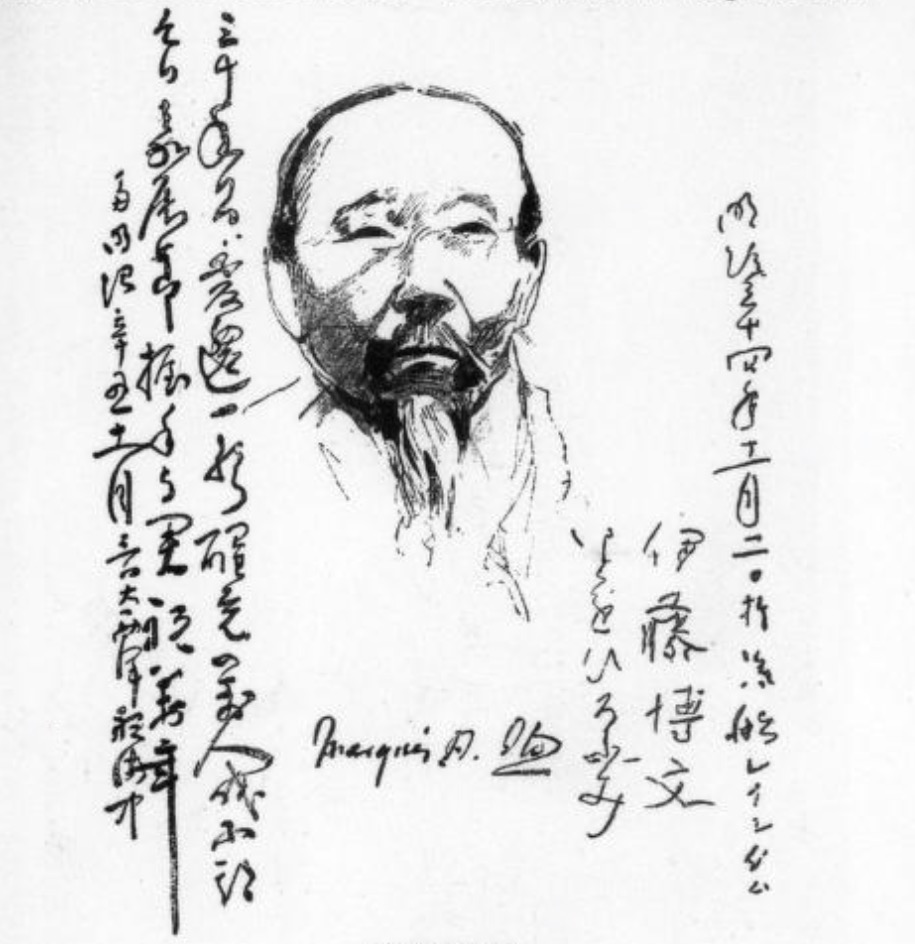
The Marquis Itō, sketched by Remsen in 1901.

He also did the drawings of Marquis Itō of Japan when he was on shipboard, and of sculptor and painter Frederick MacMonnies when he was in Paris in 1901.

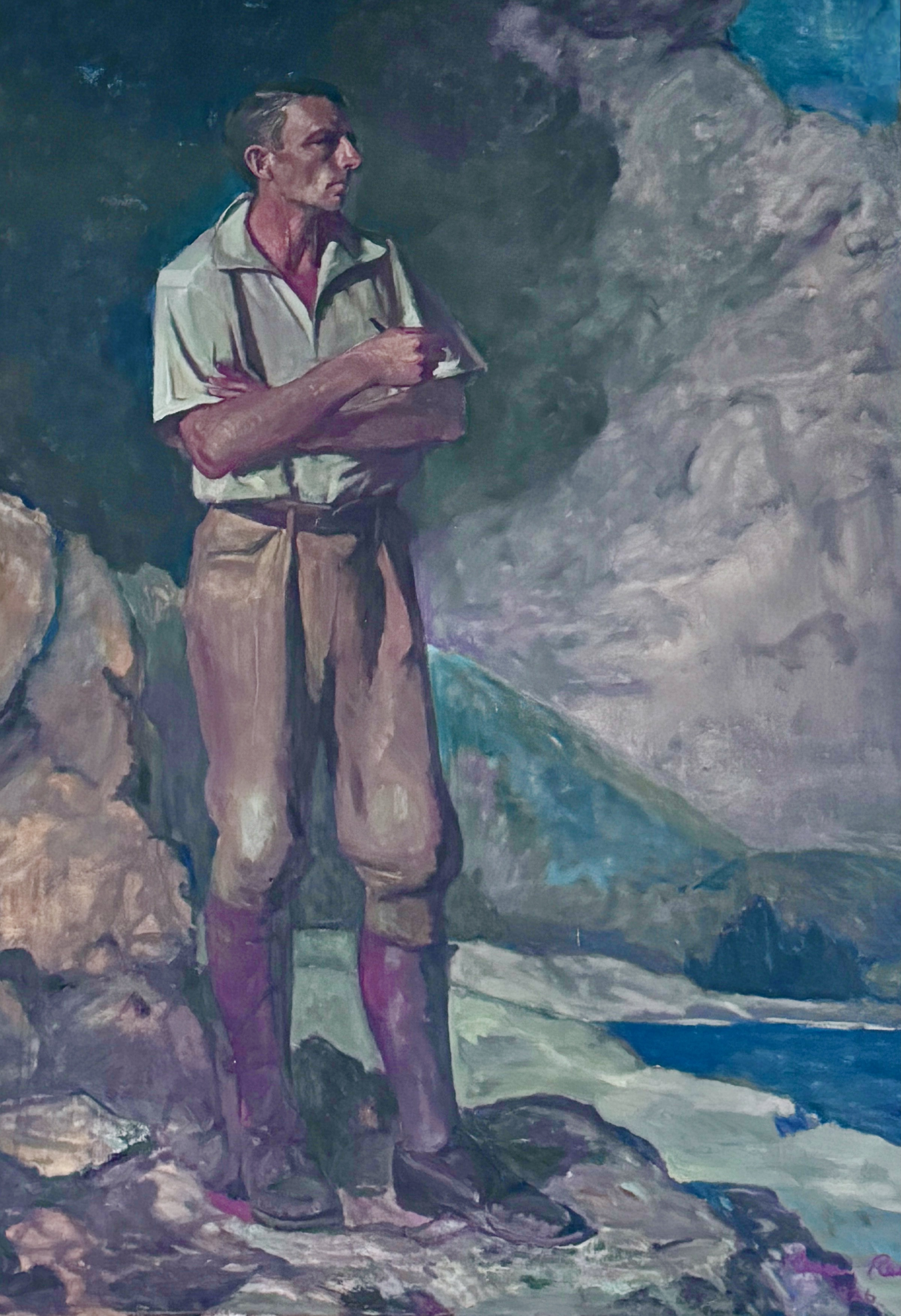
Portrait of Robinson Jeffers by Rem Remsen of Carmel, June 1926.

In June 1926 the painting of Robinson Jeffers was displayed in the Los Angeles Times and The Carmel Cymbal. In April 1946, the portrait was on display at the Carmel Art Association and then went as a gift to the Robinson Jeffers collection at the Occidental College library.

Remsen regularly attended the San Francisco Bohemian Club's summer camp at the Bohemian Grove along the Russian River where he helped produce plays for the "Jinks". He was the editor and founder of The Daily Grove News, which was published three weeks every summer for club members. It was posted daily on a bulletin board in the grove. It was filled with cartoons, poems, and jokes about the celebrities of the club.

Remsen's father died at Carmel's Pine Inn on March 4, 1927 and his ashes were sent to Johns Hopkins University.

On December 24, 1927, Remsen produced a Christmas fantasy The Tinsel Angel, with the three wise men and angels that sang Christmas carols. It was performed at his Dolores Street studio for the village children on Christmas Eve. His hospitality was well received. During Christmas week he sold several hundred copies of the play, illustrated with linoleum cuts by Robert W. Westwood, for $1 (equivalent to $19 in 2025) a copy.

In February 1928, Remsen displayed two paintings, Cathedral Rock and Hopi House-First Mesa-Arizona, at the First State-wide Annual in Santa Cruz, California. During the spring 1928, his watercolor Seagulls and Fishermen and several oils were exhibited at the Del Monte Hotel Gallery.

== Death ==
Remsen died by suicide on November 29, 1928, in his studio on Dolores Street in Carmel-by-the-Sea, California, at the age of 52. He left his personal effects to ex-wife, Helen Yoder Remsen, and his property worth $3,000 (equivalent to $63,512 in 2025) to his brother Dr. Charles M. Remsen of New York.

His body was shipped to New York to his mother and brother on December 2, 1928. Funeral services were held on December 7, 1928 at the Calvary Church Chapel in New York City with burial at the family plot at the Green-Wood Cemetery in Brooklyn, New York.

== Legacy ==
On July 8, 1929, Earl Raymond Woodward made a purchase from Remsen's estate for $6,000.

In November 1950, the Harrison Memorial Library held an exhibit honoring Remsen with a display of his published works including Mr. Bunt, Inchling, and The Tinsel Angel programs of performances given at the Forest Theater, and the three-sided stage set for the production of Mr. Bunt. Several items on display were contributed by the director Blanche Tolmie.

== See also ==
- Timeline of Carmel-by-the-Sea, California
