= Ferdinand Burgdorff =

American photographer (1881-1975)

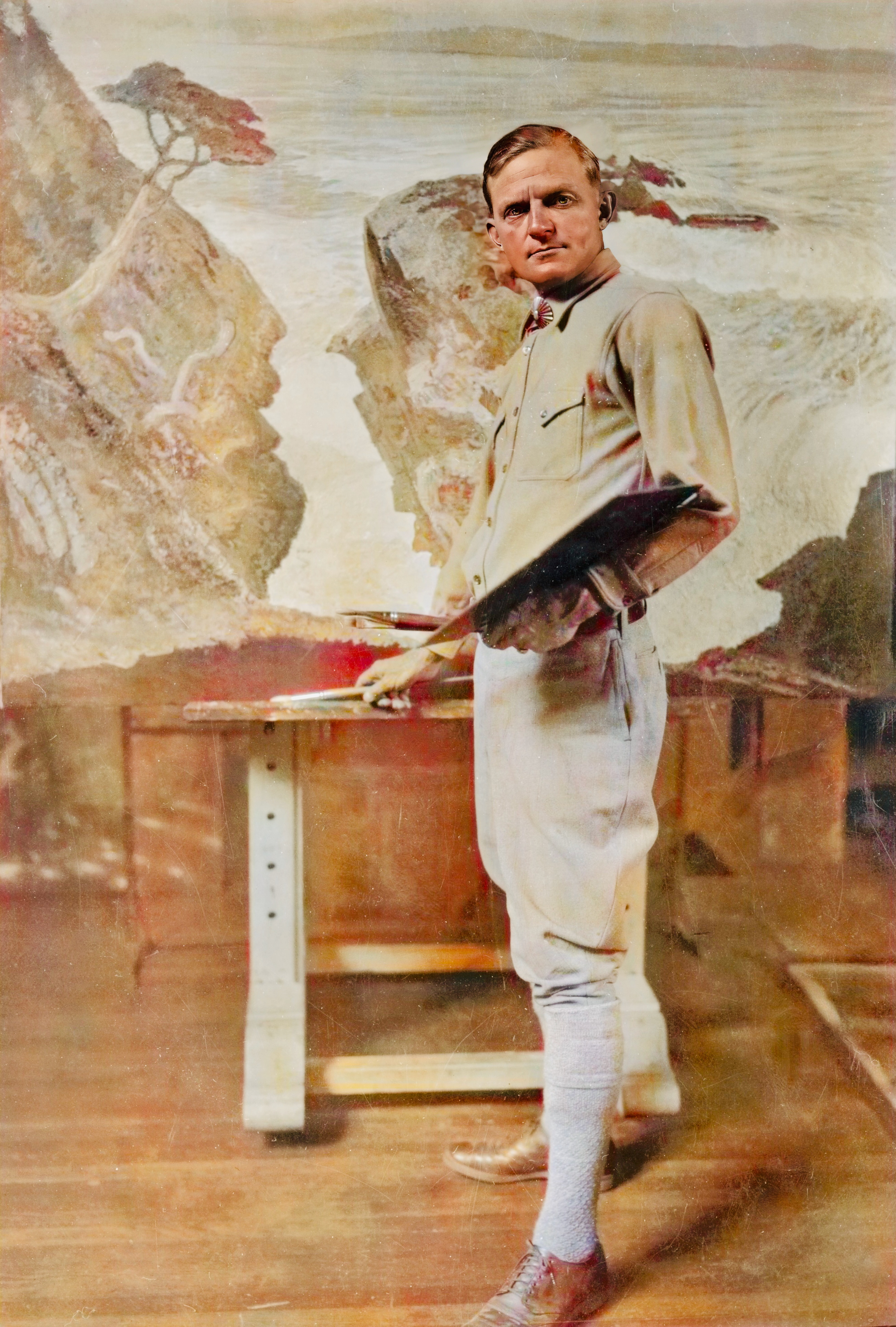
- Burgdorff (unknown date)
- Born: November 29, 1881; Cleveland, Ohio, US
- Died: May 12, 1975 (aged 93); Carmel-by-the-Sea, California, US
- Education: Cleveland School of Art
- Notable work: Dioramas of life zones at Yosemite Museum
- Style: realism

Signature
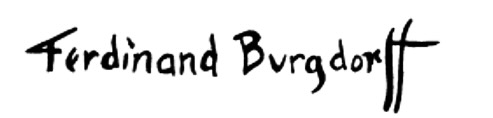

Ferdinand Burgdorff (November 29, 1881 – May 12, 1975) was a landscape painter, and printmaker whose subjects included the Monterey Peninsula, Yosemite, and the desert Southwest. He was an illustrator for Sunset Magazine. His works can be found in the permanent collections of the Naval Postgraduate School, De Young Museum, Monterey Museum of Art, and the Cleveland Museum of Art.

== Early life ==
Burgdorff was born on November 29, 1881, in Cleveland, Ohio. His father, Frederick Burgdorff, was a watchmaker from Hamburg, Germany, while his mother Ida Burgdorff, was of Prussian descent. He attended the Cleveland School of Art in Ohio. While in school, his interest was in all things related to art and nature, with a particular focus on Western American Art. He admired the work of painter Frederic Remington and the South Western landscapes by Fernand Lungren. Influenced by their work, he left Cleveland to explore the Southwest. He traveled and painted across Arizona and New Mexico.

Burgdorff underwent military training in Marin County for the U.S. Army during World War I. However, he never served on the active front lines. Throughout World War II, he donated numerous canvases to the USO, Red Cross nurses' quarters, and various hospitals.

== Career ==
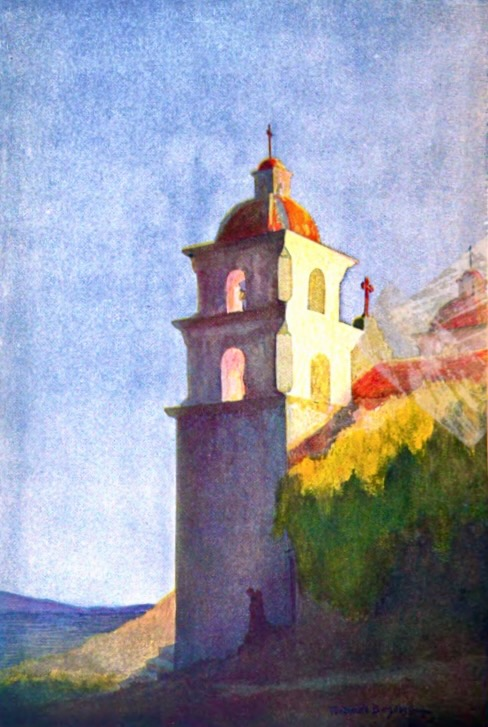
Bell Tower of Mission Santa Barbara, Santa Barbara, California (1908) by Burgdorff

He was one of the earliest artists that came to the art colony in Carmel-by-the-Sea.

Burgdorff worked as an illustrator for the newly established Sunset magazine. From 1908 to 1924, his designs were on the cover of what became a national magazine.

Between 1906 and 1908, Burgdorff traveled through Arizona, Europe, and California to paint. On March 14, 1909, Lucy B. Jerome, a critic from The San Francisco Call wrote a review of Burgdorff's art:

The work of Ferdinand Burgdorff, a young Cleveland painter, is compelling interest and attention from the local art world in a marked degree. Burgdorff is in his early twenties, but the three exquisitely toned water colors displayed at the exhibition of the Bohemian Club last week evince mature qualities. These three pictures were readily sold, and the 20 or more which the artist intends taking to Portland this week to place on exhibition give indications of rare talent.

Under the guidance of Charles S. Aiken, editor of Sunset magazine, Burgdorff exhibited forty to fifty canvases in Portland, Oregon. That August he exhibited at the Schussler Brothers Gallery of San Francisco. Lucy Jerome from The San Francisco Call stated: "six most fairylike and charming small paintings, three water colors and three oils. The one picturing Carmel bay on a starlight night is one of the most charming things seen in a long while."

Two months later, Burgdorff exhibited eight oils at the Vickery, Atkins & Torrey's Gallery in San Francisco. In November 1909, his artwork was exhibited at the Newton J. Tharp Memorial Exhibition (honoring Newton J. Tharp) at the California Club in San Francisco. In early 1910, Burgdorff presented two solo exhibitions in San Francisco galleries.

There is a fresco in the Herrmann Hall's Tower Room at the Naval Postgraduate School (the old Hotel Del Monte), called The Witch Tree. The tree is part of a small grove of native cypress trees that includes the Ghost Tree and the Lone Cypress. He did Cypress Through Fog in 1923, which is in the permanent collection at the Cleveland Museum of Art.

== Travels ==
In 1924, he painted Spanish Caravelle which is in the permanent collection at the De Young Museum.

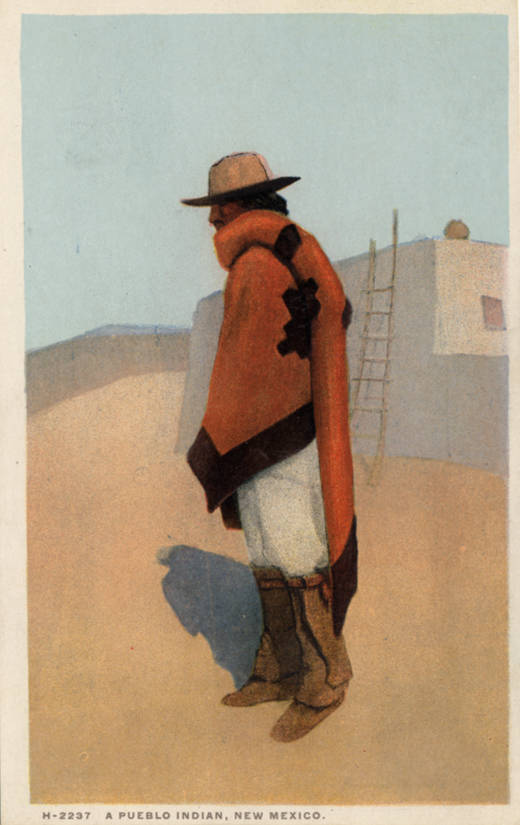
A Pueblo Indian, New Mexico (1900/1909) by Burgdorff

In 1907, Burgdorff traveled to Santa Fe, New Mexico, aspiring to specialize as a painter of desert landscapes over the more conventional aspen and adobe themes that were popular at the time. Burgdorff was commissioned by the Santa Fe Railroad company to make an oil painting of San Francisco Peaks in north central Arizona. He also painted near Albuquerque within the Sandia Mountains.

One of his first paintings was Pueblo Indian done in 1908.

In February 1910, The San Francisco Examiner reported Burgdorff's return from his outdoor ventures in the desert and seaside. He prepared to exhibit thirty new paintings from the Arizona's desert to the shores along Monterey Bay. The exhibition was slated for Vickery's gallery in San Francisco, scheduled from March 1 to March 15, 1910. The San Francisco Examiner said: "The canvases show much progress in technique since the picturesque artist first invaded the realism of Bohemia: but he has not abated in his daring color tones or in the broad sweep of his effects."

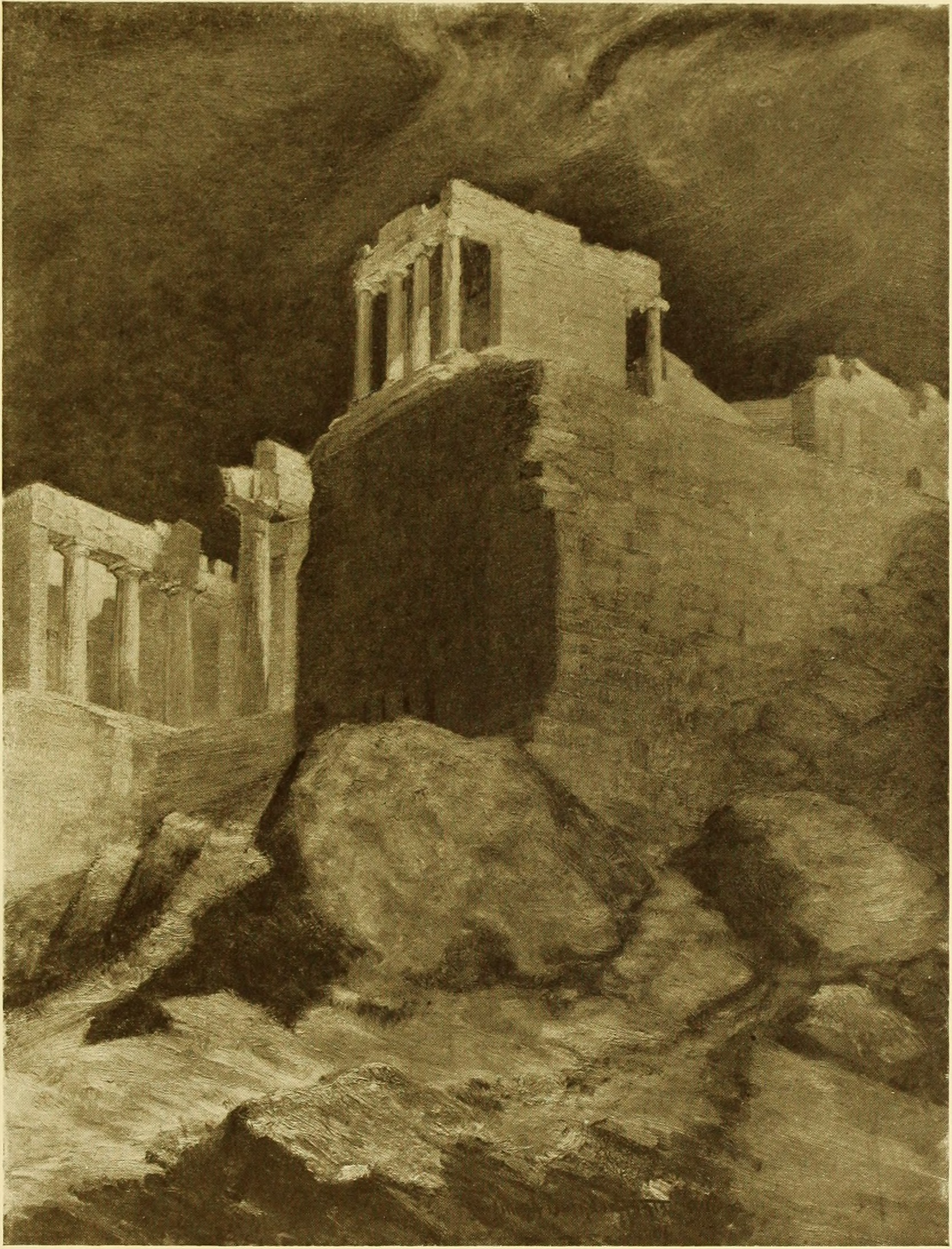
The Temple of Nike, from the Acropolis of Athens

By 1911, Burgdorff returned to Cleveland, for an exhibition of his desert-themed paintings. Following the show he traveled to several countries. In Paris, he studied under French painter Émile-René Ménard and American painter Florence Esté. His travels continued through Egypt and onward to Asia, spending six months in the Philippines before journeying through China and Japan on his homeward route. One of his main objectives was to see the ancient desert landscapes of Greece and Egypt.

In November 1913, while in Manila, his finances ran low and he took a job as a night watchman aboard the United States Army transport ship USAT Thomas to return to San Francisco.

In April 1914, Burgdorff exhibited his work in San Francisco; a review in The San Francisco Examiner stated

Greece, Italy, Egypt and California are the lands from which the artist has taken his scenes--These pictures are all new most of them being the product of a recent trip about the world--this present exhibition some of the finest work--and it is very fine at its best--are the pictures of Greece, especially The Temple of Nike.

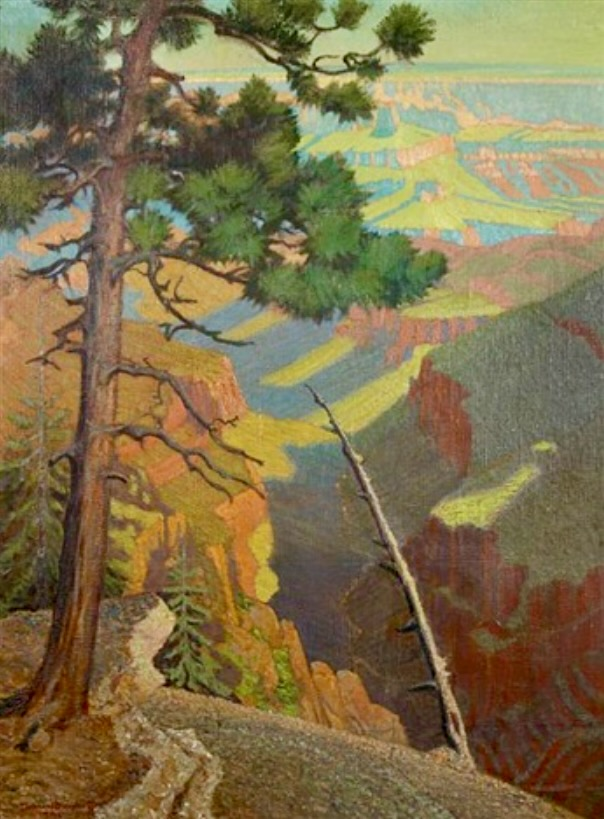
A view into the Grand Canyon (1926) by Burgdorff

Between 1907 and 1924, Burgdorff traveled to the Grand Canyon and the Hopi Reservation in Arizona. In 1924, accompanied by cartoonist Jimmy Swinnerton, he attended the snake dance at the Hopi Villages in Walpi and Oraibi. Subsequently, they resided at Grandview in the Grand Canyon for three months.

In August 1925, Burgdorff went with painters Ray Strong, Ira Remsen, and Frank Van Sloun for a two-month sketching trip to Grand Canyon, Kayenta and Flagstaff, Arizona. There they met printmaker Ernest Haskell and the landscape painter Jimmy Swinnerton.

Between 1917 and 1934, Burgdorff made several trips to Yosemite National Park. In 1934, he received a commission to paint the dioramas backgrounds illustrating six life zones at the Yosemite Museum. Collaborating with the museum's preparator's group in Berkeley, he worked under the guidance of Park Naturalist Ansel Hall.

In 1934, Jo Mora and Burgdorff shared quarters at San Francisco's Canterbury Hotel, and spent seven months designing and painting the lobby panels to illustrate themes from Chaucer's The Canterbury Tales.

== Death ==
Burgdorff continued to paint until his death on May 12, 1975, at the age of 94.
