= Ernest Schweninger =

American businessman

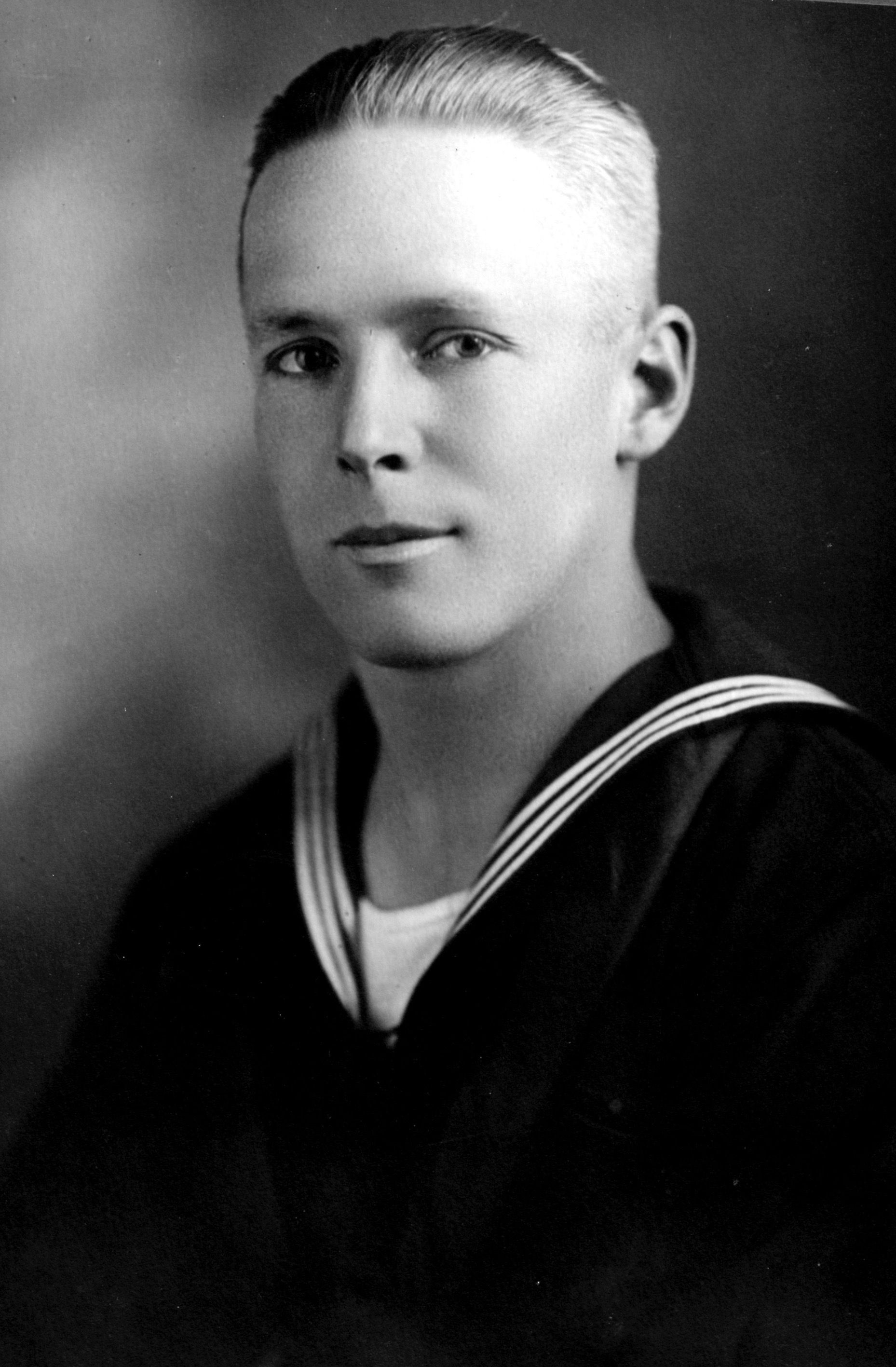
- Ernest Schweninger; United States Navy (1918)
- Born: Ernest Seraphin Schweninger; September 9, 1892; San Jose, California, US
- Died: 11 November 1957 (aged 65); Carmel-by-the-Sea, California, US
- Occupations: Grocer, actor
- Spouse: Carol Walker

Ernest Seraphin Schweninger (September 9, 1892 – November 11, 1957) was an American actor, realtor, and grocer in Carmel-by-the-Sea, California. He became owner of Carmel's first Bakery and the Schweninger's Grocery Store. Schweninger was a founding member of the Carmel American Legion Post No. 512 and the Abalone League. He appeared in many of the early plays at the Forest Theater and Theatre of the Golden Bough. He became a partner and sales manager for the Carmel Land Company that helped develop Hatton Fields, southeast of Carmel-by-the-Sea.

== Early life ==
Schweninger was born on September 9, 1892, in San Jose, California. His father was Fritz Seraphin Schweninger who was born in Germany and immigrated to San Francisco in 1886; and mother was Helen M. Harmon from Maine. He had one brother, George Washington Schweninger.

In 1899 his parents moved from San Jose to Carmel to open the first Carmel Bakery on the south side of Ocean Avenue. Schweninger was an eighth grade graduate in the Monterey School on June 30, 1906. He was the first boy from Carmel to attend the Monterey High School. During his high school commencement exercises, he appeared in the senior play, She Stoops to Conquer.

Schweninger went to the University of California, Berkeley. He was a member of the Sigma Phi Epsilon fraternity at Berkeley and graduated as a senior in the class of 1914.

== Career ==
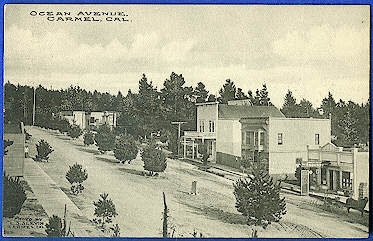
Louis Slevin's merchandise store, Schweninger's Carmel Bakery, and the Carmel Grocery Store.

In 1915, Schweninger's parents acquired two lots adjacent to the Carmel Bakery, on Ocean Avenue, and opened the Carmel Grocery store. He worked in the grocery store and offered free auto deliveries. On August 2, 1916, Schweninger voted in the petition to incorporate the city of Carmel-by-the-Sea. The Carmel Bakery was successful, but in September 1917, the Schweningers announced they would close the business to spend more time with the grocery business. The bakery sat vacant throughout 1918-1919.

On May 1, 1918, during World War I, Schweninger was recruited at the Fort McDowell on Angle Island in San Francisco and was stationed with the United States Navy at Mare Island. While serving in the Navy, both his parents died in an automobile accident. Because Ernest was away serving in the war, his brother George was appointed administrator of the estate of his parents by the Superior Court. The estate was valued at $20,000 (equivalent to $428,097 in 2025). After the war, in January 1919, Schweninger was relieved from active duty and returned home and took over running the grocery store.

In 1920, he reopened the Carmel Bakery leasing the building to Carl Husemann. The building was leased to several other people who ran the bakery.

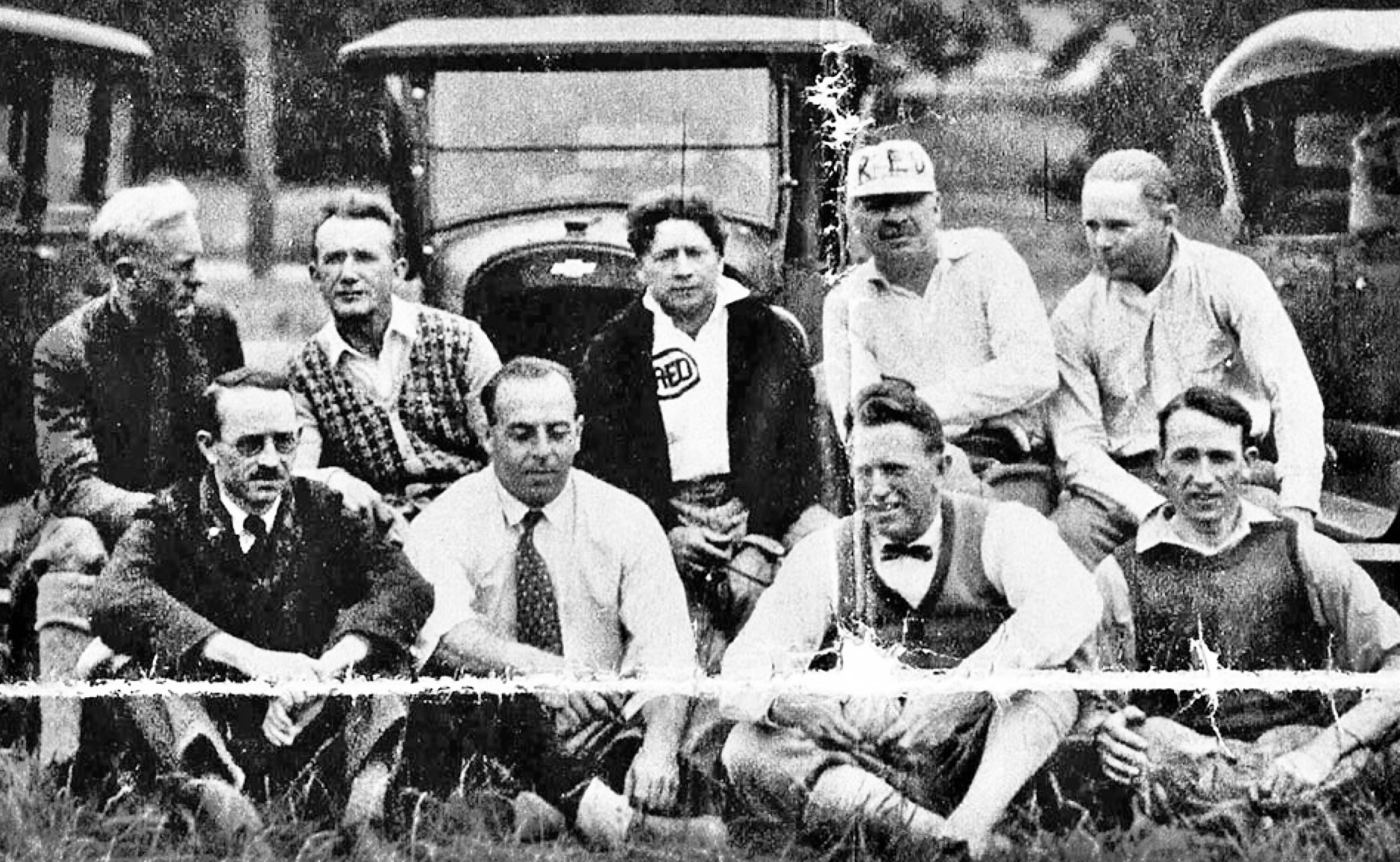
Abalone League players (lr) Fred Bechdolt, Edward Kuster, James Hopper, John Hillaiard, Ernest Schweninger, Front: Talbert Josselyn, C.K. Van Ripper, R.C. Smith, Winsor Josselyn.

In 1921, Schweninger helped launch the Abalone League an amateur baseball and softball club.

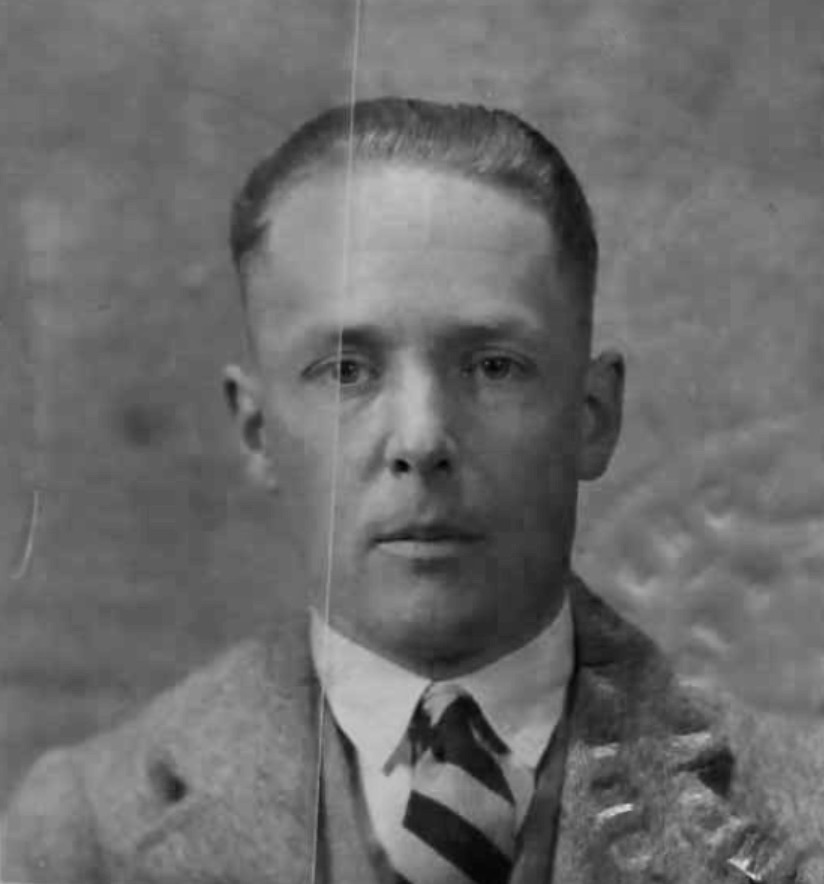
Ernest Schweninger's passport photo

In 1923, the Schweninger brothers sold the grocery store business to Benjamin F. Minges of Monterey. Schweninger applied for a US Passport for his travels to the South Seas on May 21, 1923. He traveled with his close friends, writers Harry Leon Wilson and his wife Helen and Charles King Van Riper and his wife Helen.They visited New Zealand, Society Islands, Australia, and Tahiti on board the SS Maunganui.They also visited Japan after the 1923 Great Kantō earthquake.

Schweninger was a founder and charter member of the Carmel American Legion Post No. 512 in 1934. It was a veterans' organization and historic meeting hall located at the corner of Dolores Street and 8th Avenue.

On July 5, 1949, Schweninger, married Carol Walker (1899-1989) in Reno, Nevada. She had two sons from a previous marriage.

=== Acting ===
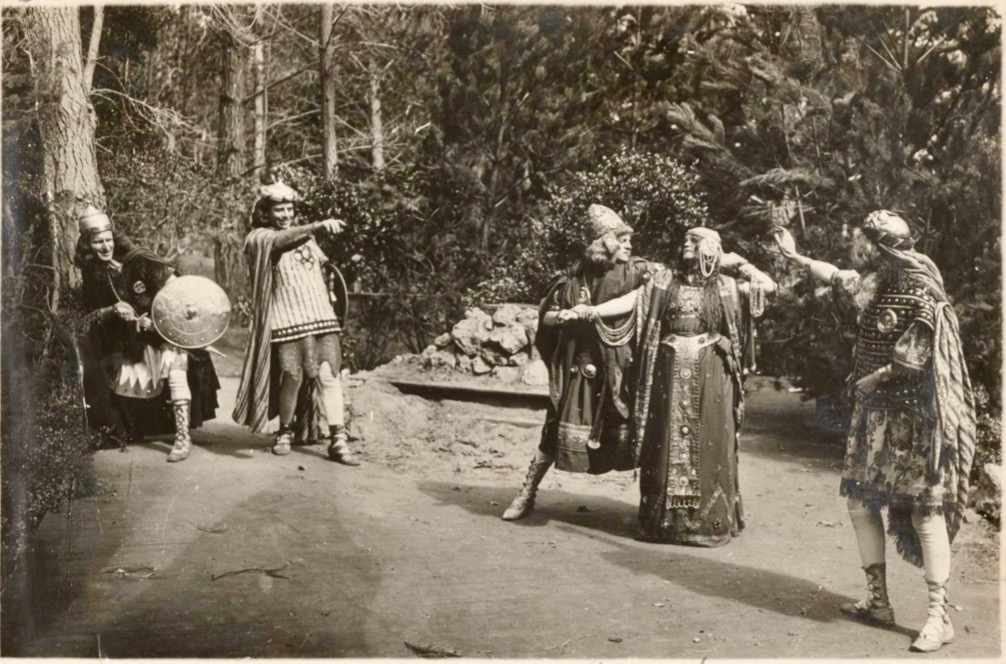
David by Constance Skinner, July 9, 1910

Schweninger appeared in many of the early Forest Theater and Theatre of the Golden Bough plays. He and his brother George appeared in the first theatrical production of David, written by Constance Lindsay Skinner under the direction of Garnet Holme of Berkeley, at the Forest Theater on July 9, 1910. The play was reviewed in both Los Angeles and San Francisco and was reported that nearly 1,000 theatergoers attended the production.

Schweninger acted in plays with Herbert Heron at the Forest Theater. He was in Heron's comedy play Immortal Fame on February 26, 1915, sponsored by the Carmel Arts and Crafts Club. In 1917, he acted in two summer plays, Androcles and the Lion, where he played the Captain, and A Thousand Years Ago by Percy MacKaye, where he played Calaf, Prince of Astrakhan.

=== Carmel Land Company ===
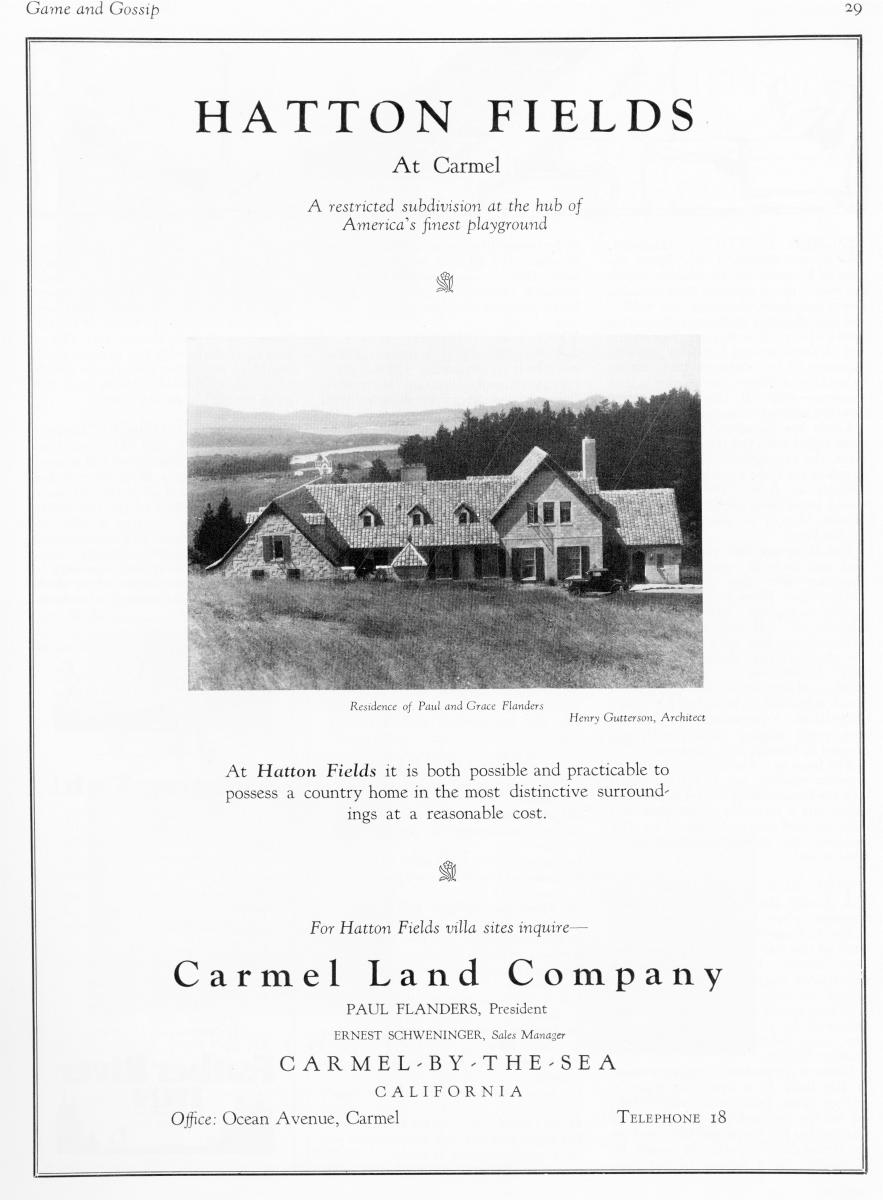
Carmel Land Company Advertisement

In 1925, Schweninger became the sales manager for the Carmel Land Company and helped develop Hatton Fields, southeast of Carmel-by-the-Sea. Schweninger was secretary of the company.

== Death and legacy ==
Schweninger died of a heart attack at his home in Carmel-by-the-Sea, on November 11, 1957. Funeral services were held in the Little Chapel-by-the-Sea and interment was at the El Carmelo Cemetery, in Pacific Grove, California.

His legacy survives today through the Carmel Bakery, the American Legion Post 512, Hatton Fields, and the Forest Theater.

== List of plays ==
- She Stoops to Conquer (1908)
- David (1910)
- Burn It (1913)
- Pamela Pitkin, Playwright (1915)
- Immortal Fame (1916)
- The Gift (1916)
- The Wonder Hat (1916)
- Androcles and the Lion (1917)
- A Thousand Years Ago (1917)
- A Night Off (1918)
- The Private Secretary (1919)
- The Rented Ranch (1923)
- Carmel Follies (1924)
- The Bad Man (1926)
- The Old Lady Who Lived Alone (1926)
- Uncle Tom's Cabin (1927)

== See also ==
- Timeline of Carmel-by-the-Sea, California
