= Kotaro Shimomura =

Japanese chemical engineer

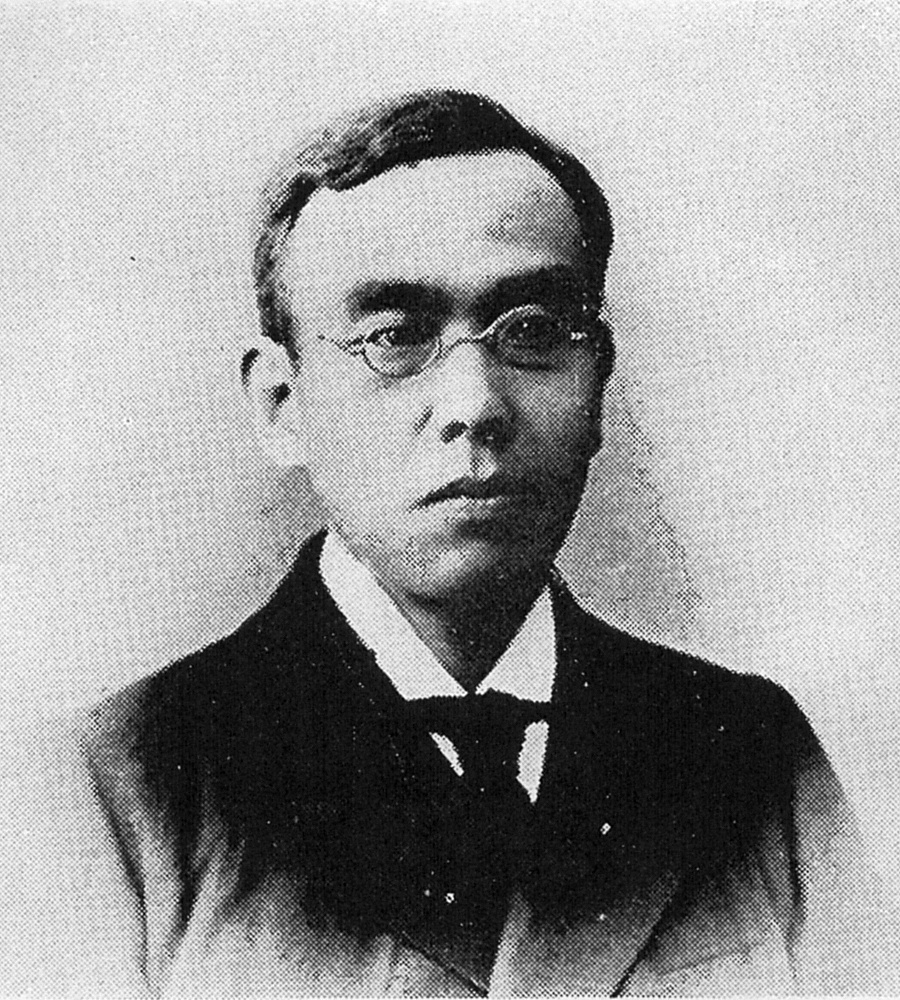
Portrait of Kotaro Shimomura

Kotaro Shimomura (下村 孝太郎, Shimomura Kōtarō; October 29, 1861 – October 21, 1937) was a Japanese chemical engineer known for many famous inventions. He coined the term for chemical engineering, kagaku-kōgaku (化学工学), in Japanese in 1909.

== Early life and education ==
Shimomura was born in Kumamoto, the eldest son in a samurai family, shortly before the Meiji Restoration. When about 12 years of age, he attended the Kumamoto Yogakko where American soldier Capt. L. L. James was engaged. In 1876, he was studying theology in Doshisha. He went to America in 1885 when 25 years of age, and he entered the Worcester Polytechnic Institute. He took the degree of B.S. He went to Johns Hopkins University where he worked in organic chemistry under Prof. Ira Remsen. He also obtained practical technique of Solvay in Bruxelles.

== Career ==
=== Coke-oven and Coke manufacture ===
Dr. Shimomura was the first to produce coke on a large scale in quality and hardness equal to best English and German coke by suitable blending of materials and suitable method of heating, which eventually superseded the foreign articles entire

He erected the first by-product ovens in Japan, and when built and started, the enterprise was considered to be a reckless endeavor. But gradually the number of ovens has increased and there were more than a thousand coke-ovens of by-product type. This method of blending was adopted by all the subsequent manufacturers.

=== Ammonium sulphate, naphthalene and benzene ===
Shimomura was one of the earliest workers on ammonium sulphate to produce it on a large scale and put it on the market as a fertilizer in the days when its superiority to sodium nitrate in Japanese soils was not very well recognized. He was not an expert in tar distillation and was among the first to produce naphthalene in powder, balls and cakes at a time when its smell was objected to as something unbearable.

He was the first to put up a plant to extract benzene from coke-oven gas, when it was thought that it would not sell. This fear was subsequently contradicted by increased demand for benzene as solvent, motor oil and also an important raw material for dyestuffs. In the time of the world war, Japan was amply provided with benzene obtained from coke-oven gas to make the manufacture of dyestuffs independent of foreign supply.

=== Gas industry ===
When Dr. Shimomura became connected with Osaka Gas Company, it was producing to supply about 700,000 c. ft. per day of gas. As a director, he was responsible for the extensions up to the several millions c. ft. a day. With the Osaka Seimi Works Company a similar growth took place and he was responsible for the works development from one battery to three batteries, from 16 to 73 ovens, from 600 tons of coke to 6000 tons per month.

In the year 1909 he determined to devote the surplus gas of the by-product ovens of the Seimi Works of two companies, the Osaka Gas and the Seimi, and by means of a compressor which had been used for riveting a gas-holder, about 200,00 c. ft. were sent out daily under high pressure. This is regarded as the first attempt in Japan to use the high-pressure conveyance, the method since then becoming so prevalent in this country,

=== Wood preserving industry ===
The importance of subjecting railway sleepers to some preserving process was insisted on by Dr. Shiga, and a company was formed to use creosote oil mixed with Zinc compound; but owing to the lack of tar oil, the enterprise was in a precarious condition, when Dr. Shimomura was enabled to put a large quantity of creosote oil to its use, resulting in the formation of the Toyo Wood Preserving Company. The wood preserving business has steadily developed.

=== Dyestuff manufacture ===
In his travels abroad, besides investigating coke-ovens, he took every opportunity to get a glimpse of the dyestuffs works and was favored with rare chances of inspecting inside of some works in England. When the world war broke out, he was found to be one of the very few among native chemists who had given any attention to the preparation of dyestuffs and was asked to take the position of the managing chief chemist to start the works of company, - the Japan Dyestuff Manufacturing Company. In view of the extraordinary circumstances, he consented to do so in spite of the impaired eyesight under which he was suffering. Thus was inaugurated the manufacturing of the dyestuffs on a large scale, one of the most ambitious projects that Japan had ever undertaken in competition with the West.

=== Doshisha University ===
Shimomura was the organizer of the Harris School of Science at Doshisha University in Kyoto and served as professor of chemistry from 1889 to 1896. He was also a trustee of the college and was twice elected as honorary president.

== Positions held ==
Doshisha University:

The sixth honorary president of Doshisha University (1904 - 1907)

Osaka Seimi Works Company (amalgamation with the Osaka Gas Company):

Chief Engineer (1899-1907)
Managing Director and Chief Engineer (1905-1923)
President (1923)

Osaka Gas Company:

Consulting Engineer (1905-1907)
Chief Engineer (1907-1916)
Director (1919)
Managing Director (1926-1928)

Toyo (Oriental) Wood Preserving Company:

Technical Adviser (1907-1918)
Director (1918)
Chairman of the Board of Directors(1924)

Kobe Gas Company:

Technical Advisor (1910)

Japan Dyestuff Manufacturing Company (amalgamation with the Sumitomo Chemical):

Managing Chief Chemist (1916-1918)
Technical Advisor (1918)
