= Ebenezer Emmet Reid =

American chemist

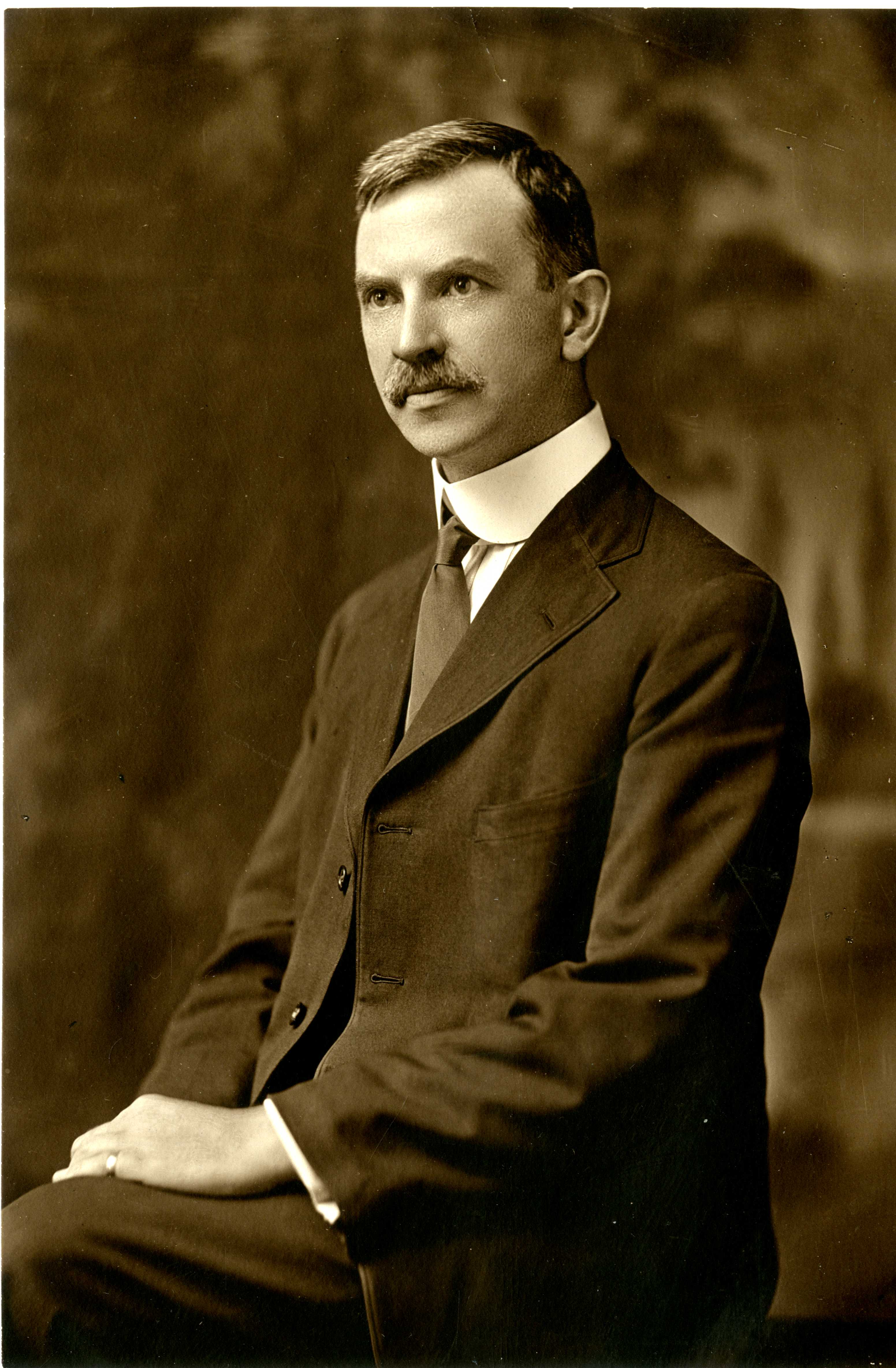
Reid c. 1915, Johns Hopkins University archives

Ebenezer Emmet Reid (June 27, 1872 – December 21, 1973) was an American chemist and a professor at Johns Hopkins University. During World War I he worked on chemical warfare, particularly teargas. His specialization was on organic sulfur chemistry.

== Life and work ==
Reid was born in Fincastle, Virginia, and studied chemistry at Johns Hopkins University. He received a doctorate for work on kinetics of the hydrolysis of acid amides under Ira Remsen in 1898. He became a teacher of chemistry in 1908 and worked until 1936. During World War I he was involved in research on chemical warfare agents at the American University Experimental Station. He was involved in creating tear gas. He specialized in organic sulfur compounds. He identified the mechanism of ester hydrolysis in 1910, based on his studies on thioesters and thiols, noting that it involves the fission of acyl-oxygen. He wrote an autobiography at the age of 100 that he called "My First One Hundred Years". He travelled to research departments by bus four times a year encouraging and advising researchers.

Even after his retirement, with failing eyesight and arthritis, he published 140 articles. He learned Braille, typing by touch and had students read material for him. He served as an industrial and government consultant at least until 1950. In 1961 he produced a second edition of his 1924 book Invitation to Chemical Research adding a Spanish translation as well.

He and his wife Margaret had a daughter and two sons. His wife predeceased him in 1967. Johns Hopkins University established the E. Emmet Reid Chair in chemistry in his honor.

== Selected publications ==
- Hydrolysis of acid amides. Easton, Pennsylvania: The Chemical Publishing Company. 1899. LCCN agr16000550.
- Chemistry in high schools. 1905. LCCN tmp81041374.
- Catalysis in organic chemistry. New York: D. Van Nostrand Company. 1922. LCCN 22024033; French original by Paul Sabatier, translated by E. Emmet Reid
- Introduction to organic research. New York: D. Van Nostrand Company. 1924. LCCN 24028865.
- College organic chemistry. New York: D. Van Nostrand Company. 1929. LCCN 29024073.
- Organic chemistry of bivalent sulfur. New York: Chemical Publishing Company. 1958. LCCN 58004662.
- Invitation to chemical research. Palisade, New Jersey: Franklin Publishing Company. 1961. LCCN 61019758.
- Chemistry through the language barrier; how to scan chemical articles in foreign languages with emphasis on Russian and Japanese. Baltimore: Johns Hopkins Press. 1970. LCCN 75112360.

== Other sources ==
- Reid, Ebenezer Emmet (1972). My First One Hundred Years. Chemical Publishing Company.
