= John Northern Hilliard =

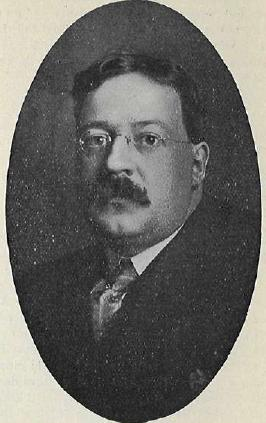
- John Northern Hilliard (1909)
- Born: John Northern Hilliard; August 18, 1872; Palmyra, New York, US
- Died: March 14, 1935 (aged 62); Indianapolis, Indiana, US
- Resting place: Mont Hope Cemetery, Rochester, New York
- Notable work: Greater Magic
- Spouse: Ida Louise Harrison
- Children: 3

John Northern Hilliard (August 18, 1872 – March 14, 1935) was an American newspaperman, poet, novelist, and playwright. Among his works is a best-selling book on magic, Greater Magic.

== Biography ==
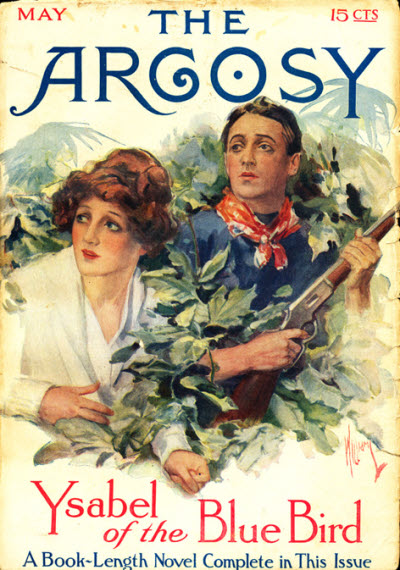
Hilliard's "Ysabel of the Blue Bird" was the cover story in the May 1913 issue of The Argosy

John Northern Hilliard was born in Palmyra, New York, in 1872. His parents were Allen D. Hilliard (1829–1888) and Augusta B Bartells (1839–1902). His wife was Ida Louise Harrison. They had three children.

Through Eugene Field he obtained his first job as a reporter on the Chicago Press at the age of 17. He covered the Chicago World's Fair in 1893, the surrender of Sitting Bull, and the bloody Johnson County War in Wyoming. On December 17, 1896, he was a dramatic critic for a Rochester newspaper. He was the last person to see magician Alexander Herrmann (also known as "Herrmann the Great") alive before his death on board a train heading to Bradford, Pennsylvania.

Hilliard was a close friend, from the early 1890s at the New York World, with American poet, novelist, and short story writer, Stephen Crane, who wrote The Red Badge of Courage. Hilliard had letters written by Crane, one of which contained incidents in the life of the author.

In the 1920s, Hilliard was living in Carmel-by-the-Sea, California. Mary E. Hand, president of the Carmel Arts and Crafts Club, helped build the Carmel Arts and Crafts Theater in 1922, where the Club put on their own theatrical productions. The formal opening of the theater was highlighted by the performance of two plays produced and directed by Hilliard, The Thrice Promised Bride and The Queen's Enemies. In 1924, Hilliard was an actor in Ira Remsen's children's fantasy Mr. Bunt, where he played the role of Danny, a circus clown. He left Carmel for New York in 1925. He wrote several books of verse, plays, and stories. One of his poems include Underneath the Bough and musical comedy, The Castaways.

After moving to the New York Telegram he met magician Howard Thurston and became interested in magic himself. In 1925 he joined Thurston's magic show as an advance man and for the next 10 years toured America, meeting the most talented magicians of his day and recording their creations. He "edited" T. Nelson Downs's book The Art of Magic; he is generally considered to be its author.

== Death ==
Hilliard died of a heart attack on March 14, 1935, while in a hotel room in Indianapolis, Indiana.

After his sudden death in 1935, his book, Greater Magic, was finished by Jean Hugard and published by Carl Waring Jones in 1938.
