= Ira Remsen =

American chemist (1846–1927)

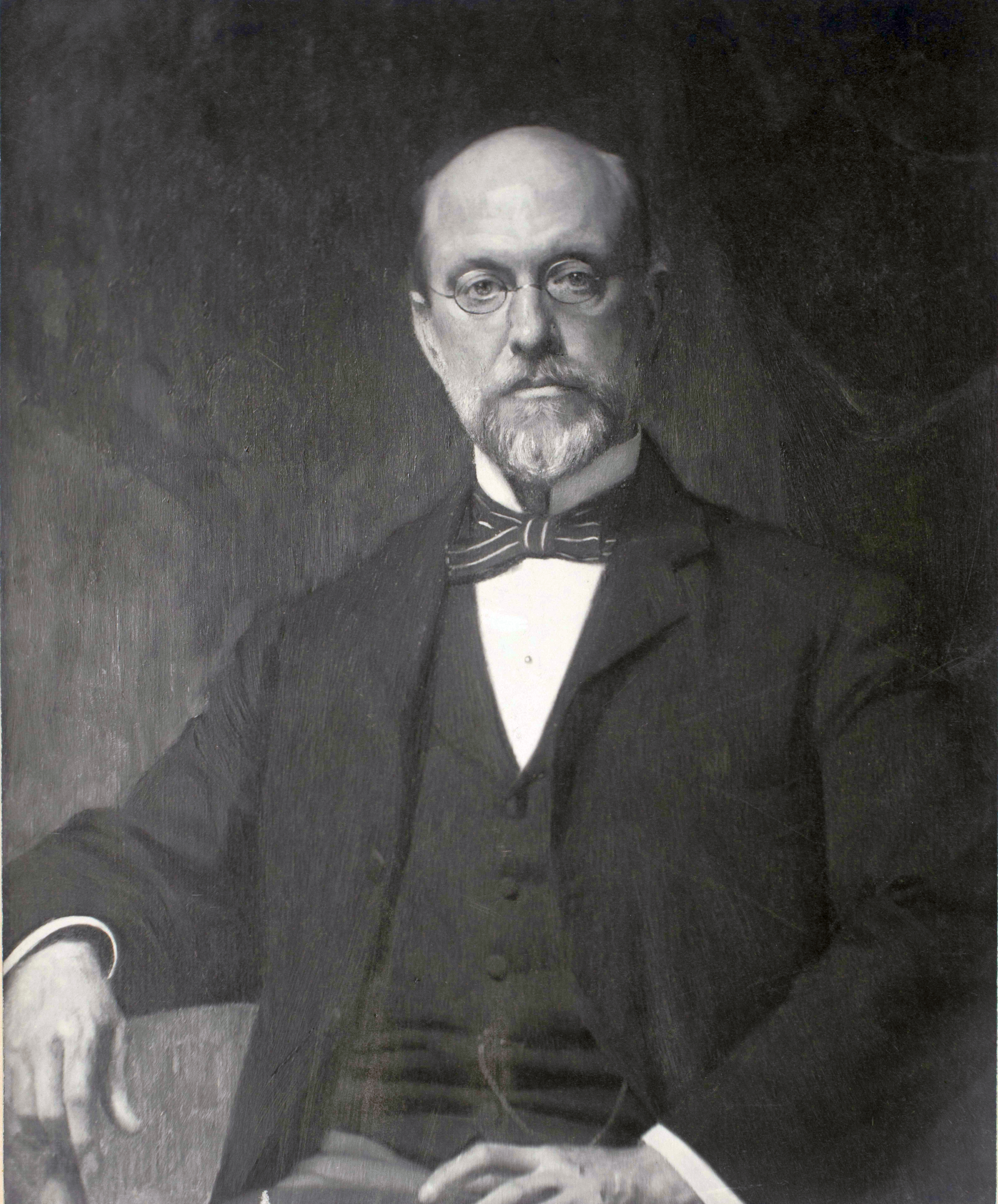
- Portrait painting, 1906
- Born: February 10, 1846; New York City, New York, U.S.
- Died: March 4, 1927 (aged 81); Carmel-by-the-Sea, California, U.S.
- Education: Columbia University; University of Göttingen
- Known for: Discovery of saccharin Founder, American Chemical Journal
- Spouse: Elisabeth Hilleard Mallory
- Awards: Priestley Medal (1923); Willard Gibbs Award (1914)
- Scientific career
- Fields: Chemistry
- Workplaces: University of Tübingen; Williams College; Johns Hopkins University
- Doctoral advisor: Wilhelm Rudolph Fittig
- Doctoral students: William Henry Emerson; Charles Herty; William A. Noyes; Kotaro Shimomura; Ebenezer Emmet Reid; Homer W. Hillyer

Ira Remsen (10 February 1846 – 4 March 1927) was an American chemist who introduced organic chemistry research and education in the United States along the lines of German universities where he received his early training. He was the first professor of chemistry and the second president of Johns Hopkins University. He founded the American Chemical Journal, which he edited from 1879 to 1914. The discovery of saccharin was made in his laboratory by Constantine Fahlberg who worked in collaboration with Remsen but patented the synthesis on his own, earning the ire of Remsen.

== Early life ==
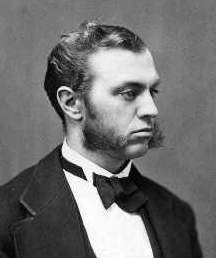
Shortly after returning from Germany, c. 1897

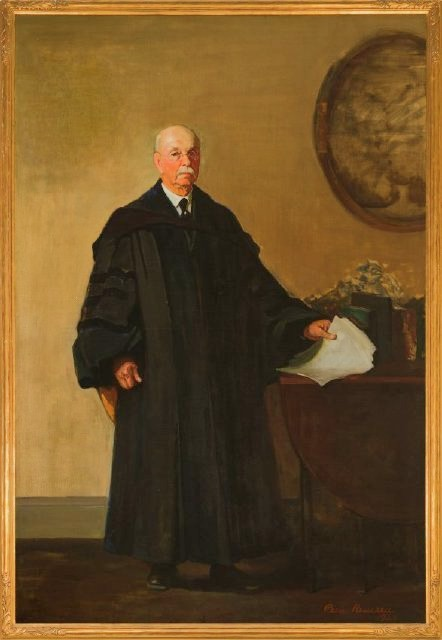
Portrait of Dr. Ira Remsen, painted by Ira Mallory Remsen in 1926.

Ira Remsen was born in New York City on February 10, 1846. He was the son of James Vanderbelt Remsen (1818–1892) and Rosanna née Secor (1823–1856) who came from family of Dutch settlers. His mother had Huguenot ancestors. He went to the New York Free Academy where he studied Greek, Latin, maths and sciences. He also attended popular lectures by Robert Ogden Doremus at the Cooper Institute. He did not complete his bachelor's degree but apprenticed for a while under a homeopathic physician who was on the faculty of New York Homeooathic Medical School. He dropped out of this as well and joined the College of Physicians and Surgeons at Columbia University receiving an MD in 1867 with a thesis on fatty degeneration of the liver. He then practiced at Irving Place, New York and a year later sought to study chemistry in Germany. He went to the Ludwig-Maximilians-Universität München where he worked under Jacob Volhard (1834–1910) as well as one series of lectures under Justus von Liebig (1803–1873) who was the main attraction for Remsen to move to Germany. He then went to the University of Göttingen, on the recommendation of Friedrich Wöhler, and studied organic chemistry under Rudolph Fittig (1835–1910). His 1870 doctorate was on investigations on piperic acid and its derivatives. He worked as an assistant to Fittig from 1870 to 1872 and during this time he met William Ramsay (1852–1916).

He married Elisabeth Hilleard Mallory on April 3, 1875, in New York City, New York. They had two children together. Their son, Ira Mallory Remsen (1876–1928), became an artist and playwright living in Carmel-by-the-Sea, California.

== Career ==
In 1872, after researching pure chemistry at University of Tübingen, Remsen returned to the United States and became a professor at Williams College, where he wrote the popular text Theoretical Chemistry. Remsen's book and reputation brought him to the attention of Daniel Coit Gilman, who invited him to become one of the original faculty of Johns Hopkins University. Remsen accepted and founded the department of chemistry there, overseeing his own laboratory. In 1879, Remsen founded the American Chemical Journal, which he edited for 35 years. He was elected as a member to the American Philosophical Society in 1879.

In 1879, Constantine Fahlberg, working with Remsen in a post-doctoral capacity, made an accidental discovery that changed Remsen's career. Eating rolls at dinner after a long day in the lab researching coal tar derivatives, Fahlberg noticed that the rolls tasted initially sweet but then bitter. Since his wife tasted nothing strange about the rolls, Fahlberg tasted his fingers and noticed that the bitter taste was probably from one of the chemicals in his lab. The next day at his lab he tasted the chemicals that he had been working with the previous day and discovered that it was the oxidation of o-toluenesulfonamide he had tasted the previous evening. He named the substance saccharin and he and his research partner Remsen published their finding in 1880. Later Remsen became angry after Fahlberg, in patenting saccharin (along with his uncle Adolph Moritz List), claimed that he alone had discovered saccharin. Remsen had no interest in the commercial success of saccharin, from which Fahlberg profited, but he was incensed at the perceived dishonesty of not crediting him as the head of the laboratory. Fahlberg would soon grow wealthy, while Remsen merely grew irritated, believing he deserved credit for substances produced in his laboratory. In a letter to Scottish chemist William Ramsay, Remsen commented, "Fahlberg is a scoundrel. It nauseates me to hear my name mentioned in the same breath with him." The controversy would enter court when Constantine Fahlberg, Adolph List, George Merck and Theodore Weicker went to court to sue A. Klipstein & Company of New York for patent violation. Klipstein used the claim that Remsen and Fahlberg were involved in the discovery and that Fahlberg had falsely claimed himself as the inventor. Remsen's testimony was also included in the case, but the documents are lost. The suit was ultimately dropped. When the American Chemical Society gave him the Priestley medal in 1923 the citation would mention that Remsen served the science of chemistry and sought no commercial gains from his work.

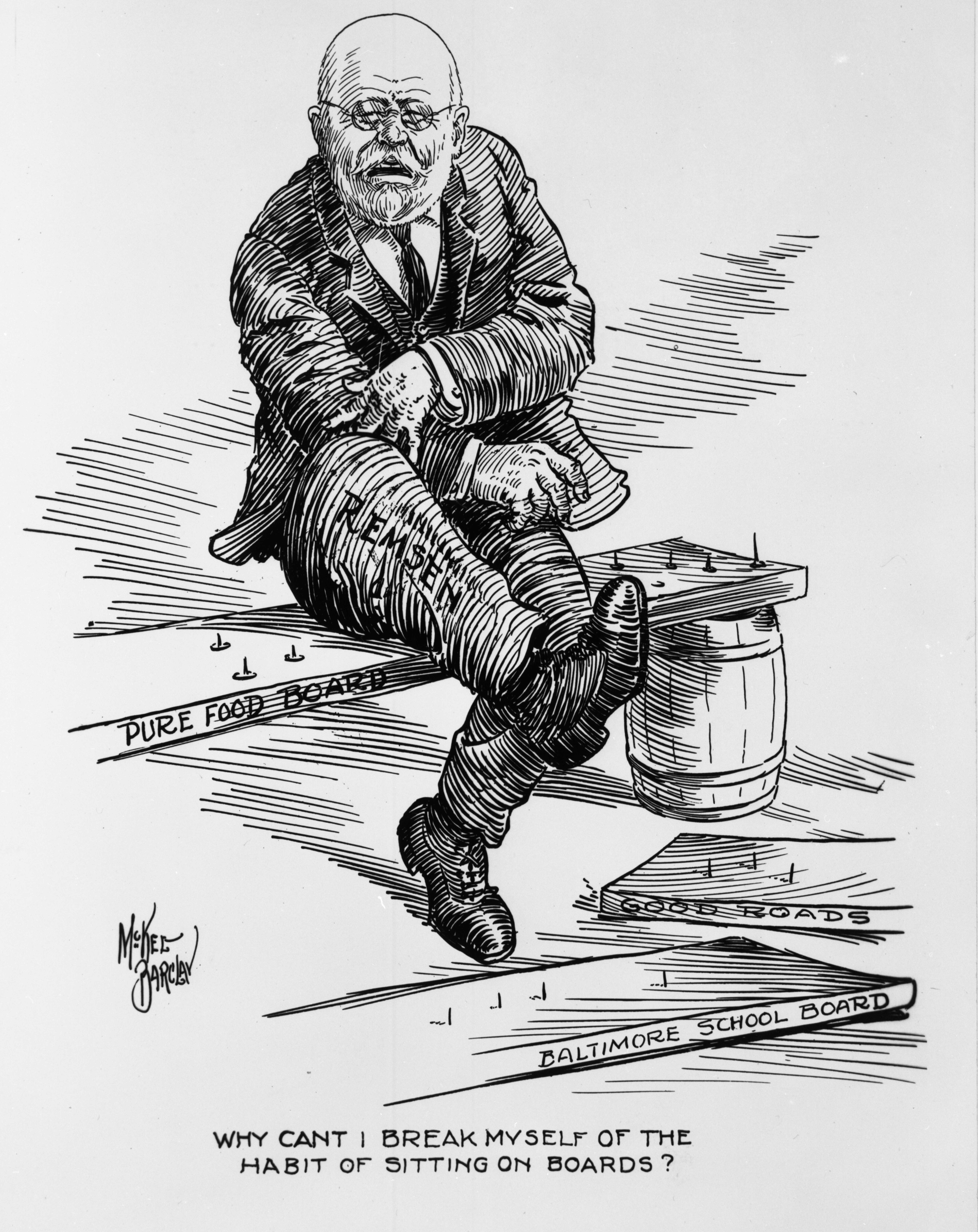
Cartoon depicting Remsen's position while serving on various committees, c. 1910

Throughout his academic career, Remsen was known as an excellent teacher, rigorous in his expectations but patient with the beginner. "His lectures to beginners were models of didactic exposition, and many of his graduate students owe much of their later success in their own lecture rooms to the pedagogical training received from attendance upon Remsen's lectures to freshmen." Remsen made his teaching laboratory centric. He founded the American Chemical Journal that he edited out of Baltimore and competed with the Journal of the American Chemical Society run by the American Chemical Society. The latter journal did not publish much in organic chemistry. Remsen had joined the ACS in 1878, but he let his membership expire. When he rejoined he was elected president in 1902. In 1913, he allowed his journal to be merged into the ACS journal.

In 1901 Remsen was appointed the president of Johns Hopkins, where he proceeded to found a School of Engineering and helped establish the school as a research university. He introduced many of the German laboratory techniques he had learned and wrote several important chemistry textbooks. In 1912, he stepped down as president, due to ill health, and retired to Carmel, California. While serving as a president of Johns Hopkins, he also took part in civil projects. He served on the Baltimore School Commission in efforts to improve the infrastructure of secondary education. In 1906, he was also involved in improvements to the Baltimore sewerage system. He also served on the Maryland Good Roads Commission. In 1909, he was posted as chairman of a board that dealt with food purity under the department of agriculture. The board came to be popularly called the "Remsen Board". There was considerable pressure from manufacturers to vilify the members of the board who were criticized in the press. A cartoon from this period depicted him sitting on a board with nails.

== Death ==
He died on March 4, 1927, in Carmel-by-the-Sea, California. His ashes are interred behind a plaque in the chemistry building on the Homewood campus at Johns Hopkins University.

== Legacy ==
In the 37 years of his service he guided 107 PhD students. In 1925 eighty-four of his students held positions as professors and forty were heads of chemistry departments in the US. After his death, the new chemistry building, completed in 1924, was named after him at Johns Hopkins. His ashes are located behind a plaque in Remsen Hall; he is the only person buried on campus.

His Baltimore house was added to the National Register of Historic Places and declared a National Historic Landmark in 1975.

Remsen Hall in Queens College is also named for him.

== Remsen Award ==
In 1946, to commemorate the centenary of Remsen, the Maryland chapter of the American Chemical Society, began awarding the Remsen award, in his honor. Awardees are frequently of the highest caliber, and included a sequence of 16 Nobel laureates between 1950 and 1980.

Recipients

- 1946: Roger Adams
- 1947: Samuel C. Lind
- 1948: Elmer V. McCollum
- 1949: Joel H. Hildebrand
- 1950: Edward C. Kendall
- 1951: Hugh Stott Taylor
- 1952: W. Mansfield Clark
- 1953: Edward L. Tatum
- 1954: Vincent du Vigneaud
- 1955: Willard F. Libby
- 1956: Farrington Daniels
- 1957: Melvin Calvin
- 1958: Robert B. Woodward
- 1959: Edward Teller
- 1960: Henry Eyring (chemist)
- 1961: Herbert C. Brown
- 1962: George Porter
- 1963: Harold C. Urey
- 1964: Paul Doughty Bartlett
- 1965: James R. Arnold
- 1966: Paul H. Emmett
- 1967: Marshall W. Nirenberg
- 1968: Har Gobind Khorana
- 1969: Albert L. Lehninger
- 1970: George S. Hammond
- 1971: George C. Pimentel
- 1972: Charles H. Townes
- 1973: Frank H. Westheimer
- 1974: Elias J. Corey
- 1975: Henry Taube
- 1976: William N. Lipscomb Jr.
- 1977: Ronald Breslow
- 1978: John Charles Polanyi
- 1979: Harry B. Gray
- 1980: Roald Hoffman
- 1981: Koji Nakanishi
- 1982: Harden McConnell
- 1983: George M. Whitesides
- 1984: Earl L. Muetterties
- 1985: Richard N. Zare
- 1986: Gilbert Stork
- 1987: Stephen J. Lippard
- 1988: Mildred Cohn
- 1989: K. Barry Sharpless
- 1990: Robert G. Bergman
- 1991: Rudolph A. Marcus
- 1992: William Klemperer
- 1993: Christopher T. Walsh
- 1994: Edward I. Solomon
- 1995: Alfred G. Redfield
- 1996: David A. Evans
- 1997: William Hughes Miller
- 1998: Peter Dervan
- 1999: Thomas J. Meyer
- 2000: Alexander Pines
- 2001: Ad Bax
- 2002: Matthew S. Platz
- 2003: Henry F. Schaefer III
- 2004: Samuel Danishefsky
- 2005: Judith P. Klinman
- 2006: Gabor A. Somorjai
- 2007: Peter F. Leadlay
- 2008: John C. Tully
- 2009: Jean Frechet
- 2010: John T. Groves
- 2011: Graham R. Fleming
- 2012: Daniel G. Nocera
- 2013: Eric Jacobsen
- 2014: Emily A. Carter
- 2015: JoAnne Stubbe
- 2016: Charles M. Lieber
- 2017: Robert H. Grubbs
- 2018: Chad Mirkin
- 2019: Catherine J. Murphy
- 2020: Tom W. Muir
- 2021: Todd Martinez
- 2022: Scott Miller
- 2023: Steven Sibener
- 2024: James M. Mayer
- 2025: Bettina V. Lotsch
