= Charles King Van Riper =

American writer

Charles K. Van Riper
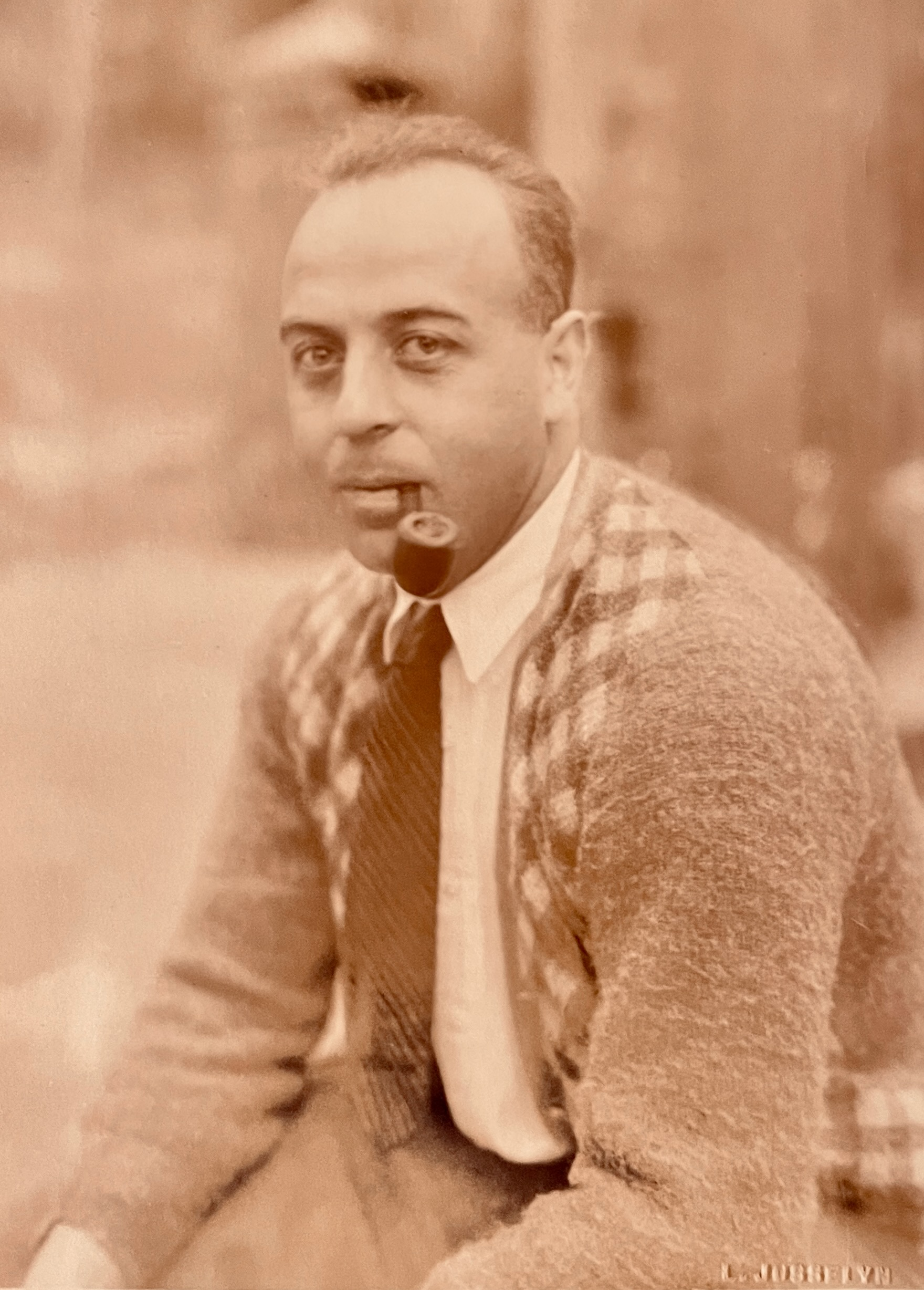
- Van Riper in 1924
- Born: Charles King Van Riper; September 8, 1891; Paterson, New Jersey, US
- Died: April 16, 1964 (aged 72); Tisbury, Massachusetts, US
- Education: Rutgers College
- Occupations: Writer, newspaperman, and playwright
- Spouses: Helen Dorothy Ordway (m. 1917; div. 1944) Celeste Corcoran (m. 1945)
- Children: 1
- Military career
- Allegiance: United States of America
- Branch: United States Army
- Service years: 1918
- Rank: Private, Sergeant, Officer's training candidate

Charles King Van Riper (September 8, 1891 – April 16, 1964) was an American newspaperman, writer, and playwright, best known for writing short stories for nationally circulated magazines, and as the founder of the Abalone League, the first organized softball league in the Western United States. He went on to build a successful ship-model shop and showroom in Vineyard Haven, Massachusetts. 285 of his ship models and archival materials are now part of the South Street Seaport Museum.

== Early life ==
Van Riper's father was Anthony B. Van Riper (1862-1917) of Paterson, New Jersey. He founded the silk manufacturer firm of Frost & Van Riper with his partner Harry B. Frost, for twenty-five years before his death.

Van Riper was a graduate of Rutgers College, class of 1913. Van Riper did newspaper work for New York and New Jersey newspapers until World War I, when he entered the United States Army Air Service. Van Riper was married to Helen Dorothy Ordway (1893-1965) and they had one child during their marriage, Anthony King (1926-2001). Van Riper was a soldier in the United States Army during World War I.

Soon after graduation, in 1913, Van Riper became president of the Knickerbocker Club, a new Eastside, Paterson club that wanted to look after both social and athletic interests. He was unanimously reelected president of the social club in 1914.

== Career ==
Van Riper began his career reporting at The Paterson Guardian, and went to the Newark Evening News, then took up story writing. After the World War I Van Riper came to Carmel-by-the-Sea to work freelance for newspapers, magazines, television, and writing plays.

In 1920, Van Riper and his wife, Helen, constructed a 6,575 square feet (610.8 m^{2}) Tudor-style home located at Carmel Point, that was built by Lee Gottfried. Next to the house was a garage and residence for servants. Directly below the Van Riper house was the former baseball field of the Abalone League, where both he and his wife played. Van Riper held the title of "commissioner" and issued the order to begin each season. Van Riper played an important role in establishing the Abalone League, the first organized softball league in the Western United States. The league brought men, women, and children for Sunday afternoon games. A historic plaque, situated on a stone wall at the former Van Riper property, serves as a tribute to the Abalone League.

Between the 1910s to 1930s, Van Riper published in magazines like Argosy, His short story Circumstances was a two part story that appeared on the front cover of The Argosy. When he moved to Vineyard Haven later in life, he wrote a short essay on the passage of vehicles, individuals, and times along the streets of his town. The piece was featured on the front page of the Vineyard Gazette on January 23, 1959.

In 1919, Van Riper wrote and produced a one-act play, Shadows that was performed near Carmel-by-the-Sea in an open-air production at a time when Carmel artists were trying to further the dramatic arts in California. A staff writer from the San Francisco Bulletin said that, "Van Riper leads his characters, with the inevitable quality of good drama, and the unctuous declamation at the close, by which the audience is assured that all is well and justice has been done... Last night's effort was one of their best."

Van Riper wrote The Getaway, in 1924, a melodrama "play of adventure" announced in Variety by Edward Childs Carpenter, president of the Dramatists Theater, Inc., of New York City. On January 4, 1925, the Dramatists Theater announced the purchase of The Getaway. During September 1925, Van Riper's The Getaway appeared at Nixon's Apollo Theatre in Atlantic City, New Jersey with a cast including Violet Heming, Minor Watson, C. Henry Gordon, Paul Harvey, Louis Sorin, and others. Reviews appeared in Variety and The Press of Atlantic City, one review by George R. Weintraub said, "The Getaway is just good entertainment, never once lagging in interest, with a bit of romance running through it and enough humor to tone down several real thrilling moments." Another review noted, "Here is one that has everything. It ranks high as one of the cleverest bits of satire yet tried out in this man's town. The local scribes lauded it to the skies." The Getaway made an appearance on the stage at the Belasco Theatre in Washington, D.C., on September 21, 1925. The play was announced for production by stage director Edward Childs Carpenter, in association with Broadway theatrical producer William Harris Jr.. The show was scheduled to open for Broadway, opening October 5.

In 1932, amid the Great Depression, Van Riper wrote a one-act play titled The Crossing specifically for an all-black cast. The play was staged at the Sunset School auditorium as a fundraiser for the Carmel Employment Commission's Fund.

=== Theater ===
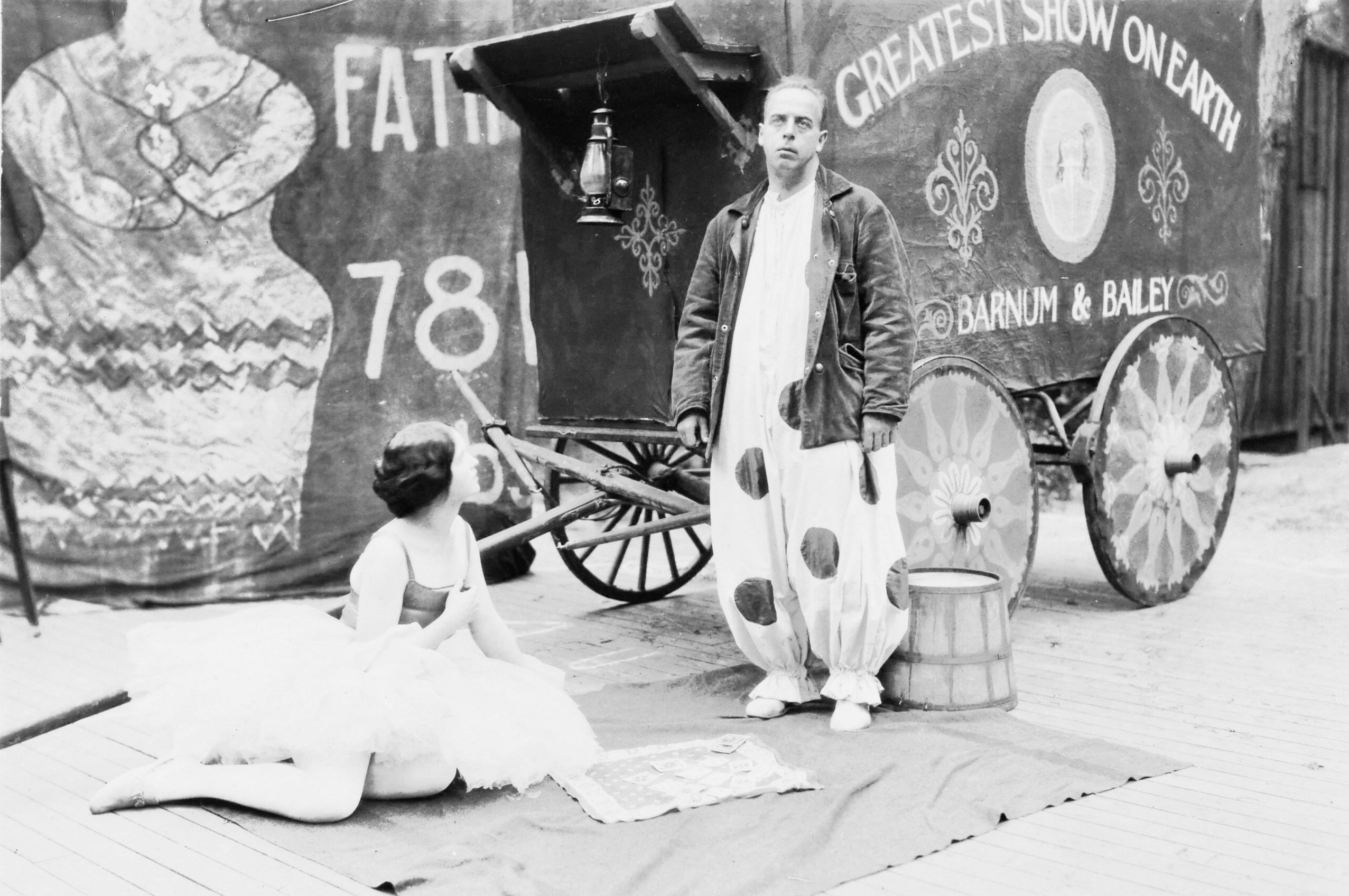
Van Riper acting in the play Mr. Bunt

Van Riper was active in theatrical as well as civic activities. In 1924, Van Riper played a role in Mr. Bunt, an original play by Ira Mallory Remsen, which won the $100.00 prize annually offered by the Forest Theater. Michael J. Phillips from The Morning Press said this about Van Riper, "Charles King Van Riper as Jim, the circus clown ... shows a great deal of acting ability. He made Jim a faulty but likeable human being who wasn't just a character in a show, but a real man."

Van Riper was friends with writer Harry Leon Wilson and toured the South Seas together in 1924. He acted as one of Wilson's seconds in the Duel with Theodore Criley at the Carmel Highlands, California in 1922.

=== Civic life ===
Van Riper was among the first to influence the thinking of the Carmel village. and was involved in village matters and was referred to as "solid as a rock."

In 1938, Van Riper was head of the committee to obtain signatures for a petition for the Sunset School District to secede from the Monterey Union High School District. The Sunset School District voted 724 in favor of, and 252 against, the passing of a $165,000 (equivalent to $3,773,936 in 2025) bond issue for a new Carmel high school.

=== Van Ryper ship models ===
In the early 1930s, Van Ripper began making ship models in his home in Maine, as a hobby. In 1933, after a polo injury in California, Van Riper traveled to Massachusetts to spend time with relatives and to visit his brother, Donald Van Riper. Charles and his wife Helen fell in love with Martha's Vineyard. That same year, Van Riper expanded his hobby and opened a ship model shop and showroom in Vineyard Haven, Massachusetts, where he used the traditional Dutch spelling of his name for the shop's name, Van Ryper of Vineyard Haven. He worked in a two-story wooden building on Beach Road. He started with a small group of 8 craftsmen who were hired to build the model ships. The shop listed more than 250 different model ships in stock. His models gained a reputation for scale accuracy, attention to detail and quality. He specialized in island steams and transatlantic liners. Customers included naval architects, shipping firms and ocean liner companies. In 1938, the shop received requests for ship-models from Moore-McCormack operating shipping lines. His "Travel Series" were among the most popular models, which were waterline models depicting the world's shipping lines from the 1920s and 1930s.

With the outbreak of World War II, the United States Maritime Commission placed orders for "recognition models" at a scale of 1 ft (0.30 m) to 64 ft (20 m), to help teach sailors and naval aviators how to recognize warships by their silhouettes. The first order was for the famous Liberty Ships, later orders were for complete sets of Japanese and German warships. Van Ryper also produced model airplanes which were designed to be photographed "in flight," that contributed to the creation of illustrations for aircraft-recognition pamphlets. The business grew as Van Ryper expanded from 1 building to 3 and had over 50 staff members working two shifts to produce the wartime models. Some of the models were very large, one being over 30 feet long and built from actual blueprints, it was constructed completely of metal and also replicated the interior structure of the ship. A contemporary newspaper article in the Vineyard Gazette said the shipyard was a "genuine war industry". In July 1942, a fire destroyed much of the shop but they were able to rebuild. By 1943, the business for recognition models began to wind down, and the company reverted to its former purpose of building individual models for consumers.

Post-war, he resumed making merchant ships and liners. A scale model of the SS Will Rogers was made for the Will Rogers Memorial in Claremore, Oklahoma. The model approximately 5 ft (1.5 m) long, was acquired by the Will Rogers Memorial commission from the Van Ryper shipbuilders. Riper's shop created a ship model of the SS Leviathan an International Mercantile Marine Company ocean liner, along with the SS President Roosevelt and SS President Harding. The models were advertised in various magazines, and "sold well".

The shop continued production of handcrafting models until 1960, reportedly producing over 150,000 models during its nearly 30 years of operation. In 1960, Van Riper stopped production at the shop after having a stroke. He kept the showroom open for another two years.

In October 1944, Van Riper divorced Ordway and married Celeste "Cece" Corcoran on October 5, 1945, in the Unitarian Church of All Souls in New York.

== Death and legacy ==
Van Riper died on April 16, 1964, in Tisbury, Massachusetts, at the age of 72. His wife died on May 2, 1965, in a Boston, Massachusetts hospital, at the age of 71.

In 1982, the South Street Seaport Museum acquired a collection of 285 Van Ryper ship models and archival materials from Van Riper's son, Anthony K. Van Riper.

== Selected works ==
- The Nocturnal New Yorker (1916)
- The Gentleman Strangler (1918)
- Shadows (1919)
- Two Marked Twenties (1919)
- The Man Who Knew (1920)
- The Puffer (1920)
- Circumstances (1920)
- The Hole in the Doughnut (1920)
- Caesar's Choice (1920)
- From Behind the Fence (1920)
- Two Many Champions (1923)
- The Blue Lightning (1923)
- Requiem (1923)
- The Expositor Short Story (1924)
- The Gateway (1925)
- Thieves' Holiday (1926)
- The Crossing (1932)
- Legion Of Ships (1938)

== Gallery ==
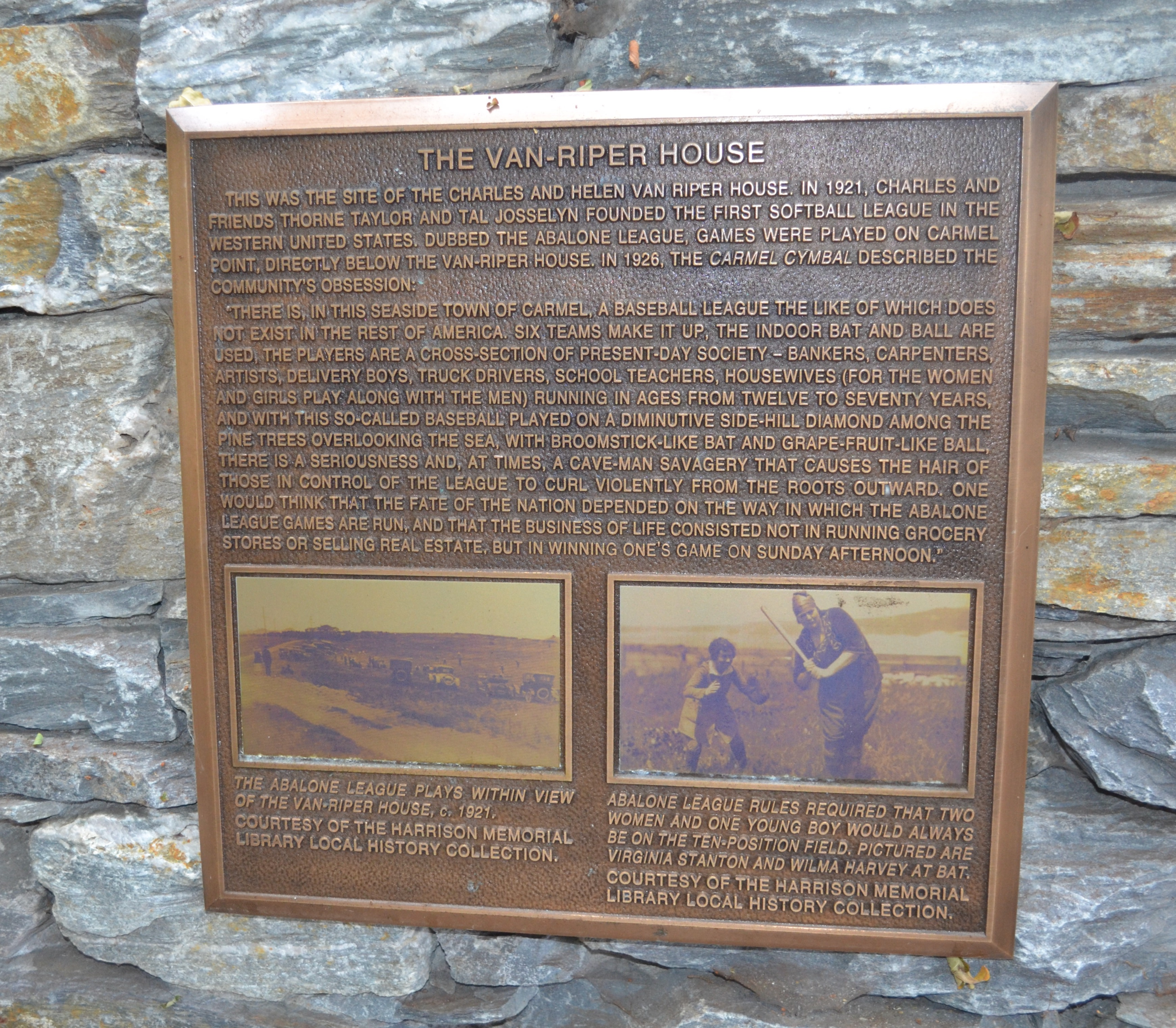
Abalone League Historic Plaque

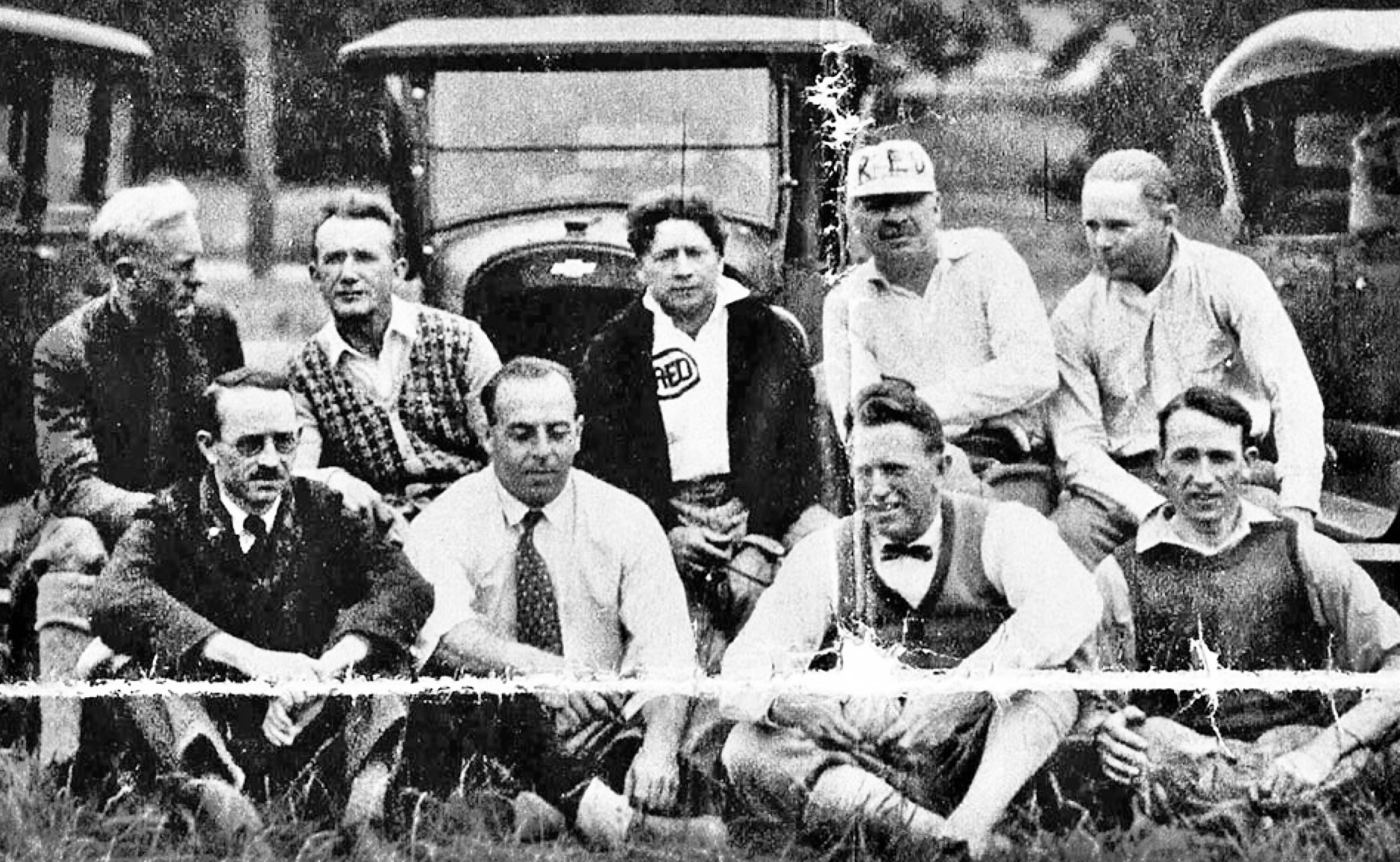
Van Ripper (btm row 2nd l) as one of the players for the Abalone League

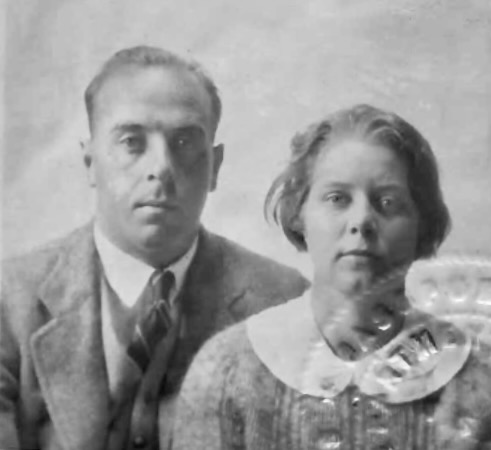
1923 US passport picture of Charles King Van Riper and wife Helen

== See also ==
- Timeline of Carmel-by-the-Sea, California
