= Ernest Haskell =

American artist

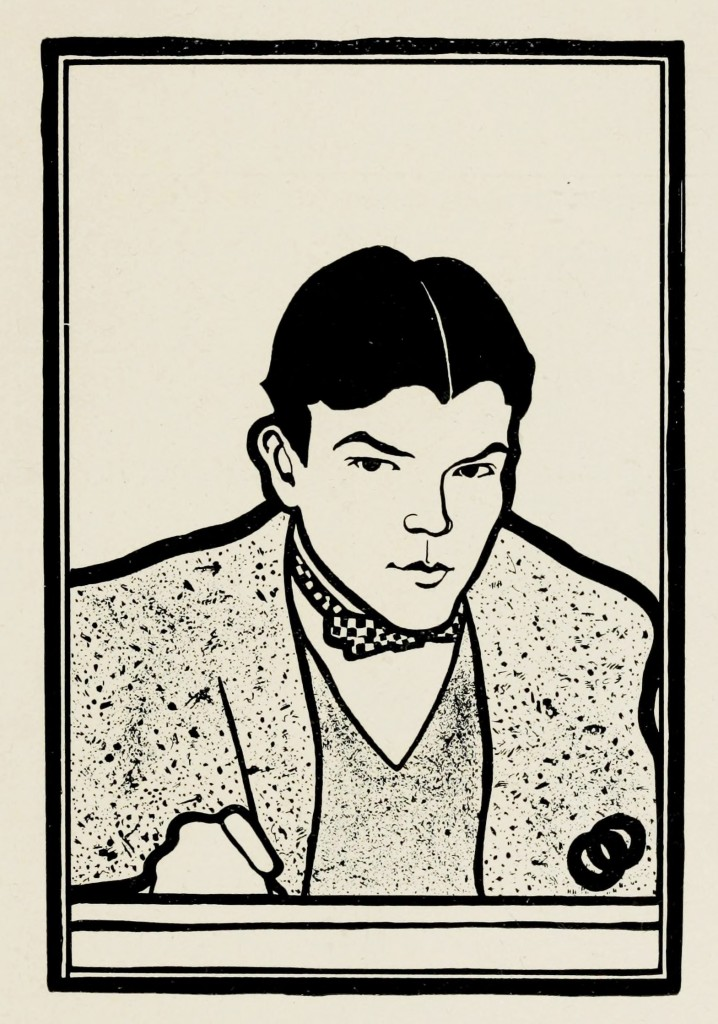
- Self portrait by Haskell
- Born: June 30, 1876; Woodstock, Connecticut
- Died: November 1, 1925 (aged 49); Phippsburg, Maine

Ernest Haskell (June 30, 1876 - November 1, 1925) was an American artist and illustrator, internationally famous in his lifetime and remembered for his etchings, as well as engravings, pen-and-ink drawings, lithographs and watercolors. He was a pioneer in the field of theatrical posters. He created many portraits and caricatures of luminaries of the day. During World War I he was commissioned by the United States Army to develop camouflage painting. Haskell's etchings and intaglio prints are considered by critics and scholars to be his most important contribution.

== Biography ==
Ernest Haskell was born on June 30, 1876, in Woodstock, Connecticut. His mother was Caledonia deRennes Haskell and his father was Besture Haskell. Ernest spent his childhood on the Haskell farm and attended Woodstock Academy. While convalescing from an attack of typhoid fever, he passed the time sketching and drawing. Ernest was a teenager and had expected to attend Yale University on a football scholarship he had secured. However, his artwork attracted attention which led to an offer of employment in the field of magazine illustration. Soon he was working in New York City as a professional artist in the art department of the New York American. His techniques were mainly self-taught at this point. Over the next decade Haskell made three extended trips to Paris, France, for the purpose of conducting independent art studies. Haskell was encouraged and assisted in this endeavor by his older sister Mabel Percy Haskell, herself an artist and writer and newspaper correspondent. On the first trip he enrolled in a prestigious art school, the Academie Julian, but did not stay, instead devising his own system of studying and practicing. For a time Ernest was a protege and friend of James McNeill Whistler, who taught him to make etchings. He made several caricatures of Whistler.

Upon returning to New York from Paris in the late 1890s Haskell brought with him techniques he had learned in the field of advertising and theatrical posters. His work in this area became very popular. He made posters promoting magazines such as Scribner's, Collier's, Truth, and Pearson's. His portrait subjects included stage actresses Helen Hayes, Ethel Barrymore, Minnie Maddern Fiske (no relation to Haskell although the famous poster of Mrs. Fiske by him was printed by her cousin at Ottman Lithographic Co.) and Maude Adams. He was a member of the Players club on Gramercy Park in Manhattan during this period.

Haskell himself was the subject of a portrait by Zaida Ben-Yusuf (published in The Critic magazine September 1899), who was known for her artistically rendered photographic portraits of eminent artists and political figures of her time.

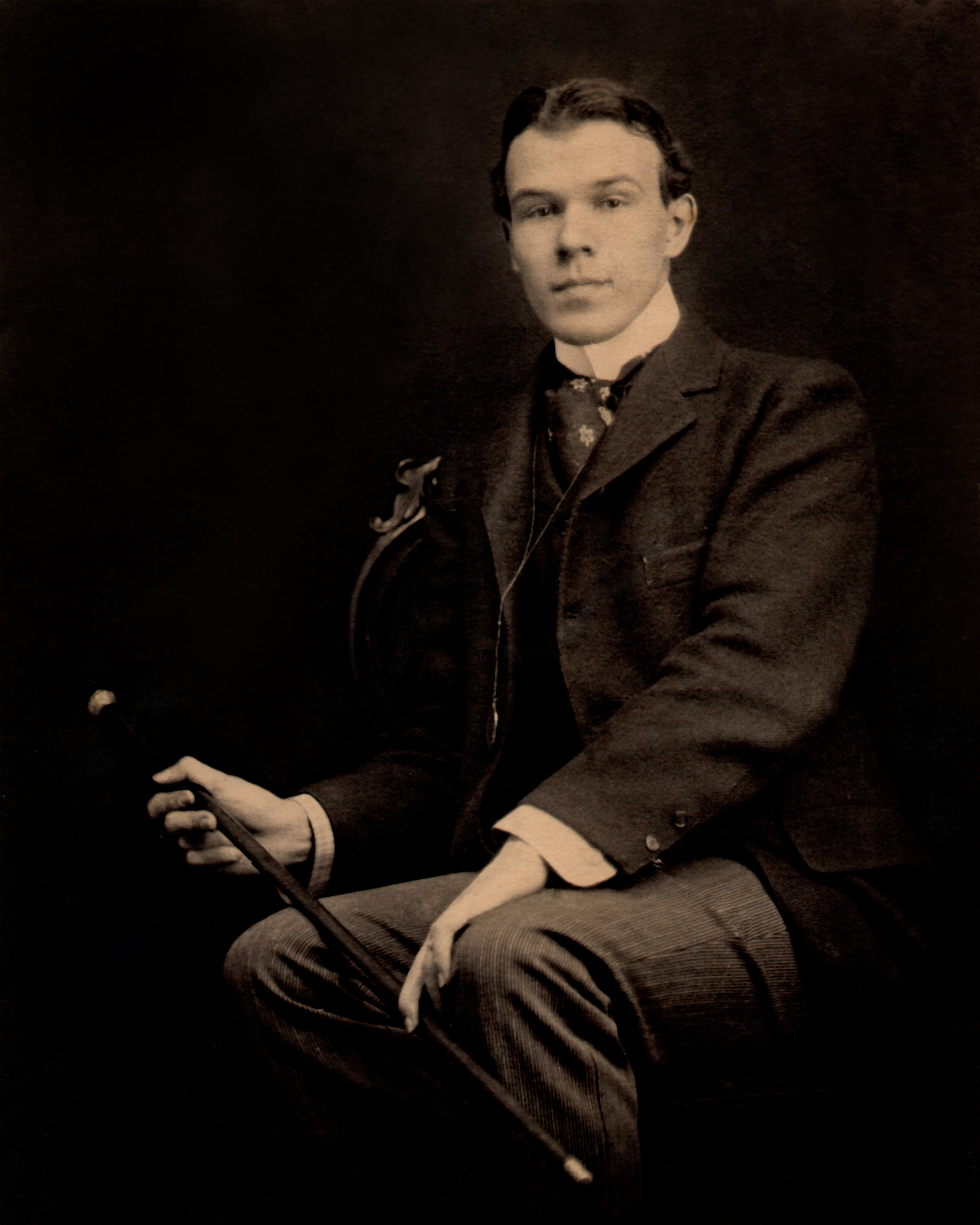
Ernest Haskell by Zaida Ben-Yusuf New York City 1899

In 1903 he married Elizabeth Louise Foley, a writer and member of New York society, and in 1906 they bought some land and a farmhouse on the coast of Maine in the town of Phippsburg. They lived there in the summer seasons, returning to New York City during the winter months. Haskell worked on etching and painting in the summers, and on trips to California, while maintaining portrait commissions and commercial work in the winters. In 1915 he was engaged by the newly formed Metro Pictures Corporation (later to become MGM films) as a poster artist. Ernest and Elizabeth had two children, Hildegarde and Eben. During this period Haskell was doing much work in the line of creating etchings, in Maine as well as in California and Florida. When exhibited, these met with critical acclaim, so Haskell became known as a "fine" artist as well as a portraitist and poster lithographer. He belonged to the group of artists who were exhibited at Alfred Stieglitz' famed 291 Gallery in New York City. He also had one man shows at the Pratt Institute in Brooklyn, the Berlin Photographic Company and the Art Institute of Chicago among other venues. Haskell exhibited with the Brooklyn Society of Etchers from 1916 to 1922.

Ernest Haskell served in World War I in the Camouflage Unit. He was one of the artists who developed camouflage painting for the United States Army to disguise battleships and to use on soldiers' uniforms. His wife Elizabeth contracted influenza in the 1918 flu pandemic and died in New York City. Ernest took the children and went to live in northern California.

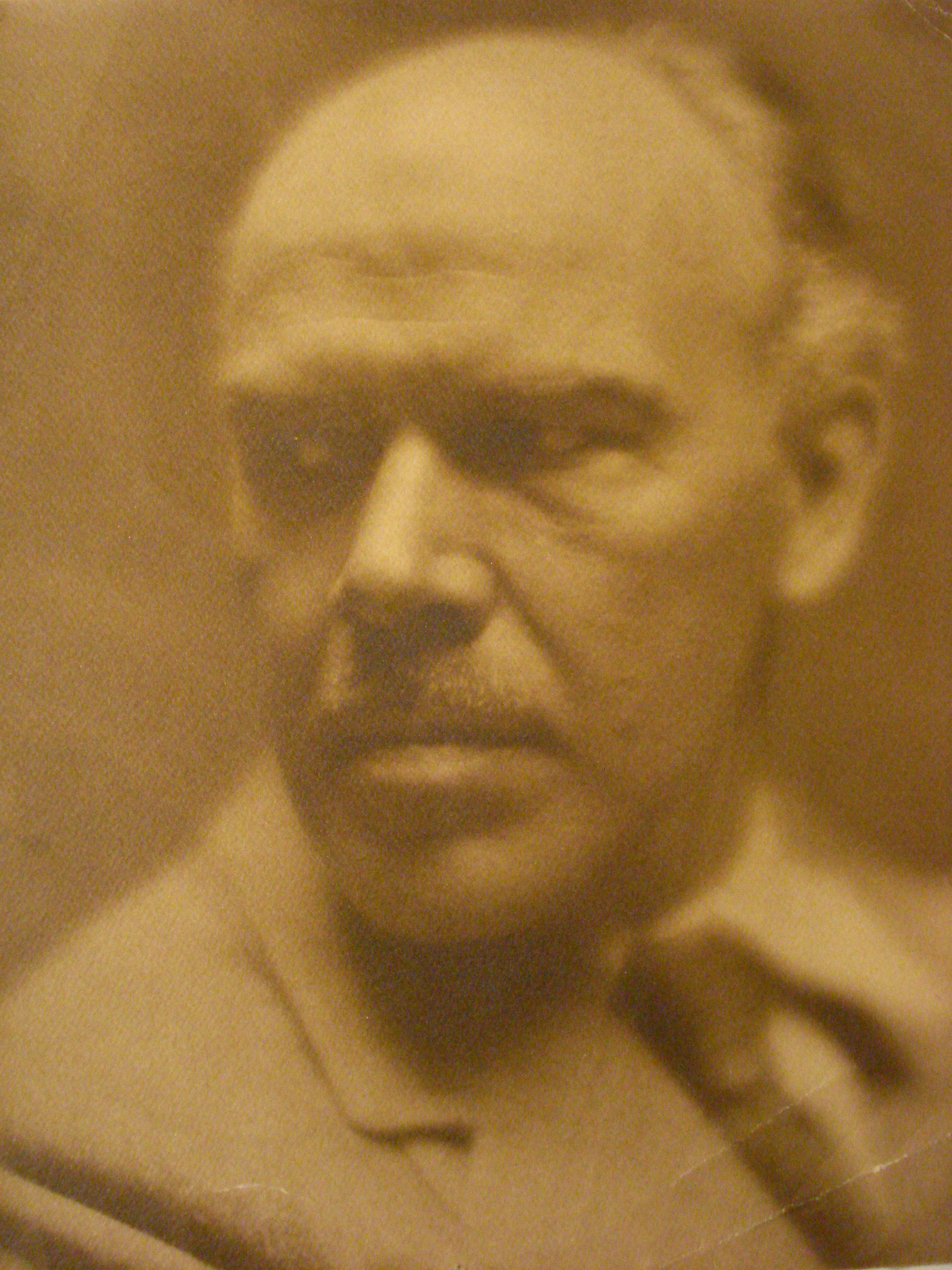
Ernest Haskell by Dorothea Lange

In 1920, at the studio of photographer Dorothea Lange, he met Emma Loveland Laumeister. They were married in San Francisco and returned to New York City, where twins Ernest Jr. and Josephine were born. The pattern of dividing time between New York and Maine continued for about four years. At that time, Haskell had been working in watercolors which were admired for their modern style. On November 1, 1925, he was returning to his family in Maine after organizing an exhibition of the new paintings in New York when he was involved in a fatal automobile accident near West Point in Phippsburg, Maine.

The exhibition became a memorial show at the Macbeth Gallery in New York City. Ernest was eulogized by fellow artists and friends John Marin and Childe Hassam among others. Royal Cortissoz called him "a brilliant artist". Henry McBride called him "the American etcher".

== Legacy ==
In the years since Ernest Haskell's death there have been numerous retrospective shows of his work. Among these were three shows in the centennial year of his birth, 1976, at the Honolulu Academy of Art, the Bowdoin College Museum of Art, and the New York Public Library. In 1981 there was a show called "Ernest Haskell: A Retrospective of Prints" at Associated American Artists on Fifth Avenue in New York City, curated by Sylvan Cole Jr. Ernest Haskell's work was included in an exhibition entitled "Three Centuries of American Art" at MOMA, the Museum of Modern Art in New York City, in 1938.

His work is being re-discovered in the 21st century, one example of this being a major exhibition in 2011 at the Mead Art Museum, Amherst College, "How He Was to His Talents, the Work of Ernest Haskell", researched and curated by Andrew Mellon Curatorial Fellow Katrina E. Greene. There are collections of Ernest Haskell works in many museums in the United States and abroad, including the Metropolitan Museum of Art in New York and the Hunterian Gallery, Glasgow University in Scotland.

As of 2017, the property on the coast of Maine, in Phippsburg, where Haskell did some of his later work has been added to the National Register of Historic Places in the United States.
