= Ray Strong =

American painter

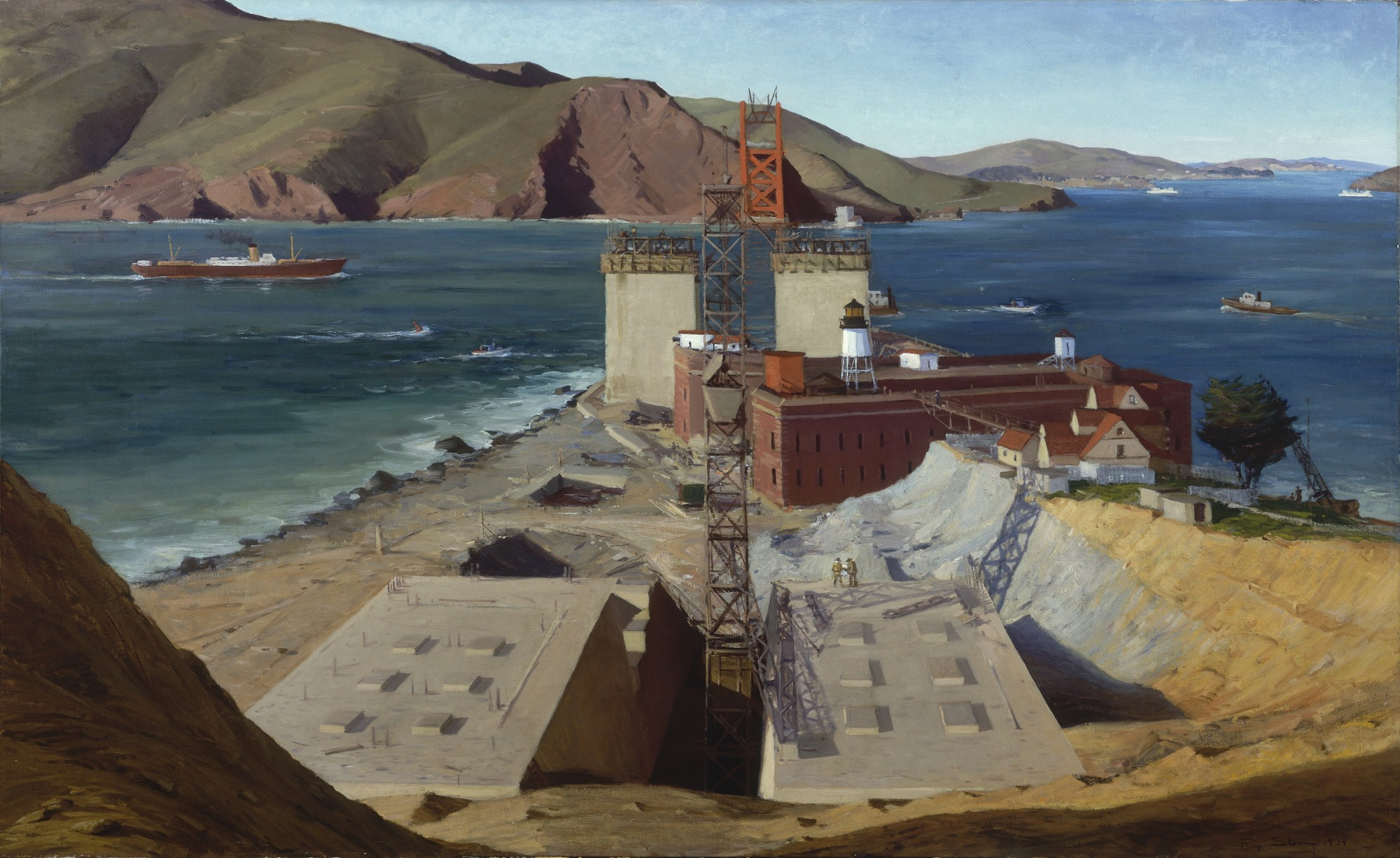
- Golden Gate Bridge (1934) oil on canvas, produced for the Public Works of Art Project
- Born: Ray Stanford Strong; January 3, 1905; Corvallis, Oregon, U.S.
- Died: July 3, 2006 (aged 101); Three Rivers, California, U.S.
- Education: California School of Fine Arts, Art Students League of New York
- Known for: Painting

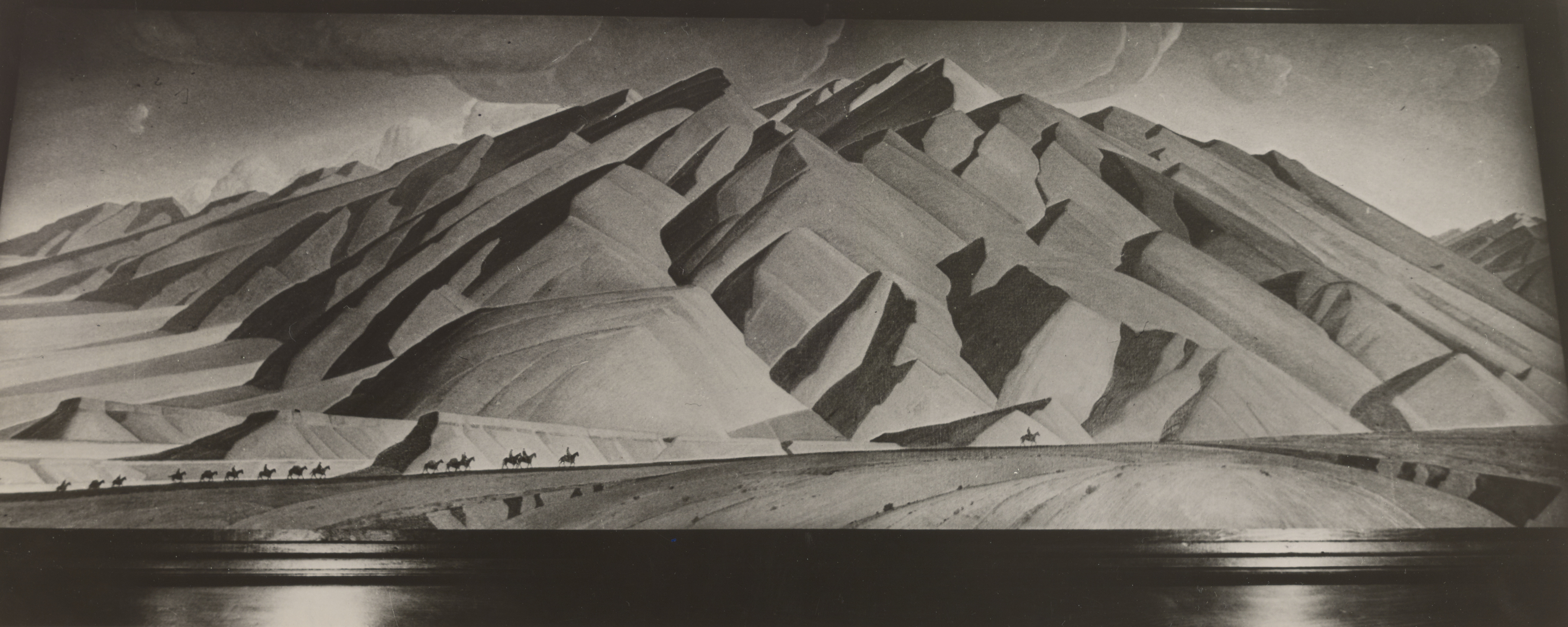
San Gabriel County (1938), mural for the post office at San Gabriel, California

Ray Stanford Strong (January 3, 1905 – July 3, 2006) was an American painter from Corvallis, Oregon. He associated with the New Deal muralists in the San Francisco Bay Area.

== Early life and education ==
Ray Strong was born in Corvallis, Oregon, the youngest of three brothers. Though trained in law, his father ran the family saw mill. Because of illness Ray was home schooled for two years, during which time he became intrigued by painting and drawing.

Strong was educated at the California School of Fine Arts (now known as San Francisco Art Institute) in San Francisco and the Art Students League of New York.

He later founded the San Francisco Art Students League (a cooperative space featuring an art gallery, art classes, and art supply store) and participated in the Works Progress Administration during the 1930s. He wanted to travel to Spain to fight in the Spanish Civil War but was persuaded by his friend Ansel Adams to remain in the United States and paint.

== Works ==
Strong's 1934 painting, Golden Gate Bridge, was chosen by President Franklin D. Roosevelt to hang in the White House, celebrating the feat of engineering. Strong's artwork includes the oil on canvas mural titled San Gabriel County in the San Gabriel, California post office, commissioned by the Treasury Section of Fine Arts, and completed in 1938.

In 1953, Strong served as the President of the Marin Society of Arts. Strong worked as a teacher and lecturer in Oregon. He moved to Santa Barbara, California in 1960. His paintings usually depicted the California landscape. He had a commitment to the environment and was part of the Oak Group which opposed the encroachment of the oil industry onto the local landscape. Several of his paintings are in the permanent collection of the Smithsonian American Art Museum. His painting Indian Summer II is in the collection of the Oakland Museum of California.

== 100th Birthday ==
To mark his 100th birthday a tribute was made to Ray Strong in the U.S. House of Representatives by Lois Capps, describing him as "a talented artist, generous teacher and role model to many."

Strong continued to paint in his studio, close to the entrance to Sequoia National Park, until shortly before he died, age 101 on July 3, 2006.
