= Edinburgh: Picturesque Notes =

1878 non-fiction travel book by Robert Louis Stevenson

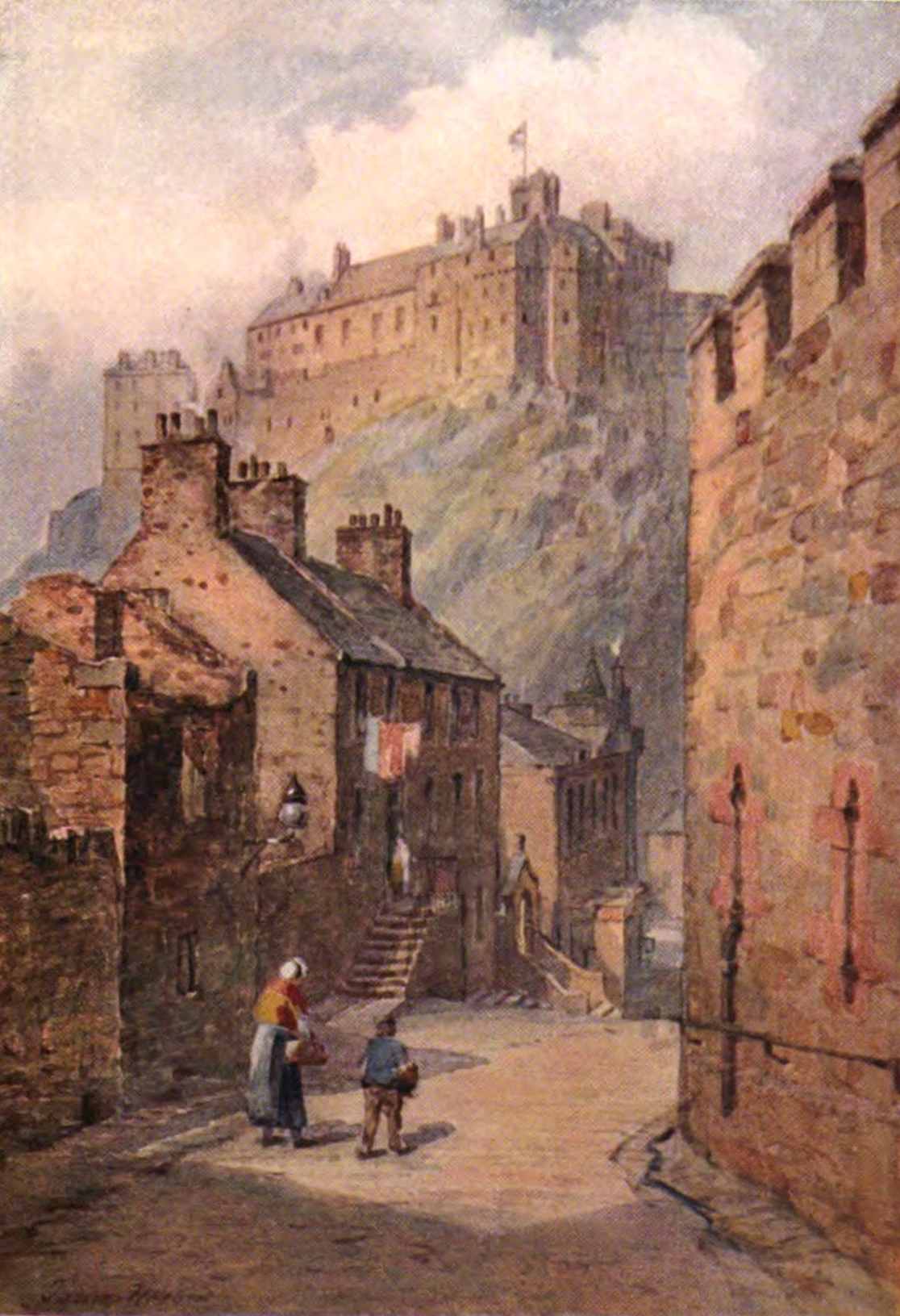
Edinburgh (1914 edition) by Robert Louis Stevenson. Illustrated by James Heron.

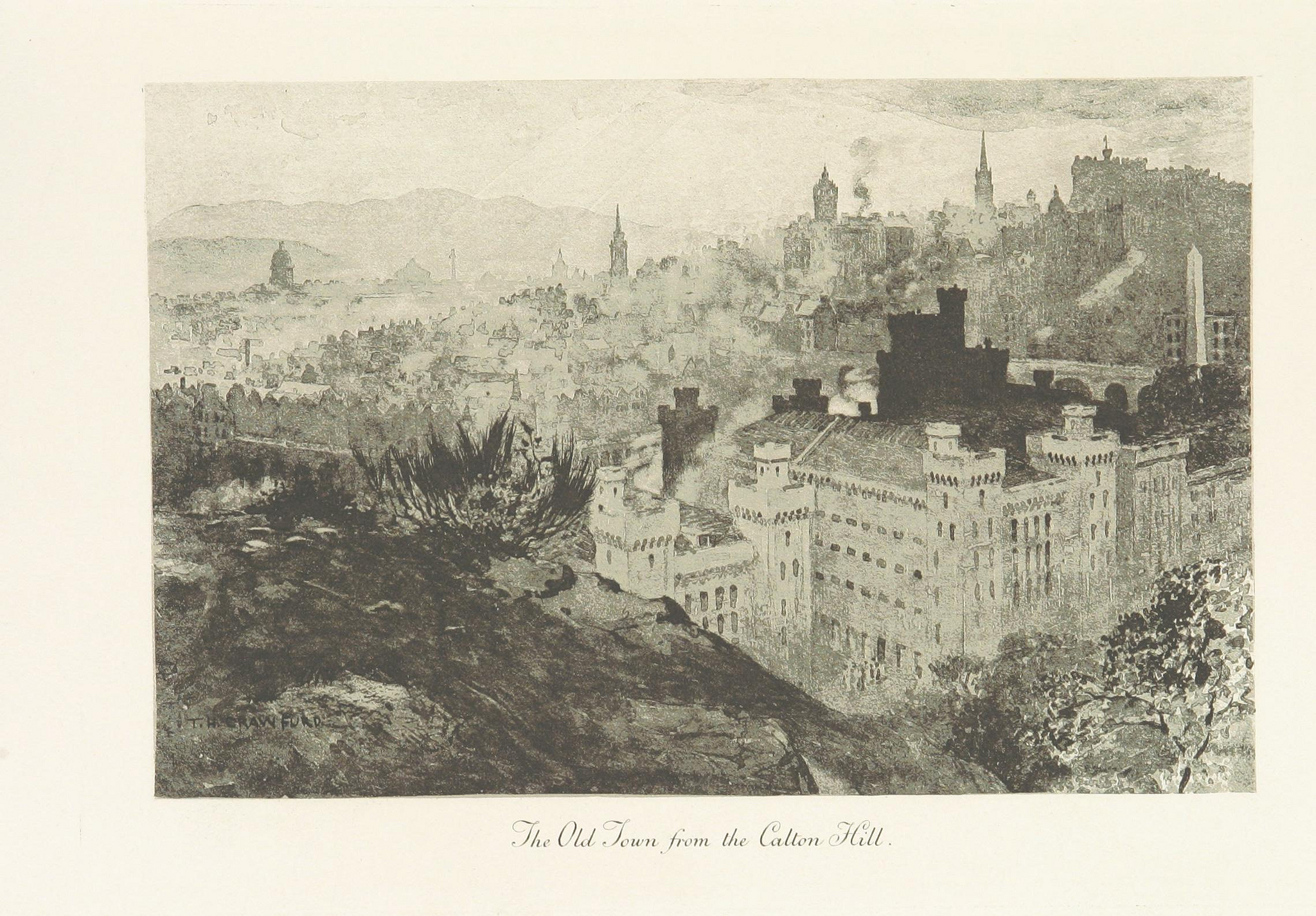
Image taken from page 179 of 'Edinburgh: Picturesque Notes' by Robert Louis Stevenson. With etchings by A. Brunet-Debaines from drawings by S. Bough and W. E. Lockhart.

Edinburgh: Picturesque Notes (titled as Edinburgh in some editions) is a non-fiction travel book written by the Scottish author Robert Louis Stevenson. It was first published in December 1878 as "a paean to his birthplace" and was his second published book following An Inland Voyage.

Editions of the work are often illustrated. A new edition of the book was published by the London publishing company Manderley Press in 2021, featuring artwork by Iain McIntosh and an introduction by Alexander McCall Smith.

== Structure ==
The book began as a series of articles which appeared in the magazine, The Portfolio. It provides Stevenson's personal introduction to each part of the city and some history behind the various sections of the city and its most famous buildings:

"The ancient and famous metropolis of the North sits overlooking a windy estuary from the slope and summit of three hills. No situation could be more commanding for the head city of a kingdom; none better chosen for noble prospects.... the quarter of the Castle overtops the whole city and keeps an open view to sea and land. It dominates for miles on every side; and people on the decks of ships, or ploughing in quiet country places over in Fife, can see the banner on the Castle battlements, and the smoke of the Old Town blowing abroad over the subjacent country. A city that is set upon a hill. It was, I suppose, from this distant aspect that she got her nickname of Auld Reekie. Perhaps it was given her by people who had never crossed her doors: day after day, from their various rustic Pisgahs, they had seen the pile of building on the hill-top, and the long plume of smoke over the plain; so it appeared to them; so it had appeared to their fathers tilling the same field; and as that was all they knew of the place, it could be all expressed in these two words." - Robert Louis Stevenson, Edinburgh:Picturesque Notes (1903 edition)

It was then published as a book divided into ten chapters and consisting of a series of essays describing different areas of Edinburgh: the Old Town, the Parliament Close, Greyfriar’s Kirkyard, the New Town, the villas in Morningside, Calton Hill and the Pentland Hills.

== Reception ==
Despite his affection for the city, Stevenson did not shy away from detailing the darker aspects of life in Edinburgh however; including references to its more gruesome history and inhabitants such as Deacon Brodie, whose dual life proved inspiration for Stevenson's Strange Case of Dr Jekyll and Mr Hyde, and Major Thomas Weir, who was executed for adultery, bestiality and incest and accused of witchcraft. Stevenson's vivid and frank depiction of the city also includes mention of Edinburgh's plague-ridden past, when officials punished those hiding their plague symptoms by drowning women in the Quarry Holes and hanging men in their own doorways.

So the book acts as part guidebook, part memoir and part social history of the city which not every reader appreciated upon the book's publication. This caused the inclusion of this notable footnote from Stevenson responding to criticisms to appear in the first chapter of subsequent editions:

"These sentences have, I hear, given offence in my native town, and a proportionable pleasure to our rivals of Glasgow. I confess the news caused me both pain and merriment. May I remark, as a balm for wounded fellow-townsmen, that there is nothing deadly in my accusations? Small blame to them if they keep ledgers: 'tis an excellent business habit. Churchgoing is not, that ever I heard, a subject of reproach; decency of linen is a mark of prosperous affairs, and conscious moral rectitude one of the tokens of good living. It is not their fault it the city calls for something more specious by way of inhabitants. A man in a frock-coat looks out of place upon an Alp or Pyramid, although he has the virtues of a Peabody and the talents of a Bentham. And let them console themselves - they do as well as anybody else; the population of (let us say) Chicago would cut quite as rueful a figure on the same romantic stage. To the Glasgow people I would say only one word, but that is of gold; I have not yet written a book about Glasgow." - Robert Louis Stevenson, Edinburgh: Picturesque Notes.

If there was criticism from some Edinburgh denizens then this was balanced out with more effusive praise of Stevenson's book elsewhere. The 1896 edition was reviewed in the London-based magazine, the Ludgate Monthly:

"It is difficult to think of any subject concerning which you would not have rejoiced to read [Stevenson's] expression of opinions or lack of opinions. Moreover, he had dipped deep into the huge stores of matter, legendary, historical, semi-historical, ready to the hand of him of who would know about the Scottish capital....

To the Scot, it ought to be a sort of Bible."

== Illustrations ==
In 1878, the magazine articles were illustrated by etchings which were subsequently used in the first edition of the book. Further editions, in 1896, in 1912 and in 1923, would be illustrated with drawings and with coloured decorations. These editions included work by:

- Alfred-Louis Brunet-Debaines
- Thomas Hamilton Crawford
- Sam Bough
- William Ewart Lockhart
- James Heron

The American photographer Alvin Langdon Coburn helped illustrate a later edition of the book in 1954 with a series of photographs he had taken half a century earlier in 1905. These photographs he regarded as some of his "very best" work though he always regretted that he never got to meet Stevenson himself, who had died in 1894.

"I never met Stevenson in the flesh. It is one of my great regrets that I came just a little too late to make his portrait, but I have all his books and have read them many times, so that I seem to know him better than some of my other friends. Through his Edinburgh and in his Edinburgh I seem to know him best of all".- Alvin Langdon Coburn.
