= Sydney J. Yard =

American painter (1855–1909)

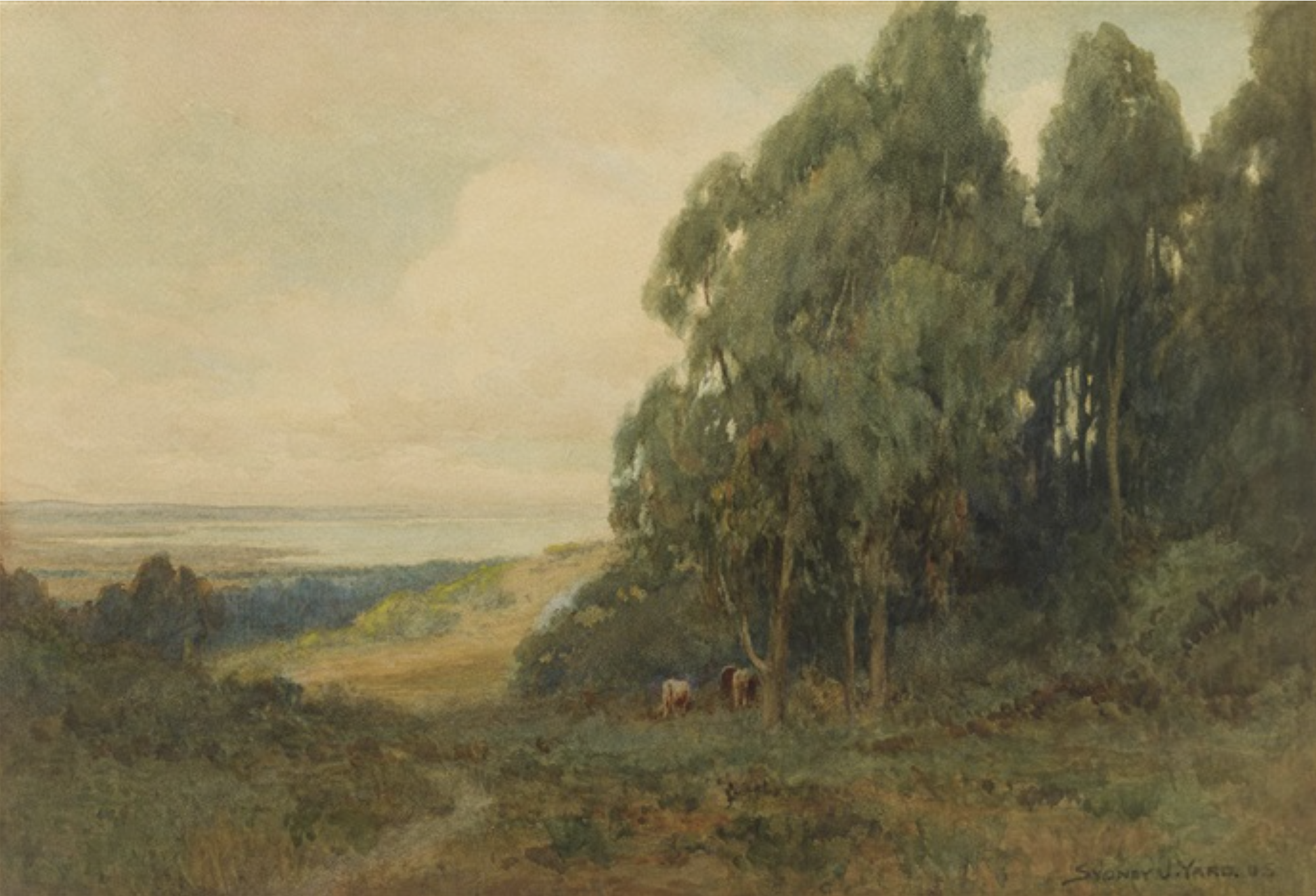
- Cows in a California coastal landscape by Sydney J. Yard, ca. 1905
- Born: Sydney Jones Yard; November 5, 1855; Rockford, Illinois, U.S.
- Died: January 2, 1909 (aged 53); Carmel-by-the-Sea, California, U.S.
- Occupation: Painter
- Known for: Watercolor painting
- Spouses: Carrie E. Millard (m. 1877; died 1894) Fannie M. Estabrook (m. 1898)
- Children: 1
- Relatives: Charles Chapel Judson (son-in-law)

Sydney Jones Yard (November 5, 1855 – January 2, 1909) was an American watercolor artist, known as one of the region's great painters in the 19th century, and the first professional artist to settle in the new community of Carmel-by-the-Sea, California.

== Early life ==
Sydney Jones Yard was born on November 5, 1855, in Rockford, Illinois. He was the son of William K. Yard and Mary Ann Jones. Yard was first married to Carrie E. Millard in 1877, but she died on August 27, 1894.

After the death of his wife, Yard moved to San Jose, California with his daughter, Bessie. He remarried to Fannie M. Estabrook on July 18, 1898, in Santa Clara, California. Yard was married twice.

== Career ==
Yard was trained as a painter in Chicago, Illinois and New York, New York and then in England with artist Harold Sutton Palmer (1853–1933). He became a master of English watercolor technique. He was also an oil painter. His works were in the Tonalist tradition of George Inness and William Keith, where the emphasis was on painting modest, Barbizon influenced scenes, rendered in warm tones. Yard's watercolors were of the eucalyptus, oaks, and the cypress trees.

In 1882, Yard moved to California and joined a partnership with photographer Andrew Putman Hill (1853–1922). They had portrait studios in San Jose, California and Palo Alto, California. In 1892, the two men exhibited photographs of Santa Clara County, California at the California State Fair in Sacramento, California, including views of the Santa Clara Valley region, Santa Cruz Mountains, and the Mission Church in Santa Cruz.

Yard ended his partnership with Hill along with his career as a professional photographer as he became more successful in exhibiting his watercolors and oil paintings in San Francisco, California. In 1883, he had a showing at the San Francisco Art Association's spring and winter exhibitions. In 1897 and 1898 his work showed at the winter exhibitions at the Mark Hopkins Institute of Art in San Francisco. That show included his watercolors, Coast Near Pacific Grove and In the Santa Cruz Mountains. Critic Lucy B. Jerome reviewed his work and said, "The delicate vernal greens and pale tints of the quiet pastorla scene impress one with the mellowness and ripeness of the painter's conception."

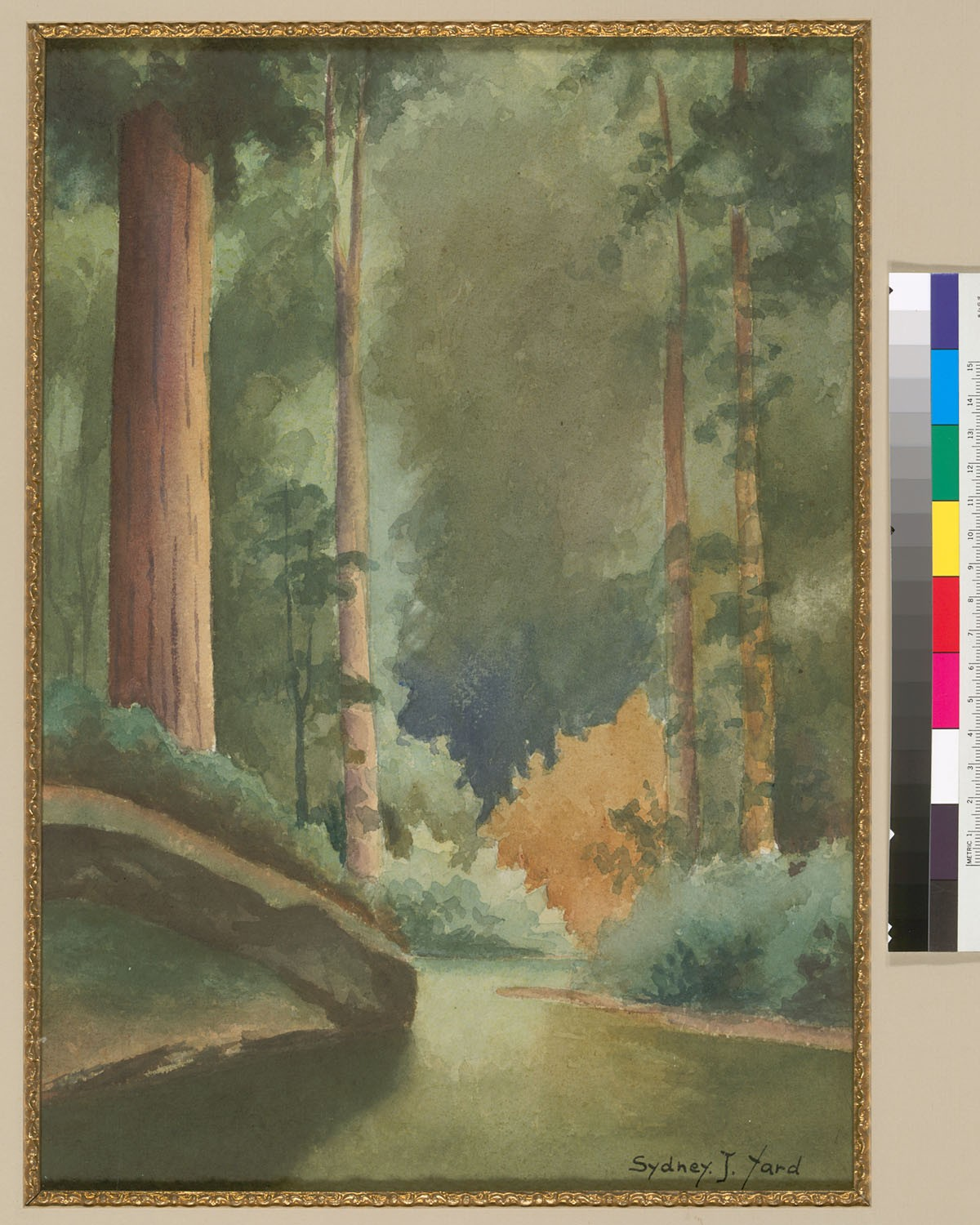
Forest and lake scene by Sydney J. Yard

Yard sold some of his works at the Schussler Galleries in San Francisco. While in San Francisco, Yard taught painters like Laura W. Maxwell, who later followed him to Carmel after he settled there.

By 1895, Yard had dissolved his partnership with Hill. In 1897, he opened his own art studio in San Jose.

In June 1899, Yard applied for a passport. He traveled to London, England and sketched landscapes in Scotland. Shortly after his return, in April 1900, Yard had a solo exhibition at the Vickery, Atkins & Torrey gallery in San Francisco. The San Francisco Call gave the following review:

"Yard has included in the present exhibition pictures done at home and abroad. A few show the coloring with which those who know anything of his work are familiar, but of the majority one has to make sure by looking at the signature, so far has Yard gotten from the path in which he had been traveling. It was a good one, but straight and a little narrow. His new pictures are simpler and broader and express the poetry of nature in some of her most cheerful and refreshing moods. This is so true of the bits of English and Welsh scenery he has done. One delicious stretch in Devonshire was scarcely hung until it was sold. Yard has taken for one subject “The Chalk Cliffs of Albion.” In it from the heights, which look as if they had been sculpted, stretches the ocean until it is lost in a blue haze. In several places he has used effectively this hazy perspective, which is so full of meaning."

Yard moved to Monterey, California in 1900. He painted watercolors of the sea, pine trees, and the rocky shores. In Pacific Grove, California he painted a scene of pine trees in shadows and sunlight. Yard continued to live and paint in San Jose until he moved to Oakland, California in 1904, and opened a studio in the Montgomery Block in San Francisco and began teaching. In Oakland he exhibited at the Oakland Art Fund in 1904. There he became friends with Mary DeNeale Morgan and Charles Chapel Judson. At the Oakland Art Fund, Yard displayed six paintings.

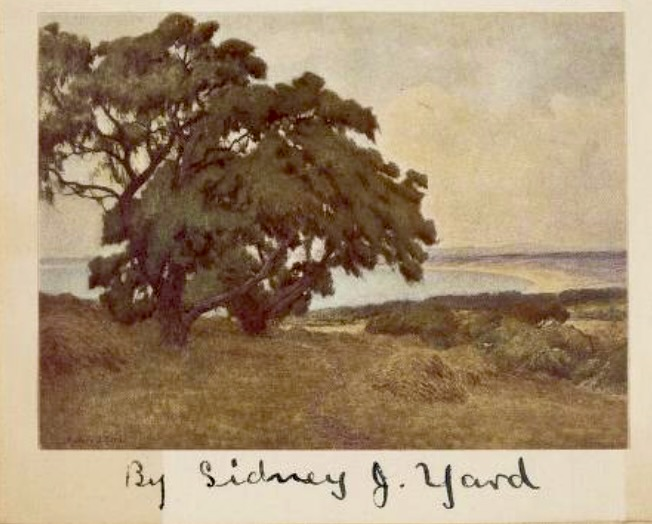
The Lone Oak, watercolor on board (ca. 1907)

In 1905, Yard relocated to the art colony of Carmel-by-the-Sea where he purchased a cottage. He survived the 1906 San Francisco earthquake. Yard's decision to move his studio in Carmel influenced artists like Laura W. Maxwell to follow suit. In 1908, Yard designed a larger house on Lincoln Street and 7th Avenue in Carmel. Michael J. Murphy (builder) built it. He later added an art studio, where he had regular showings. He showed his work at the Del Monte Art Gallery between 1907 and 1909. In 1908, Yard exhibited at the Hotel Del Monte, the Oakland Free Library and the Berkley Art Association. He was a member and curator for annual exhibitions at the Carmel Arts and Crafts Club.

Yard's last major show was at the Vickery, Atkins & Torrey in San Francisco in 1908. Critics said it was "the most important collection of Yard's work ever presented at one time."

== Techniques employed ==
Working in water color, Yard's style was one of detail with a focus on color harmony. Some painting techniques he used are layering, wet-on-wet, dry brush, and glazing. He captured the effects of natural light in his paintings, often depicting the same scene at different times of day.

== Works ==
- Sheep Grazing on California Hillside (1895)
- Sand Dunes and Trees
- Oak Tree (1896)
- The Close of Day (1896)
- Sketch From Penitencia Creek (1896)
- Hayfield, In the Santa Cruz Mountains (1897)
- Solitude (1897)
- Autumn Twilight (1898)
- Coast near Pacific Grove (1898)
- Cattle Pond (ca. 1898)
- The Chalk Cliffs of Albion (1900)
- A Foggy Morning (1902)
- Oaks and Sheep (1902)
- Brown October and Under the Old Oaks (1904)
- Cornfield of Marlowe (ca. 1904)
- Welch Landscape (ca. 1904)
- Cows In A California (1905)
- Stormy Weather (ca. 1905)
- The Rising Moon (1905)
- Morning in the Hills (1905)
- After the Rain (1905)
- California Oaks (1905)
- Oak Grove (1906)
- Marin Hills (1906)
- Moss Beach (1906)
- September Evening (ca. 1907)
- Unsettled Weather (ca. 1907)
- The Oak Tree (ca. 1907)
- The Downs (ca. 1907)
- Eucalyptus (ca. 1907)
- Sea Meadows-Carmel (ca. 1907)
- Early Morning in the Spring (ca. 1908)
- Trees and Shrubs in the Bright Light of Day (ca. 1908)
- The Monterey Coast (1909)
- Scene of Inverness (1909)
- Late Afternoon (1909)

== Death and legacy ==
Yard died on January 2, 1909, at age 54, in Carmel-by-the-Sea, from a heart attack on the steps of the Carmel Post Office.

After his death, his works were exhibited at the American Art Gallery in New York and the Alaska–Yukon–Pacific Exposition in Seattle. His watercolors continued to display at Vickery's, the Oakland's Orpheum Theatre, and the Gump's Gallery in San Francisco. The Rabjohn & Morcom gallery in San Francisco showed a group of his watercolors in his memory as did Vickery, Atkins & Torrey.

Yard's artworks form part of the collections at the San Diego Museum of Art and Cantor Arts Center at Stanford University. Additionally, his piece titled "Hills and Clouds" and will be displayed at the U.S. Embassy in Sweden.
