= Robert Moncrieff =

Robert Moncrieff may refer to:

- Robert Hope Moncrieff (1846–1927), Scottish author of children's fiction and of Black's Guides
- Robert Scott Moncrieff (1793–1869), Scottish advocate, illustrator and caricaturist
