= Carmel Club of Arts and Crafts =

Early Carmel arts club

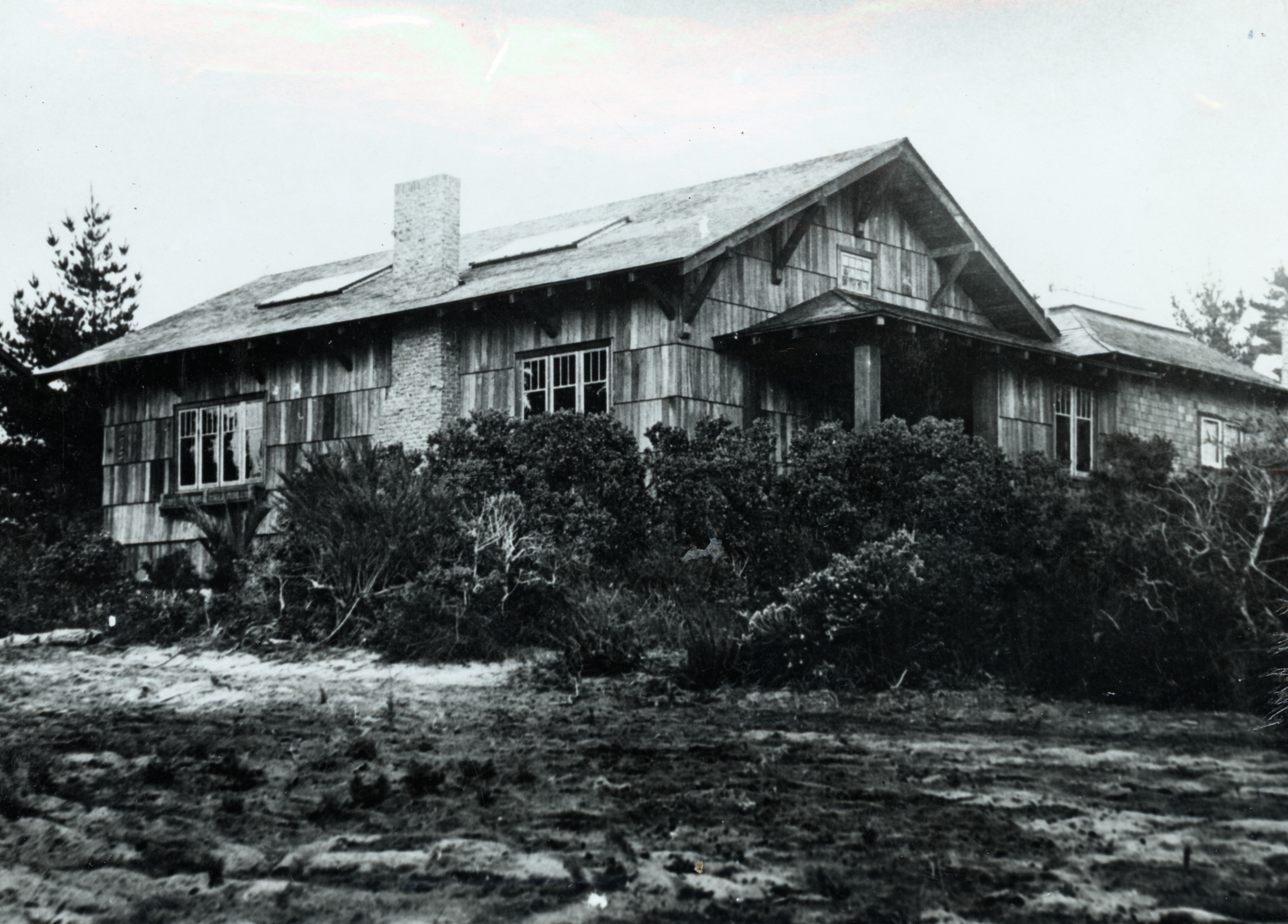
- Carmel Arts & Crafts Hall, 1907

- Location within Northern California
- Successor: Carmel Art Association
- Formation: 1905; 121 years ago
- Founder: Elsie Allen
- Founded at: Carmel-by-the-Sea
- Dissolved: 1927
- Type: Art Gallery, Club
- Purpose: To attract artists to Carmel
- Location: Carmel-by-the-Sea, California, United States
- Coordinates: 36°33′19″N 121°55′24″W
- Region served: Monterey County, California
- Services: Performances, poetry readings, lectures, and summer school

The Carmel Club of Arts and Crafts was an art gallery and theatre club founded in 1905, which soon built a clubhouse where artists and actors attracted to the arts colony village of Carmel-by-the-Sea, California, gathered. The club exhibited and taught art and produced performances at Forest Theater and the Golden Bough Playhouse. By 1927, the Carmel Art Association replaced the club as the center of art in Carmel, and in 1929, Edward G. Kuster purchased the club's theatrical operations.

== Early history ==
In 1905, to foster the arts in the village of Carmel-by-the-Sea, California, the Carmel Club of Arts and Crafts was formed by Elsie Allen, a former art instructor for Wellesley College. After the 1906 San Francisco earthquake, the village received an influx of artists and other creative people escaping the disaster area. Jack London describes the artists' colony in a portion of his novel, The Valley of the Moon. The early Carmel bohemians participated in events held at the club, including writers and poets Mary Austin, George Sterling, Robinson Jeffers and Sinclair Lewis.

In 1907, the Carmel Development Company provided the club with their first building on Casanova Street, the Arts and Crafts Hall. Their first art exhibit was held in this temporary building. Foster formed a committee to raise money to build a permanent site for a clubhouse. It raised money by holding a "Dutch Market" with booths to sell goods and food at the park across the Hotel Carmelo. Those in charge of the booths were George Sterling's wife, Sydney J. Yard's wife, Michael J. Murphy's wife, and others. Sinclair Lewis acted as master of ceremonies. By July 1907, a lot and the clubhouse building costing $2,500 was completed on Monte Verde Street south of Eighth Avenue. Every summer Jennie V. Cannon travelled to the Monterey Peninsula, and in 1907 purchased real estate in Carmel, where she joined the art colony, participated in its birth and development, and exhibited at the Carmel Club of Arts and Crafts.

Harold Sutton Palmer spoke at the club in March 1907 as well as musical selections by Mabel Gray Lachmund, Peral Tuttle, Sallie Ehrmann, and a reading by Fanny M. Yard, wife of watercolor artist Sydney J. Yard. Other early events included the Café-chantant and bazar to raise funds to pay for an art exhibition held at the clubhouse; entertainment for the Manzanita Club, which included music and dancing followed by dinner and speeches. On July 16, 1908, the first annual breakfast of the club was held at the clubhouse. George Sterling was toastmaster for thirty-two members of the club. Mary E. Hand was introduced as president of the club, which she held for sixteen years.

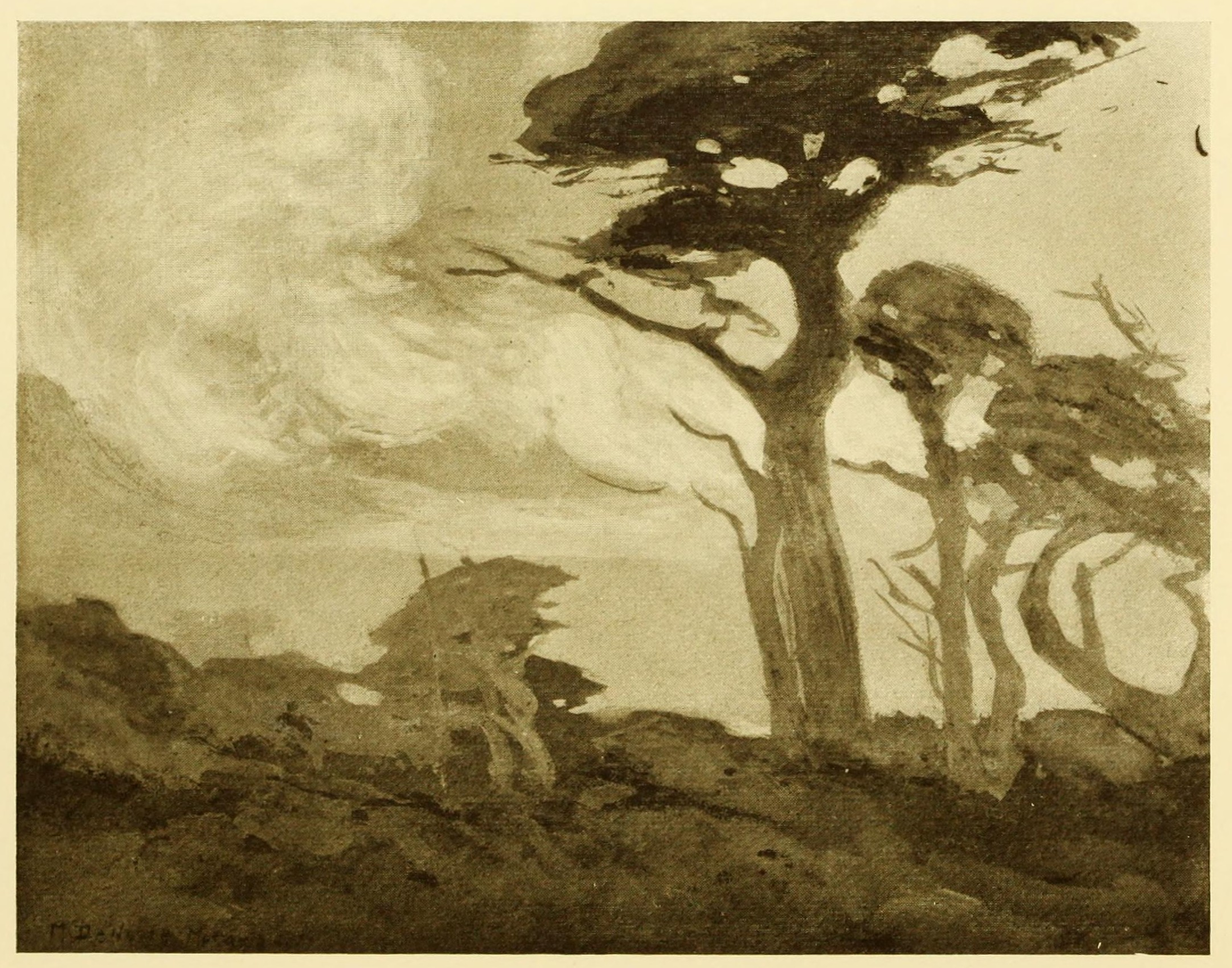
Cypress Trees by Mary DeNeale Morgan.

On September 24, 1911, the Club put on the play The Land of Heart's Desire, produced by Herbert Heron, at the Forest Theater amphitheater in Carmel. From July 4-5th 1916, the Club presented The Piper, by Josephine Preston Peabody at the Forest Theater. Four Carmel artists acted and painted scenery: Arthur Honywood Vachell, Mary DeNeale Morgan, William F. Ritschel, and Laura W. Maxwell. The dramas presented at the Club attracted considerable attention by 1914, with an article in The Clubwoman noting, "Probably no other women's club in the country has achieved a more remarkable success in the way of dramatic ventures than has The Carmel Club of Arts and Crafts". An article in The Mercury Herald commented, "a fever of activity seems to have seized the community and each newcomer is immediately inoculated and begins with great enthusiasm to do something ... with plays, studios and studies". The success of its productions allowed the club to buy the Forest Theater and the land from the Carmel Development Company in 1925.

=== Arts and Crafts Summer School of Art ===
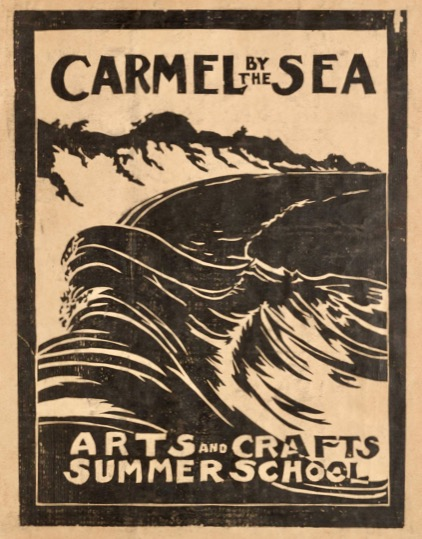
Carmel Summer School of Art.

By 1913, the Club had begun organizing lessons for aspiring painters, actors and craftsmen. American painters, such as William Merritt Chase, Xavier Martinez, Mary DeNeale Morgan and C. Chapel Judson offered six weeks of instruction for $15. From July through September 1914 William Merritt Chase taught his last summer class, his largest with over one hundred pupils, at the Summer School of Art.

By September 1927, the Carmel Art Association replaced the Summer School of Art and became the center of the art community on the Monterey Peninsula.

=== Arts and Crafts Theatre and last years ===
In 1923–1924 the club built a new theater, the Carmel Arts and Crafts Theatre, on an adjacent lot on Monte Verde Street, Carmel. In 1928, the Abalone League, a local amateur baseball club and active thespian group, bought the Arts and Crafts Theatre from the Club and renamed it the Abalone Theatre. The proceeds were used to pay off the Forest Theater's debts.

In 1929, after returning from a European trip, Edward G. Kuster was approached by the Abalone League which, beset by financial trouble, offered to sell Kuster its theatre operations, including the Arts and Crafts Theatre – an offer that Kuster accepted. Kuster remodeled the facility and renamed it the Studio Theatre of the Golden Bough. Having shut down his Golden Bough Theatre on Monte Verde Street, he moved all of his concerts, plays, lectures and other events there.

The Club continued to own the Forest Theater property, but this accumulated debt. The theater needed repairs, and in 1937 the Club deeded the property to the City of Carmel-by-the-Sea, which obtained WPA funds for major renovations.
