= Robert Hope Moncrieff =

Scottish author (1846–1927)

- Born: 26 February 1846; Edinburgh, Midlothian, Scotland
- Died: 10 August 1927 (aged 81); Middlesex, England
- Other name: Ascott R. Hope
- Occupation: Author
- Years active: 1864–1927
- Known for: Children's fiction and guidebooks
- Notable work: The world of to-day... in 6 volumes (1905)

Robert Hope Moncrieff (Note: Ascott was never part of his name, but was adopted by him as part of his pseudonym. It may have been a punning reference to his origin A Scot. He used the name A. R. Hope Moncrieff for some of his books for adults, including the semi-autobiographical A Book About Authors.) (26 February 1846 – 10 August 1927), known by the pen names A. R. Hope Moncreiff and Ascott R. Hope, was a prolific Scottish author of children's fiction and of Black's Guides.

== Early life ==
Robert Hope Moncrieff was born on 26 February 1846, the lawful son of George Moncrieff (11 May 1917 – 16 May 1865), a solicitor and his first wife Angela Birch (19 September 1820 – 25 December 1848). The couple had married the previous year in St Brides Church in Liverpool on 2 June 1845. Robert was quickly followed by a brother, John Forbes (5 July 1847 – 7 March 1927), and a sister, Angela Mary (27 November 1848 – 8 March 1864).

Moncrieff's mother, Angela, died of childbed fever four weeks after the birth of Angela Mary. Moncrieff was under three. His father married a second time on 27 June 1854 to Maria Wilks Williamson Rodgers (1830 – 30 March 1859) in Kilkenny, Ireland. (Note: The census shows that Maria Rodgers was born in Scotland. Her father was a staff officer, and presumably was posted to Ireland at the time.) The family now lived at No 7, Atholl Crescent (Note: The house is now occupied by the Perth Citizens' Advice Bureau.) in Perth. Maria gave George three more children: George Henry (2 November 1855 – 23 February 1947); Francis Edward (24 March 1857 – 7 January 1884); and Henrietta (14 June 1858 – 30 April 1859), who died in infancy. (Note: The cause of death was given as hydrocephalus on the register of deaths.)

Moncrieff's step-mother, Maria, died (Note: The death register gives the cause as consumption (this usually means what is now called Tuberculosis) of some twelve months duration.) when he was just 13, and his father married again before he was 15. His third wife was Isabella Roy (29 October 1828 – 18 January 1879) whom he married on 16 January 1861 in 2, Atholl Crescent. (Note: This house was occupied by Jane Hope Oliphant (31 July 1773 – 24 January 1861), the widow of a former officer of the East India Company. Mrs. Oliphant was rich, judging by the large number of servants she kept (housekeeper, cook, plus two female and two male servants), and generous, judging by her frequent subscriptions to good causes. Isabella's sisters, Margaret Isabel (14 October 1826 – 17 July 1879), and Mary Euphemia (5 April 1830 – 10 October 1866) were also married from this house. The house was sold for £3,225 in March 1861.) Perth, Scotland. Her father was not a soldier, but the Captain of a ship trading in Asia with the permission of the East India Company.

Moncrieff and his brother were in boarding school by the time their father married for the third time. The 1861 Census shows both Moncrieff (15) and his brother John (13) boarding at the Circus Place School in Edinburgh. This was a highly regarded school which prepared pupils for the Edinburgh Academy. Moncrieff went on to attend the Edinburgh Academy and then the University of Edinburgh.

Moncrieff's father died in 1865, (Note: The death register says that he died of consumption which he had suffered from for several years) four years after his third marriage. when Moncrieff was 19. Moncrieff wrote nearly fifty years later that his mother had died before he knew her and that: my father also was taken too soon, leaving me precociously independent. Not one of his father's three marriages lasted five years, all ending prematurely with the death of either wife or husband. Moncrieff himself never married.

== Writing ==
Before he was out of his teens, Moncrieff had written and made money by a real book. (Note: Moncrieff turned 20 in February 1866, so this book must have been published in 1864 or 1865. Oudendale: A story of schoolboy life is the most likely candidate, as the two other works dated for these years are a 24 page pamphlet for the Society for Promoting Christian Knowledge in 1864 and a book on school life in France in 1865. The Oxford Companion to Children's Literature (1991, p.259) describes the plot as follows: Charlie Campion, a pupil at Oudendale College, shows 'pluckiness' in standing up to bullies, but gets into bad company; he drinks and smokes, and causes grave anxiety to Dr. Eden the head master. He is rescued by the good effects of Confirmation – whereupon he falls off a cliff and dies a holy death. Oudendale: A story of schoolboy life at the HathiTrust Digital Library) While he attended the University of Edinburgh he wrote A book about Dominies (1867), Dominies being a term used for schoolmasters in Scotland. This was taken by a publisher, who published it at his own expense with a promise of profit to the author, which proved rather a mirage in the cold light of publishing accounts. (Note: Moncrieff never placed another book with that publisher.) It was published anonymously with no author's name given. The book was well reviewed and went into several editions. Moncrieff followed this up with A Book About Boys, (1868) adopting his pseudonym Ascott R. Hope for the first time. Moncrieff was ashamed of some of his early books and went to some expense to withdraw them from circulation.

Moncrieff says that he had have made awkward attempts at more than one handicraft, with the view of gathering straw for literary bricks. He was said to have taken up teaching briefly more with the purpose of studying schoolboys and their ways than to making it a profession.

Moncrieff travelled extensively. Even his census returns in the UK show how much he bounced around:

- 1851 – Living with his widowed father and two siblings in Perth. 5 years old.
- 1861 – At the Circus Place School in Edinburgh with his brother John.
- 1871 – An assistant master at Christ College, Brecon in Wales.
- 1881 – Boarding at 8, Victoria Grove, in Kensington, London. Profession now is Author.
- 1891 – Boarding at Hillside Boarding Lodge in Ventnor on the Isle of Wight. Profession is Author. The 13th edition of Black's Guide to the Isle of Wight, edited by Moncrieff, was published in 1895.
- 1901 – Now 55 years old. Moncrieff was no longer boarding, but was at the head of his own establishment at 85 Munster Road in Fulham, London. No relatives in the house, but the house also holds his 60-year-old housekeeper and her adult daughter. The electoral register show that he was still there in 1907.
- 1911 – Only occupant of 5 Chandos Road, Cricklewood, London, apart from a 52-year-old housekeeper.
- 1927 – On his death at 81 years-of-age he was living at 16a Addison Gardens, Kensington, London.

Moncrieff not only travelled the whole of Great Britain, but he also travelled internationally. He wrote: It has been by lot to be a good deal about the world from an early age. After a boyish visit to Paris, my travels began with a cruise in the Mediterranean and a stay in Italy, still heaving from Garibaldi's exploits. Moncrieff travelled, and visited four continents. He even tried his hand at farming in Canada, but soon abandoned it. All of his travels contributed not only to the background for his books, but also supported his books on geography and history. Moncrieff suffered from short-sightedness and this led him to favour occupations such as walking and riding. And these leisurely pursuits allowed him to make observations that he made use of when writing on topographical topics.

His study of the geography of the world, The world of to-day : a survey of the lands and peoples of the globe as seen in travel and commerce (1905) took him five years, and was updated every two years or so. Moncrieff wrote every word of the six volumes, bar a single page.

Moncrieff was a member of first the Savile and later of the Athenaeum. He was of a kindly nature and always ready to do good to others, but in a discreet way. He wrote that his work seldom brought him into contact with fellow authors, and that still less had he cultivated what is called smart society. His view of the world's affairs was mainly that of a looker-on. He wrote: I have lived my life in my own way, and that his writing was the sum of his accomplishments.

== Death ==
Moncrieff died at Eltham, London, England, on 10 August 1927. He was living at 16a Addison Gardens in Kensington, London at the time. He left an estate valued at £11,482 14s 6d. His half-brother George survived him by 20 years.

== Short stories and serials ==
Moncrieff contributed stories to numerous Boy's Papers and Magazines. He has stories in the first issues of the Boy's Own Paper and Union Jack. The following is a very incomplete list, drawn from Steve Holland's British Juvenile Story Papers and Pocket Libraries Index. Some of the stories, like Dick's Dog, later reappeared in books of stories by Moncrieff.

Serials and short stories in Boy's Papers by Moncrieff
No.	Order	Year		Title	Journal	Pt	Illustrator	Vol.	Iss.	Page	Length
1	1	1879	18 Jan	The Bogle	The Boy's Own Paper	1		1	1	7	2
2			25 Jan			2		1	2	27	1
3	2	1879	01 Feb	The Black Book	The Boy's Own Paper	1		1	3	34	3
4			08 Feb			2		1	4	54	3
5	3	1879	05 Apr	At the Masthead	The Boy's Own Paper	1		1	12	185	2
6			12 Apr			2		1	13	201	2
7			19 Apr			3		1	14	214	3
8	4	1879	19 Jul	Caught Out	The Boy's Own Paper	1		1	28	433	2
9			26 Jul			2		1	29	455	2
10	5	1880	01 Jan	The Magician's Apprentice; An Old Tale Retold	The Union Jack	1		1	1	14	2
11	6	1880	08 Jan	The Great Unknown; Or, The Adventures of Robbin, Bobbin, Watkin, And Pippin	The Union Jack	1		1	2	30	2
12			15 Jan			2		1	3	46	2
13			22 Jan			3		1	4	61	2
14			29 Jan			4		1	5	78	2
15	7	1880	01 Apr	Boots!; Or, The True Hero	The Union Jack	1	Horace Petherick	1	14	210	3
16	8	1882	07 Oct	The Troubles of a Dominie	The Boy's Own Paper	1		5	195	9	2
17			14 Oct			2		5	196	29	1
18	9	1883	28 Jul	The Tell-Tale; A School Story	The Boy's Own Paper	1		5	237	697	2
19			04 Aug			2		5	238	718	1
20			11 Aug			3		5	239	730	1
21			25 Aug			4		5	241	758	4
22			01 Sep			5		5	242	777	2
23			08 Sep			6		5	243	790	1
24	10	1886	23 Jan	Dick's Dog	The Boy's Own Paper	1		8	367	252	1
25			30 Jan			2		8	368	281	1
26	11	1886	24 Jul	Miss Molly Mick Mac	The Boy's Own Paper	1		8	393	681	1
27			31 Jul			2		8	394	692	1
28	12	1886	11 Sep	Boby Bounce	The Boy's Own Paper	1		8	400	794	1
29	13	1890	06 Sep	My Travels in Africa. From a Schoolboy's Journal	The Boy's Own Paper	1		12	608	777	2
30			13 Sep			2		12	609	791	2
31			20 Sep			3		12	610	806	1
32			27 Sep			4		12	611	817	2
33	14	1891	10 Oct	Well Caught! A Grammar School Story	The Boy's Own Paper	1		14	665	25	2
34	15	1892	06 Aug	Left Behind. A Story of Holiday Misfortunes	The Boy's Own Paper	1		14	708	714	2
35			13 Aug			2		14	709	729	2
36	16	1892	Xmas	The Good Old Times	The Boy's Own Paper	1		14	Xmas	5	3
37	17	1893	03 Jun	The Merry Swiss Boots	The Boy's Own Paper	1		15	751	565	2
38			10 Jun			2		15	752	581	2
39			17 Jun			3		15	753	598	2
40			24 Jun			4		15	754	613	2
41	18	1893	Summer	The Holiday Tiroler	The Boy's Own Paper	1		15	Summer	17	3
42	19	1894	09 Jun	The McKickshaws. An Old Boy's Recollections	The Boy's Own Paper	1		16	804	561	3
43			16 Jun			2		16	805	577	3
44			23 Jun			3		16	806	593	3
45			30 Jun			4		16	807	609	3
46			07 Jul			5		16	808	625	3
47			14 Jul			6		16	809	642	2
48	20	1894	04 Aug	An Adventure with the Apaches	The Boy's Own Paper	1		16	812	689	2
49			11 Aug			2		16	813	705	2
50			18 Aug			3		16	814	721	2
51	21	1894	06 Oct	Hard Up! A Story of Exmoor	The Boy's Own Paper	1		17	821	5	2
52			13 Oct			2		17	822	21	2
53			20 Oct			3		17	823	38	2
54			27 Oct			4		17	824	53	3
55			03 Nov			5		17	825	40	2
56			10 Nov			6		17	826	85	2

== Books other than Black's Guides ==
In the semi-autobiographical A Book About Authors (1914) Moncrieff wrote that: For more than forty years I have been an author of all work, what the contemptuous call a hack... His range was very broad and included:

- School stories for boys
- Serial stories in boy's papers
- Translations of works in other languages. Moncrieff says he spent his time when travelling learning other languages and translating works in them.
- Books about religion – including martyrdom and religious persecution
- Entertaining essays – about being a teacher, about school boys, etc.
- Encyclopedic and instructional works – about animals, history, or geography, etc.
- Black's Guides for tourists

This following section lists the guides that Moncrieff worked on, while this section lists books other than the guides.

Books written or translated by Moncrieff
Year	Title	Illustrator	Pages	Place	Publisher
1864	“Get thee behind me, Satan” : a story for boys		23 p., [1] leaf of plates : 1 ill.; 14 cm.	London	SPCK
1865	Oudendale: a story of schoolboy life		354 p. 19 cm.	London	William Mackingtosh
1865	The lycee boys : or, school life in France		151 p.; 17 cm.; ill.	Edinburgh	Oliphant & Co
1866	The martyr shepherd : a story of the Scottish Covenanters		158 p. : plates; 17 cm.	Edinburgh	Oliphant & Co
1866	Horace Hazelwood, or Little things and other tales (Title work by Moncrieff with contributions by various others)	William Small	viii, 328, 16 pages, 1 unnumbered leaf of plates : illustrations; 18 cm.	Edinburgh	Johnstone, Hunter, and Co
1867	A book about Dominies : being the reflections and recollections of a member of the profession		211p. + 24.	Edinburgh	W. P. Nimmo
1868	A book about boys, 2nd ed.		xii, 252 p. 18 cm.	Edinburgh	
1868	Stories of school life, 2nd ed.		xii, 439 p.; 8vo.	Edinburgh	W.P. Nimmo
1868	Mr. Leslie's stories		150, [4]p, plates; 17.3 cm.	Edinburgh	Oliphant, Anderson, & Ferrier
1869	A Book about Dominies ... 2nd ed.		vi, 248 pages; (8º)	Edinburgh	W. P. Nimmo
1870	Texts from the Times, etc.		xi, 252 p.; 19 cm.	Edinburgh	
1870	My schoolboy friends : a story of Whitminster Grammar School		354 p. : ill.; 19 cm.	London	W. P. Nimmo
1870	The exiles of France		159, [1]p, plates; 16.5 cm.	Edinburgh	Oliphant & Co
1871	Stories of French school life. [With plates.]		8vo.	Edinburgh	
1871	Stories about boys		viii, 271 p., [5] leaves of plates : illus.; 19 cm.	Edinburgh	W. P. Nimmo
1872	Master John Bull. A holiday book for parents and schoolmasters, etc.		(8º)	Edinburgh	
1873	Stories of Whitminster		312 p. : ill; 20 cm.	Edinburgh	W. P. Nimmo
1874	A Peck of Troubles. An account of certain misfortunes which happened to certain young people of Whitminster (Note: Given as Westminster in the catalogue, but examination of the original on Google Books shows that the name is Whitminster.)		(8º)	London	Sunday School Union
1874	Hope's annual. [by A.R.H. Moncrieff]		cm.18	Edinburgh	
1874	The night before the holidays : Hope's annual		vii, 205 p., [8] leaves of plates : ill.; 19 cm.	Edinburgh	W. P. Nimmo
1875	The holiday task : an occasional magazine of contributions by the pupils of Whitminster Grammar School and their friends	Gordon Browne	127, [8] p. : ill.; 19 cm.	London	W. P. Nimmo
1875	The day after the holidays	Gordon Browne	203 p., [8] leaves of plates : ill.; 19 cm.	London	W. P. Nimmo
1875	Famous historical scenes from three centuries : Pictures of celebrated events from the Reformation to the end of the French Revolution. Selected from the works of standard authors.		Add. engr. t.-pl, vii, [1], 600 p., frontis. plate; 23 cm.	London	W. P. Nimmo
1876	Round about the Minster Green; Stories of the boys and girls who lived there, etc.		(8º) ill	Edinburgh	
1876	'The Pampas' : a story of adventure in the Argentine Republic (Note: In A Book About Authors Moncrieff says that a fiction of his describing from materials supplied me the life of an Argentine settler, passed hardly doubted for fact (p.11))	Gordon Browne	viii, 312 p., [9] leaves of plates : 9 ill. (1 col.); 18 cm.	London	W. P. Nimmo
1877	The old tales of chivalry		xii, 276 p., [6] leaves of plates : ill.; 18 cm.	Edinburgh	Gall & Inglis
1877	The heroes of young America		ix, 318 p., [7] leaves of plates : ill., maps; 19 cm.	London	Edward Stanford
1878	The Young Rebels: a story of the Battle of Lexington		(8º) illust.	London	Sunday School Union
1878	George's enemies : a sequel to "My schoolboy friends"		312 pages, 4 leaves of plates : illustrations; 18 cm	London	W. P. Nimmo
1879	Buttons; : the narrative of the trials and travels of a young gentleman		[8], 232 p.; 17.5 cm.	London	Griffith & Farran
1880	The Men of the Backwoods; true stories and sketches of the Indians and the Indian Fighters ... Illustrated, etc.		(8º)	London	
1880	Seven stories about old folks and young ones. By A. R. H		293 pages; (8º)	London	Griffith & Farran
1880	Wonders of the volcano		128 p. : 10 ill.; 17 cm.	London	Gall & Inglis
1881	Stories of Young Adventurers ... With illustrations		380 pages; (8º)	London	John Hogg
1881	The Daughter of the Regiment. A story from My Grandmother's Journal, etc.	Charles Oliver Murray	148 pages; (8º)	London	Sunday School Union
1881	Stories of Long Ago [adapted from the “Gesta Romanorum,” etc.]. Retold by A. R. Hope ... With ... illustrations by Charles Oliver Murray, etc.	Charles Oliver Murray	xvi, 255 pages; (8º)	London	John Walker & Co
1881	Wonders of Electricity, etc.		128 pages; (8º); illust	London	Gall & Inglis
1882	A Book of Boyhoods, etc.		382 pages; (8º)	London	John Hogg
1882	Our Homemade Stories, etc.		346 pages; (8º)	London	John Hogg
1883	Kidnapped; or, Lewis Lloyd's Adventures in Virginia		128 pages; (8º)	London	Sunday School Union
1883	Evenings away from home : a modern miscellany of entertainment for young masters and misses	Gordon Browne	351p : ill; 18 cm.	London	John Hogg
1883	Stories of old renown : tales of knights and heroes	Gordon Browne	xvi, 286 p., [8] leaves of plates : ill.; 19 cm.	London	Blackie & son
1884	Stories out of school-time		vi, 343, 23 p. : ill.; 18 cm.	London	John Hogg
1884	The Wigwam and the War-Path: or, Tales of the Red Indians.	Gordon Browne	352 pages; (8º), [6] leaves of plates : ill.	London	Blackie & Son
1885	Stories of Wild Beasts, etc.		304 pages; (8º)	London	Gall & Inglis
1885	Wonders of the ice world		128 p., [1] leaf of plates : ill.; 17 cm.	London	Gall & Inglis
1885	Young days of authors		xiv, 380 p., [8] leaves of plates : ill.; 18 cm.	London	John Hogg
1885	Spindle stories : new yarns spun from old wool	Charles Oliver Murray	220 p., [6] leaves of plates : ill. (some col.); 20 cm.	London	G. Routledge & Sons
1886	'Dumps', and other stories, by Ascott R. Hope		cm.16	Edinburgh	
1886	A Handful of Stories	Charles Oliver Murray	128 pages; (8º)	London	CKS
1886	The Vulture's Nest and other stories (adapted ... from the German)		128 pages; (8º)	Edinburgh	W. P. Nimmo
1886	The hermit's apprentice	Gordon Browne	219 p. : ill.; 19 cm.	Edinburgh	W. P. Nimmo
1887	Dick's dog and other stories of country boys			Edinburgh	W. P. Nimmo
1887	Schoolboy Stories		vi, 248 pages; (8º)	Edinburgh	W. P. Nimmo
1887	Boy's own stories		vi, 360 pages; (8º); ill	London	T. Fisher Unwin
1887	The seven wise scholars	Gordon Browne	viii, 223, 32 p.; 21 cm.	London	Blackhill & Son
1887	Scenes from our century, selected from standard historians and other writers, by A.R.H. Moncrieff		vii, 442 p., [7] leaves of plates : ill.; 20 cm.	London	
1888	A Book of Bow-wows		36 pages; (oblong 8º); ill	London	Charles & Co
1888	Youngsters' yarns	Charles Oliver Murray	x, 372 p., [6] leaves of plates : ill.; 19 cm.	London	G. Routledge & Sons
1888	Romance of the mountains		vi, 376, 24 p., [12] leaves of plates : ill.; 20 cm.	London	John Hogg
1889	Dogs' delight		32 p.; 15 cm.	London	SPCK
1889	Phil's fortune		31 p.; 16 cm.	London	SPCK
1889	Playing at soldiers		32 p.; 16 cm.	London	SPCK
1889	The hermit and the herbs		31 p.; 16 cm.	London	SPCK
1889	Fred's Fun		16 pages; (8º)	London	CKS
1889	The Apprentice Prince		47 pages; (8º)	London	CKS
1889	The Scarecrow's Story		16 pages; (8º)	London	CKS
1889	An emigrant boy's story		128, 8 p., 1 p. of plates : ill.; 17 cm.	London	Blackie & Son
1889	Romance of the forests		xii, 336 p., [12] leaves of plates : ill.; 19 cm.	London	John Hogg
1890	The dream donkey		32p; 16 cm.	London	SPCK
1891	Redskin and Paleface. Romance and adventure of the Plains. ... With twelve illustrations		x. 338 pages; (8º)	London	John Hogg
1891	A string of stories	P. Hardy	160, [16] p. : 19 cm.	London	George Cauldwell
1891	A handful of stories		128 p. : ill.; 16.8 cm.	London	SPCK
1891	In forest and jungle; or, Adventures with wild beasts		304p,[8]leaves of plates ill 20 cm	London	Gall & Inglis
1892	My Schoolfellows		250 pages; (8º)	London	Biggs & Co
1892	The Lost Dog and other stories		128 pages; (8º)	London	Blackie & Son
1892	Stories by Ascott R. Hope [selected from his collections of short stories previously published]		xii, 447 pages; (8º)	London	A. & C. Black
1892	Stories, etc.		xii, 447 pages; (8º)	London	A. & C. Black
1892	Nutcracker and mouse king, and Educated cat by E. T. A. Hoffmann		viii, 198 p. : ill.; 17 cm.	London	T. Fisher Unwin
1892	Our stories		vi, 240, [8] p., [6] leaves of plates : ill.; 19 cm.	London	Biggs & Co
1892	Royal youths : a book of princehoods		[8], 355, [9] leaves of plates : ill., ports.; 21 cm.	London	T. Fisher Unwin
1893	Animal Adventures		124 pages; (8º)	Edinburgh	W. P. Nimmo
1893	Cap and Gown Comedy. A Schoolmaster's Stories		342 pages; (8º)	London	A. & C. Black
1893	Stories of the Wild West		246, 16 p., [6] leaves of plates : ill.; 20 cm.	Edinburgh	W. P. Nimmo
1893	The men of the backwoods: true stories and sketches of the Indians and the Indian fighters, New rev. ed.	Charles Oliver Murray	488, 32 p., [8] leaves of plates : ill.; 20 cm.	London	Griffith & Farran
1894	Heroes in homespun : scenes and stories from the American Emancipation movement		380, [4] p.; 8°	London	SPCK
1894	Toby : his experiences and opinions		iv, 151 p. : ill., frontis.; 16 cm.	London	A.D. Innes & Co
1895	Voyages en zigzag ... Selected, translated, and edited from Rodolphe Toepffer		127 p.		
1895	Ups and Downs; or, the Life of a Kite		80 pages; (8º)	London	CKS
1895	Walter's Feats. From the Swedish of Z. Topelius. Translated [from “Läsning för Barn”] by A. R. Hope		96 pages; (8º)	London	Blackie & Son
1895	Young Travellers' Tales, etc.	H. J. Draper	288 pages; (8º)	London	Blackie & Son
1896	Black and blue	Charles Oliver Murray	364 p. : ill.; 20 cm.	London	A. & C. Black
1896	The lad from London	Harold Copping	120, 32 p. : ill.; 18 cm.	London	John Hogg
1896	The story of the Indian Mutiny		243 p., 8 p. of plates : 8 ill.; 20 cm.	London	Frederick Warne and Co
1896	The white rat		16 p., [1] leaf of plates : ill.; 16 cm.	London	Blackie & Son
1896	On the war-path and other schoolboy stories		4 unnumbered pages, viii, 315 pages, 1 unnumbered page : illustrations; 19.0 cm	London	Gall & Inglis
1897	The Parish clerk		128p; 19 cm.	London	SPCK
1897	The Fire at the Farm		64 pages; (8º)	London	Dean & Son
1897	Half-Text History: chronicles of school life		vi, 336 pages; (8º)	London	A. & C. Black
1897	The Battle of Whistlebunkers and other stories		64 pages; (8º); ill	London	Dean & Son
1898	Hero and heroine, by Ascott R. Hope		cm.19	London	
1898	Mr. Dalton's prescription : and other stories		269, [3] p. : 14 ill.; 19 cm.	London	Sunday School Union
1899	Ready-Made Romance. Reminiscences of youthful adventure		358 pages; (8º)	London	A. & C. Black
1900	Precocious prodigies		p. 811-813; 8vo.	London	Religious Tract Society
1900	Sandy's secret		128, 16 p.; 19 cm.	Edinburgh	W. P. Nimmo
1900	Tales for Toby	W. Heath Robinson and S. Jacobs	x, 207 p. : ill.; 20 cm.	London	J. M. Dent & Co
1902	A midsummer carol	H. K. Robinson	96, [8] p. : ill.; 18 cm.	London	Ernest Nister
1904	Young head on old shoulders		179 p., [5] leaves of plates : ill.	London	Sunday School Union
1904	Stories	D. Furniss	xii, 447 p., [8] leaves of plates : 8 col. ill.; 20 cm.	London	A. & C. Black
1905	Die Ostereier by Johann Christoph von Schmid. Translated, abridged and edited.		52 p.		
1905	Die zwei Brüder by Jacob Grimm. Translated and edited.				
1905	The Schoolboy Abroad		308 pages; (8º)	London	A. & C. Black
1905	Wilful Willie		48 p. : ill.; 17 cm.	London	Blackie & Son
1905	Stories from Grimm (translated)		122 p. : ill.; 17 cm.	London	Blackie & Son
1905	Round the world		1 v. (unpaged) : ill.; 26 cm.	London	Blackie & Son
1905	The world of to-day : a survey of the lands and peoples of the globe as seen in travel and commerce		6 volumes : illustrations (some color); 26 cm	London	Gresham Pub. Co
1905	The adventures of Punch	S. Baghot-De la Bere	207 p., [12] leaves of plates : col. ill.; 22 cm.	London	A. & C. Black
1906	Heroes of European history		256 p., [13] leaves of plates : ill. (some col.); 20 cm.	London	
1907	Dramas in Duodecimo: abstracts and brief chronicles of youth		vi. 319 pages; (8º)	London	A. & C. Black
1908	The world		viii,184p.,37 leaves of plates : ill.(some col.),1 folded map; 20 cm.	London	A. & C. Black
1909	Adventurers in America	Henry Sandham	ix, 355p : 12 f.p. col. ill ; 21 cm.	London	A. & C. Black
1909	Seeing the world : the adventures of a young mountaineer	Gordon Browne	296 p., [5] leaves of plates : 5 col. ill.; 22 cm.	London	Wells Gardner, Darton
1909	Beasts of business	George Vernon Stokes	viii, 244 p., [8] leaves of plates : col. ill., frontis.; 21 cm.	London	A. & C. Black
1910	Fifty-Two Stories of Classic Heroes ... Edited by Francis Storr	Frank C. Papé	400 pages; (8º)	London	Griffith & Farran
1912	Stories of Wild Beasts and their curious traits ... With illustrations		304 pages; (8º)	London	Gall & Inglis
1912	Romance and legend of chivalry		xii, 439 p. : ill., plates (some col.); 22 cm.	London	Gresham Pub. Co
1912	Classic myth and legend		xvi, 443 p., 48 p. of plates (some col.) : ill.; 22 cm.	London	Gresham Pub. Co
1913	Heroes of the European Nations. [Another edition of “Heroes of European History.” With illustrations.]		vii, 194 p.		
1913	Leaders & Landmarks in European History, from early to modern times. By A. R. Hope Moncrieff ... & the Rev. H. J. Chaytor, etc. [With plates and maps.]		4 volumes; (8º)	London	Gresham Pub. Co
1913	Half and Half Tragedy. Scenes in black and white		vi, 340 pages; (8º)	London	A. & C. Black
1914	A book about authors : reflections and recollections of a book		vii, 308 p.; 21 cm.	London	A. & C. Black
1915	The School of Arms: stories of boy soldiers and sailors		viii, 335 pages; (8º)	London	G. Routledge & Sons
1916	The home story book: with George Manville Fenn		107 p.; 4to.	London	
1918	Holiday Adventures ... New edition [of “An Album of Adventures”], etc.		332 pages; (8º)	London	A. & C. Black
1918	The adventures of two runaways	T. M. R. Whitwell	352 p., [8] leaves of plates : ill.; 20 cm.	London	A. & C. Black
1919	The McKickshaws at School ... With ... illustrations, etc. (First published as “Half-Text History.”)		336 pages; (8º)	London	A. & C. Black
1919	Schoolboys of other lands	Walter Paget	[iv], 308 p., [8] leaves of plates (incl. front.) : ill.; 20 cm.	London	A. & C. Black
1920	The New World of To-Day ... With economic data supplied by Lionel W. Lyde ... and a series of maps. [Illustrated.]	L. W. Lyde	(8º)	London	Gresham Pub. Co
1920	Chieftain and chum : the story of a Highland holiday	Allan Stewart	vi, 308 p., [8] leaves of plates : ill.; 20 cm.	London	A. & C. Black
1922	The fairy Christmas-boxes		1 v.; 16 cm.	London	SPCK
1922	The home service : a household history		320 p.; 19 cm.	London	Selwyn & Blount
1923	Heroines of European history		191 p., [9] p. of plates : ill.; 19 cm.	London	Gresham Pub. Co
1924	Boys of Whitminster		312 p.; 19 cm.	London	Sampson Low, Marston
1924	Redskins and settlers : stories of the wild west		248, 16 p.; 19 cm.	London	Sampson Low, Marston
1924	The truant from school : an adventure in the backwoods		282 p., [8] leaves of plates : 8 ill.; 19 cm.	London	Sampson Low, Marston
1924	The rise of the British Empire		192 p., [16] plates : ill., plates, ports; 22 cm.	London	Blackie & Son
1925	A book about schools, schoolboys, schoolmasters and schoolbooks		vii, 312 p; 23 cm.	London	A. & C. Black
1926	The adventures of lazybones		62p; 16 cm.	London	SPCK
1927	Comedies of Error. A book about ourselves		vii, 304 pages; (8º)	London	A. & C. Black
1928	Robert Hope Moncrieff: a memorial volume, etc. [Papers intended for a projected book “Romances of America.” With a portrait.]		xx, 156 pages; (8º); portrait frontispiece	London	Printed for private circulation
1929	Are ministerial missionaries needed?		25 p.; 18 cm.	Shanghai	Presbyterian Mission Press

== Black's Guides ==
Adam and Charles Black published an extensive series of guides known as Black's Guides, as well as illustrated books describing different localities. Although Moncrieff is usually credited as the editor, the work was more involved than the term editor would suggest. Moncrieff said: I have edited, that is mainly written, or re-written, some dozens of guide-books, most of them appearing in successive editions. The list of those which could be found in searches on the Jisc Library Hub Discover, which aggregates catalogues for academic libraries, and libraries of record in the UK and Ireland. The differences between the editions were not trivial, and sometimes involved a complete rewrite. The more popular books were revised more often than the less popular books, as changes in railways, towns and cities, and in hotels and attractions brought the need for new editions. The table below is not exhaustive as not all of the different editions are held in the libraries.

The guides fall into two broad categories:

- Books with a great deal of colour illustration with notes, such as Bonnie Scotland (1904), later republished as Scotland (1922). This had 75 leaves of colour illustrations from paintings by Harold Sutton Palmer. The notes did not so much describe the views painted, but put them in a historical and literary context, together with railway directions.
- The Guides proper: Books that serve as tour guides, with maps, and accounts of places of interest, and journeys, be they on foot along the coast, or by rail or road.

Guide books written or edited by Robert Hope Moncrieff for Adam and Charles Black Limited
Year	Title	Edition	Illustrator	Pages
1892	Where shall we go? A guide to the watering-places and health resorts of England, Scotland, Ireland, and Wales.	12th ed.		pp. xxv, 348: plates; maps.; 17 cm.
1893	Where to go Abroad. A guide to the watering-places and health resorts of Europe, the Mediterranean, etc. [With map.]			xxii. 466 pages; (8º)
1895	Black's Guide to the Isle of Wight including sailing directions for the Solent	13th ed.	Maps by Walker and Boutall	viii, 122p. maps; sm.8vo.
1895	Black's guide to Devonshire	15th ed.		232 p., [10] leaves & [2] folded leaves of plates : maps; 17 cm.
1895	Black's guide to Cornwall	16th ed.		x, 186 p., [8] leaves of plates : maps; 17 cm.
1896	Black's guide to Bournemouth and the New Forest			71 p., [3] folded leaves : maps; 17 cm.
1896	Black's guide to Leamington, Warwick, Stratford-on-Avon, Kenilworth & Coventry	8th ed.		82, 128, [2] p., [5] leaves of plates (some folded) : ill., maps; 17 cm.
1896	Black's guide to the county of Sussex and its watering places	10th ed.		200,128p, [10]leaves of plates(6 fold) : ill, maps, plans; 17 cm.
1896	Black's guide to the English Lakes	22nd ed.		x, 223 p., [11] leaves & [8] folded leaves of plates : ill., maps; 17 cm.
1896	Black's guide to Edinburgh	24th ed.		[8],110,[2],128p, 3 (fold)plates : illus, maps, plans; 17.2 cm.
1897	Black's guide to Bath and Bristol, Clifton, Wells, Glastonbury etc.	6th ed.		87 p., [4] leaves & [1] folded leaf of plates : maps; 17 cm.
1897	Black's guide to Dorset, Salisbury, Stonehenge, etc.	14th ed.		vi, 132 p., [1] leaf & [1] folded leaf of plates : map, plan; 17 cm.
1897	Black's guide to Hampshire	13th ed.		xii, 184 p.; 17 cm.
1898	Black's guide to Matlock, Dovedale and central Derbyshire			76 p., [4] leaves & [2] folded leaves of plates : ill., maps; 17 cm.
1898	Black's guide to Bournemouth and the New Forest	2nd ed.		iv, 71 p., [3] folded leaves : maps; 17 cm.
1898	Black's Guide to Surrey	5th ed.		vi, 184 p., [4] folded leaves : maps; 17 cm.
1898	Black's guide to Buxton and the peak country of Derbyshire	9th ed.		87 p., [2] leaves & [3] folded leaves of plates : maps; 17 cm.
1898	Black's shilling guide to Scotland	10th ed.		143 p., [2] leaves & [1] folded leaf of plates : maps; 17 cm.
1898	Black's guide to Sussex and its watering-places	11th ed.		200 p., [7] folded leaves : maps; 17 cm.
1898	Black's guide to the county of Sussex and its watering places	11th ed.		200,132p, [9]leaves of plates(7 fold) : ill, maps, plans; 17 cm.
1898	Black's guide to Brighton and its environs	12th ed.		95 p., [1] leaf & [1] folded leaf of plates : maps; 17 cm.
1898	Black's guide to Devonshire	16th ed.		232 p., [10] leaves & [2] folded leaves of plates : maps; 17 cm.
1898	Black's guide to Cornwall	17th ed.		x, 186 p., [9] leaves of plates : maps; 17 cm.
1899	Black's guide to Hastings & Eastbourne, St Leonards, Bexhill, Rye, Winchelsea, etc.			88 p., [2] leaves & [4] folded leaves of plates : maps; 17 cm.
1899	Black's guide to Harrogate	11th ed.		88 p., [4] folded leaves : maps, plans; 17 cm.
1899	Black's guide to the Isle of Wight : including sailing directions for the Solent	14th ed.		vi, 122, 132 p., [8] leaves of plates : maps; 17 cm.
1899	Black's guide to Scarborough & Whitby, Filey, Bridlington, Saltburn, Eskdale, etc.	19th ed.		88 p., [5] leaves & [3] folded leaves of plates : maps; 17 cm.
1899	Black's guide to Edinburgh	25th ed.		110 p., [1] leaf & [2] folded leaves of plates : ill., maps, plans; 17 cm.
1899	Blacks guide to Somerset	15th ed.		xvi, 231, [1], 132 p. : maps (fold., col.); 8vo.
1900	Black's guide to the Wye			120 p., [3] leaves of plates : maps; 17 cm.
1900	Black's guide to Manchester	11th ed.		84 p., [2] folded leaves of plates : maps; 17 cm.
1900	Black's guide to the English Lakes	23rd ed.		x, 223 p., [11] leaves & [8] folded leaves of plates : ill., maps; 17 cm.
1901	Black's guide to West Kent : Tunbridge Wells, Maidstone, Rochester, etc.			viii, 120 p., [8] leaves of plates, [5] folded leaves : ill., maps; 17 cm.
1901	Black's guide around London			vi, 88 p., [5] leaves & [1] folded leaf of plates : maps; 17 cm.
1901	Black's guide to Surrey	6th ed.		vii, 184,128p : maps(col, fold)
1901	Black's guide to Cornwall	18th ed.		x, 132 p. : ill., maps (1 folded), plans, plates; 17 cm.
1901	Black's guide to the Trossachs, Loch Katrine, Loch Lomond, etc.	25th ed.		viii, 92 p., [2] folded leaves : ill., maps; 17 cm.
1902	Black's guide to Exeter and East Devon : Seaton, Sidmouth, Exmouth, etc.			76 p., [6] leaves & [3] folded leaves of plates : ill., maps; 17 cm.
1902	Black's guide around London			viii, p. 86-156, [4] leaves & [1] folded leaves of maps : maps; 17 cm.
1902	Black's guide to Bournemouth and the New Forest	4th ed.		iv, 71 p., [3] folded leaves : maps; 17 cm.
1902	Black's guide to Leamington, Warwick, Stratford-on-Avon, Kenilworth & Coventry	9th ed.		82 p., [7] leaves & [2] folded leaves of plates : ill., maps; 17 cm.
1902	Black's guide to Sussex and its watering-places	12th ed.		208 p., [5] leaves & [7] folded leaves of plates : ill., maps; 17 cm.
1902	Black's Guide to Dorset, Salisbury, Stonehenge etc.	15th ed.		vi, 132 p., [7] leaves & [4] folded leaves of plates : ill., maps; 17 cm.
1902	Black's guide to Devonshire	17th ed.		xix, 243 p. : ill., maps (part folded), folded plan; 17 cm.
1903	Around London : Black's guide to the environs for twenty miles			viii, 248 p., [4] leaves & [6] folded leaves of plates : maps; 17 cm.
1903	Black's guide to Manchester	12th ed.		84 p., [3] leaves & [2] folded leaves of plates : ill., maps; 17 cm.
1903	Black's guide to Edinburgh	26th ed.		110 p., [8] leaves & [2] folded leaves of plates : ill., maps, plans; 17 cm.
1904	Black's guide to Sherwood Forest and South Derbyshire			iv, 60 p., [5] leaves & [2] folded leaves of plates : ill., maps; 17 cm.
1904	Bonnie Scotland		Sutton Palmer	xi, 254 p., [75] leaves of plates : col. ill.; 23 cm.
1904	Black's guide to Somerset	2nd ed.		xvi, 231,114p, [6]plates : ill, maps(4 fold); 17 cm.
1904	Black's guide to Buxton and the Peak country of Derbyshire	10th ed.		87, 114 p. : ill., maps; 17 cm.
1904	Black's guide to Derbyshire with Sherwood Forest	18th ed.		x, 78, 58, 56, iv p., [17] leaves & [3] folded leaves of plates : ill., maps; 17 cm.
1904	Black's guide to Hampshire : Bournemouth, New Forest, Winchester, Southampton, Portsmouth, etc.	15th ed.		vi,188;112p., leaves of plates : ill.., maps; 17 cm.
1905	Black's guide to Surrey	7th ed.		vi, 184 p., [5] leaves of plates, [4] folded leaves : ill., maps; 17 cm.
1905	Black's guide to Sussex and its watering-places	13th ed.		208 p., [8] leaves & [7] folded leaves of plates : ill., maps; 17 cm.
1906	The Highlands and Islands of Scotland		William Smith Jr.	x, 231, 1 page, 40 col. preliminary leaves (incl. frontispiece) : folded map; 23 cm.
1906	Black's guide to West Kent : Tunbridge Wells, Maidstone, Rochester, etc.	2nd ed.		viii, 120 p., [8] leaves of plates, [6] folded leaves : ill., maps; 17 cm.
1906	Black's guide to Devonshire	18th ed.		xix, 243 pages : frontispiece, plates, maps (some folded) folded plan; 17 cm.
1906	Surrey	1st ed.	Sutton Palmer	xi, 252 p : plates, fold. map; 23 cm.
1907	Middlesex		John Fulleylove	ix, 159 p., [20] leaves of plates, [1] folded leaf of plates : ill., maps; 23 cm.
1907	Black's guide to Dorset, Salisbury, Stonehenge, etc.	16th ed.		vi, 136 p., [7] leaves & [4] folded leaves of plates : ill., maps; 17 cm.
1907	Black's guide to Cornwall	20th ed.		x, 188 p., [16] leaves of plates : ill., maps; 17 cm.
1908	Isle of Wight		Alfred Heaton Cooper	viii, 175 p., [24] leaves of plates : ill.; 23 cm. + folded maps.
1908	The Peak country		W. Biscombe Gardner	xii, 182, [2] p., 24 leaves of plates : col. ill.; 20 cm.
1908	Kew Gardens		Thomas Mower Martin	x, 208 p. : frontispiece, [23] col. plates; 21 cm.
1908	Black's guide to Bath and Bristol, Clifton, Wells, Glastonbury, etc.	9th ed		87 p. : 1 ill., maps
1909	Essex		Louis Burleigh Bruhl	xii, 26l, 1 p. : 75 col. pl. (incl. front., fold. map); 23 cm.
1909	The heart of Scotland		Sutton Palmer	x, 205 [1] p. : 24 col. pl. (incl.front.) fold. map.; 26 cm.
1909	Black's guide to West Kent : Tunbridge Wells, Maidstone, Rochester, etc.	3rd ed.		viii, 120 p., [8] leaves of plates, [6] folded leaves : ill., maps; 17 cm.
1909	Black's guide to Surrey	8th ed.		vi, 184 p., [4] leaves of plates & [4] folded leaves : ill., maps; 17 cm.
1910	Black's guide to Devonshire	18th ed.		xix, 243 p. : ill.; 17 cm.
1911	Black's guide to Exeter and East Devon : Seaton, Sidmouth, Exmouth, etc.	2nd ed.		74,96p : ill, maps(2 fold), fold.plan; 17 cm.
1911	Black's guide to Sussex and its watering-places	14th ed.		208, 88 p., [20] leaves of plates (7 fold.) : ill., col. maps (1 fold. in pocket); 17 cm.
1911	Black's guide to the county of Sussex and its watering places	14th ed.		208,96p, [17]leaves of plates(7 fold) : ill, maps, plan; 17 cm.
1911	Black's guide to Devonshire	19th ed.		xix, 243, 88 p. : ill., maps
1911	Black's guide to Cornwall	21st ed.		x, 188 p., [16] leaves of plates : ill., maps; 17 cm.
1913	Black's guide to Hampshire: Bournemouth, New Forest, Winchester, Southampton, Portsmouth, etc.	17th ed.		8vo.
1915	Black's guide to Dorset, Salisbury, Stonehenge, etc.	17th ed.		vi, 136p, [8]plates : ill, maps(5 fold), plan; 17 cm.
1919	Black's guide to Cornwall	22nd ed.		188p.
1920	The cockpit of Europe			xii, 210 p : 32 col. plates, fold. map; 23 cm.
1921	Black's guide to Dorset, Salisbury, Stonehenge, etc.	18th ed.		vi, 136 p., [5] leaves & [5] folded leaves of plates : ill., maps; 17 cm.
1921	Black's guide to Devonshire	20th ed.		xv, 243 p. : ill.; 17 cm.
1922	Scotland (2nd ed. of Bonnie Scotland)		Sutton Palmer	xi, [1], 259, [1] p. col. front., col. plates, illus. (map) 21 cm
1925	Highlands and islands of Scotland	2d ed.	William Smith Jnr.	xi, 234 p., 32 leaves of plates : ill., map.; 21 cm.
1926	Black's guide to Dorset, Salisbury, Stonehenge, etc.	19th ed.		vi, 136,36p, [3]plates : ill, maps(6 fold), plan; 17 cm.
1926	Essex	Rev. ed.	Louis Burleigh Bruhl	ix, 261 p., [32] leaves of plates : ill.; 22 cm.
1927	Derbyshire		W. Biscombe Gardner, W. Heaton Cooper	vii, [1], 239 p. col. front., illus. (map) col. plates. 21 cm
