= Charles Chapel =

Charles Chapel may refer to:

== People ==
- Charles Edward Chapel (1904–1967), American politician and technical writer
- Charles Chapel Judson (1864–1946), American painter and educator

== Churches ==
- Charles Chapel, Plymouth, in Plymouth, Devon, England
- Charles Ilfeld Memorial Chapel, in Las Vegas, New Mexico, U.S.
- St. Charles Chapel, an early structure in the history of St. Charles Borromeo Church in Destrehan, Louisiana, U.S.
