= Mary DeNeale Morgan =

American painter (1868–1948)

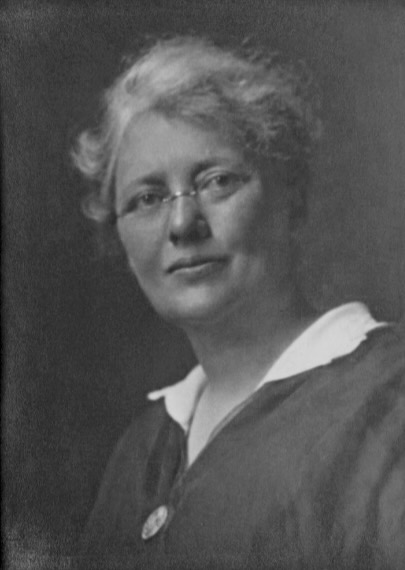
- DeNeale Morgan ca. 1924.
- Born: May 24, 1868; San Francisco, California, US
- Died: October 10, 1948 (aged 80); Carmel-by-the-Sea, California, US
- Known for: Painting, drawing

Mary DeNeale Morgan (May 24, 1868 – October 10, 1948) also known as M. DeNeale Morgan, was an American plein air painter, especially in watercolor, and printmaker. She was the director the Carmel Summer School of Art sponsored by the Carmel Arts and Crafts Club and a founding member of the Carmel Art Association (CAA) in Carmel-by-the-Sea, California.

== Early life ==
A native of San Francisco, Morgan was the second of seven children; her mother's parents, Thomas Wolfe Morgan (1839-1903) and Cristina Agnes Ross (1847-1922), had emigrated to California from Scotland in the 1850s. She grew up in Oakland, where her father was city engineer for some years. Her brother, architect Thomas W. Morgan, came to Carmel in 1920 to join his sister. Thomas Morgan was a resident of Carmel-by-the-Sea for 20 years working on architectural designs for homes and buildings.

At age eighteen, she entered the San Francisco Art Institute's California School of Design (CSD), where she studied with Virgil Macey Williams, painter and director at CSD. She took some instruction with William Keith, a family friend, of whom she has been called a favorite pupil.

== Career ==
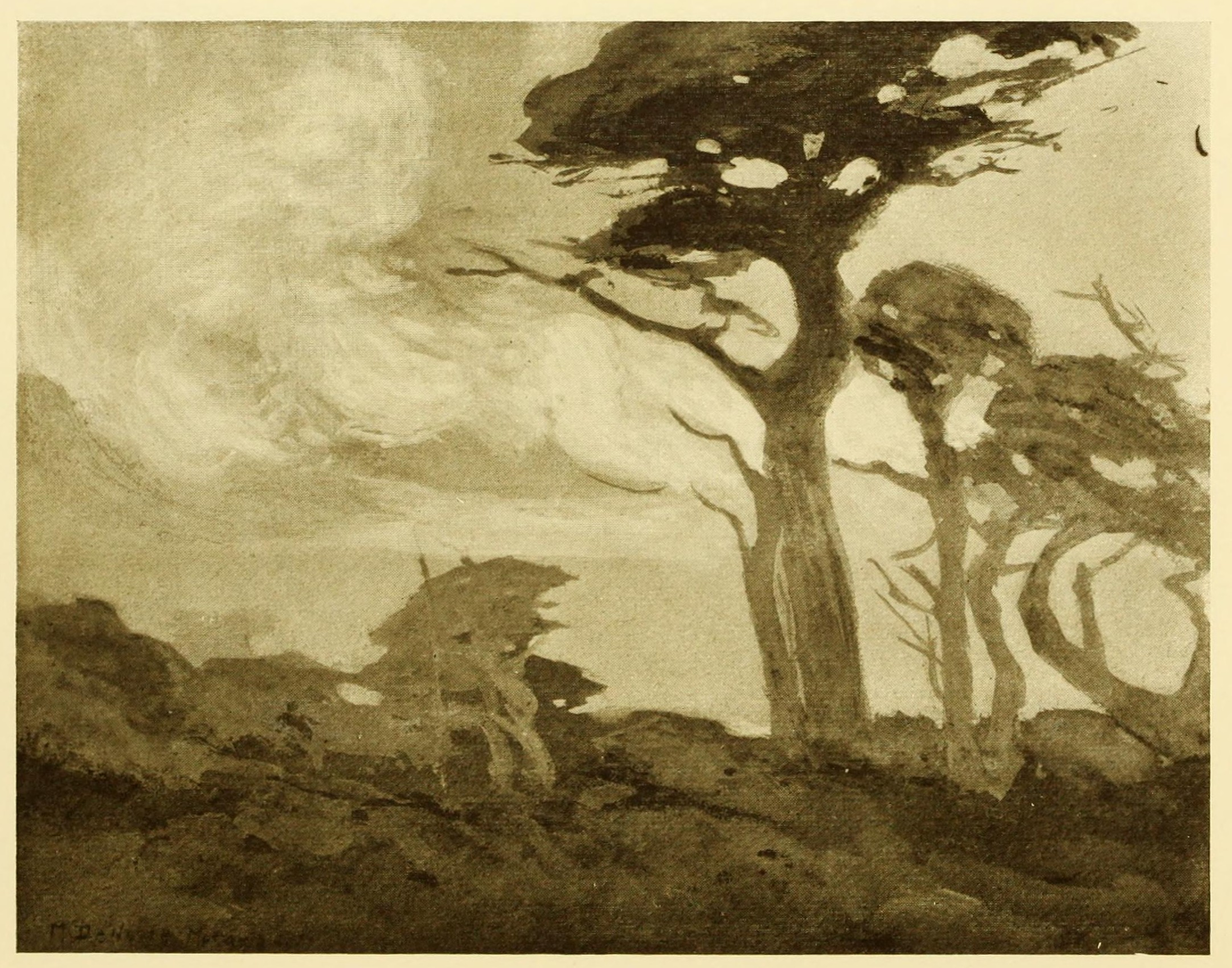
Cypress Trees - Gray Day

Morgan opened a studio in Oakland in 1896, and for a short while also taught art at Oakland High School. In 1907, she had her first solo exhibition, at the Hahn Gallery in Oakland.

In 1903, Morgan came to Carmel-by-the-Sea before purchasing a home and studio in 1909 from watercolorist Sydney Yard, located on Lincoln near Seventh Street. She was the first artist to sell a painting when the Hotel Del Monte gallery opened in 1907. Her favorite subject was the Monterey cypresses.

In 1914 she took classes with William Merritt Chase when he came to the town for the summer, at her instigation. In 1915, she won a silver medal at the Panama–Pacific International Exposition in San Francisco. From 1917 to 1925 she directed the Carmel Summer School of Art sponsored by the Carmel Arts and Crafts Club. She was among the founders of the Carmel Art Association. In 1928 she was recognized by Scribner's for her work. During World War II she traveled weekly to Fort Ord to sketch some of the men stationed there.

Genial, prominent in village doings, a steadfast painter in tempora and oils. Her cypress trees are famous, her fine exhibits many and splendid. For years instructor of young artists in Carmel Summer School of Art.

— Carmel Pine Cone

== Death ==
Morgan died of a heart attack on October 10, 1948, at age 80, in Carmel-by-the-Sea. She was at Point Lobos painting a cypress four days before her death. She never married.

== Legacy ==
Among the museums and institutions holding examples of her work are the Los Angeles County Museum of Art; the San Francisco Art Association; the University of California, Berkeley; the University of Southern California; and the University of Texas at Austin.

== Selected works ==
- Cypress Trees - Gray Day
- Cypress, 17 Mile Drive Near Fanshell Beach

== See also ==
- Watercolor painting
