= Charles Oliver Murray =

Scottish artist and printmaker (1842–1923)

Charles Oliver Murray (1 September 1842 – 11 December 1923) was a Scottish artist and printmaker.

Born in the village of Denholm in Roxburghshire in 1842, Murray trained at the Trustees' Academy in Edinburgh and moved to London by 1872. He was elected a Fellow of the Society of Painter-Etchers on 7 May 1881. He had his work published widely in both The Portfolio and The Art Journal from the 1870s onwards, and frequently exhibited at the Royal Academy from 1872 onwards.

Murray died in London on 11 December 1923. He is buried in the Ladywell Cemetery in south-east London.

== Works ==
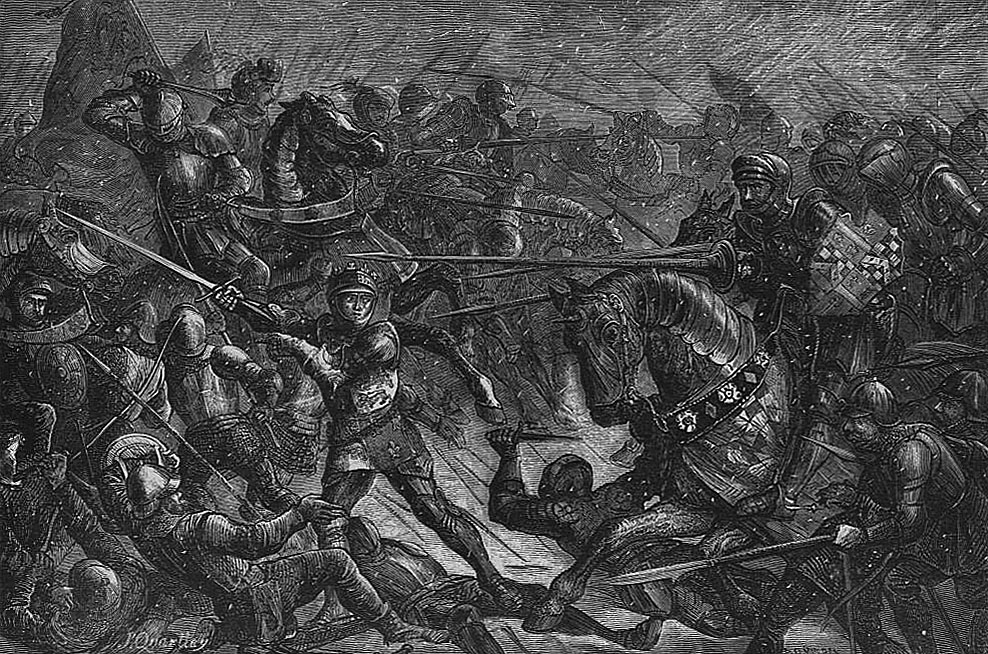
Murray's engraving of John Quartley's Battle of Towton

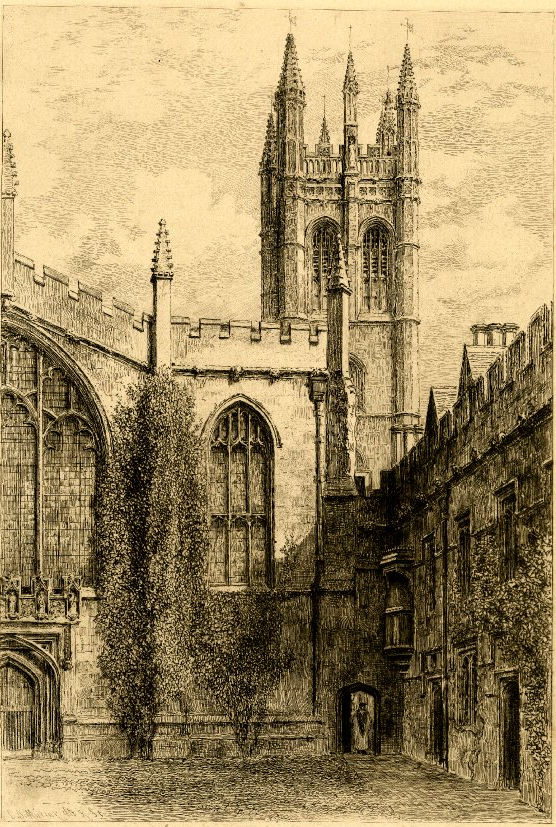
Magdalen College Oxford
