= Alfred-Louis Brunet-Debaines =

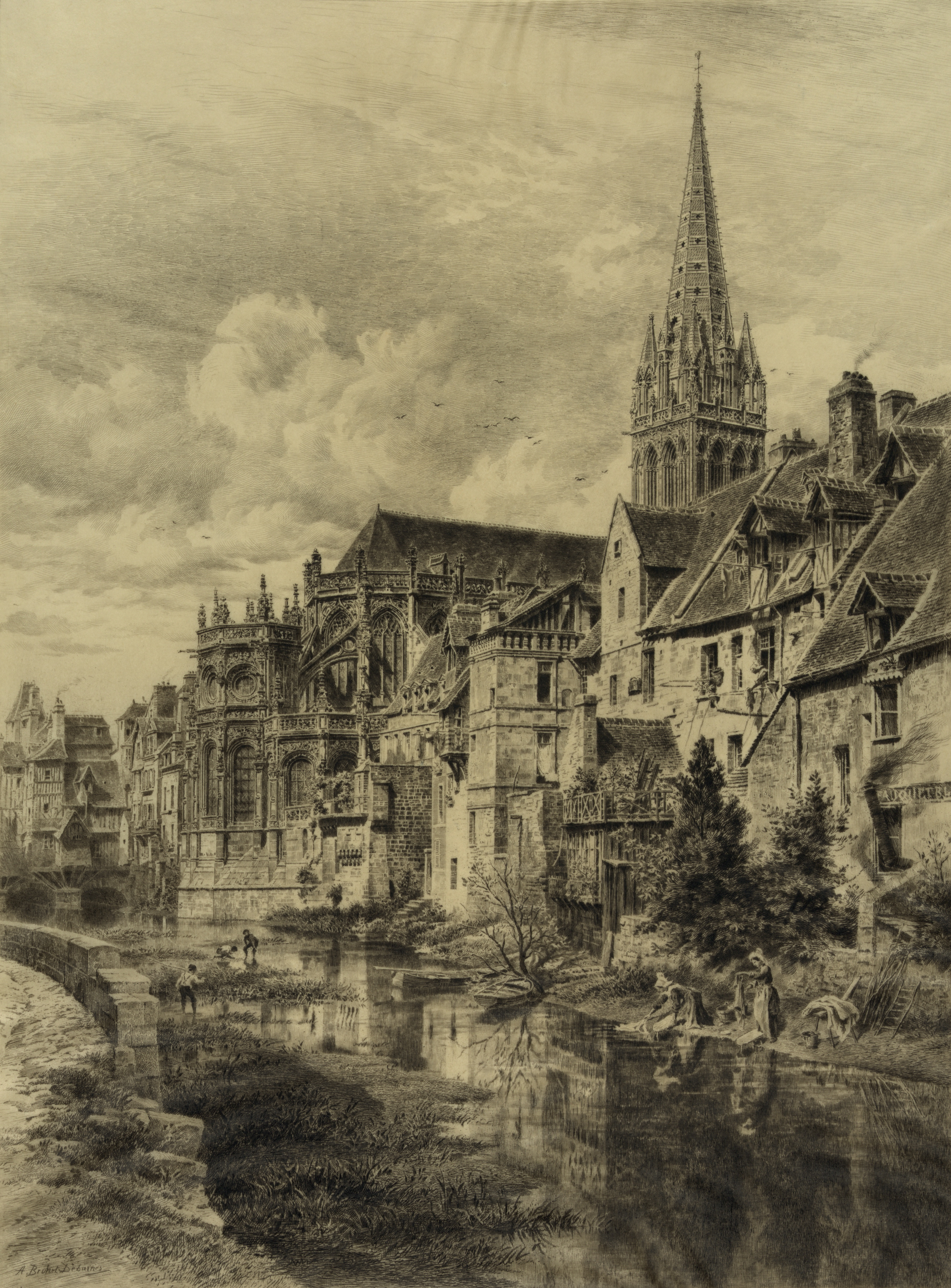
Church of Saint-Pierre, Caen

Alfred Brunet-Debaines (5 November 1845 – 1939) was a French artist and printmaker who depicted street scenes and architecture, and who was the son of the architect Charles-Louis-Fortuné Brunet-Debaines. In 1863, he began his art studies at the École des Beaux-Arts, Paris. During this period he learned etching techniques under masters such as Maxime Lalanne and Jules-Ferdinand Jacquemart (1837–1880). Brunet-Debaines exhibited his first etchings at the Paris Salon in 1866. Around 1870, he was invited to England by writer and critic Philip Gilbert Hamerton who commissioned him to contribute original etchings to his publications, the monthly magazine The Portfolio and Etching and Etchers. Brunet-Debaines thus spent a considerable part of his prolific career in London and Scotland, and regularly exhibited at the Royal Academy between 1872 and 1886. Museums in France and Britain include examples of his etchings in their permanent collections. In 1882, he was elected a member of the Royal Society of Painter-Etchers and Engravers.

Many of his works appeared in The Art Journal, an important Victorian annual dedicated to the visual arts and publishing original etchings by artists such as Axel Haig, James McNeill Whistler, Seymour Haden, Hubert von Herkomer, John MacWhirter, Birket Foster and others.
