= William Biscombe Gardner =

English painter

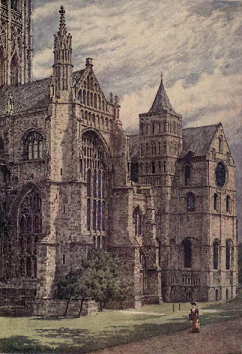
Canterbury Cathedral, south side.

William Biscombe Gardner (1847 – 23 February 1919, Tunbridge Wells) was a British painter and wood-engraver. Working in both watercolour and oils, he exhibited widely in London in the late 19th century at venues such as the Royal Academy and the Grosvenor Gallery. From 1896 he lived at Thirlestane Court.

He illustrated a number of books featuring the British landscape (see below), notably Kent, Canterbury, and The Peak Country. He also drew scenes from the Welsh Elan Valley in the 1890s, before it was flooded to form the Elan Valley Reservoirs, which appeared in two books by Grant Allen (see "illustrated Books" below).

However, it was as a superlative wood-engraver that he was mainly known in his lifetime. He "raised the art of wood-engraving to a very high pitch of excellence" remarked the Kent and Sussex Courier in 1916. His prints (sometimes large) were widely published in many British magazines of the day such as The Pall Mall Gazette, The Illustrated London News, The English Illustrated Magazine and The Magazine of Art. He was a firm advocate of traditional wood-engraving considering it to be the most versatile in comparison to the more conventional methods of engraving and etching, or more recent methods including "process illustration".

== Selected paintings ==
- Apple Blossom.
- Chiddingstone from the corner of the churchyard.
- The Deserted Cottage, Penbury.
- A Game of Ball.
- Packing the Golden Hops.
- The Pantiles, Tunbridge Wells.
- The Question of the Day.
- Their Old Home' Pembury nr Tunbridge Wells.

== Illustrated books ==
- Allen, Grant. Drowning for Liverpool : Lake Vyrnwy and the end of old LLanwyddyn, 1887–89.
- Allen, Grant. A submerged village – Llanwddyn (Mar 1890)
- Gardner, W. Biscombe. Dickens country – watercolours (London: Adam & Charles Black)
- Gardner, W. Biscombe. The garden of England; Kent by brush and Pen (J. Salmon Ltd, 1995).
- Morris, J E. The Peak Country (London: Adam & Charles Black, 1914).
- Shore, W. Teignmouth. Canterbury (Adam & Charles Black, April 1907).
- Shore, W. Teignmouth. Kent (London: Adam & Charles Black, 1907).
- Home, Gordon. Canterbury (A & C Black, 1911)
