= The Portfolio =

British art magazine (1870–1893)

- Categories: Victorian art
- Frequency: Monthly
- Publisher: Seeley & Co; Seeley, Jackson & Halliday
- First issue: 1870
- Final issue: 1893
- Country: United Kingdom
- Based in: London

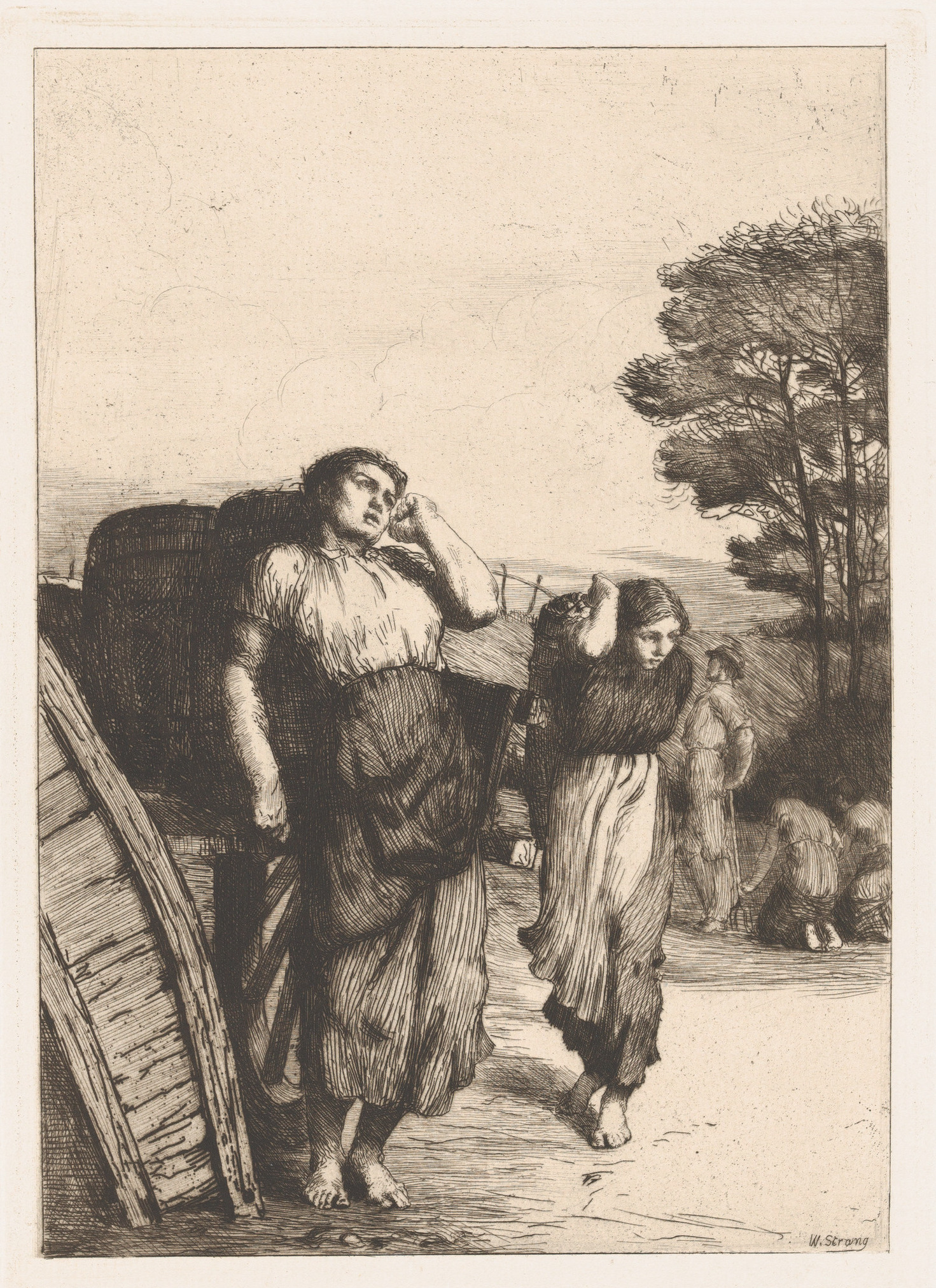
William Strang, Potato Lifting, published in The Portfolio in October 1882.

The Portfolio was a British monthly art magazine published in London from 1870 to 1893. It was founded by Philip Gilbert Hamerton and promoted contemporary printmaking, especially etching, and was important in the British Etching Revival. Early contributors included Francis Turner Palgrave (1824–1897) and Sidney Colvin (1845–1927).

== History ==
The mid-nineteenth century in France and Britain saw a rise in the interest in etching. Hamerton had spent the 1860s in France with his French wife, Eugénie. The impetus for the launch of The Portfolio came in the wake of the foundation in Paris of the Société des aquafortistes in 1862, and to a lesser extent from the longer established Etching Club from 1838. Etchings by many French etchers such as Paul Rajon (1843–1888) and Alfred Brunet-Debaines (1845–1939) were a marked feature of the publication. Indeed, The Standard remarked in 1874 that the publication's "speciality, as probably most people know, is the etchings with which it is adorned." Rajon published twelve etchings in the periodical before his untimely death. The New York Times lavished praise on the publication when, in 1875, it remarked that it could not "eulogize too highly the merits of this periodical in all its departments. It is, without question, the most beautiful in regard to illustration which emanates from the press."

The late nineteenth-century British author George Gissing wrote in his diary for December 1895 (sic.) that he took the magazine for his son, because of its good pictures. In a survey of the etching revival in 1878 the Magazine of Art highlighted the centrality of Hamerton and his monthly magazine which had "so ably and unceasingly pleaded the cause of etching" in Britain.
