= Charles Chapel Judson =

American painter

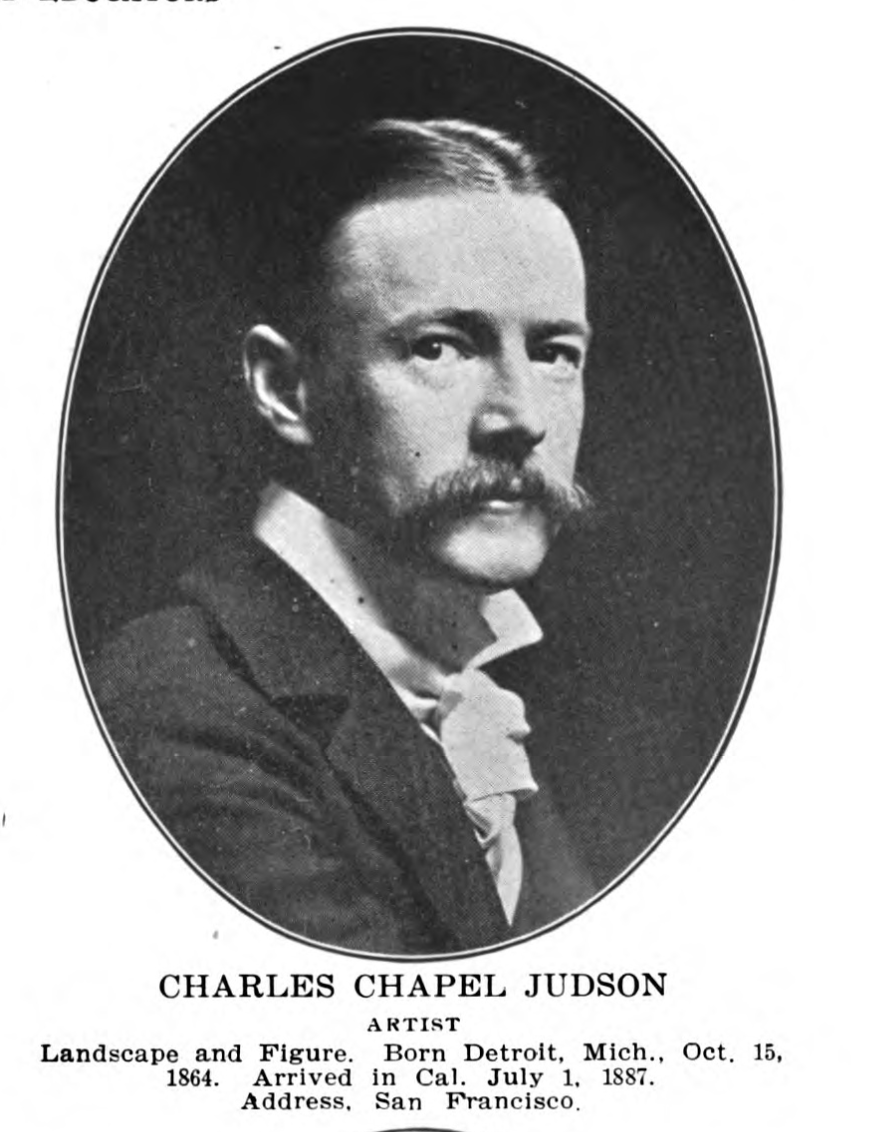
- Born: October 15, 1864; Detroit, Michigan, U.S.
- Died: November 4, 1946 (aged 82); Carmel-by-the-Sea, California, U.S.
- Education: San Francisco Art Institute
- Occupations: Painter, educator
- Spouse: Elizabeth Yard
- Children: 2
- Relatives: Sydney J. Yard (father-in-law)

Charles Chapel Judson (October 15, 1864 – November 4, 1946) was an American painter and educator. He taught in the art department at the University of California, Berkeley for two decades.

== Early life ==
Judson was born on October 15, 1864, in Detroit, Michigan, and he grew up in Kansas City, Missouri. He was trained as a painter at the San Francisco School of Design, as well as in Paris and Munich. In Paris, he studied under Paul-Louis Delance.

== Career ==
Judson was the founder of the art department at the University of California, Berkeley (U.C. Berkeley); where he taught from 1902 to 1923, and he was the department chair from 1921 to 1923.

Since the 1890s Judson made visits to the Monterey Peninsula. He was the president of the Carmel Art Association and the Monterey History and Art Association, and a member of the Bohemian Club.

On April 2, 1904, Judson married the daughter of watercolorist Sydney J. Yard. He painted landscapes of the Carmel coastline, sand dunes, rivers, hills, and trees. He signed his work, "C. Chapel Judson."

== Death ==
Judson died on November 4, 1946, in Carmel-by-the-Sea, at age 82. His work can be seen at the Oakland Museum of California.
