= Laura W. Maxwell =

American painter (1877–1967)

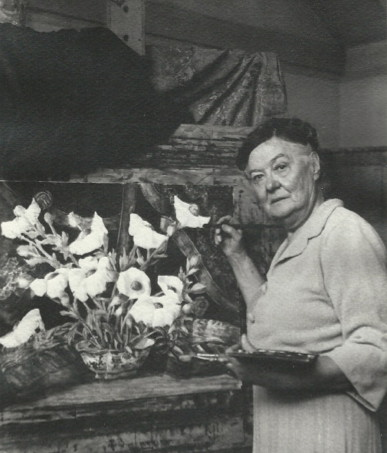
- Maxwell with her painting Lillies
- Born: Laura Amelia Wasson; October 13, 1877; Carson City, Nevada, U.S.
- Died: 7 August 1967 (aged 89); Monterey County, California, U.S.
- Education: Académie Julian
- Occupation: Painter
- Known for: Watercolor painting
- Spouse: William Lindsey Maxwell (m. 1899; died 1928)
- Children: 1

Laura W. Maxwell (October 13, 1877 – August 7, 1967), also known as Laura Maxwell, was an American artist. She painted in oil and watercolor; her subjects included landscape, floral, and marine-themes which were exhibited in various art centers. She helped to establish the Carmel Art Association.

== Early life ==
Maxwell was born on October 13, 1877, in Carson City, Nevada. She was the daughter of Colonel Warren Wasson (1833–1896) and Grace Adelaide Augusta Treadway (1839–1906). Her father was an early pioneer of Nevada. In Italy she studied at the Cainni Studio in Italy, and also with Max Banka.

She traveled throughout her life, to Asia, Italy, France, the Balkans, and to remote areas of Mexico. She met and later married Captain William Lindsey Maxwell (1870–1928) of the United States Navy on August 25, 1988, in San Francisco, California. Her husband served a short term as mayor of Carmel in 1922.

== Career ==
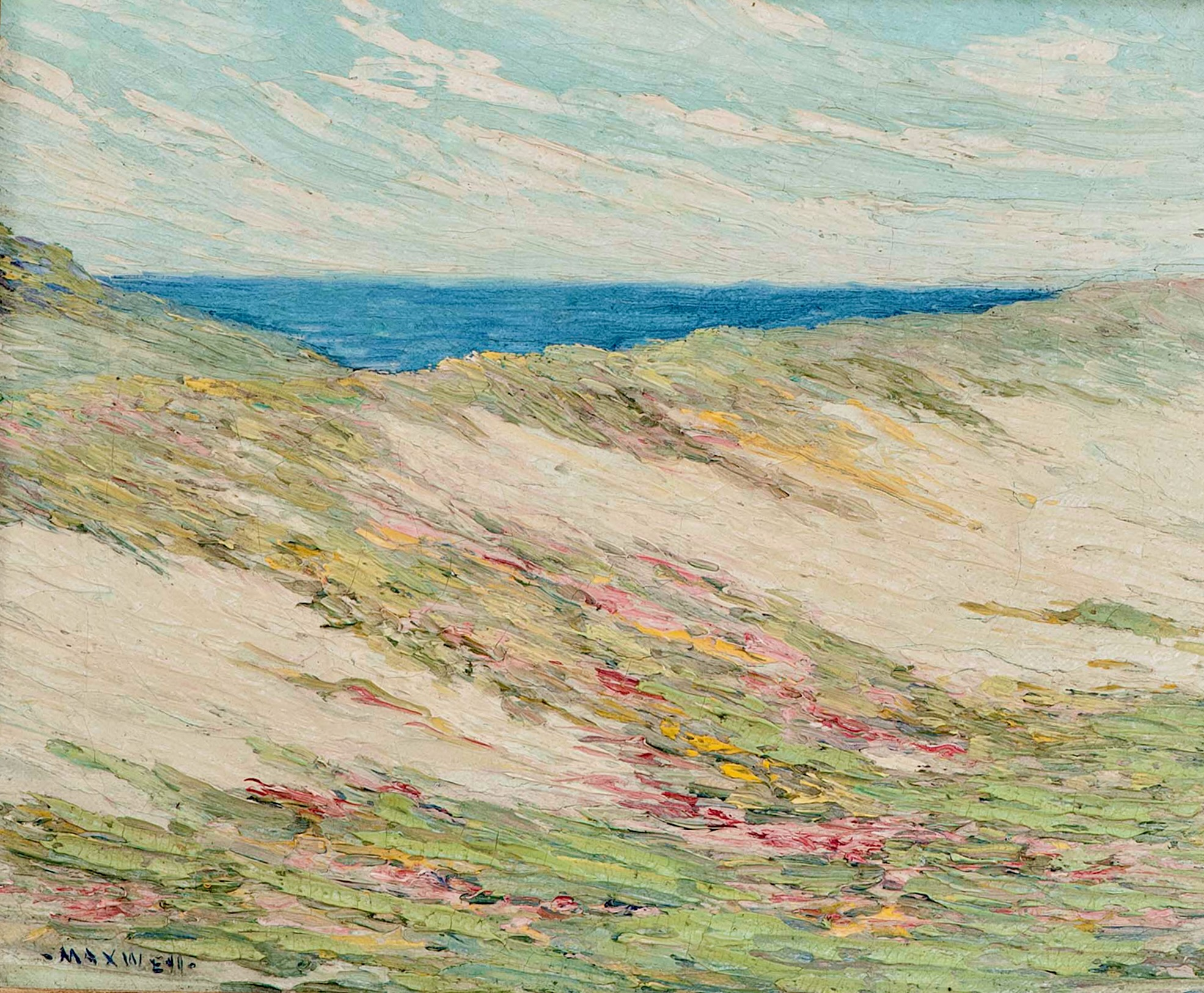
Sand Dune (1916)

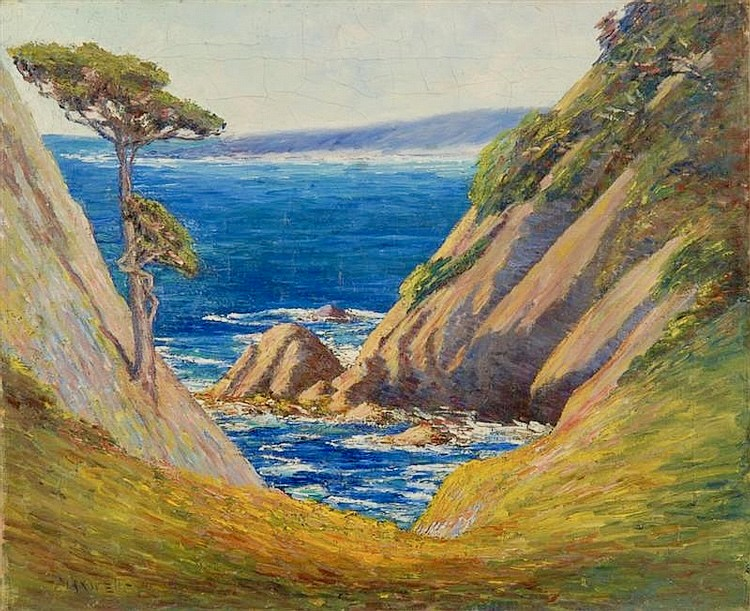
Pt. Lobos (1916)

Maxwell's travels with her husband provided her with subjects to paint. During the summer she would sketch various locations across the United States and Europe. She spent four years studying at the Académie Julian in Paris in 1918 where she met artist students from the Monterey Peninsula, such as Francis McComas and Charles Rollo Peters.

Her artwork was exhibited at the Carmel Arts and Crafts Club, and she painted, along with other local artists, the scenery for the club's production of Josephine Preston Peabody's "The Piper" at the Forest Theater that ran for two days in 1916.

In August 1917, she exhibited Carmel seascapes at the Hotel Clark in Los Angeles, and at the Healy Gallery, St. Louis. In 1918, she had an exhibition of Monterey landscapes at the Rabjohn Galleries in San Francisco. Her subjects included sand dunes, patio gardens, oak trees, and other Monterey and Carmel scenes.

In January 1941, Maxwell gave a demonstration of flower arranging for painting at the Salinas Woman's Club's Garden. In March 1953, she gave a talk at the Santa Cruz Art League, on how to use watercolors alongside examples of her watercolor flower studies.

== Death ==
At the age of 90, Laura Maxwell died on August 7, 1967, at the Ford Ord Hospital in Marina, California.
