= Philip Gilbert Hamerton =

English painter

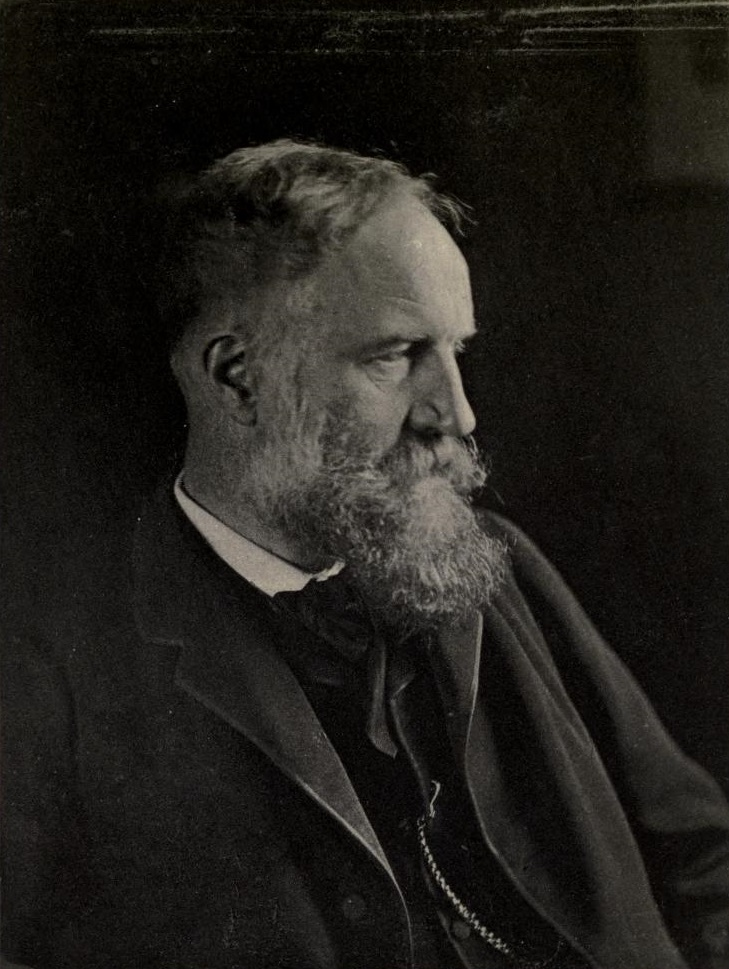
- Philip Gilbert Hamerton by A.H. Palmer
- Born: September 10, 1834; Shaw and Crompton, Lancashire, England
- Died: November 4, 1894 (aged 60); Boulogne-sur-Mer, France
- Occupations: Artist, art critic, author
- Spouse: Eugénie Gindriez (m. 1858)

Philip Gilbert Hamerton (/ˈhæmərtən/; 10 September 1834 – 4 November 1894) was an English artist, art critic and author. He was a keen advocate of contemporary printmaking and most of his writings concern the graphic arts. He was an important theorist of the English Etching Revival.

== Early life ==
Hamerton was born at Laneside, a hamlet near Shaw and Crompton, Lancashire, England. His mother died giving birth to him, and his father died ten years later. When he was about five, he was sent to live with his two aunts at an estate called the Hollins on the edge of Burnley, where he attended Burnley Grammar School.

== Career ==
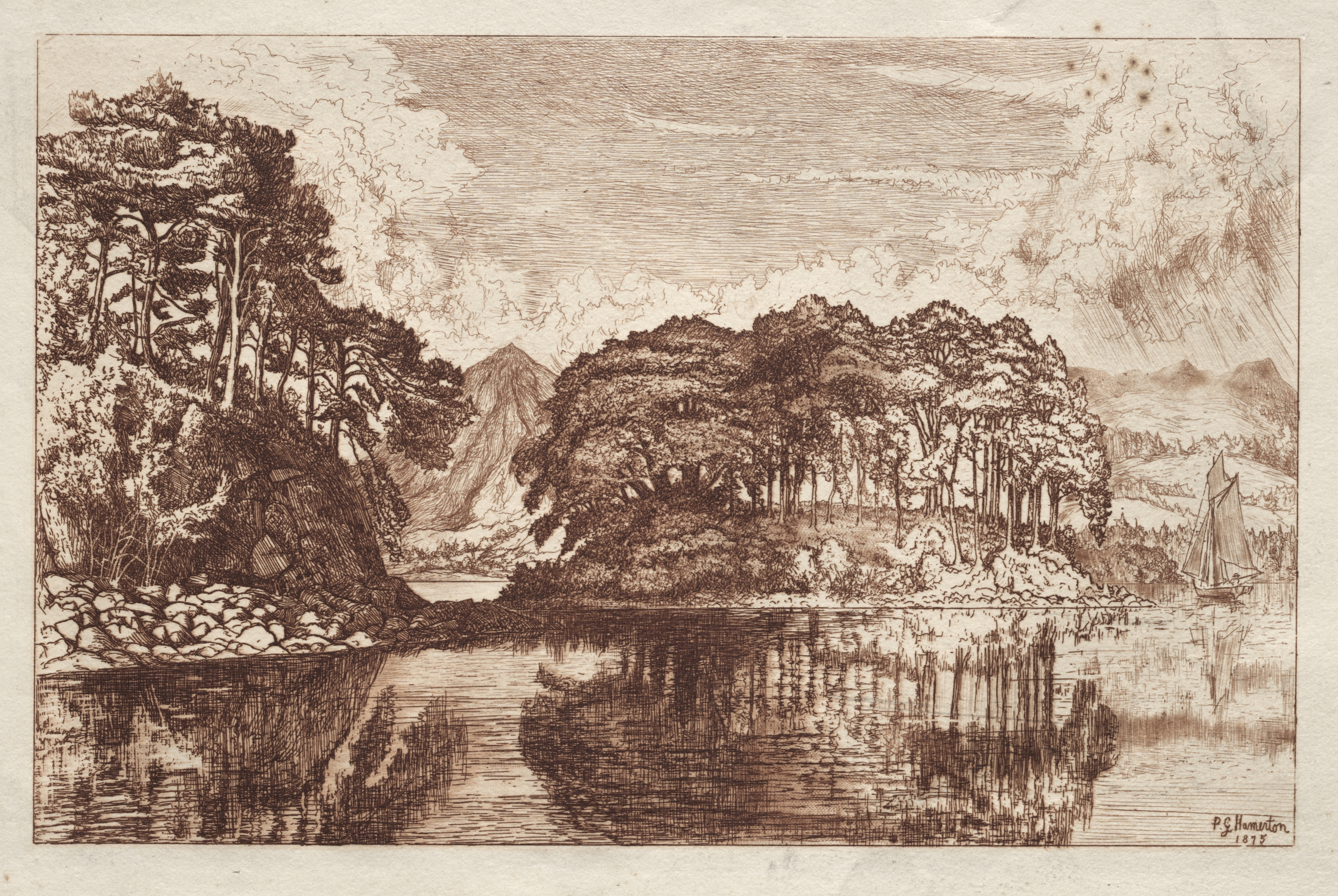
The Lake, etching, 1875

Hamerton's first literary attempt, a volume of poems, was unsuccessful, leading him to devote himself for a time entirely to landscape painting; he camped out in the Scottish Highlands, where he eventually rented the former island of Inistrynich in Loch Awe. In 1858, Hamerton married Eugénie Gindriez, the daughter of a French republican magistrate, and they remained married until his death in 1894.

Discovering after a time that he was more suited to art criticism than painting, he moved to Sens and later to Autun, where he produced his Painter's Camp in the Highlands (1863), which was very successful and prepared the way for his standard work on Etching and Etchers (1866). In the following year he published Contemporary French Painters, and in 1868 a continuation, Painting in France after the Decline of Classicism.

He had by now become art critic to the Saturday Review, which necessitated frequent visits to England, forcing him to give it up. He proceeded in 1870 to establish and edit an art journal of his own, The Portfolio, a monthly periodical, each number of which included of a monograph upon some artist or group of artists, often written by him. The journal championed printmaking, especially etching. He selected and wrote the accompanying text for Etchings by French and English Artists (London: Seeley, 1874) which included work by Alphonse Legros and Léon Gaucherel. The discontinuation of his painting gave him time for writing, and he successively produced The Intellectual Life (1873), perhaps the best known and most valuable of his writings; Round my House (1876), notes on French society by a resident; and Modern Frenchmen (1879), admirable short biographies. He also wrote two novels, Wenderholme (1870) and Marmorne (1878).

In 1884 Human Intercourse, another volume of essays, was published, and shortly afterwards Hamerton began his autobiography, which he brought down to 1858. In 1882 he issued a finely illustrated work on the technique of the great masters of various arts, under the title of The Graphic Arts, and three years later another illustrated volume, Landscape, which traces the influence of landscape upon the mind of man. His last books were: Portfolio Papers (1889) and French and English (1889).

In 1891 he removed to Villa Clématis in the Parc des Princes district of Boulogne-Billancourt in the southwest suburbs of Paris. He died there on 4 November 1894, aged sixty. His wife later wrote that that an attack of influenza followed by a fatal pulmonary illness was likely the main cause of his death, and that he had continued working on The Portfolio and other art writings until shortly before his death, which may have contributed to his poor health even more due to stress. In 1897, Philip Gilbert Hamerton: an Autobiography, 1834–1858; and a Memoir by his Wife, 1858–1894 was published.
