= The Magazine of Art =

Defunct monthly British journal

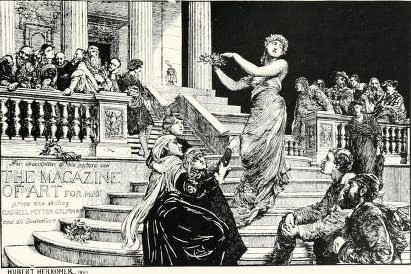
Poster for The Magazine of Art (wood-engraving after Hubert von Herkomer, 1881)

The Magazine of Art was an illustrated monthly British journal devoted to the visual arts, published from May 1878 to July 1904 in London and New York City by Cassell, Petter, Galpin & Co. It included reviews of exhibitions, articles about artists and all branches of the visual arts, as well as some poetry, and was lavishly illustrated by leading wood-engravers of the period such as William Biscombe Gardner.

== History ==
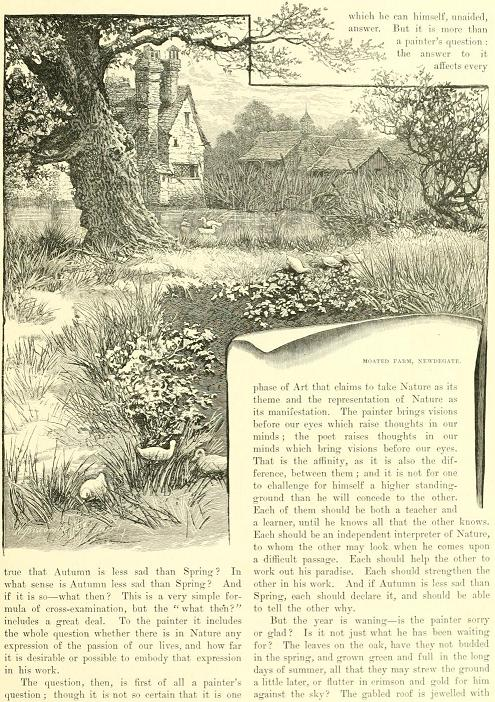
A page from the magazine with wood-engraving by William Biscombe Gardner

Its origins can be traced back to May 1851, when the House of Cassell started publication of a journal devoted to The Great Exhibition of that year. It evolved, in 1852, into The Illustrated Exhibitor and Magazine of Art, a weekly devoted to the arts, educational in purpose and offering "culture for the little cultured". It changed name in February 1853 to The Illustrated Magazine of Art but never achieved great popularity and ceased publication in 1854. The magazine was revived for a while during the 1862 International Exhibition but then lay dormant until 1878.

The Magazine of Art itself started publication on 25 April 1878, the same year as the Exposition Universelle in Paris, and was edited initially by Arthur J. R. Trendell until 1880. Editorship then passed in turn to Eric Robertson (1880–81), William Ernest Henley (1881–86), Sidney Galpin (1886) and Marion Harry Spielmann (1886–1904), who also edited The Pall Mall Gazette. Within three years of starting publication, the magazine had become firmly established and now included art reviews. Artist Hubert Herkomer was persuaded to design a poster for the magazine which depicted the goddess of art on the steps of a temple with the great masters of art looking on in approval (see image above).

No expense was spared in producing the journal which was regarded as the "flag of the house". It sought to engage the interest of the art lover and art collector while retaining an independent critical voice. One of its most popular contributors was artist William W. Fenn who by then had lost his sight. Despite his blindness, he was able to contribute reviews with the help of his wife who took him around the galleries and gave him verbal information about the exhibits.

W. E. Henley (1881–86) was responsible for revitalising the magazine and transforming it into a "lively cosmopolitan review of the arts" that was influential in shaping the public's perception of and taste in art. He engaged eminent artists and literary figures to write for the journal including R. L. Stevenson, Richard Jefferies, J. Comyns Carr and others, and the quality of the wood engravings was further improved. He also introduced poetry to its pages.

M. H. Spielmann was editor for 17 years from 1886 to 1904 and encouraged many well known artists, as well as leading art critic John Ruskin, to contribute articles. In 1888, a supplement was introduced called Royal Academy Pictures, which, as its name suggests, contained reproductions of the chief works from the annual Royal Academy exhibitions in London. However, The Magazine of Art failed to make sufficient returns to justify its continued existence and publication ceased in 1904, though Royal Academy Pictures continued until 1916.
