= Harold Sutton Palmer =

English painter (1854–1933)

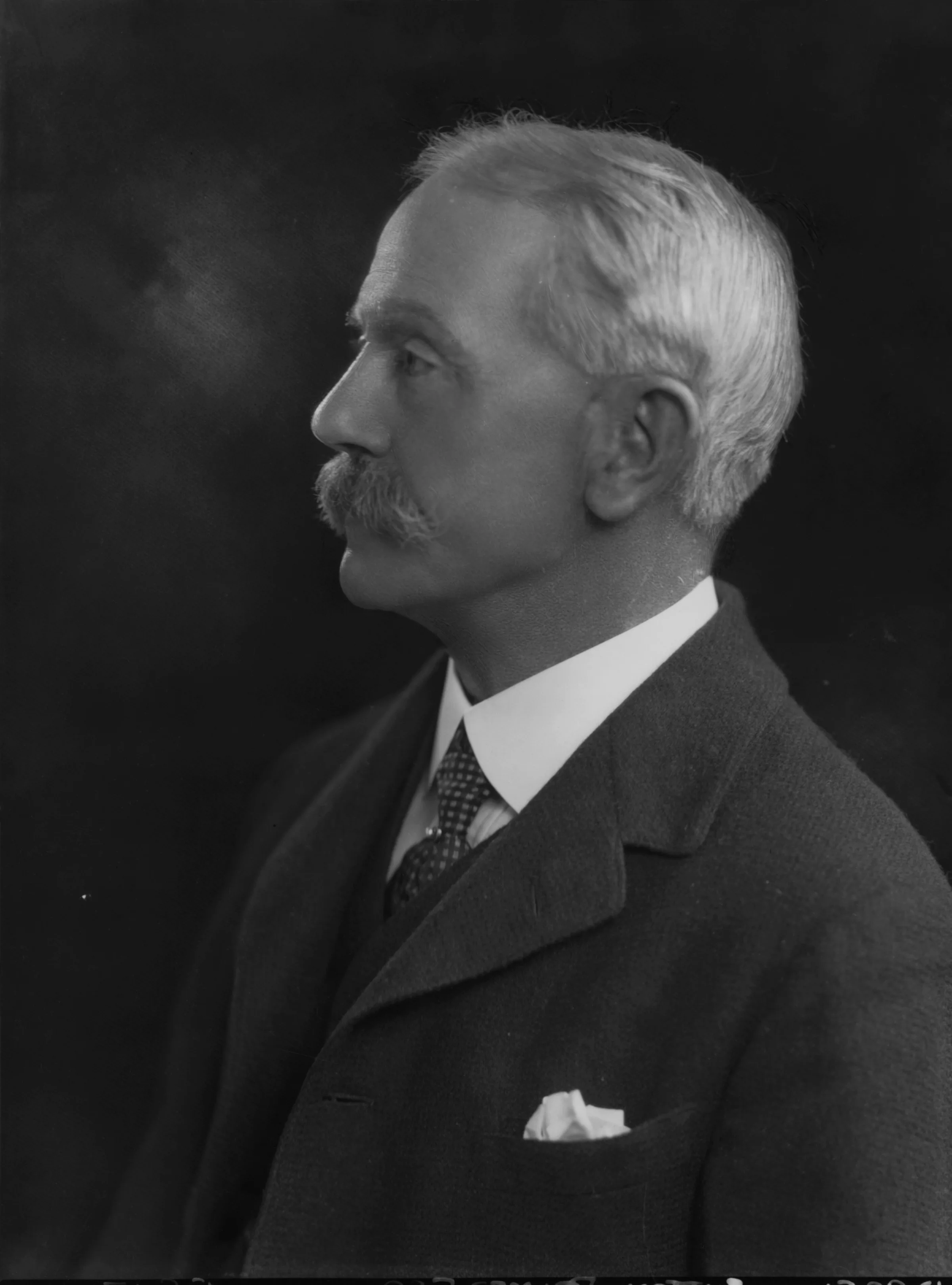
Palmer in 1927

Harold "Harry" Sutton Palmer (28 December 1854 – 8 May 1933) was an English watercolour landscape painter and illustrator.

== Life and work ==
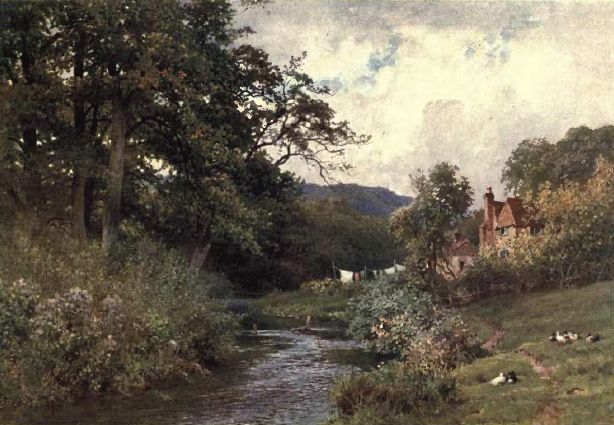
A stream near Shalford (watercolor, 1906)

Sutton Palmer was born in Plymouth in Devon, England, and studied at the Royal College of Art for two years, winning a gold medal for his work. He exhibited in London - at the Royal Academy (RA) from 1870, Fine Art Society, Leicester Galleries and Dowdeswell galleries - and in New York City. He was a member of the Royal Society of British Artists (RBA) from 1892 and Royal Institute of Painters in Water Colours (RI) from 1920.

He illustrated several travel books for the publisher A & C Black (see below), as well as postcards for A & C Black and Salmon.

Sutton Palmer specialised in idyllic rustic landscapes painted in watercolours. He lived in London but painted widely in England (e.g. Surrey, Berkshire, Devon, The Lake District, Yorkshire) and Scotland. His works can now be found in art galleries such as the Victoria and Albert Museum, Leek Art Gallery and Wardown Park Museum, Luton, and also in private collections.

Sutton Palmer married Maud Moore in 1889 at San Jose, California. He resided in California for short periods, and painted a series of California scenes.

== Illustrated books ==
- Bradley, A. G. The rivers & streams of England (London, A. and C. Black, 1909)
- Moncrieff, A. R. H. Bonnie Scotland (London A. & C. Black, 1912). 1st edition, 1904.
- Austin, Mary Hunter. California : the land of the sun (London : A. and C. Black, 1914).
- Mitton, G. E. Buckinghamshire and Berkshire (A & C Black, 1920)
- Moncrieff, A. R. H. Surrey (London A. & C. Black, 1922).
- Sutton Palmer, H. Devon: Water colours (A & C Black, 1951).
- Sutton Palmer "Surrey Water-Colours" (A & C Black, 1915) Black's Water-Colour Series.
