= Theodore Criley =

American painter

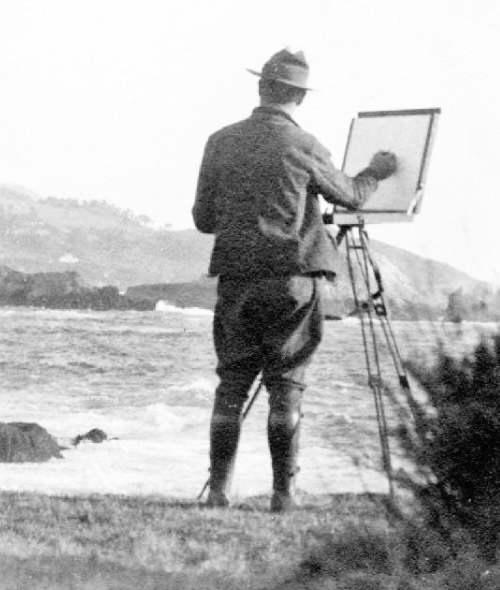
- Criley at his easel
- Born: Theodore Morrow Criley; March 26, 1880; Lawrence, Kansas, US
- Died: October 5, 1930; Palo Alto, California, U.S.
- Education: Chicago Fine Arts Institute
- Occupation: Painter
- Spouse: Myrtle Brotherton
- Children: 2 sons, 1 daughter

Theodore Criley (March 26, 1880 - October 5, 1930) was an American hotel manager and landscape artist. He joined the art colony in Carmel-by-the-Sea, where he was a watercolorist, portrait painter, and wood engraver. His artwork was well received by fellow artists Jennie V. Cannon and Percy Gray, as well as art critics for the San Francisco Chronicle and the Oakland Tribune. His work can be seen at the Mills College Art Museum in Oakland, California.

== Early life ==
Criley grew up in Kansas City, Missouri, and he attended the Chicago Fine Arts Institute. He studied at a University in Berlin, where he met Mary Myrtle Brotherton. In 1904, Criley married Brotherton in Los Angeles. They had two sons, including architect Theodore Criley Jr., and a daughter. In 1911, he went to Paris at the Académie de la Grande Chaumière under Lucien Simon and Émile Bénard.

== Career ==
Criley began his career as the manager of the Coates House Hotel in Kansas City, Missouri and the Lexington Hotel in Chicago.

At the start of World War I, Criley and his family moved to Monterey, California in 1916, and visited the art colony in Carmel-by-the-Sea. He bought a 9 acres (3.6 ha) lot in Carmel Highlands, California near Point Lobos. He built a home that was called "The Three Corners." Fellow artists, John O'Shea and William Frederic Ritschel were his neighbors.

Criley became a watercolorist, portrait painter, and wood engraver. He acted in Forest Theater productions, including Robin Hood in 1919, Yellow Jacket in 1920, and Pomander Walk and Twelve Pound Look in 1921.

In 1916, he exhibited with the San Francisco Art Association. He continued to exhibit at SFAA into the late 1920s. In 1925, he exhibited two watercolors, Jaira and Ghost Cypress. His 1920 landscape entitled That Way Danger Lies was exhibited at the Cannel & Ghaffin Galleries in Los Angeles. In 1921, he held a solo exhibition at the Helgesen Gallery in San Francisco with 17 paintings of seascapes and landscapes of Carmel and Point Lobos. In August 1926 he held a one-week solo show at the Carmel Arts and Crafts Club. In 1925, Criley exhibited at the Inaugural Exhibition at Oakland's Mills College Art Gallery where he served on the advisory art committee. In 1927, Criley exhibited at the inaugural exhibition of the Carmel Art Association. The Argus in San Francisco described his entry into this exhibition as an “academic portrait of Dr. McDougall of the Carnegie Laboratory... a solid painting and a creditable contribution to the group.” His artwork was well received by fellow artists Jennie V. Cannon and Percy Gray, as well as art critics for the San Francisco Chronicle and the Oakland Tribune.

In March 1922, Criley fought and won a highly publicized "duel of fists" with playwright Harry Leon Wilson. Details of their long-standing feud made banner headlines in the San Francisco press and were given prominent coverage across the country on the International News Wire, including stories in the Los Angeles Times and New York Times. It was revealed that their argument originated with "a light romantic" love scene between Criley and Wilson's wife, Helen Cooke Wilson, in the 1921 production of Pomander Walk at Carmel's Forest Theatre. Wilson sent Criley a series of accusatory letters, including a 24-page invective, and demanded satisfaction in this "affair of honor". He spent three months in Honolulu undergoing physical training and instruction in boxing, then he returned and the two men met on "a high cliff overlooking the sea". Criley thrashed Wilson in ten minutes.

In the 1926 and 1927, Criley made trips to Arizona with a close friend and artist John O'Shea. Paintings from these excursions resulted in art showings.

From 1929 to 1930 Criley traveled with his family to Europe and Africa where he did sculpting and sketching.

== Death and legacy ==
Criley died of a heart attack on October 5, 1930, in Palo Alto, California.

Playwright Martin Flavin and writer James Hopper wrote Criley’s obituaries. Hopper spoke about Criley's familiar habits and added that “He never painted a tenth as much as he wanted to paint."

In November 1932, a memorial exhibition of 35 of his watercolors was held at the Stanford University Art Gallery and included paintings from Morocco, France and Carmel. His work can be seen at the Mills College Art Museum in Oakland, California.

=== List of exhibitions ===
- Paris Salon (1913)
- San Francisco Art Association (1916-28)
- Auction Comique in Oakland (1917)
- Cannel & Ghaffin Galleries (1920)
- Helgesen Gallery (1921)
- Architecture Hall (U.C. Berkeley) (1921)
- Mills College Art Museum (1925)
- Carmel Arts and Crafts Club (1926)
- Mission Art and Curio Store (1926)
- Hotel San Carlos Art Gallery (1926)
- East-West Gallery in San Francisco (1927)
- Carmel Art Association (1927)
- International Water Color Exhibition (1928)
- Pennsylvania Academy of the Fine Arts
- Chaffey College (1945)
