= Criley =

Criley is a surname. Notable people with the surname include:

- J. Michael Criley (born 1931), American medical professor
- Theodore Criley (1880–1930), American hotel manager and painter
