= Jennie V. Cannon =

American painter (1869–1952)

Jennie Vennerström Cannon
- Cannon in the mid-1920s
- Born: Jennie Amelia Vennerström; August 31, 1869; Albert Lea, Minnesota, U.S.
- Died: December 12, 1952 (aged 83); Tucson, Arizona, U.S.
- Education: Hamline University, Stanford University, National Academy of Design, New York School of Art, London School of Art
- Occupations: painter, etcher, writer, teacher
- Spouse: William Austin Cannon (1898–1917; divorced)

Jennie Amelia Vennerström Cannon, also known as Jennie Vennerstrom Cannon (1869–1952), was an American artist who spent most of her career in California but gained national recognition. She received the first master's degree from the Art Department at Stanford University, studied in New York with William Merritt Chase, whom she befriended and later persuaded to teach at Carmel-by-the-Sea, California, and received both the Elliott Bronze Medal and the Langdon Prize at the National Academy of Design. From her studio-homes in Berkeley and Carmel, California, her art was sent on traveling exhibitions across the United States. She was instrumental in founding the Carmel Art Association and the California League of Fine Arts in Berkeley. She championed women's equality in art communities across northern California. Her published art reviews appeared for decades in regional newspapers.

== Early life ==
Jennie Amelia Vennerström was born to impoverished immigrants from Sweden on August 31, 1869 outside of Albert Lea, Minnesota. Within a few years her mother had died and her father had abandoned the family. She and her sister were passed among relatives and received little formal education.

Jennie became a voracious reader and with a series of part-time jobs and special tutoring she earned a bachelor's degree from Hamline University in 1895. Her career in art quickly accelerated with her studies under Arthur Bridgman Clark and Bolton Brown at Stanford University, where she earned the first Master's degree in art.

== Career ==
On January 9, 1898 she married the botanist William Austin Cannon in Pacific Grove, California. When the couple moved to New York City in 1901, Jennie studied with the genre painter Edgar Melville Ward at the National Academy of Design, where she was awarded the prestigious Elliott Bronze Medal in Sculpture and the Langdon Prize for Graphic Design. The following year she studied with William Merritt Chase at the New York School of Art, but was compelled to move in September 1903 to Tucson, Arizona to accommodate her husband's employment. Every summer she travelled to the Monterey Peninsula on the Pacific Coast and in 1907 purchased real estate in Carmel, where she joined the local art colony and habitually exhibited at the Carmel Arts and Crafts Club.

In January 1910, she began advanced studies with Frank Brangwyn at the London School of Art and concluded with a grand tour of Europe and North Africa. During her time in Bruges she rented the vacant studio of Francis Petrus Paulus.

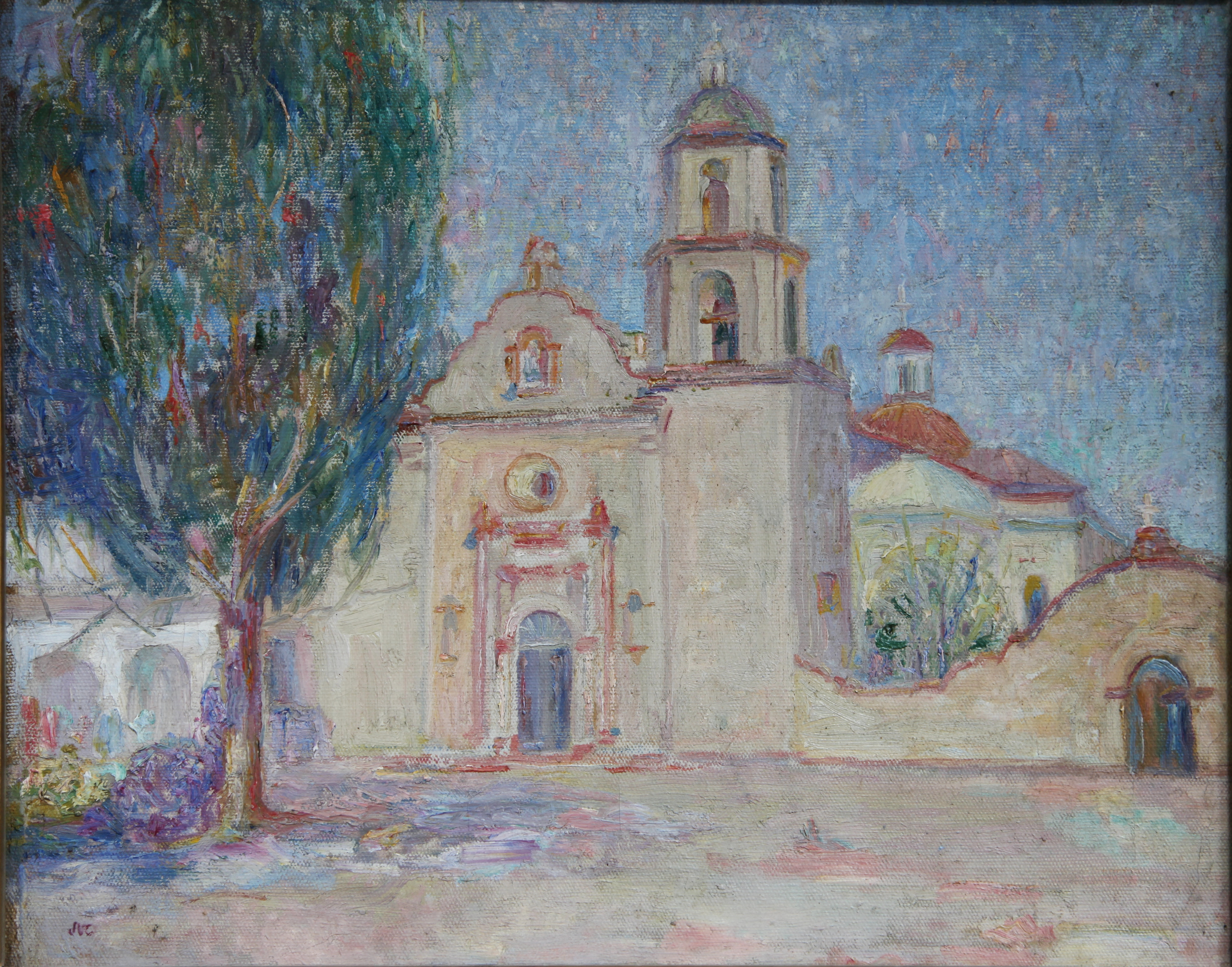
San Luis Rey, 1905

On her return to the United States she became a prolific exhibitor. Between October 1911 and October 1912 at juried exhibitions in the state and county fairs of Arizona she was awarded a total of 13 first prizes and 3 second prizes. In 1914 Jennie persuaded William Merritt Chase to teach his last summer class in Carmel and was elected to the Society of Monterey Artists.

After a traumatic divorce from her husband in 1917 she traveled to New York City and joined the radical People's Art Guild. On her return to California a year later she became a founding member of the Laguna Beach Art Association and purchased a home in Berkeley, California. Relying solely on the sales of her art and the earnings from her students and weekly art reviews in the Berkeley Daily Gazette, she supported both of her sons through college. In 1923 she was the co-founder of the California League of Fine Arts in Berkeley, where she insisted that women artists be given equal representation on juries; she was honored with the first one-person show in the League Galleries. In 1926 she was the only woman artist with a biography in the official five-volume history of the State of California. A year later she conceived of and helped organize the Carmel Art Association. In the 1930s she deemphasized oil painting in favor of graphic arts and watercolors. Her art traveled across the United States on “circuit exhibitions” sponsored by the American Federation of Arts and the National League of American Pen Women.

She died in Tucson, Arizona, on December 12, 1952.

== Published works ==
Watershed Drama: Battle Lake, Minnesota. Berkeley, Calif.: J. J. Gillick & Co., 1943.
