= Ida A. Johnson =

Carmel-by-the-Sea artist (1850-1931)

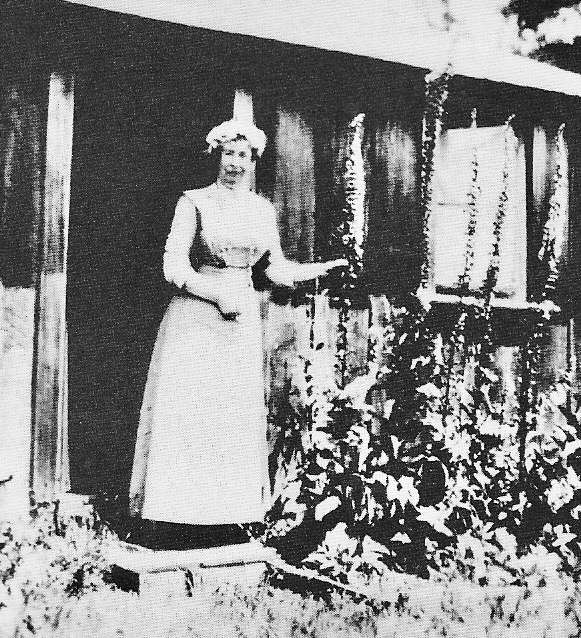
- Ida Johnson (1850–1931)
- Born: Ida Anna Johnson; January 13, 1850; Nyack, New York, US
- Died: March 7, 1931 (aged 81); Carmel-by-the-Sea, California, US
- Occupation: Watercolorist
- Partner: Josephine M. Culbertson

Ida A. Johnson (January 13, 1850 – March 8, 1931) was an American painter known for her botanical still lifes and china painting.

== Early life and education ==
Johnson was born on January 13, 1850, in Nyack, New York, to a Quaker pastor. She began her art education at the Parker School in Brooklyn, where she met her long-term partner, Culbertson. She later studied at Arthur Wesley Dow’s Summer School of Art in Ipswich, Massachusetts.

== Career ==
=== New York ===
While in New York, Johnson lectured on ceramics at Adelphi College in Garden City for nearly a decade and served as president of the National Ceramic Society for four years.

She and Culbertson founded a studio and salon at 193 St. James Place in Brooklyn. On April 2, 1898, Johnson exhibited the watercolor Songbirds of Our Land while Culbertson presented Twilight Park.

=== Carmel-by-the-Sea and Gray Gables ===
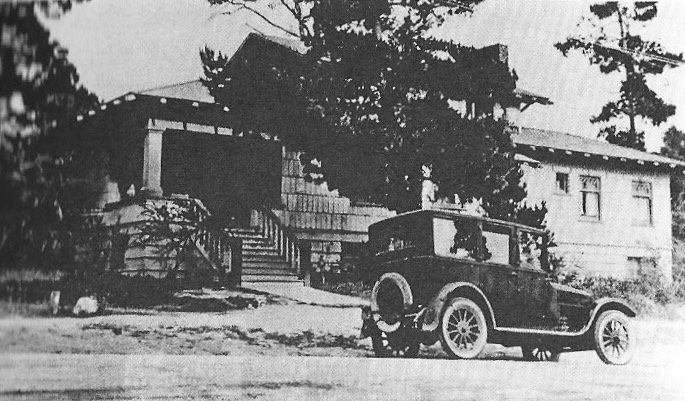
Gray Gables on Lincoln Street and 7th Avenue, Carmel-by-the-Sea.

In 1906, Johnson and Culbertson relocated to Carmel-by-the-Sea, California, where they established their home and studio, Gray Gables. The space became a gathering place for artists and hosted art shows and meetings of the Carmel Art Association. The Carmel Art Association, founded in 1914, is the second-oldest continuously operating artist cooperative in the nation and the oldest west of the Mississippi."95 Years of Art: Celebrating an Association that Shaped Carmel"

Johnson was involved in local organizations, including the Dickens Club and the Carmel Boys' Club, where she taught classes. She also served as Chairwoman and Curator of the Museum of Yesteryear.

Both Johnson and Culbertson were active members of the Carmel Library Association, which commenced operations on October 5, 1905. Johnson served as the library board president and as a librarian.

Keramic Studio magazine published several of Johnson's artworks, including California Wild Flowers, Matilija Poppy, and California Poppy,, in their 1912 edition.

== Death ==
On March 8, 1931, Johnson died in an automotive accident.

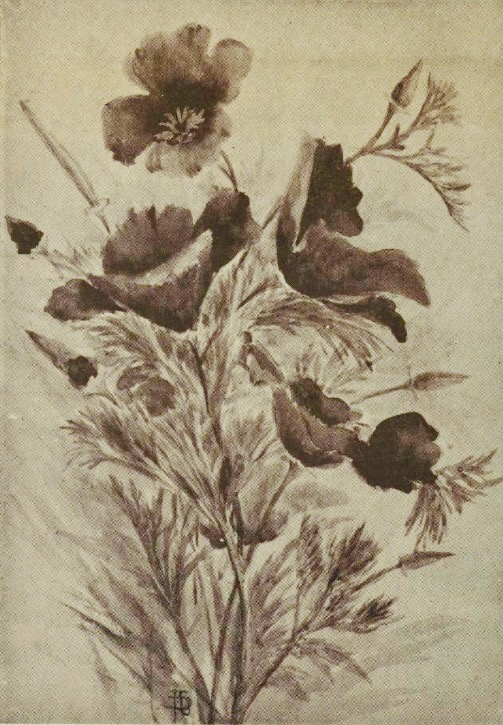
California Poppies (Eschscholzia), part of a restoration of a set of 78 original wildflower paintings crafted by Johnson.
