= Francis Petrus Paulus =

American artist

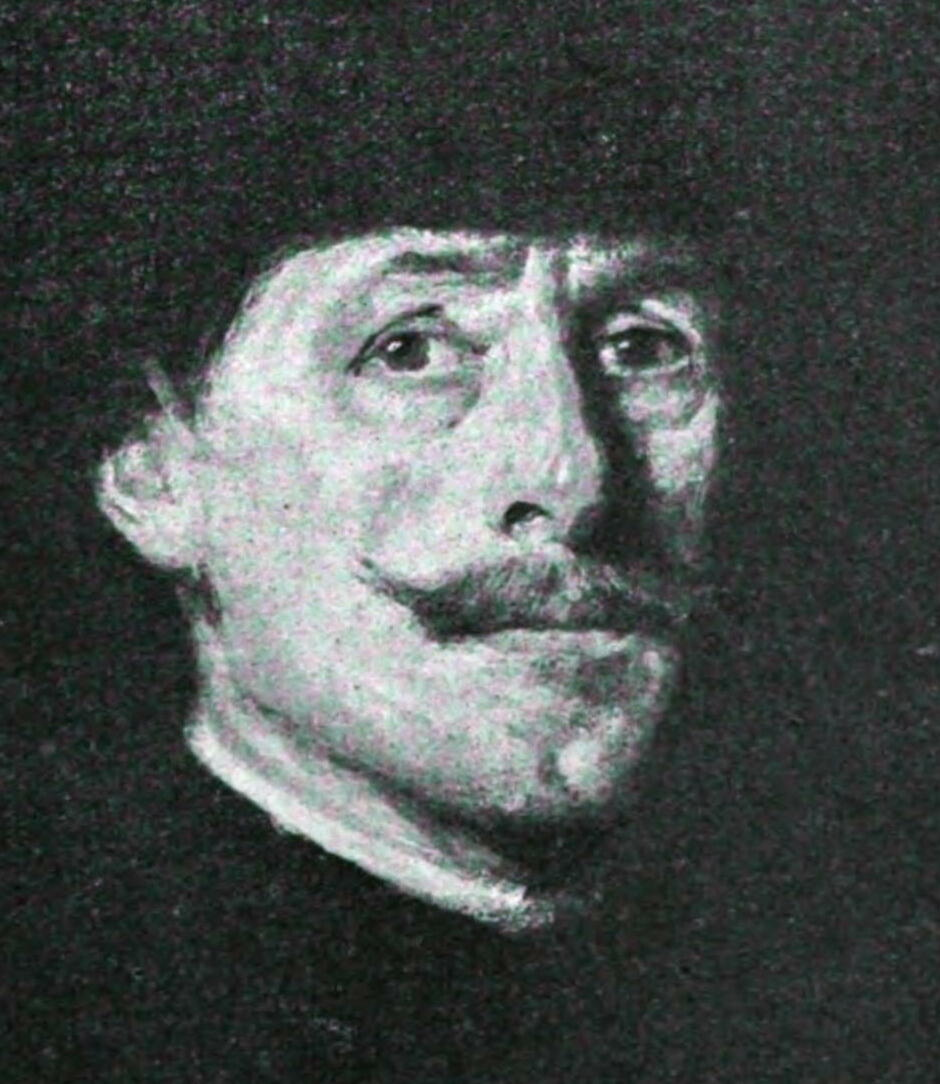
- Self-portrait, by 1912
- Born: March 11, 1862; Detroit, Michigan, United States
- Died: February 2, 1933 (aged 70); Detroit, Michigan, United States
- Education: Pennsylvania Academy of Fine Arts; Academy of Fine Arts, Munich; École des Beaux-Arts, Paris
- Known for: Painting, etching, teaching
- Awards: Detroit Museum of Art Founders Society Prize, 1926

Signature
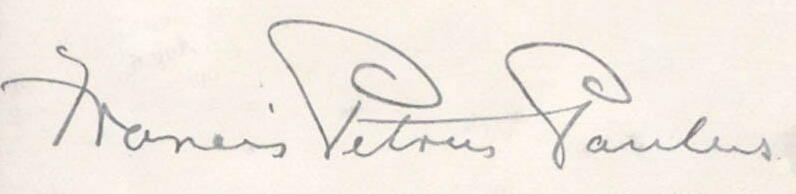

Francis Petrus Paulus (March 13, 1862 – February 2, 1933) was an American visual artist and teacher, known for paintings and etchings. He often depicted scenes of Bruges, Belgium, where from 1898 he kept a studio and lived for part of each year; from 1905 he directed an art school in Bruges. His other home was his native Detroit, where he taught painting and drawing at the Detroit Art Museum (now Detroit Institute of Arts), of which he became a trustee, and where he cofounded the Detroit Art Academy.

== Education ==
He was born in Detroit in 1862, the son of Charles and Catherine Paulus. He attended the Pennsylvania Academy of the Fine Arts, where his instructors included Thomas Eakins, whom Paulus later remembered as "very kindly and humorous."

In Europe, Paulus became a pupil of Ludwig von Löfftz at the Academy of Fine Arts, Munich, and of Léon Bonnat at the École des Beaux-Arts in Paris.

== Career to World War I ==
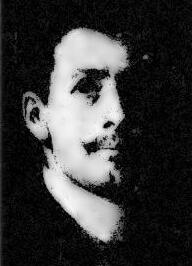
Paulus, photograph published in 1909

Paulus was active as a painter, etcher, and educator.

He taught painting and drawing at the Detroit Art Museum from 1880 to 1890. From 1896 to 1898 he was director of the Ann Arbor Art School. From 1895 to 1903 he was a director of the Detroit Art Academy (later the Wicker School of Fine Arts), which he co-founded with Joseph W. Gies. From 1905 he directed an art school in Bruges.

From 1898 he split his time between Detroit and Bruges, Belgium, where kept a studio and lived for part of each year, taking inspiration for his etchings from the markets, canals, and buildings of the city. He also spent time in Portugal, Spain, Italy, and Holland, and in Paris, where from 1904 to 1909 he exhibited paintings at the annual Paris Salon.

In 1907 he exhibited paintings and etchings at the Exposition Générale des Beaux-Arts in Brussels, and in 1908 his work appeared in the exhibit Bruges, ses Peintres: Exposition Internationale de Beaux-Arts.

In 1908 and 1909, he exhibited at the London Salon of the Allied Artists' Association, held at the Royal Albert Hall. In 1912, he exhibited jointly with his friend the British sculptor Alfred Gilbert at the gallery Le Salon in London.

In 1914, as World War I loomed, Paulus had two etchings accepted for the Exposition Générale des Beaux-Arts in Brussels, scheduled to open May 9 and to close November 2. The German invasion began on August 4, and on August 17 the government, which organized the exposition, abandoned Brussels. The date of his departure is unknown, but by February 1915 Paulus was back in Detroit. He was not to return to Belgium until the war was over.

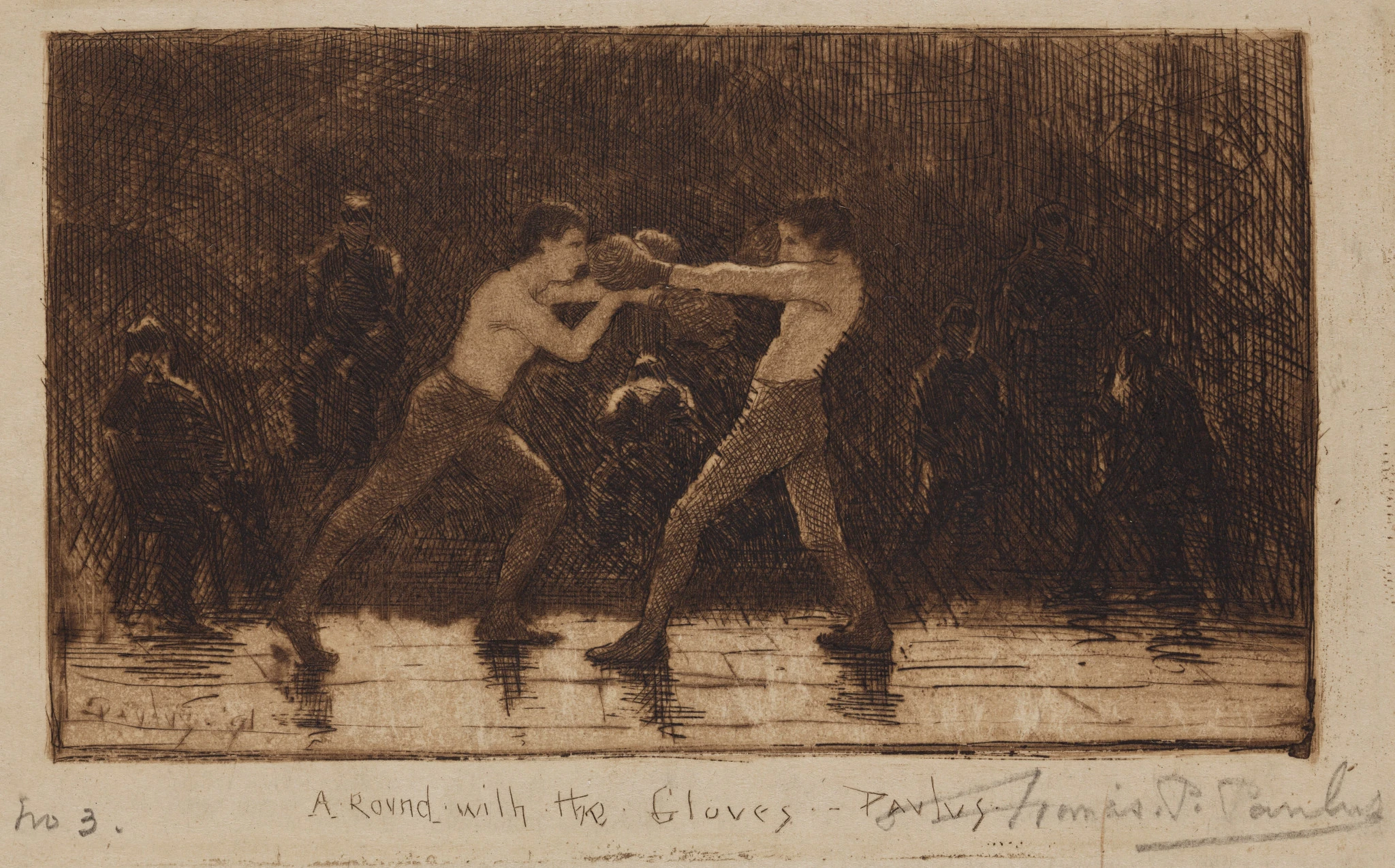
The artist's earliest known etching, A Round with the Gloves, 1891.

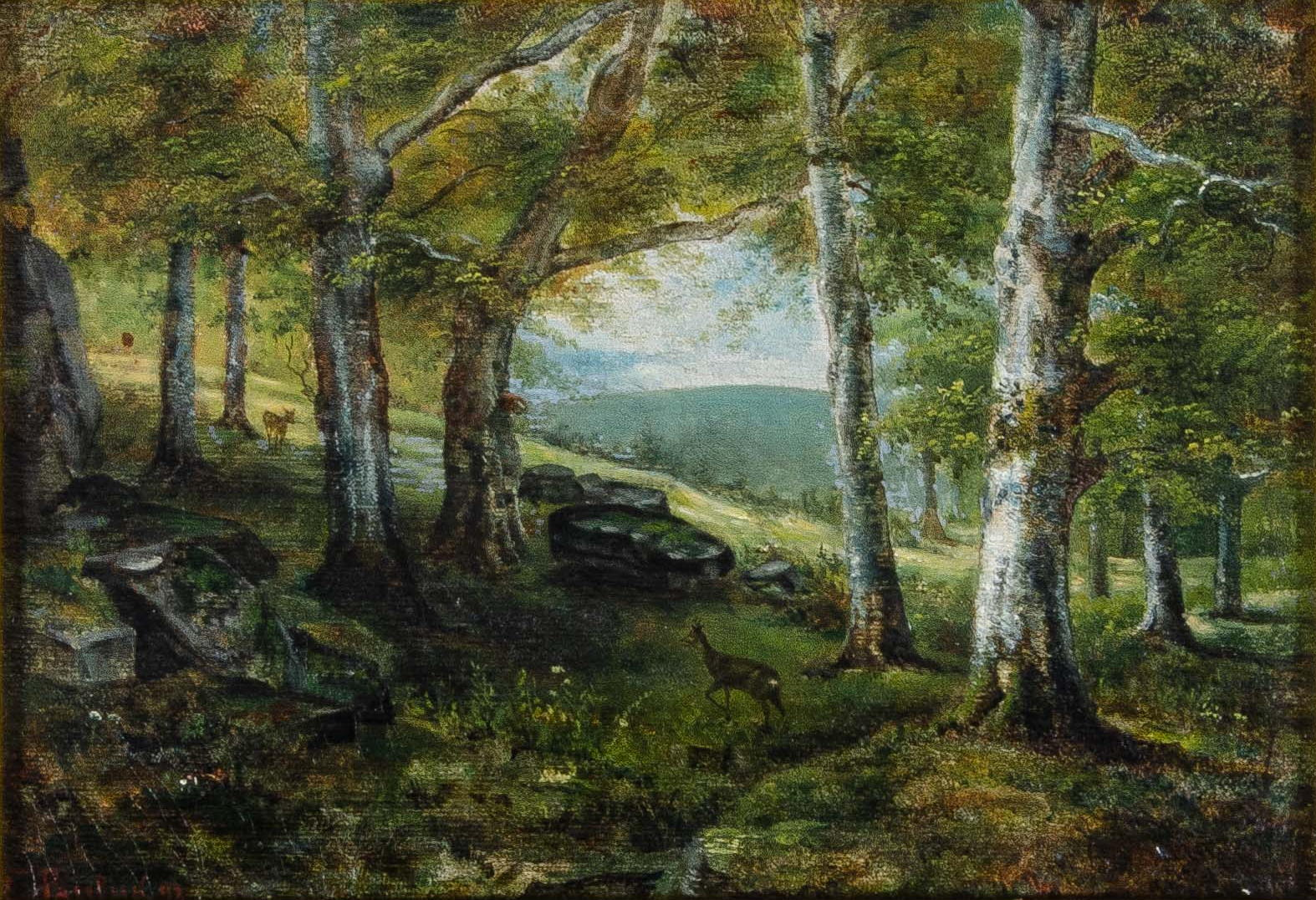
The artist's earliest known painting, signed and dated [18]91.

== World War I and after ==
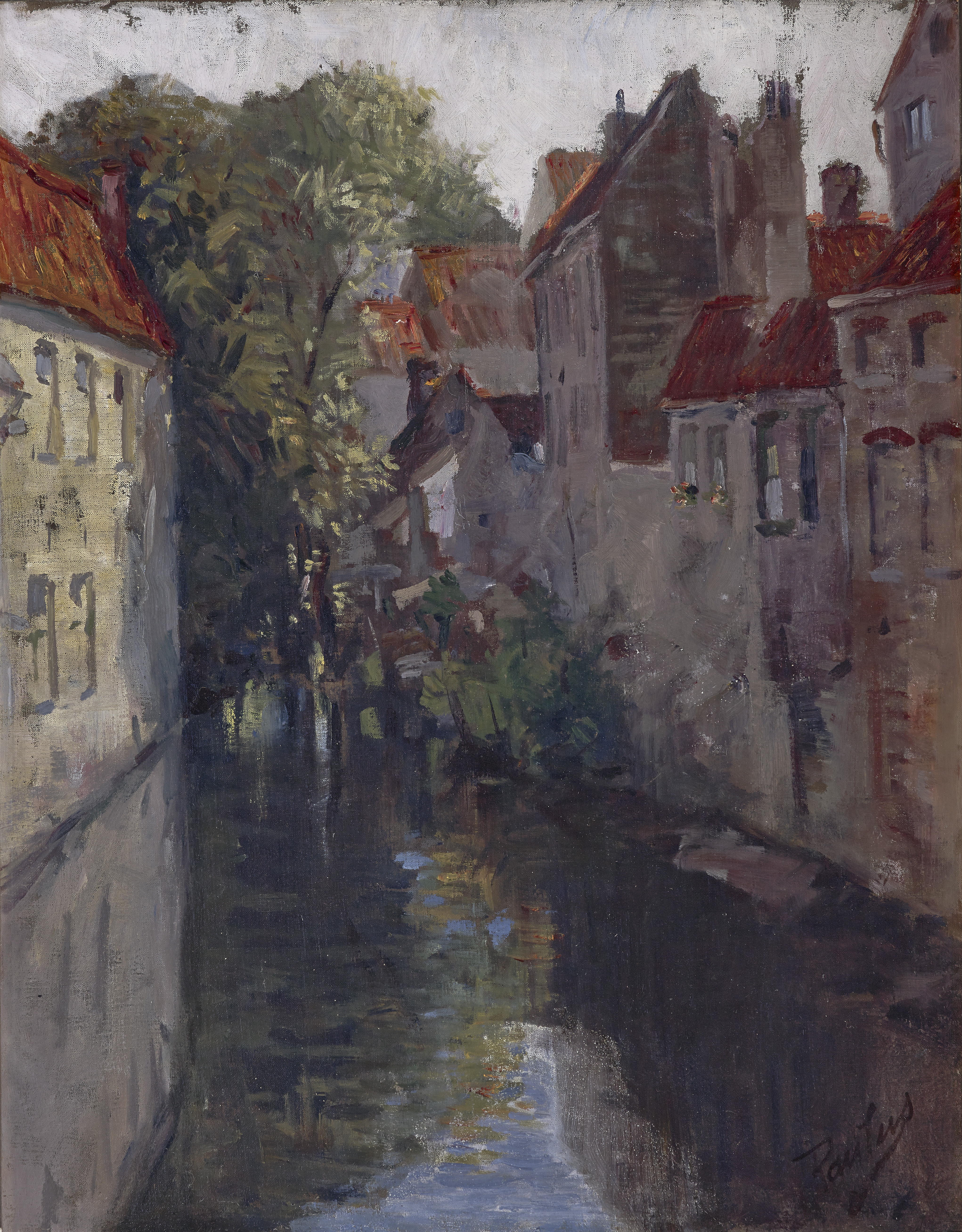
A Back Alley in Bruges, c. 1902, Indianapolis Museum of Art

Having fled the invasion of Belgium by Germany, Paulus returned to Detroit, where in February 1915 he had an exhibit at the Detroit Museum of Art of over fifty paintings, pastels, and etchings. For much of 1915, at the Panama-Pacific International Exhibition in San Francisco, work by Paulus was on view in the section devoted to Belgium, an exhibition that elicited great sympathy from the crowd for "valiant Belgium."

He remained in Michigan for the duration of the war, but found himself unable to work. "The great war…had a paralytic effect upon the art production of Mr. Paulus," who "agonized over the titanic struggle, feeling keenly the disasters, or jubilating over the victories as they were reported…For three years he waited for the inspiration which did not come." But as Allied victory loomed in Europe, "the artist in him blazed anew," inspired by "an enchanted isle full of resplendent color"—the scenery around Pointe aux Pins on Bois Blanc Island, in the Straits of Mackinac between Lake Michigan and Lake Huron. The result was an exhibition of thirty Recent Paintings of Northern Michigan at the Detroit Museum of Art in 1919.

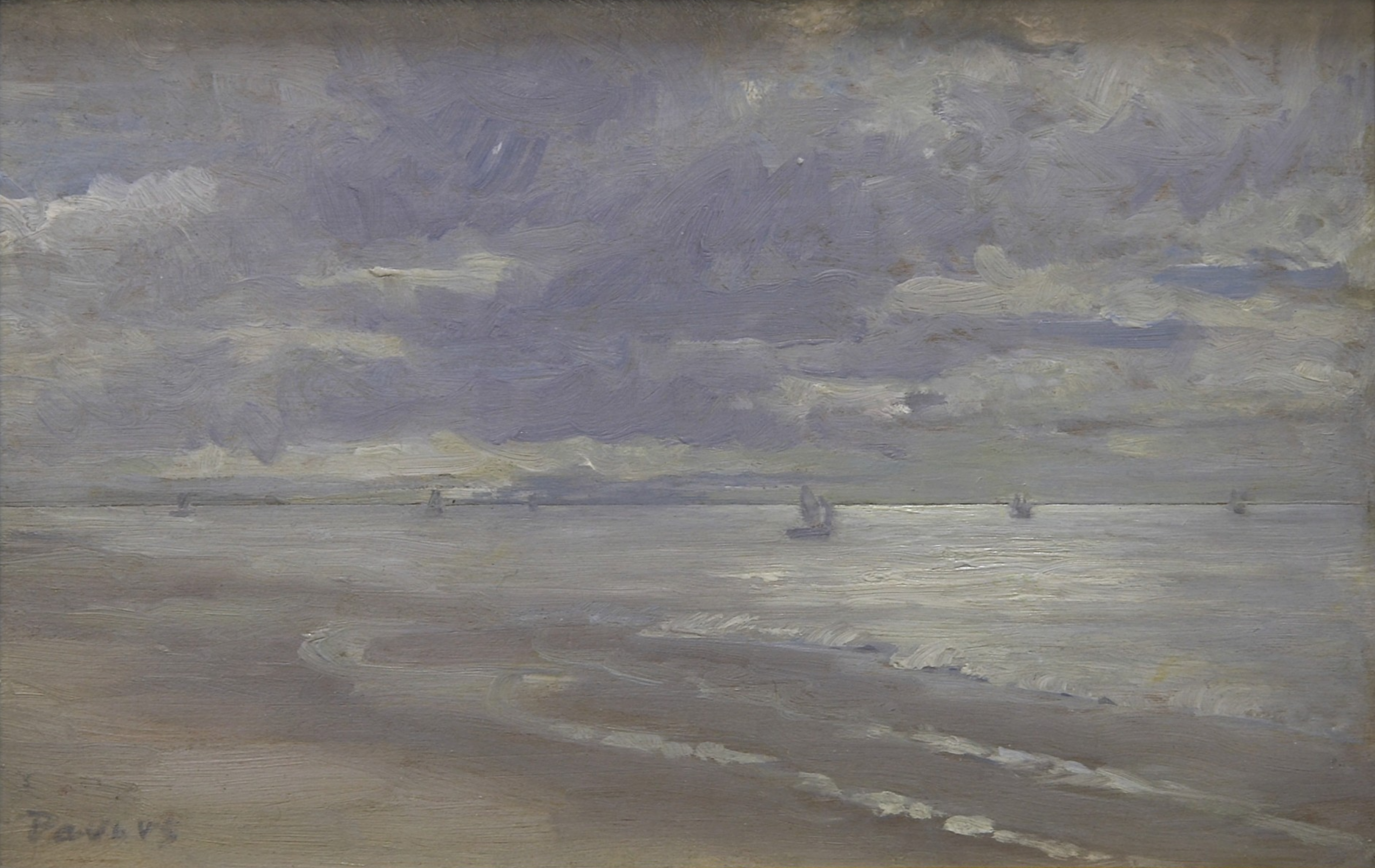
Low Tide, undated, Princeton University Art Museum

Noting the acquisition in 1920 of 36 etchings from all phases of his career, the Bulletin of the Detroit Institute of Arts said that "Paulus' etchings are marked by a command of his medium, a wide range of effects and a natural aptitude for the work," resulting in "the thin delicate soft line that, in the hands of the master, can produce an effect possible by no other means." Later that year the Institute acquired his painting Fish Market of Bruges, a work "characterized by a true artist's insight into the beauty of things," capturing the "atmospheric affect which pervades that medieval city and gives it its peculiar individuality."

After the war, Paulus resumed his visits to Bruges. In 1926, for his painting Fish Market, Bruges, he received the Detroit Museum of Art Founders Society Prize, and a profile in The American Magazine of Art called him "one of the artist-poets who have refused to compromise, who insists on painting what he loves and has the courage to stay in his frame, a mystic in a material age."

== Friendships and personal life ==
Among the artist's many professional and personal connections was his relationship with the British sculptor Alfred Gilbert. Seven years older than Paulus, in the 1890s Gilbert had become "the most famous sculptor in England" and "the foremost sculptor of his age," but in 1901 declared bankruptcy, fell into disgrace, and moved his family to Bruges.

It appears to be in this period, when Gilbert was at a low ebb and the younger Paulus was on the rise (he first exhibited at the Paris Salon in 1904), that the two Anglophone artists in Bruges became close friends and colleagues. When Paulus opened his art school in Bruges in 1905, an advertisement in The Studio promised that Gilbert would be an "honored visitor" at classes.

The two artists seemed to bring out the best in each other. When Gilbert sculpted a bust of Paulus, shown at the Royal Academy in London in 1906, the work received extravagant praise. The Art Journal wrote,

Mr. Alfred Gilbert's bust of Francis Petrus Paulus is remarkable for the sensitiveness of the modelling. If one were not afraid of the impulse of first impressions, one might regard it as a unique thing in its kind for the extraordinarily sensitive and nervous touch which it displays. It suggests something of the quality which one finds in the verse of Gérard de Nerval: it is the art of nerves, of the incessant striving after subtle and elusive achievement, something on the borderland of imagination.

The Academy wrote that the bust was endowed with "the divine spark. Certainly beside this tempestuous head and heaving breast all other busts seem tame and dead." On the other side of the Atlantic, The Nation wrote that the bust "has the distinction of life and vigor and character."

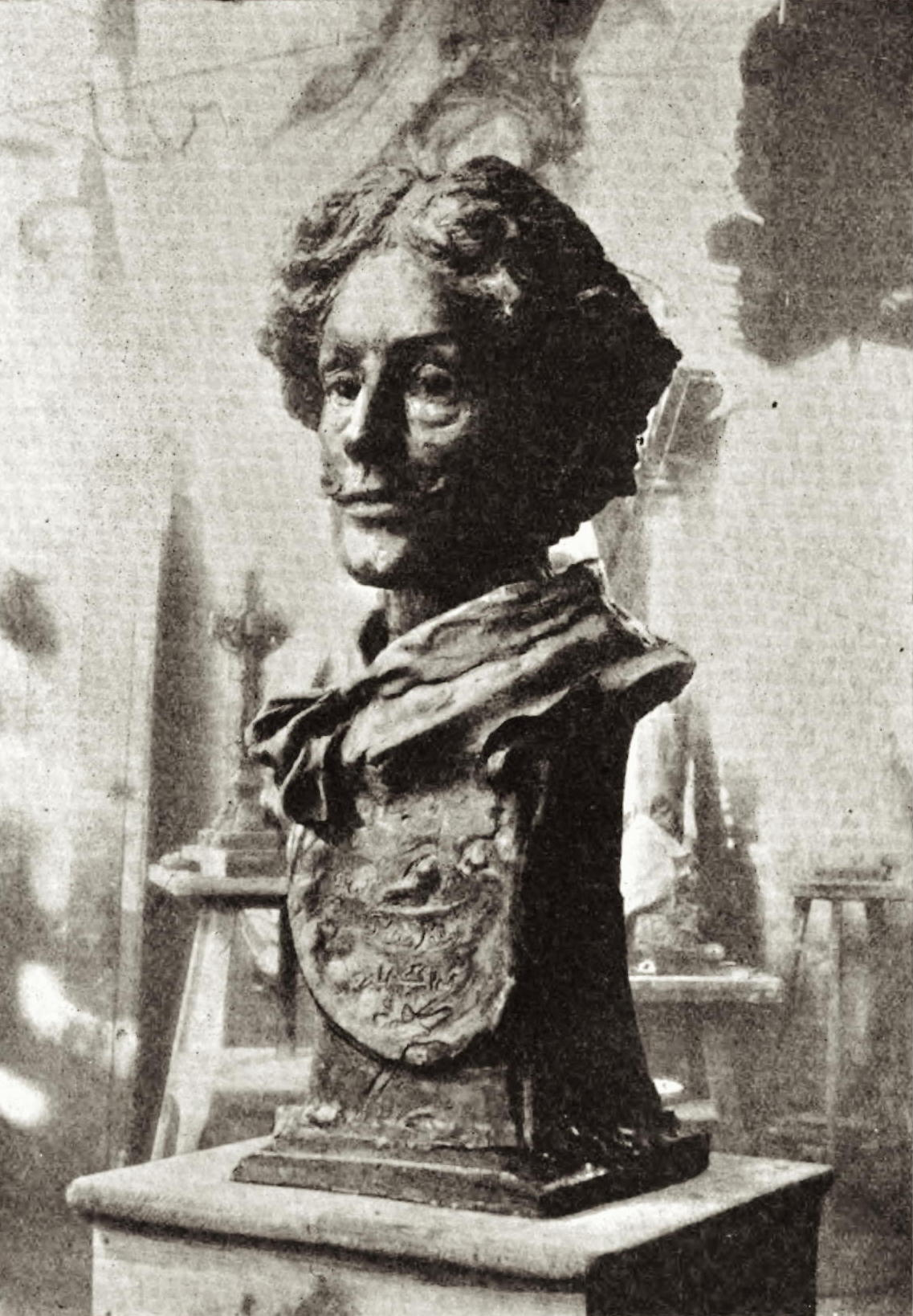
Gilbert, bust of Paulus, 1906.

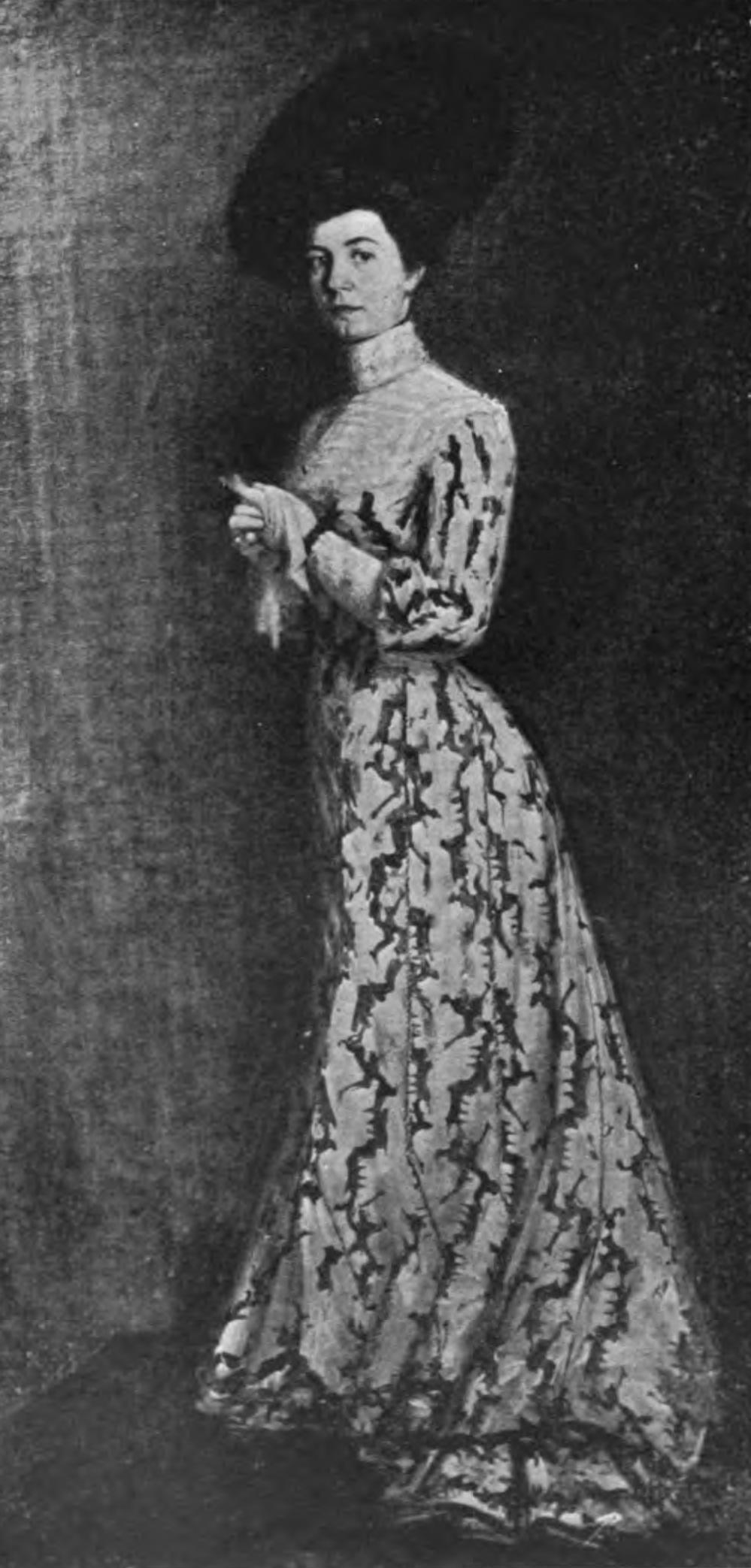
Paulus, Portrait of My Wife, by 1907.

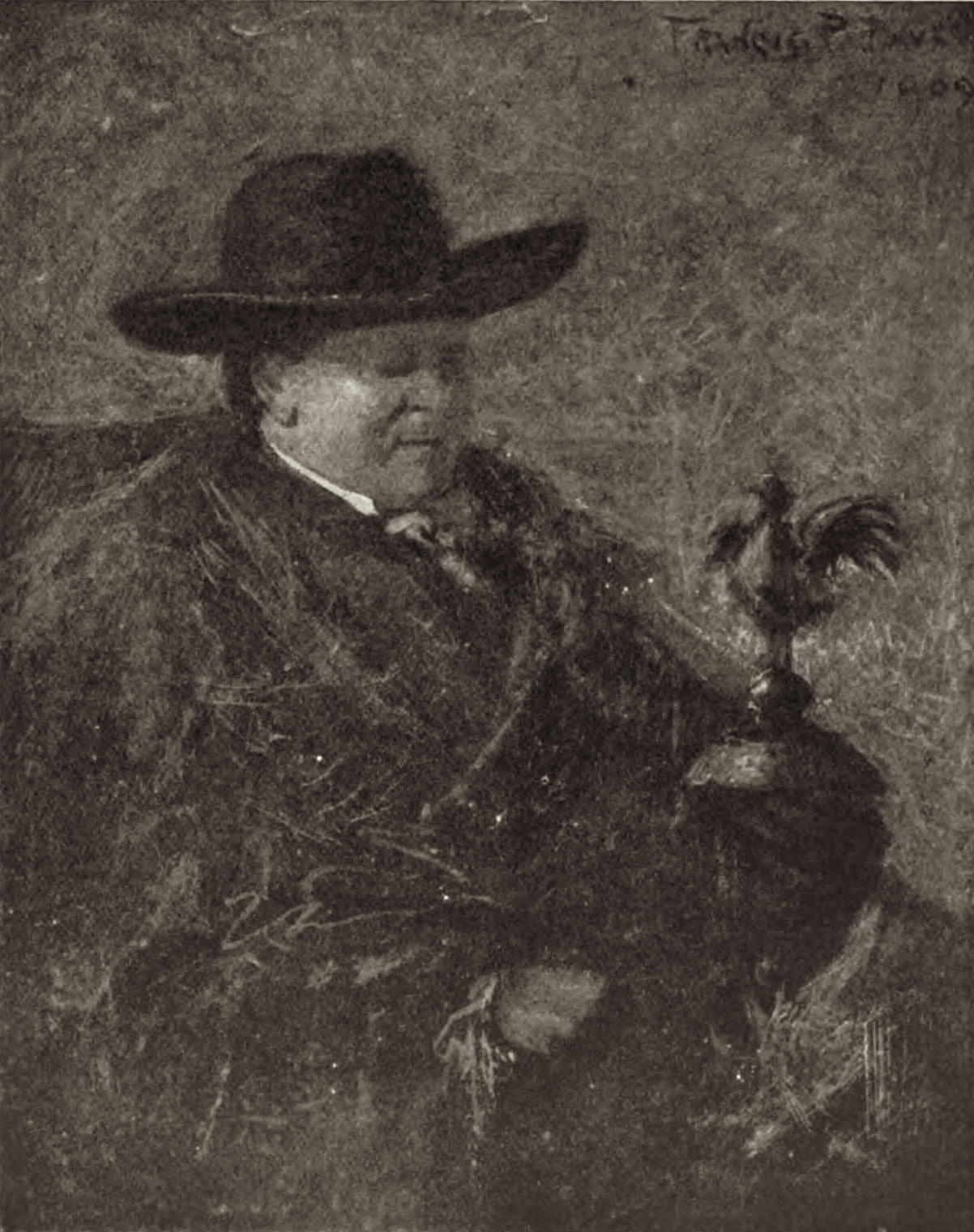
Paulus, portrait of Alfred Gilbert, 1909.

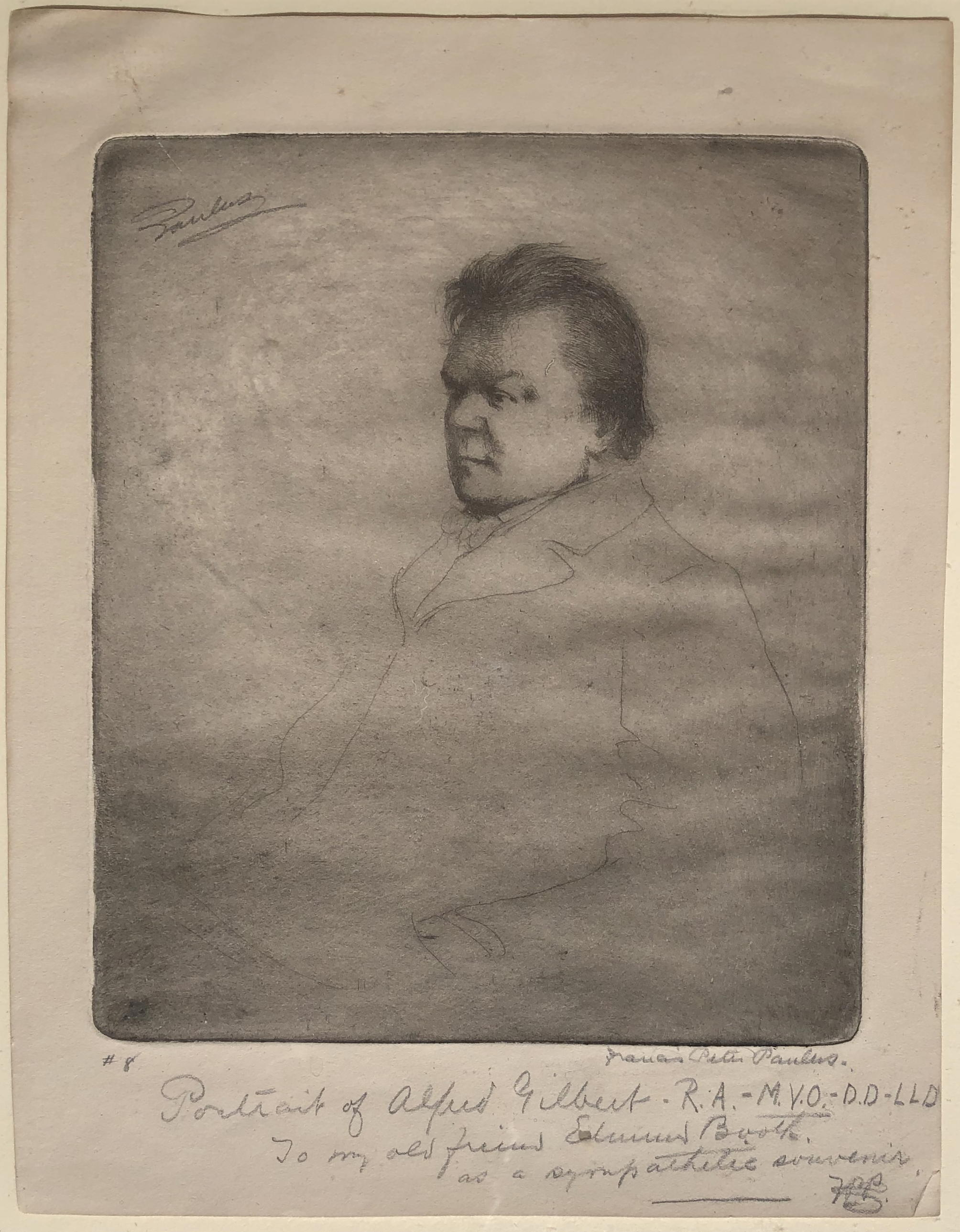
Paulus, etching of Alfred Gilbert, 1910, inscribed to Edmund Booth.

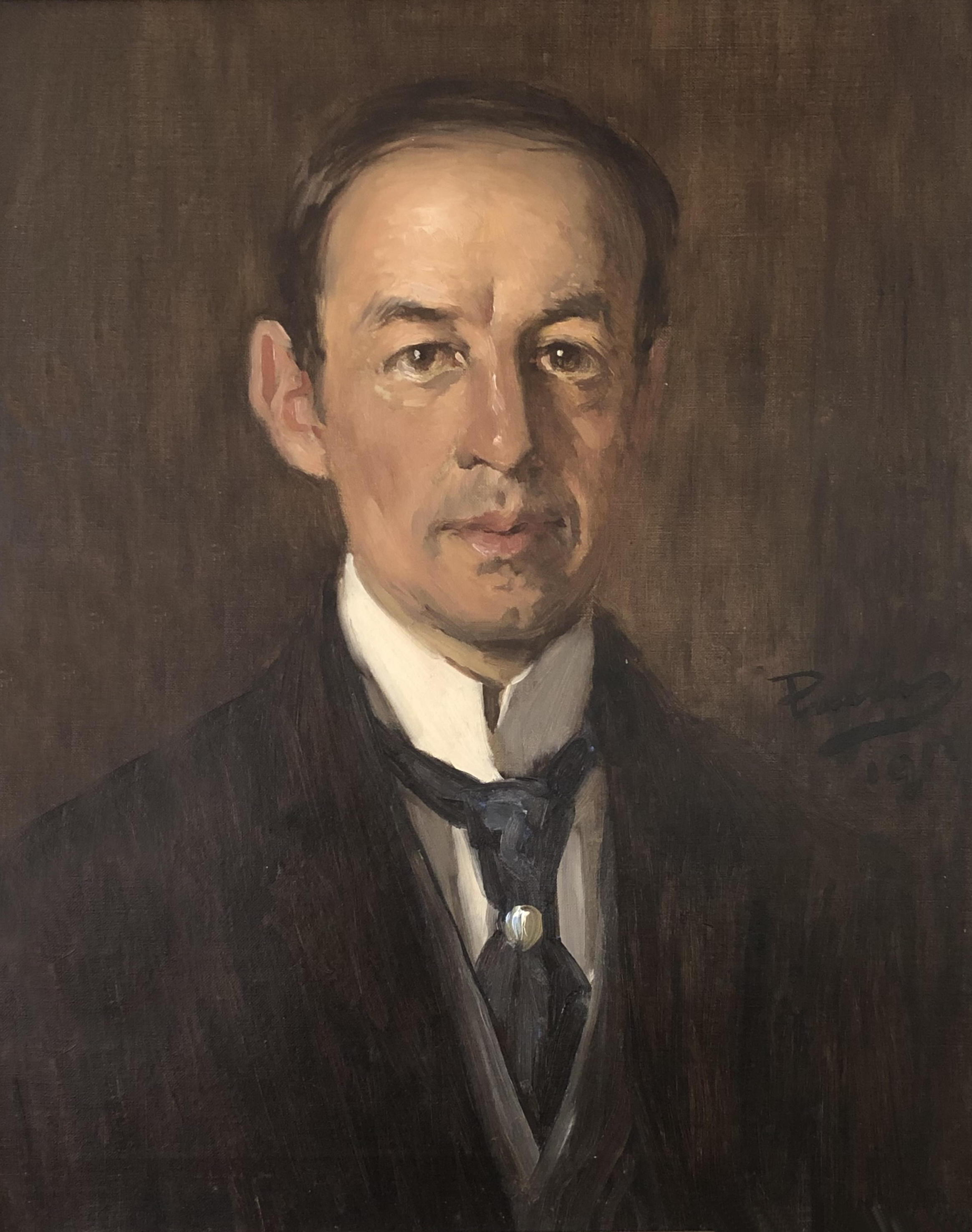
Paulus, portrait of Edmund Booth, 1911.

For his part, Paulus painted Gilbert's mother; the portrait was exhibited at the Paris Salon of 1907, the Exposition Générale des Beaux-Arts in Brussels in 1907, and The London Salon of 1908, and demonstrated "his keen appreciation of the subtler and finer phases of human nature, and he has ensured the presence of the deeper, the more abiding, and essential character of the subject." In 1909 Paulus painted Alfred Gilbert, and the result was "the most interesting portrait Mr. Paulus ever painted…a portrait which will certainly be handed down to posterity and fame." Paulus also executed an etching of Gilbert in 1910.

In 1912, the two artists held a joint exhibition at the gallery Le Salon in London, with Gilbert's bust of Paulus on prominent display. Coinciding with the exhibit, a profile of Paulus and his work in The Studio included a tipped-in facsimile of a hand-written testimonial signed by Gilbert, which reads in part:

Francis Petrus Paulus, though an American by birth, may claim to be a veritable citizen of the World, for he can discourse most eloquently through his art, without opening his lips. His work, which is suggestive rather than didactic, is yet so replete with health and vigour, that it never fails to instruct, as well as charm, and it is hoped that ere long his name will be added to the distinguished list of artists England is so proud to welcome from America.

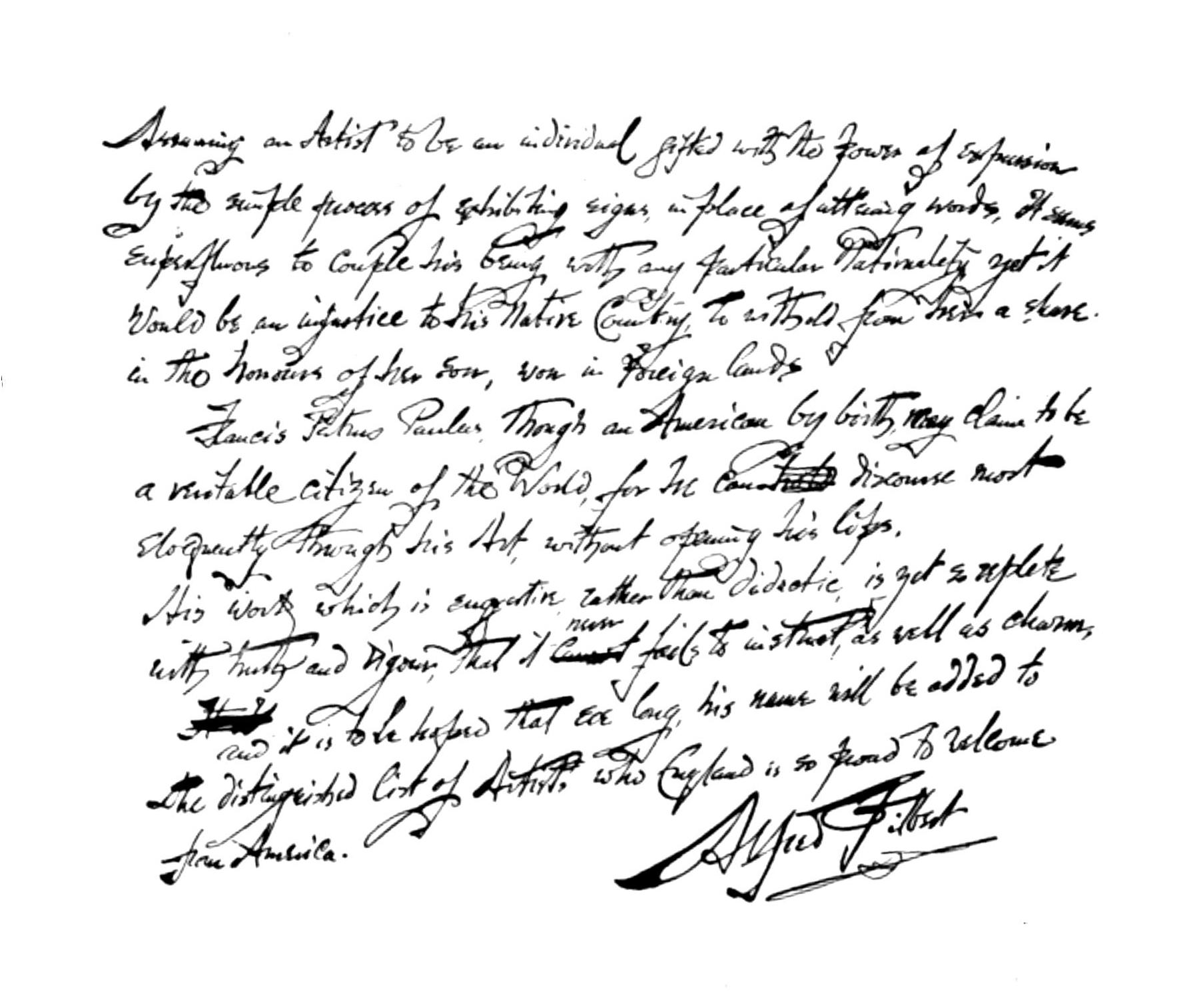
Alfred Gilbert's testimonial to Paulus, The Studio, March 1912

Another family friend was the American journalist and newspaper executive Edmund Wood Booth, whose portrait Paulus painted in 1911. Etchings inscribed and gifted to "my old friend Edmund Booth" and to his children Esther and Ted by Paulus and his wife Adele indicate the families knew one another in both Michigan and Belgium.

Paulus married Adele Frutig, born 1883, who was Swiss and whom he considered "his best critic," in 1903. She died in 1929.

On February 2, 1933, Paulus "died of a heart attack shortly after 5 o'clock...in his studio residence, 917 E. Jefferson Ave." in Detroit.

== Gallery ==
=== Etchings ===
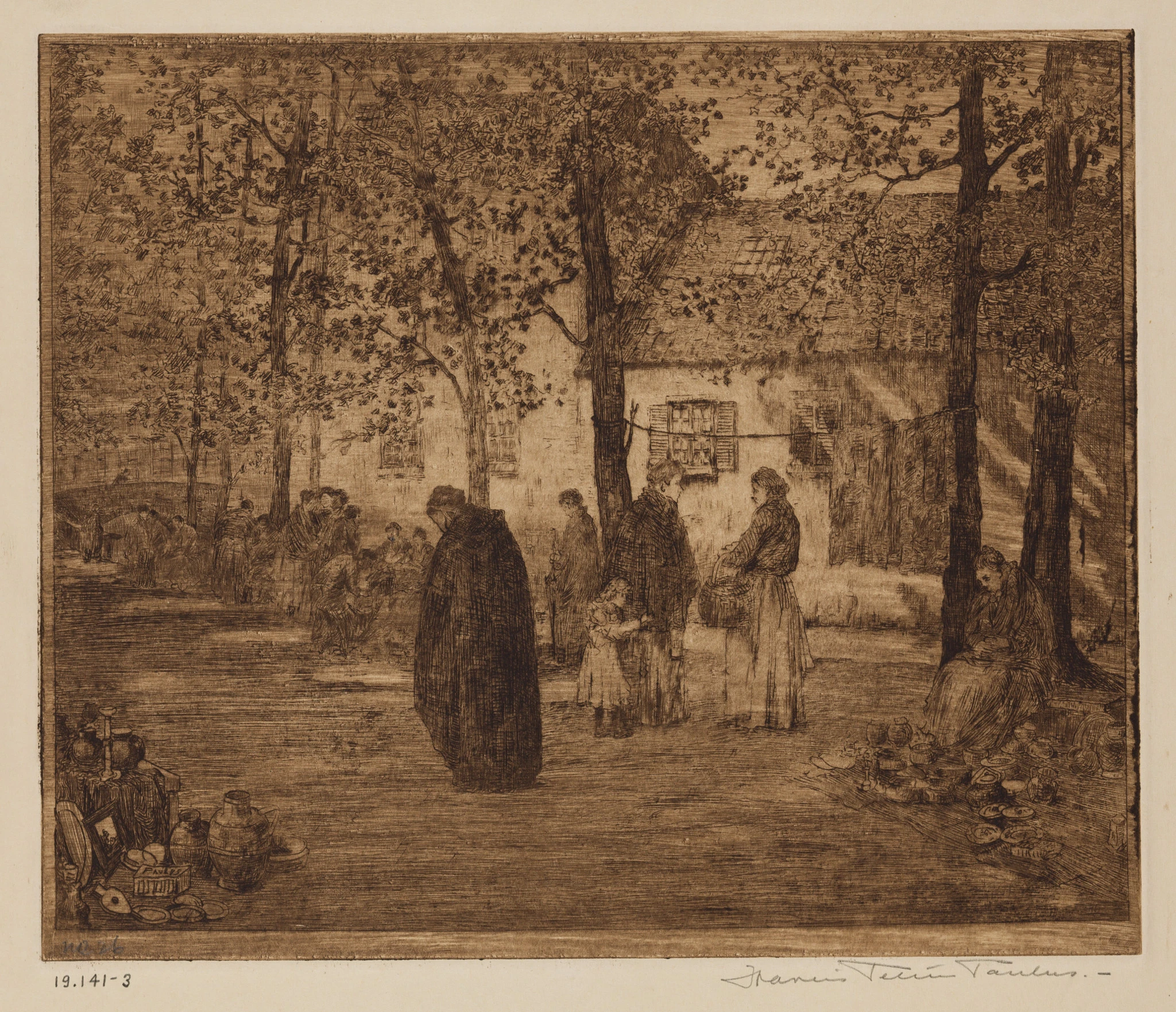
Market under the Trees

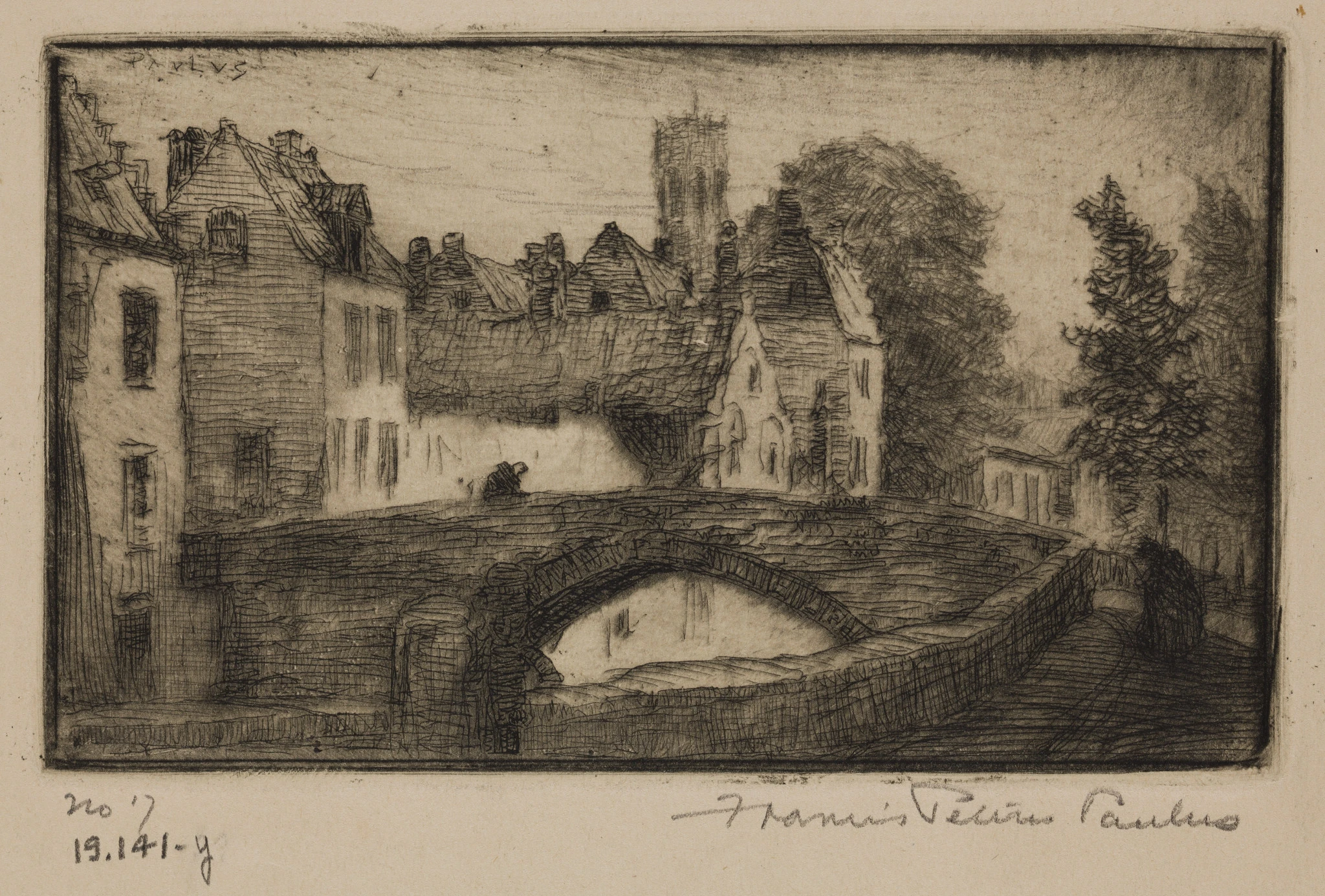
Quai Vert, Bruges

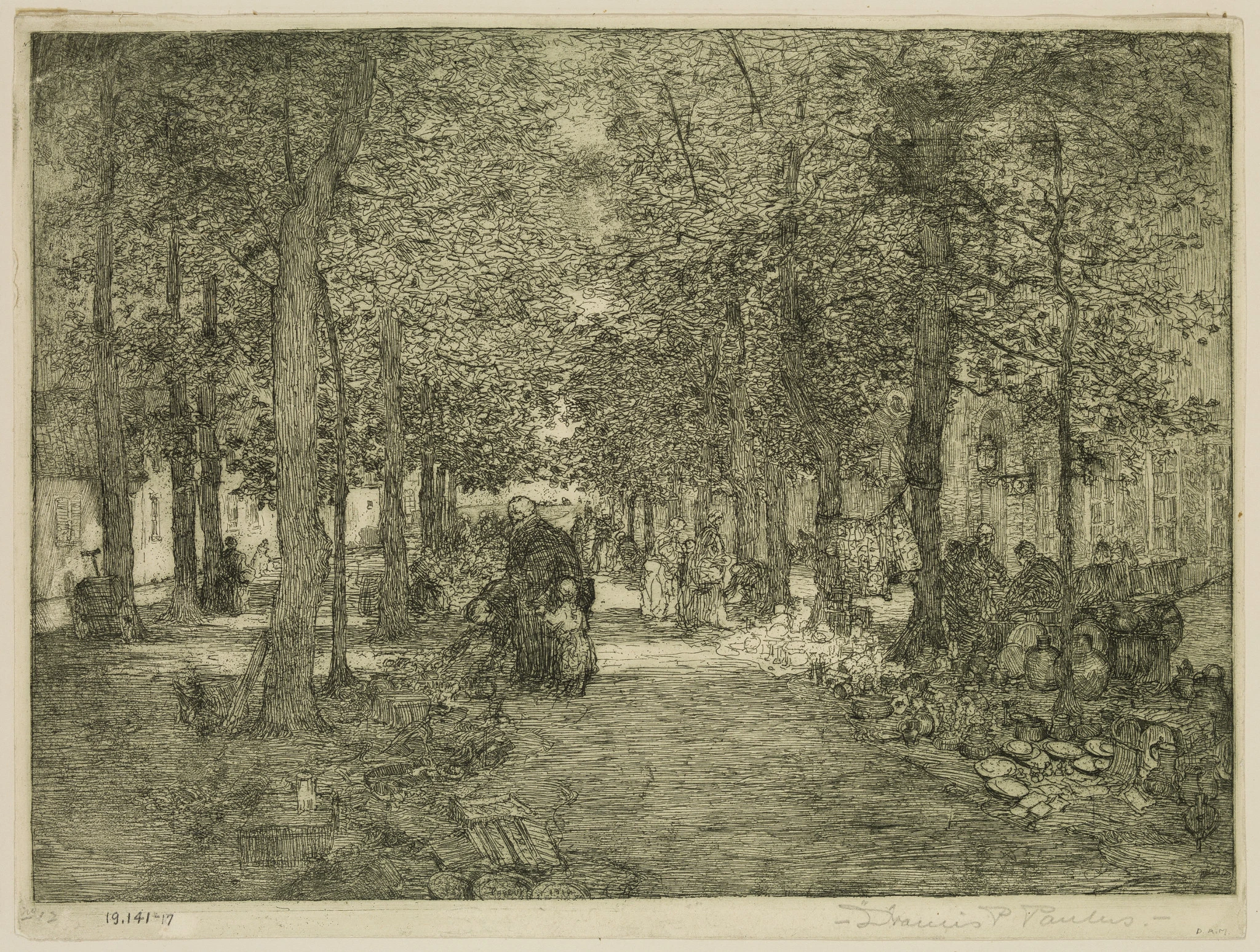
Sunshine and Shadow

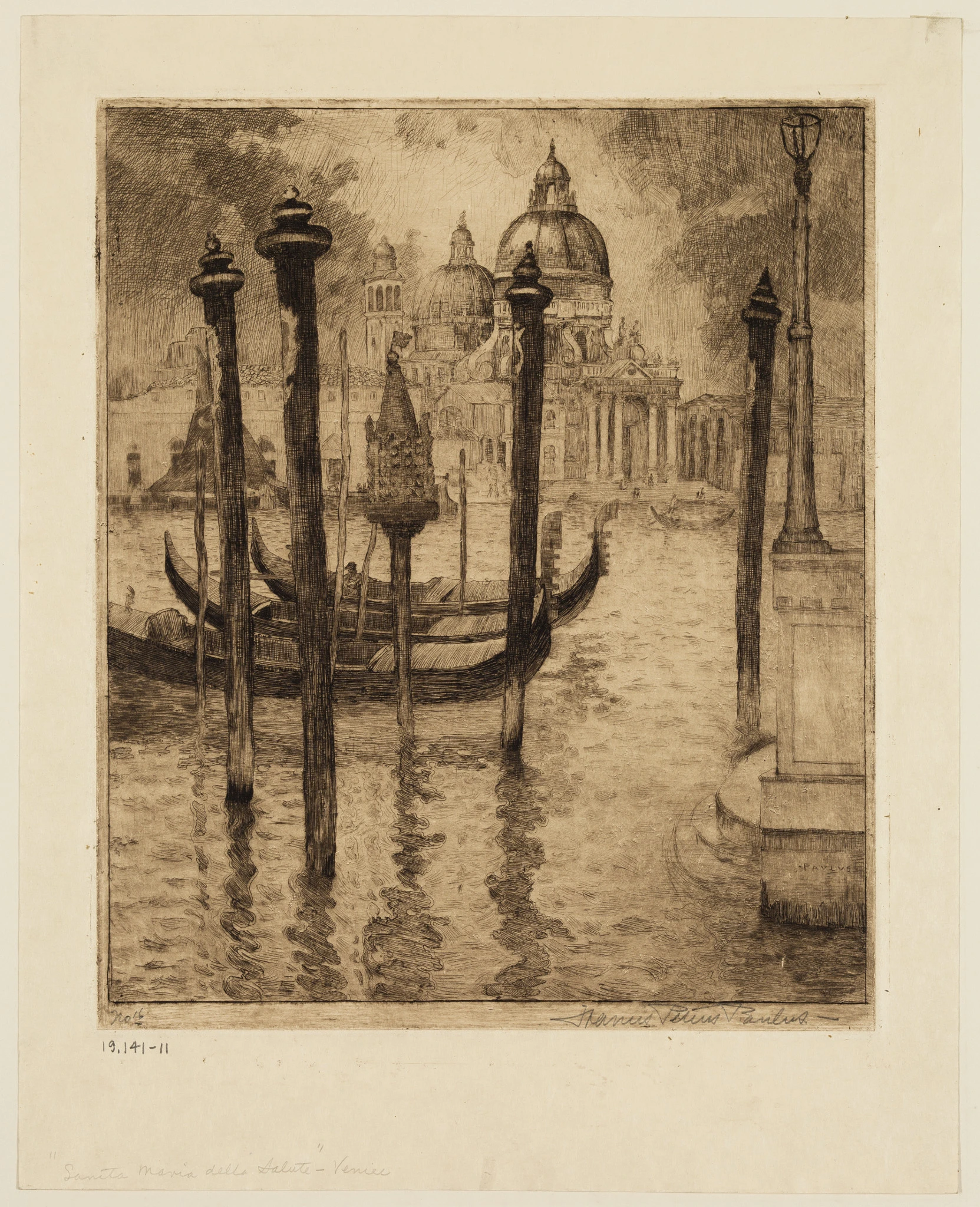
Santa Maria della Salute, Venice

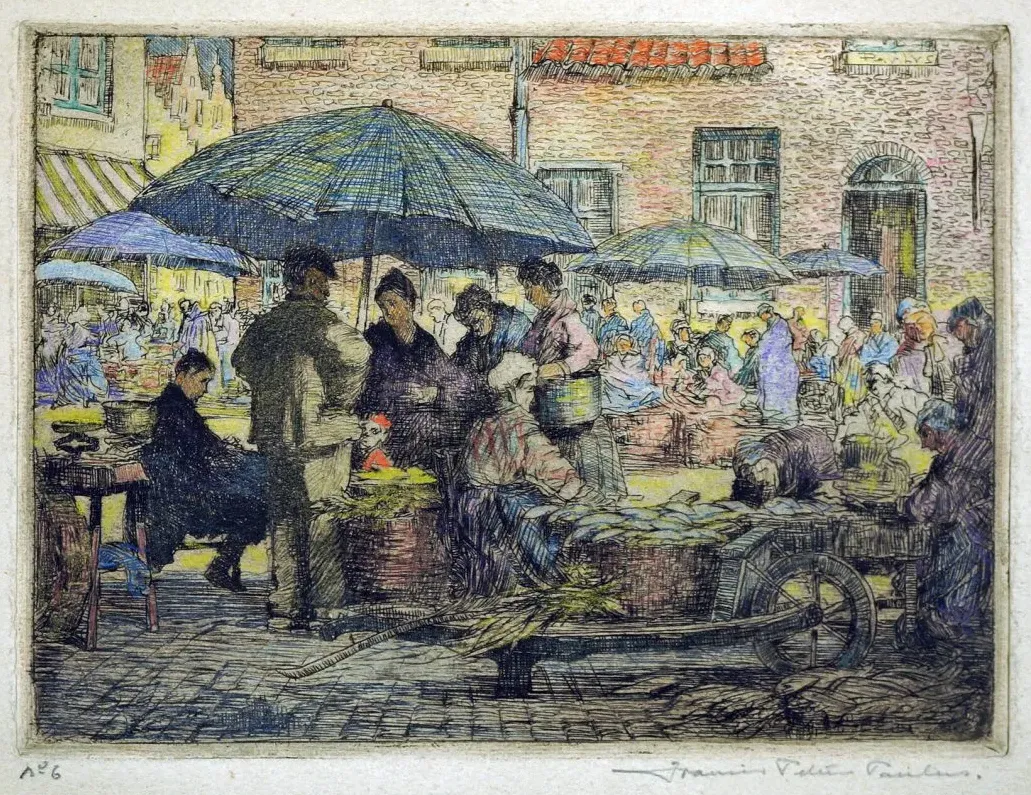
Fish Market, Bruges (hand-colored)

=== Paintings ===
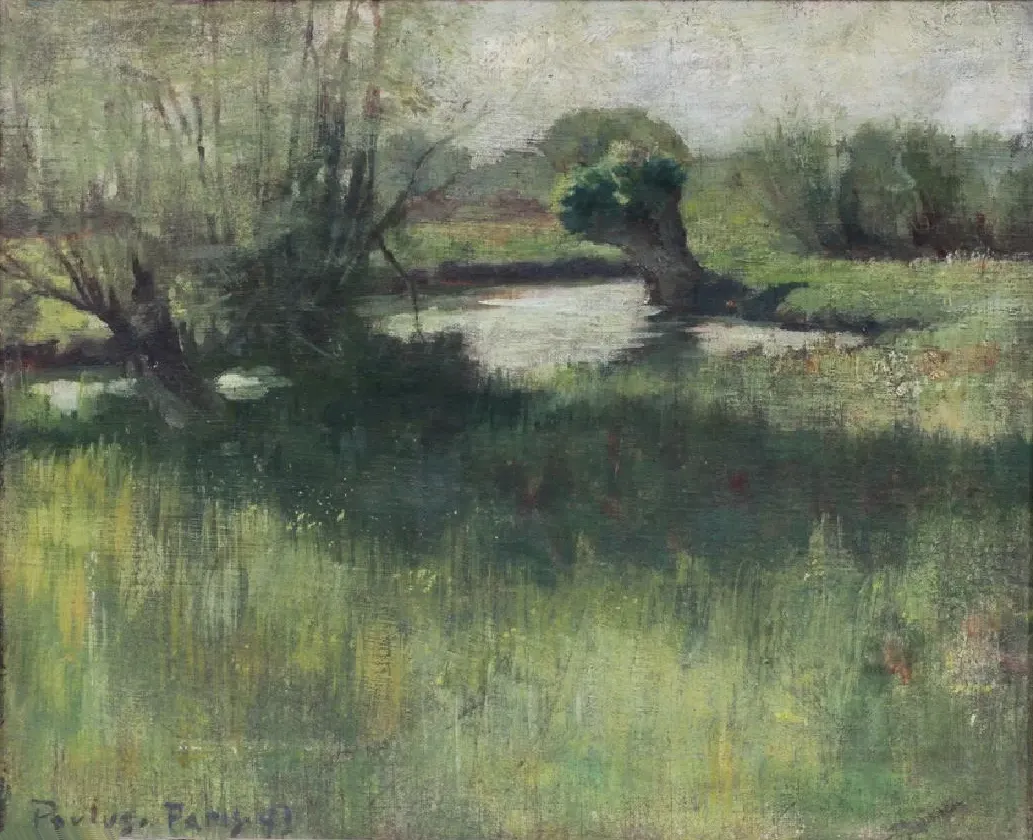
Landscape signed "Paulus Paris 93"

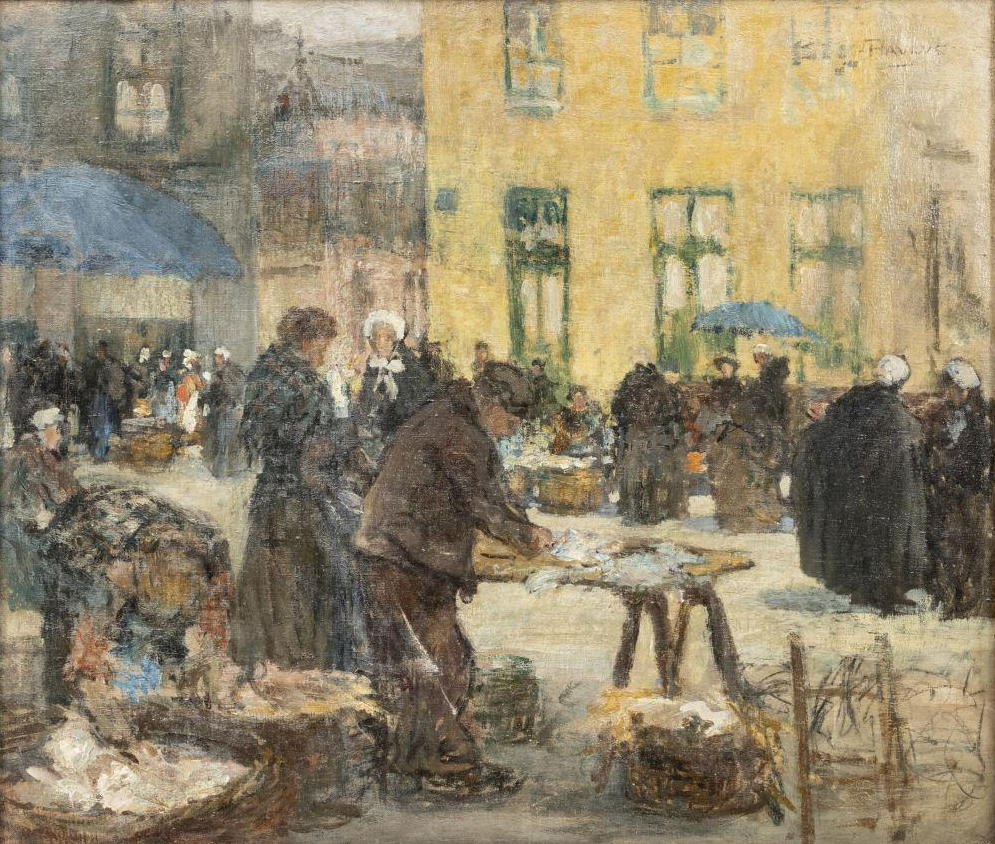
A Bruges market scene

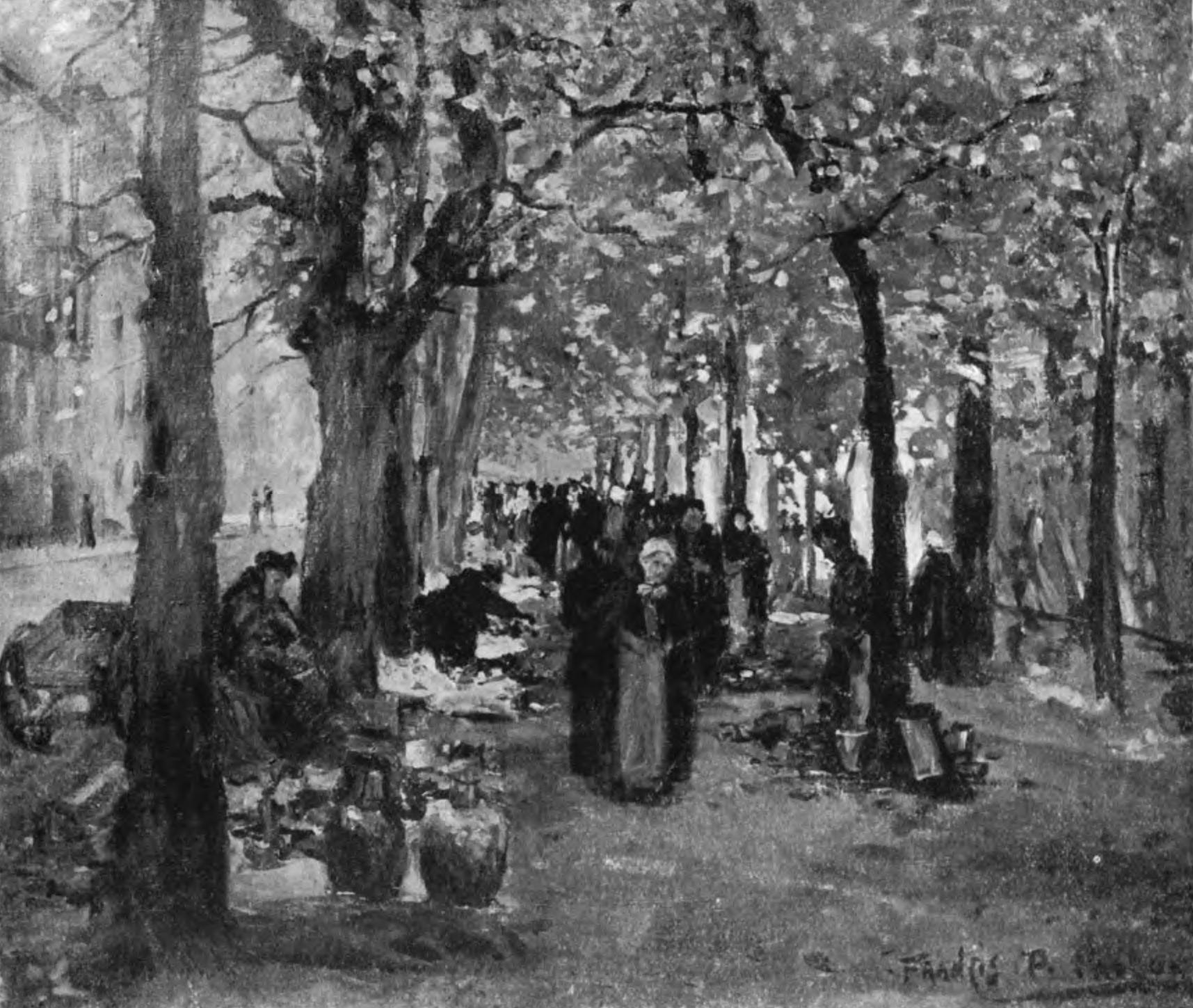
Old Market under the Trees, Bruges, by 1912

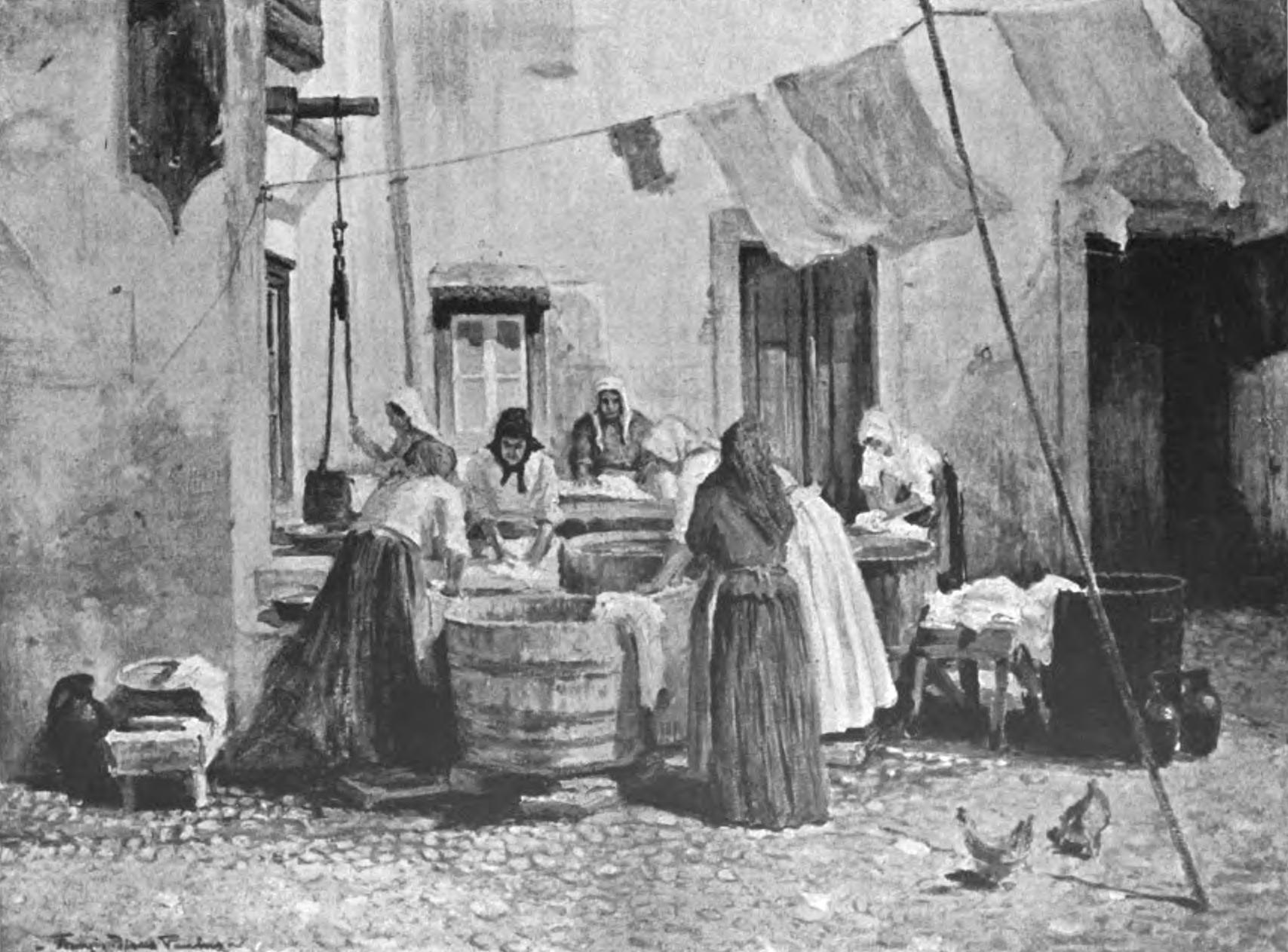
Work and Gossip, Lisbon, Portugal, by 1912

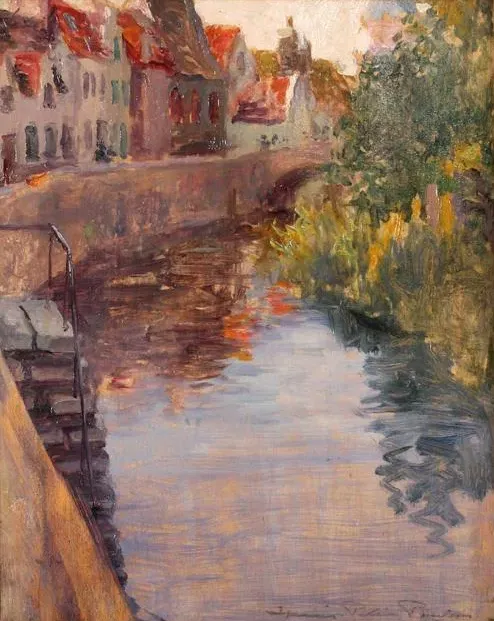
Sketch painting of a canal in Bruges

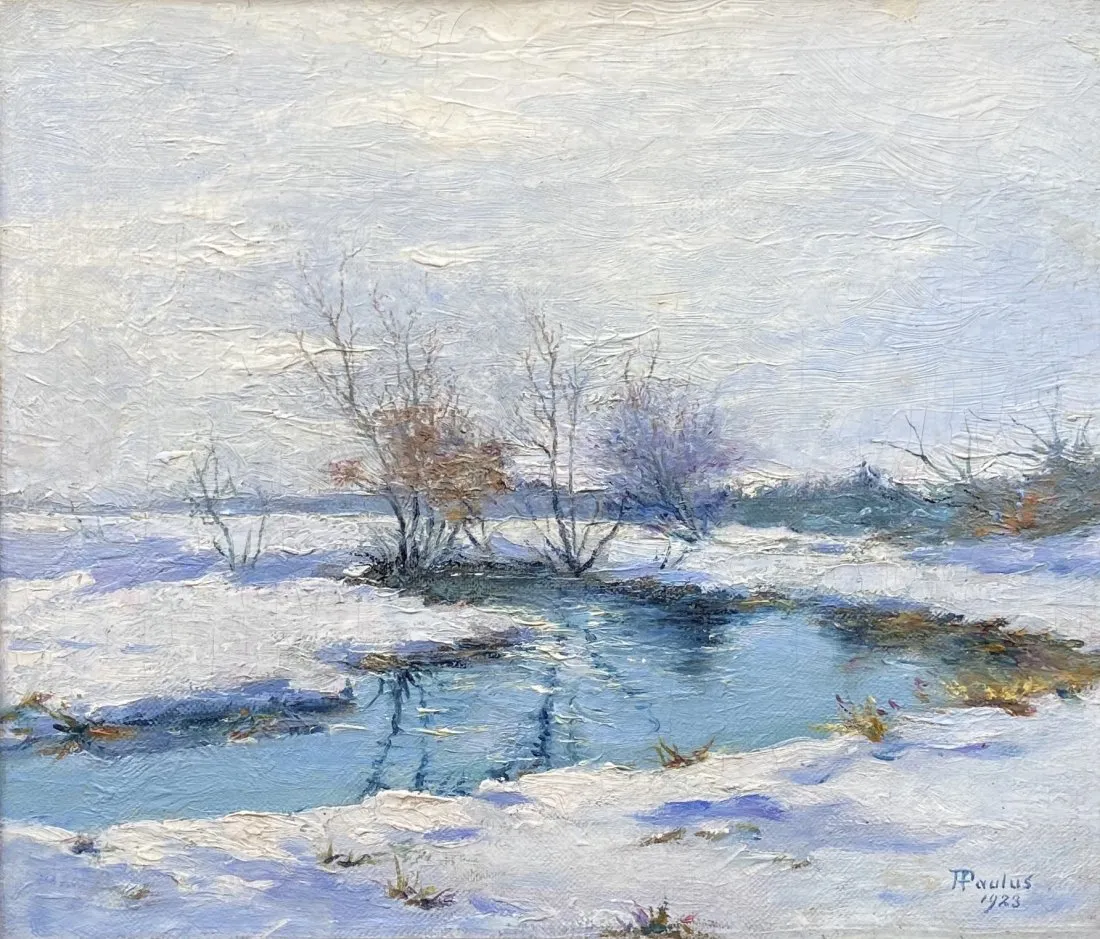
Winter landscape, 1923

=== Portraits ===
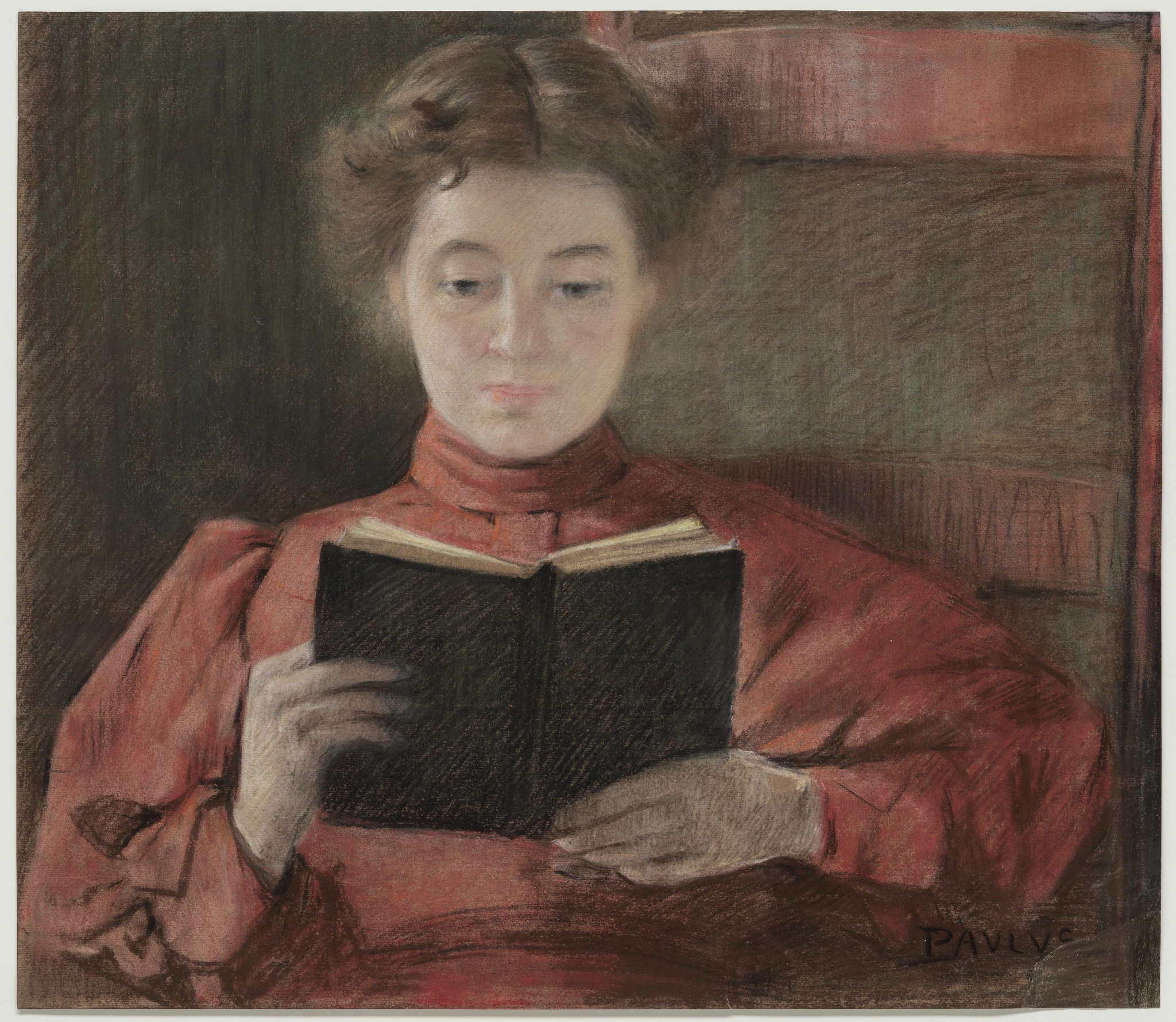
Mary Chase Stratton, pastel, c. 1900

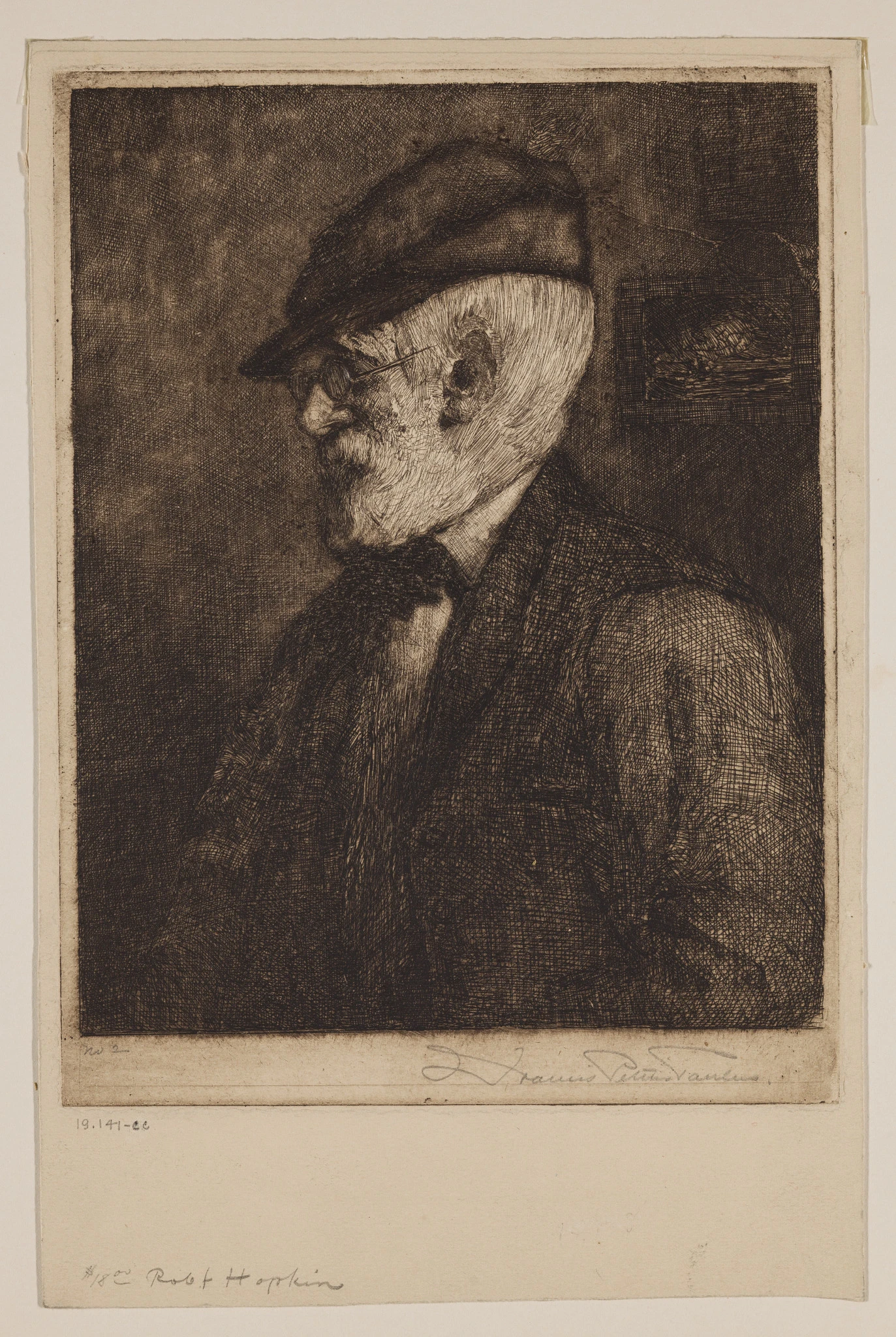
Robert Hopkin, by 1909

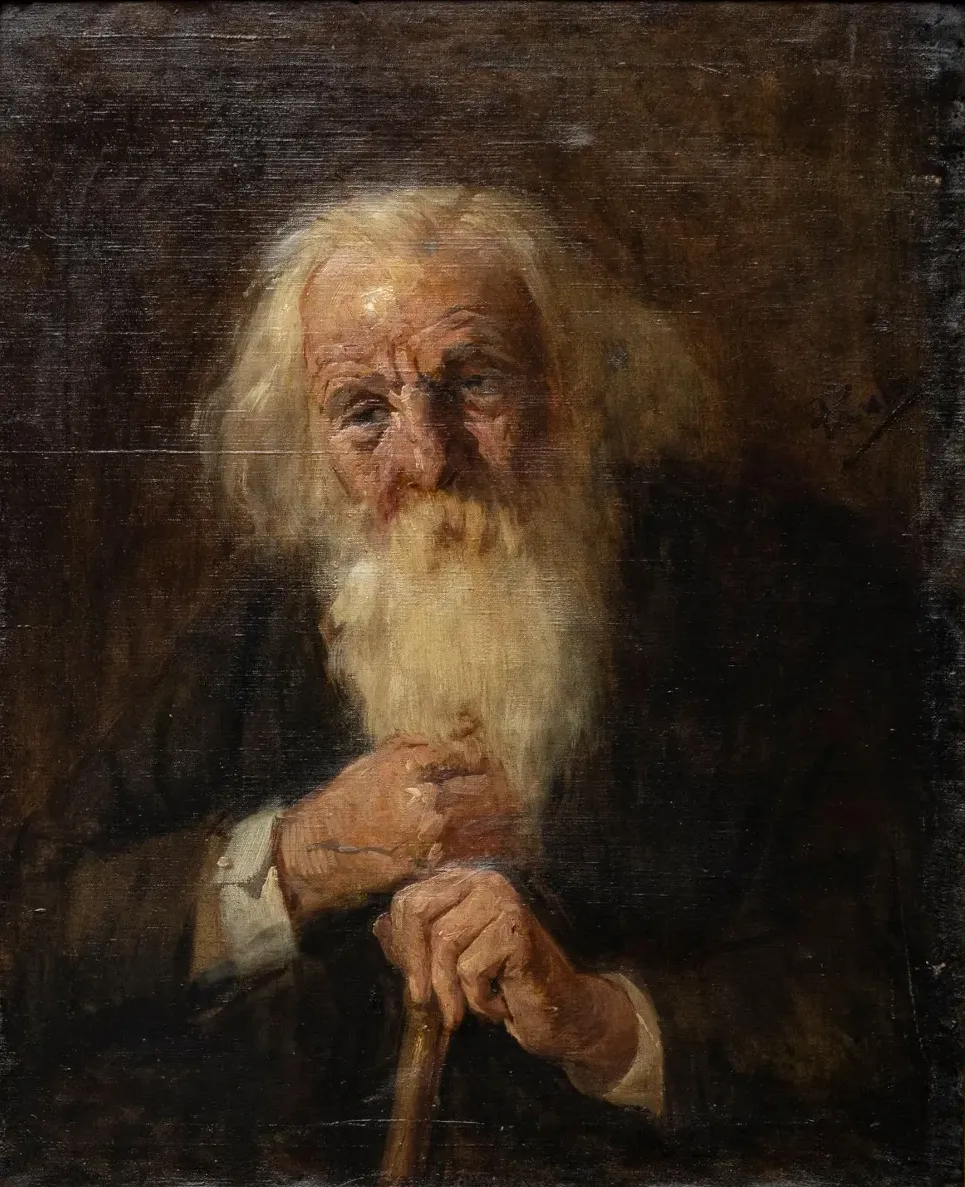
The Old Philosopher, by 1912

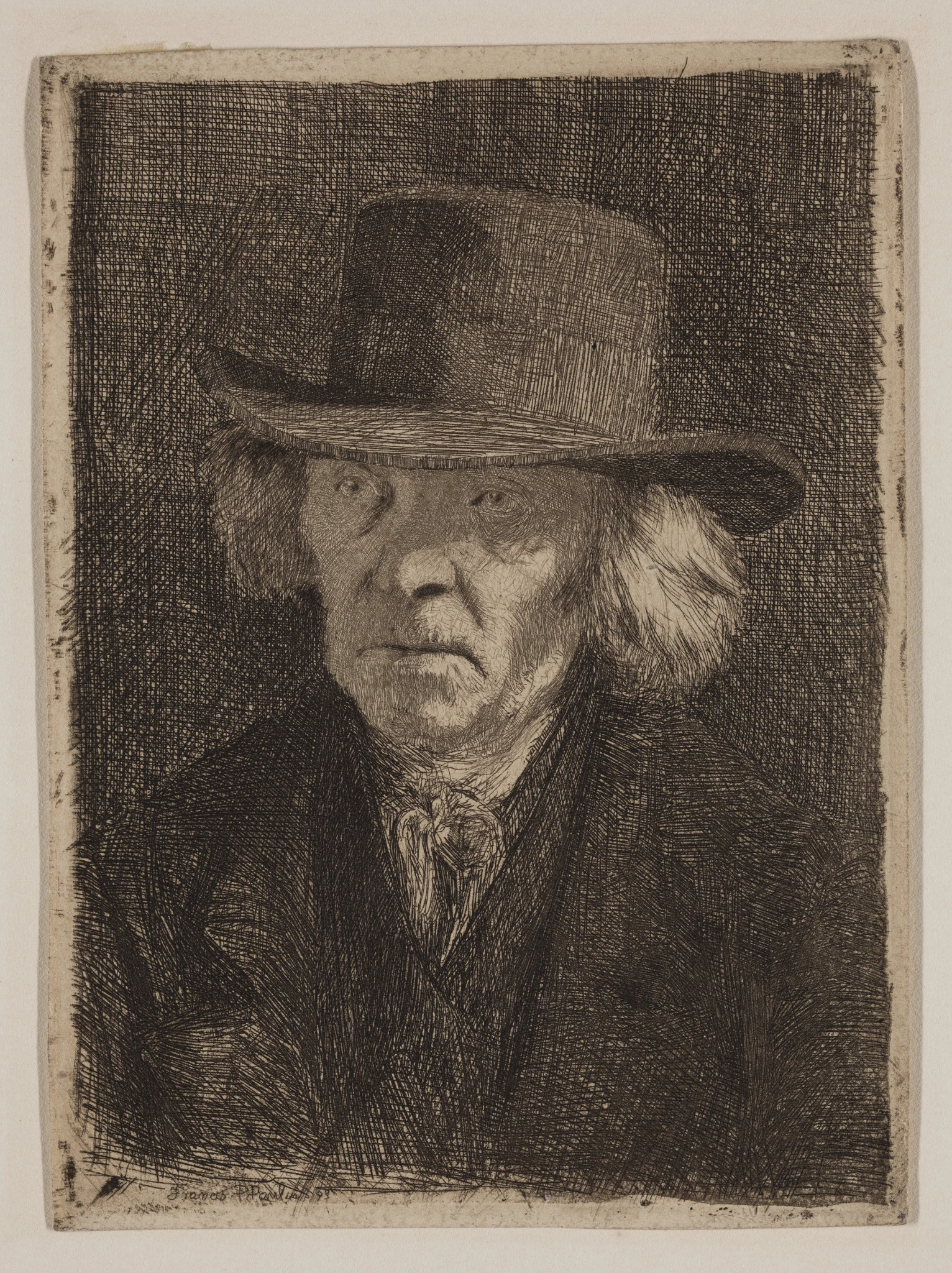
Head of an Old Man

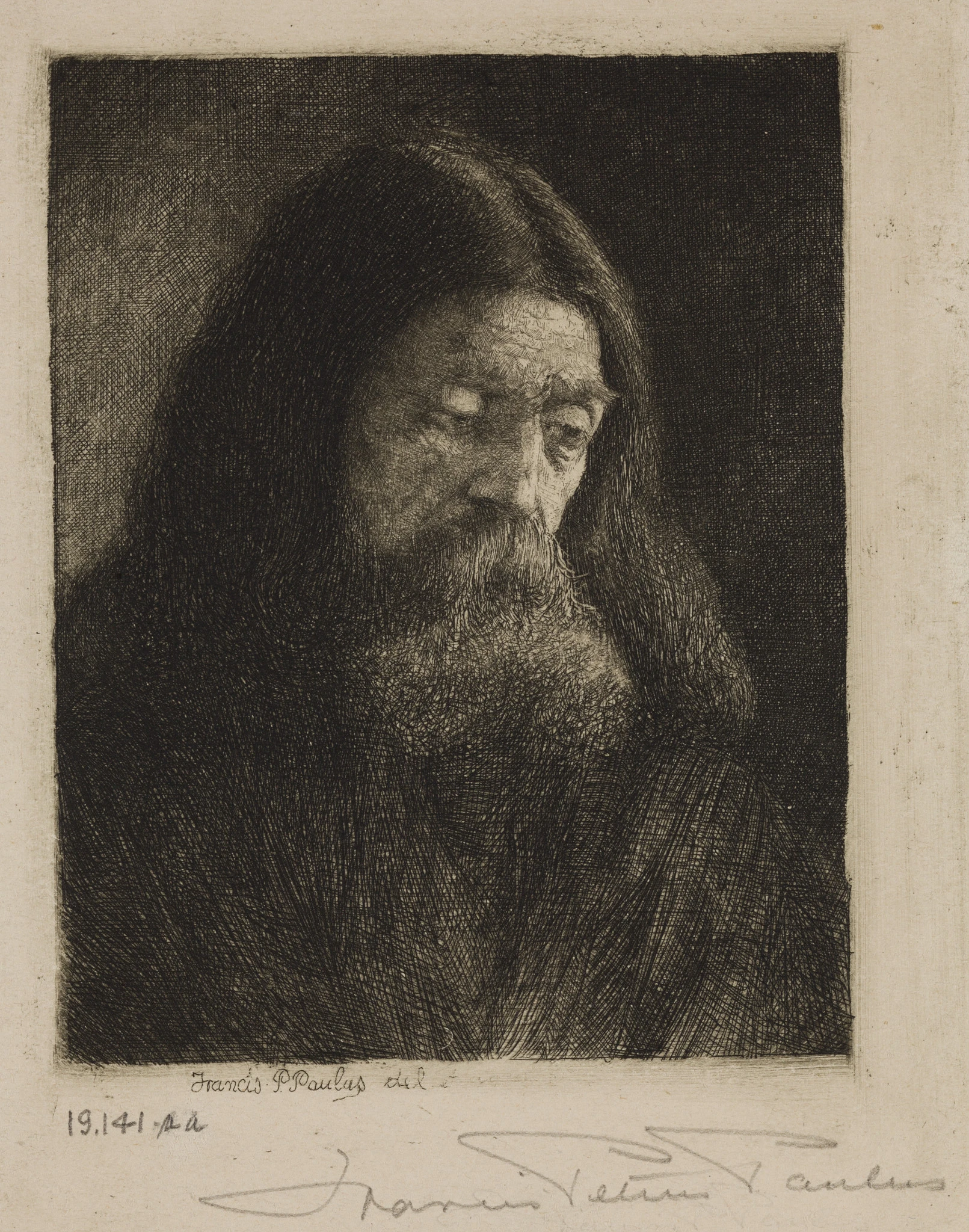
The Old Philosopher

== Sources ==
=== Obituaries ===
- "Francis Paulus Dies; Painter and Etcher; Former Associate Director of Detroit Art Academy Succumbs to Heart Attack at 71", The New York Times, February 4, 1933, p. 15.
- "Francis Paulus Dies in Studio; Famed as a Painter and Etcher", Detroit Free Press, February 3, 1933, p. 1.
- "Francis P. Paulus", The Art News, vol 31, no. 20, February 11, 1933, p. 8.

=== By title (items with no byline) ===
- "Alfred Gilbert and Francis Petrus Paulus", The Art Chronicle, vol. 8, June 28, 1912, p. 357.
- Bruges, ses Peintres: Exposition Internationale de Beaux-Arts, catalogue of an exhibition held July 15-September 15, 1908, Bruges: Imp. Herreboudt, 1908[?]; Paulus entry (unnumbered page).
- "Accessions", Bulletin of the Detroit Institute of Arts of the City of Detroit, vol. 1, vol. 8 (May 1920), p. 127-128.
- "Accessions to the Print Department", Bulletin of the Detroit Institute of Arts of the City of Detroit, vol. 1, no. 5 (February, 1920), pp. 80–82, 77.
- Catalogue of Recent Paintings of Northern Michigan by Francis P. Paulus, pamphlet with foreword and list of 33 works exhibited at the Detroit Museum of Art, February 1–28, 1919.
- Exhibition of Paintings by Francis Petrus Paulus, pamphlet with brief biography and list of 55 works in the exhibition at the Detroit Museum of Art, February 8–28, 1915.
- Exposition Générale des Beaux-Arts, Bruxelles: Des Presses de A. Lesigne, 1907, Paulus entries, p. 35 and p. 65.
- Exposition Générale des Beaux-Arts, Bruxelles: Monnom, 1914, Paulus entry, p. 102.
- "Francis Paulus Winning Honors in Europe", Detroit Free Press, August 22, 1909, p. 51.
- "Francis Petrus Paulus" (advertisement), The Studio, vol. 36, no. 151, October 14, 1905, p. xviii.
- The London Salon of the Allied Artists' Association, Ltd., 1908, catalogue of an exhibition held at the Royal Albert Hall, London, July 1908; Paulus entry, p. 46.
- The London Salon of the Allied Artists' Association, Ltd., 1909, catalogue of an exhibition held at the Royal Albert Hall, London, July 1909; Paulus entry, p. 61.
- "The Royal Academy—II", The Academy, May 26, 1906, pp. 504–506.

=== By author ===
- Buchanan, James A. and Stuart, Gail, editors. History of the Panama-Pacific International Exposition…at San Francisco, 1915, San Francisco: Pan-Pacific Press Association, Ltd., 1916[?]; Paulus mention, p. 97.
- Burroughs, Clyde H. "A Painting by Thomas Eakins", Bulletin of the Detroit Institute of Arts of the City of Detroit, vol. 14, no. 7 (April, 1935), pp. 86–88.
- Dircks, Rudolf. "The Royal Academy", The Art Journal, vol. 68, 1906, pp. 160–172.
- Dorment, Richard (1985). Alfred Gilbert. New Haven and London: Paul Mellon Centre for Studies in British Art, Yale University Press, 1985.
- Dorment, Richard (2004). "Gilbert, Sir Alfred", Oxford Dictionary of National Biography, Oxford University Press, 2004.
- Dunbar, Willis Frederick. Michigan Through the Centuries, New York: Lewis Historical Publishing Co., 1955, vol. 2, p. 446.
- Kirkpatrick, Sidney D. The Revenge of Thomas Eakins, New Haven : Yale University Press, 2006.
- McA., J.G. [possibly Isabel Geraldine McAllister, if the initial "J" is a misprint.] "Studio-Talk", The Studio, vol. 55, no. 228, March 1912, pp. 141–145.
- McAllister, I.G. [Isabel Geraldine; Dorment (1985), p. 304, gives her full name.] "The Art of Francis Petrus Paulus", The English Illustrated Magazine, vol. 47, August 1912, pp. 410–419.
- N.N. "The Royal Academy", The Nation, vol. 82, no. 2133, May 17, 1906, pp. 402–404.
- Simmons, Will. "Painting in Europe with Francis Petrus Paulus", The American Magazine of Art, vol. 17, no. 6, June 1926, pp. 293–295.
- Taaffe, John. "Code for Ascetics", Assumption College Quarterly Review, December 1942, p. 13.
- Werbel, Amy Beth. Thomas Eakins: Art, Medicine, and Sexuality in Nineteenth-Century Philadelphia, New Haven: Yale University Press, 2007.
