= Carmel Art Association =

Non-profit organization and gallery located in Carmel-by-the-Sea, California

Carmel Art Association (CAA)
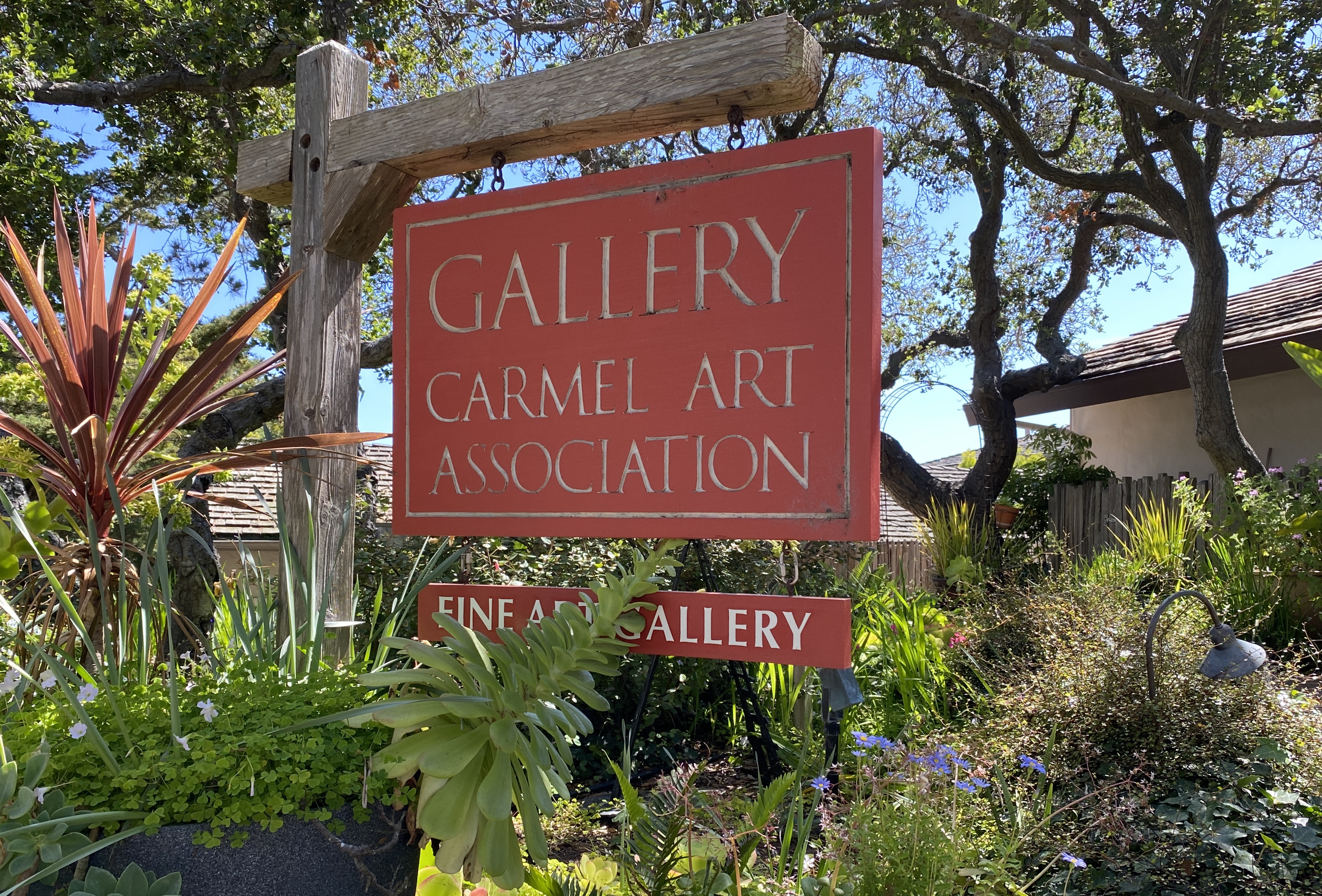
- Established: 1927; 99 years ago
- Location: Dolores Street between 5th & 6th Ave., Carmel-by-the-Sea, California
- Coordinates: 36.556667°N 121.920556°W
- Type: Art Gallery
- Founder: Jennie V. Cannon
- Director: Board of Directors
- Architect: Clay Otto
- Website: carmelart.org

The Carmel Art Association (CAA) is a Not-for-profit arts organization and gallery located in Carmel-by-the-Sea, California. The CAA is Carmel's oldest gallery. It features the work of many local artists living on the Monterey Peninsula. Many of its members were early California artists. The CAA is a 501(c)(3) organization.

== History ==
The CAA was founded on August 8, 1927, by a small group of artists who gathered at “Gray Gables,” the modest home and studio of Josephine M. Culbertson and Ida A. Johnson at the corner of Seventh and Lincoln in Carmel-by-the-Sea, California. The originator of the plan was Jennie V. Cannon of Berkeley, California, who was a frequent visitor to Carmel and owned a summer cottage there. Pedro Joseph de Lemos of Carmel was elected the first president of the CAA in August 1927. A constitution presented by Ada B. Champlin was accepted with some amendments. In late October 1927, the exhibition of 41 artists took place in Seven Arts Building in Carmel. The association filed articles of incorporation on January 26, 1934.

Artist and playwright Ira Mallory Remsen (1876-1928) was active with the Carmel Art Association when it was at the corner of Seventh and Lincoln Street. On July 8, 1929, artists Ray and Dorthy Woodward purchased Rem's studio for $6,000 (equivalent to $112,500 in 2025).

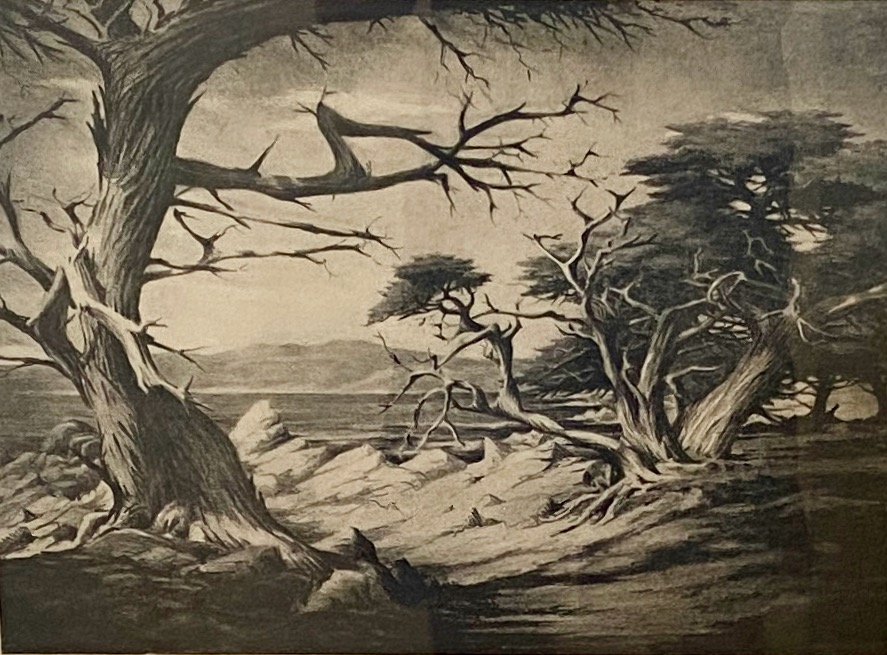
Paul Whitman - Monterey Cypress

== Exhibitions ==
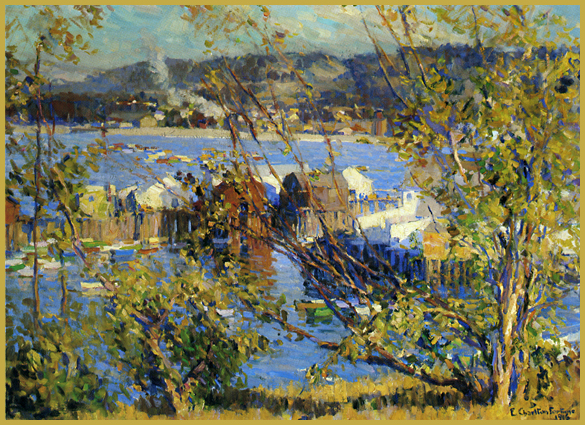
E. Charlton Fortune, Monterey Bay (Oakland Museum of California)

One of the first CAA exhibitions was on June 3, 1928 at the Stanford Art Gallery of oil paintings and watercolors by 25 of its members. One of the paintings was by Percy Gray called "Coast Near Monterey".

Jo Mora was active in the Carmel community and served on the board of directors of the CAA, where his sculptures were exhibited between 1927 and 1934.

Salvador Dalí joined the CAA. On June 8, 1947, he participated as an art expert and juror in a contest sponsored by CAA that awarded high school students from Albany High School in Oakland, California.

On July 28, 1988, the CAA held an exhibition of paintings and graphics by six early members. Francis McComas was one of them.
