= Percy Gray =

American painter (1869–1952)

- Born: Henry Percy Gray; October 3, 1869; San Francisco, California, US
- Died: October 10, 1952 (aged 83); San Francisco, California, US
- Notable work: Out of the Desert, Oregon
- Spouse: Leone Phelps

Percy Gray (October 3, 1869 – October 10, 1952) was an American painter. At the 1915 Panama–Pacific International Exposition he won a bronze medal for his watercolor Out of the Desert, Oregon. Gray's artwork is held in the permanent collections of several museums, including the Crocker Art Museum, and Monterey Museum of Art.

== Early life ==
Gray was born on October 3, 1869, in San Francisco, the third son of Alexander and Elizabeth Gray from England. Alexander Gray brought his family to California in 1867.

As the byproduct of a childhood illness, Percy realized he had talents in art. From 1886 to 1888 he studied at the San Francisco School of Design under Emil Carlsen, Virgil Williams, Thomas Hill, Oscar Kunath, and later under William Merritt Chase in New York. While he had some early Impressionistic tendencies, his basic approach to composition and color was derived from the Barbizon School and Tonalism, which were emphasized at the School of Design. He is primarily known for his romantic and lush depictions of the Northern California landscape.

== Career ==
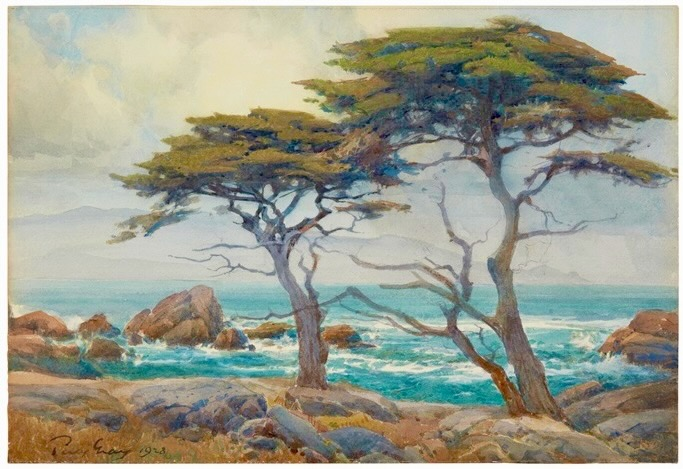
Along the Monterey Coastline (1928), watercolor by Percy Gray

His earliest documented exhibition was at the 1888 Mechanics’ Institute Fair where he displayed View of the Golden Gate. From there he went on to become an assistant to a stockbroker and a quick-sketch illustrator for the San Francisco Morning Call before obtaining a job with the New York Journal. In New York he studied at the Art Students League. He was dispatched from New York to cover the 1906 San Francisco earthquake, but decided to remain in his native city where he would then take up his painting career.

=== A Painter in San Francisco ===
Gray's first pieces, headland seascapes, were exhibited in 1907 at the Sketch Club. Gray “first rose to prominence” through the sketches he made for the Henry K. Thaw murder trial which were sensationally reproduced in all the Hearst newspapers. From 1907 to 1914 his exhibited works at the San Francisco Art Association were primarily scenes of Berkeley and Alameda oaks, marshes, eucalyptus groves, seascapes, and fields of California wildflowers. These subjects would become signatures of his work. Originally Gray's works were oils; however, he eventually developed an allergy to oil paints, and switched to using watercolors as his primary medium. From early on the critics marveled at his ability to infuse realistic depictions of nature with a mystical and poetic quality. He was clearly applying the precepts of his mentor William Merritt Chase in arranging light and color. One critic, evaluating Gray's use of material and watercolor technique, stated that "the watercolors that fall into Gray's somewhat Tonalist period, beginning after his return to the West Coast in 1906, mark a masterful level of achievement with brush and wash," citing his 1909 "Trees on a Hillside," which "has a liquid feel to its execution."

In 1909 he moved his residence from Alameda, California, across the bay to Burlingame, California, which is about twenty miles south of San Francisco, where he maintained a studio. He lived with his widowed mother and siblings. For more than four decades he exhibited at museums and commercial galleries, some of which include the: Schussler Brothers Gallery of San Francisco (1909-1921); Rabjohn & Morcom Galleries of Oakland and San Francisco (1911-1920); Courvoisier Gallery of San Francisco (1911, 1931); Del Monte Art Gallery of Monterey (1907-1912, 1930); California Society of Etchers, San Francisco (1914); de Young Museum of San Francisco (1915-1916, 1925); Palace of Fine Arts in San Francisco (1916); St. Francis Hotel in San Francisco (1918, 1922); Stanford University, Palo Alto (1918, 1921); Print Rooms of San Francisco (1920-1921); Bohemian Club of San Francisco (1920-1949); Gump’s Galleries of San Francisco and Hawaii (1925-1926); Graves Gallery of San Francisco (1938-1939).

At the 1915 Panama–Pacific International Exposition he won a bronze medal for his watercolor Out of the Desert, Oregon. In 1940 he was awarded a prize at the Golden Gate International Exposition. He traveled outside of California, including paintings expeditions to the Pacific Northwest and Arizona.

=== Later years ===
Having been a bachelor for 53 years, Gray surprised his friends by marrying. He and his bride, Leone Phelps, moved to Carmel-by-the-Sea, California, in the spring of 1923 and later that year they purchased the Sherman Rose House on the grounds of the Larkin Adobe in nearby Monterey, California, where seascapes and cypress dominated his later works.

Gray was very active in the Carmel art colony, often staying for several months at a time, and exhibiting with the Carmel Arts and Crafts Club (1913, 1923) and the Carmel Art Association (1927-1928, 1932-1943). In 1939 the Grays sold their adobe and moved to San Francisco. Restless for the out-of-doors, Gray and his wife resettled in San Anselmo, California, at the base of Mount Tamalpais in 1941. He became a founding member of the conservative Society for Sanity in Art (later renamed the Society of Western Artists), where he exhibited from 1939 to 1947 and received several awards. After ten years in Marin County, California, his wife died and he returned to San Francisco.

== Death ==
Gray died on October 10, 1952, from a heart attack in San Francisco.

== Legacy ==
In 1970, the California Historical Society of San Francisco organized a significant retrospective exhibition showcasing Gray's artistic oeuvre. This comprehensive display featured around one hundred and fifty pieces of his work. Thomas Albright, the art critic for the Chronicle, provided an unexpectedly candid evaluation of Gray. Gray's watercolors were featured in California art exhibitions held at the Oakland Art Museum, both in July 1962 and again in July 1970. The Carmel Art Association (CAA) also supported a dedicated solo exhibition showcasing his paintings and graphic artwork in 1998. Impressively, despite the dynamic shifts in artistic preferences within the market, Gray's landscapes have continued to enjoy widespread popularity well into the 21st century.
