= Helen Bell Bruton =

American visual artist (1898–1985)

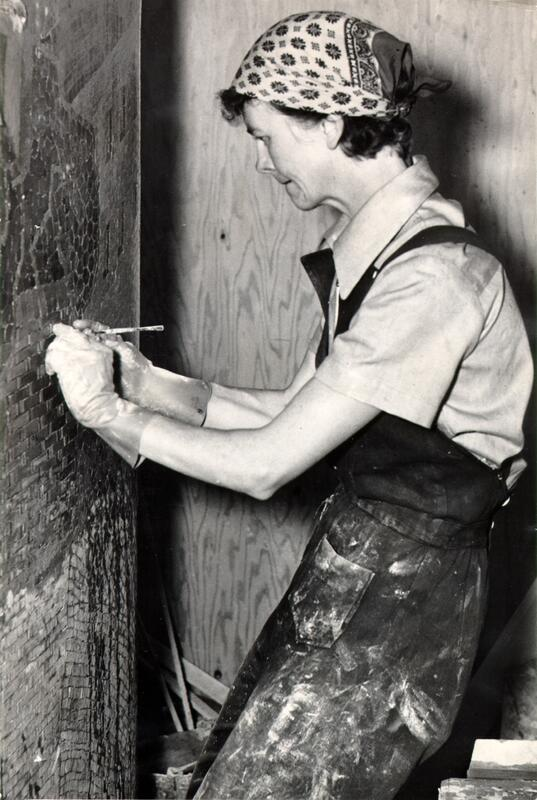
- Born: February 7, 1898; Alameda, California, U.S.
- Died: November 16, 1985 (aged 87); Monterey, California, U.S.
- Education: University of California, Berkeley, Art Students' League
- Occupations: Printmaker, mosaic muralist
- Notable work: Fleishacker Zoo Mother House mosaic, Portrait panels at Mudd Memorial Library

Helen Bell Bruton (February 7, 1898 – November 16, 1985) was an American printmaker, mosaic muralist, sculptor, and painter.

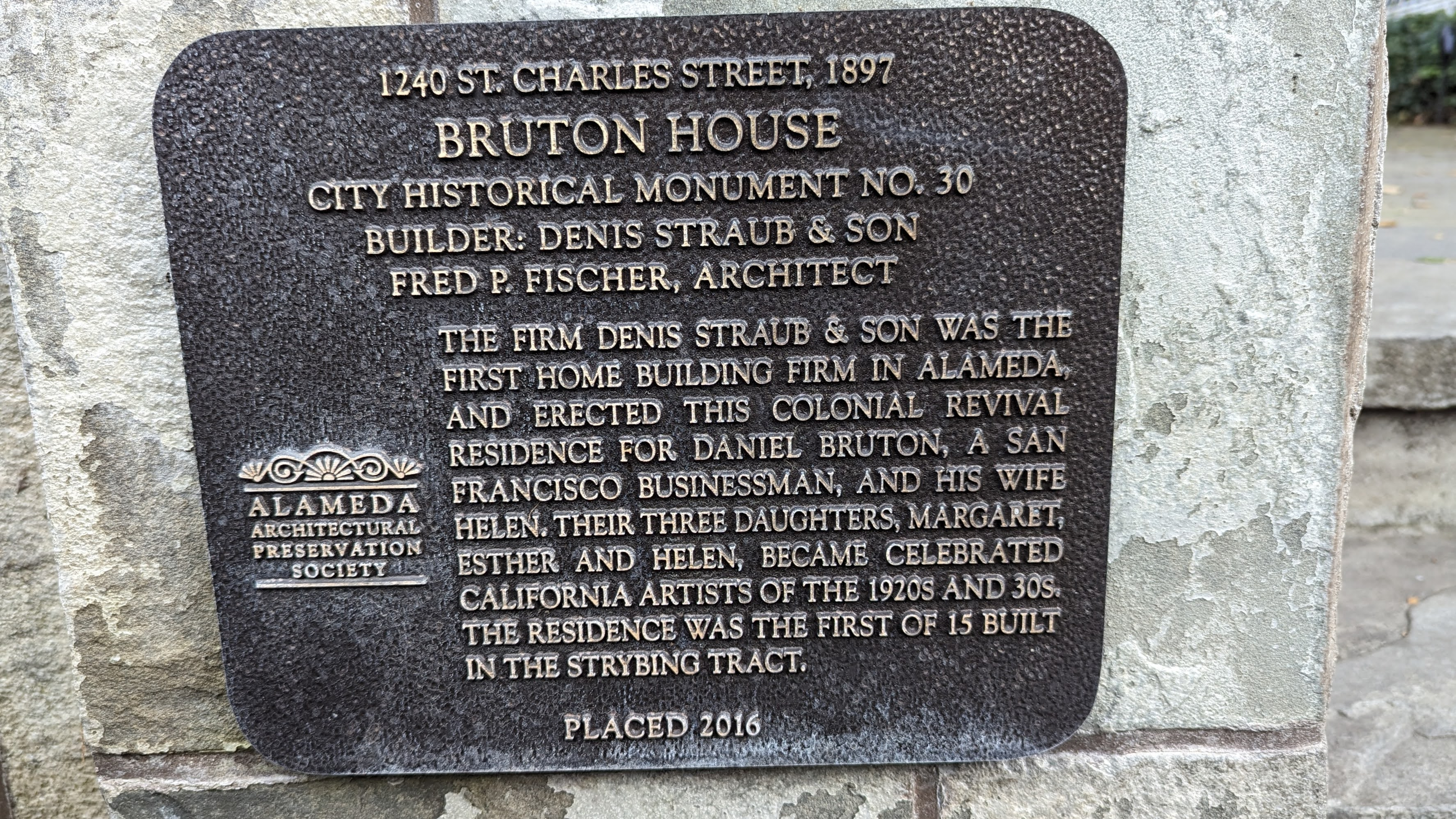
Bruton House 1240 St. Charles Street. Alameda City Historical Building. Plaque

== Biography ==
She was the daughter of Daniel Bruton (1839–1928) and Helen Bell Bruton (1866–1956). Daniel and Helen Bell married in 1893. As a successful tobacco merchant, Daniel commissioned Denis Straub & Son to construct the family home at 1240 St. Charles Street in Alameda. This house was sold by the family in 1944. She had two sisters: Margaret Bruton (1894–1983) and Anne Esther Bruton Gilman (1896–1992).

Helen Bruton began her formal studies at the University of California, Berkeley, but her education was interrupted by World War I. During the war, she and her sisters contributed to the war effort at the Letterman Hospital in San Francisco. In 1920–21, for two years, she continued her artistic education in New York at the Art Students' League, learning under sculptors Alexander Calder, who was teaching there between 1918 and 1922, and Leo Lentelli. Later, she was also studying in New York under Boardman Robinson in his drawing class. In her 1975 interview, however, she did not recall any strong artistic influences in her career. Her and her sisters' source of income was partially based on their San Francisco property rental. Asked about her style she replied "I've always been more interested in people, I never was a very abstract thinker", she considered herself, to some extent, a late Ashcan School artist.

== Early Monterey period (1922–1929) ==
There were two periods when Helen Bruton resided in Monterey, California. The family built and furnished a house in Monterey and stayed in it "on and off" as it was their summer place and "Monterey was small and simple at that time". She recalls:

"[..] we were here in Monterey from about 1922 to 1929, and that’s what I consider the golden age of Monterey from my standpoint because it was so lovely and there was such an interesting group of artists here at the time. It was a very stimulating period. Of course, Armin Hansen had a class and a lot of the younger people gravitated around his class, but there were others. There was Price, and Gay, and the other people who were painting on their own, and I was on the fringe, sculpting, supposedly."

She was associated with the Monterey Group of painters who were meeting at the Stevenson's House. Some of them were associated with the Society of Six.

== Early Great Depression years ==
In about 1929 during the early Great Depression, while her sisters embarked on an artistic expedition to New Mexico (Taos and Santa Fe), Bruton moved to Los Angeles. There, she worked at the Gladding McBean tile company, creating terra cotta portrait panels which are now preserved at the University of Southern California's Mudd Memorial Library. When the stock market crashed in 1929 she was in Los Angeles finishing the "philosophers" job. She recalled:

I remember the dean’s name was Ralph Fluelling. It must have been the philosophy library because it was strictly portraits of philosophers. There were twenty-two panels for the twenty-two philosophers. The job had already been started. I think they had gotten as far as Confucius. I don’t know whether there was anyone earlier than that, but I came in at the Greek period and I had quite a series of Greeks to do, which incidentally I enjoyed very much. And then it came on up through the centuries to Spinoza and some of the English philosophers. Finally, I don’t think it got any farther than Emerson, but it got harder and harder for me; because I don’t know why, but I felt much more at home with the Greeks, and by the time I got to Emerson, I was really bogged down.

Out of the artist's rebellion, she painted clouds on the sky in the form of dogs in Emerson's image because she was prevented, by the dean of the University of Southern California Philosophy Department, to paint dogs close to Emerson himself.

Helen was a lifelong friend of Ina Perham. They traveled to Virginia City in September of 1932 where they worked together. They would wake up at 6.30 in the morning and begin to work at 8 or "a little later".

She and her sisters continued to exhibit at Beaux Arts Galerie in San Francisco where she presented wood blocks art, tiles, and prints. One of the prints displayed was titled "The Party," it was etched on the occasion of a party held at the Stevenson's House in Monterey to bid farewell to someone leaving for Paris to study art.

== Mosaic art (1933–1939) ==
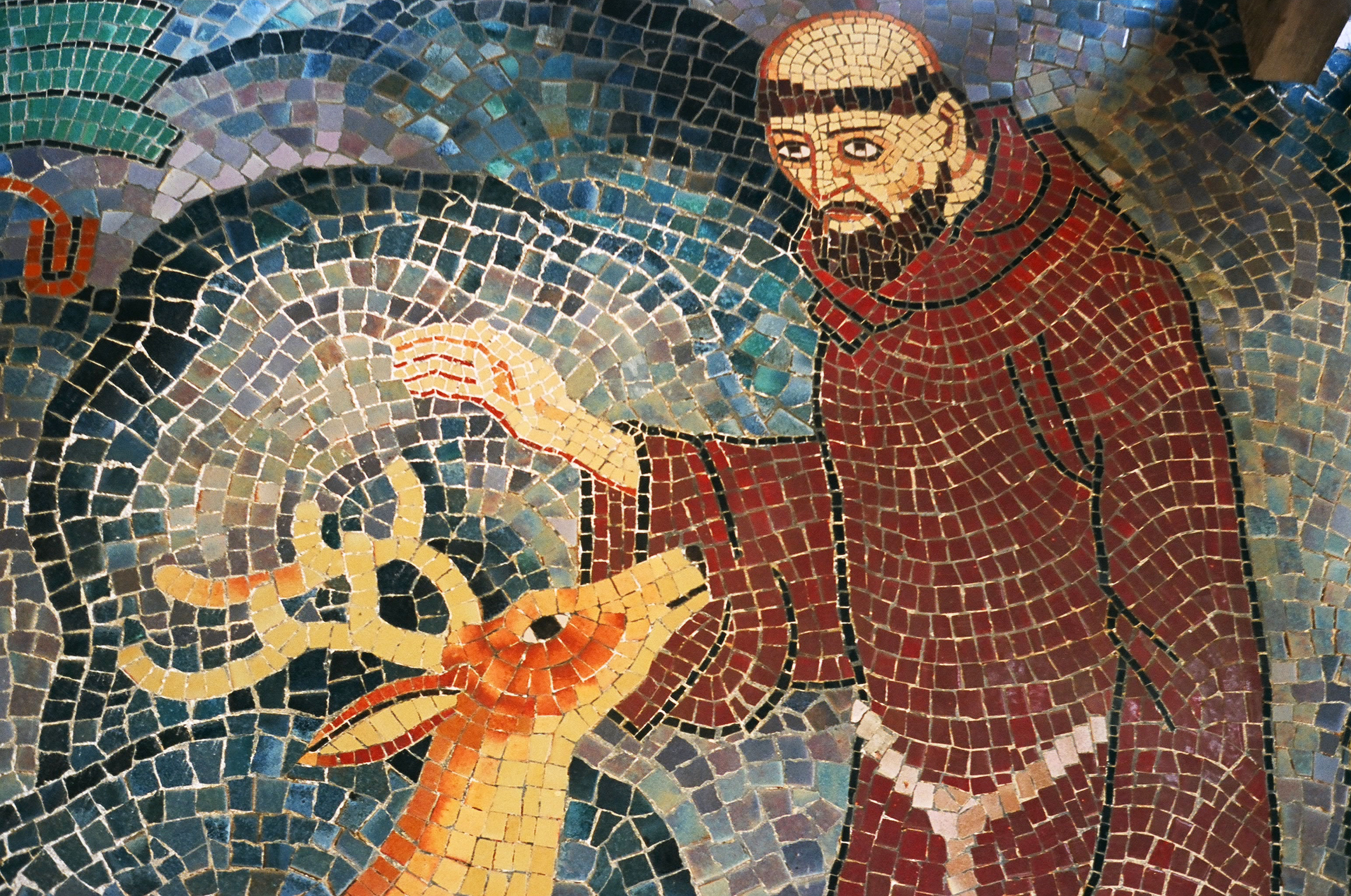
Close up of the Saint Francis mosaic by the Bruton sisters. Mosaic located in Mother's House in San Francisco Zoo

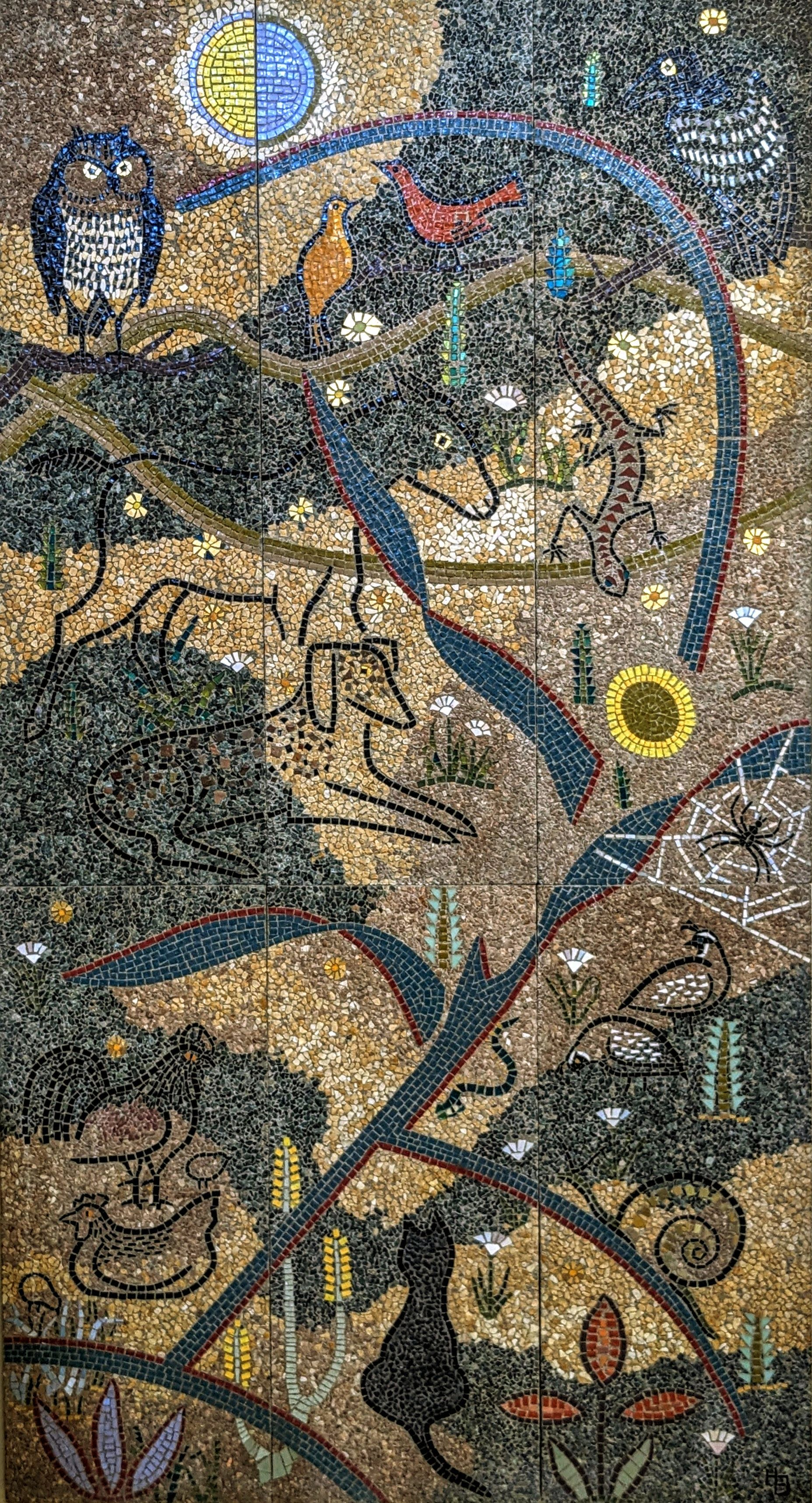
Mosaic by Helen Bell Bruton at the Society for the Prevention of Cruelty to Animals, Monterey County

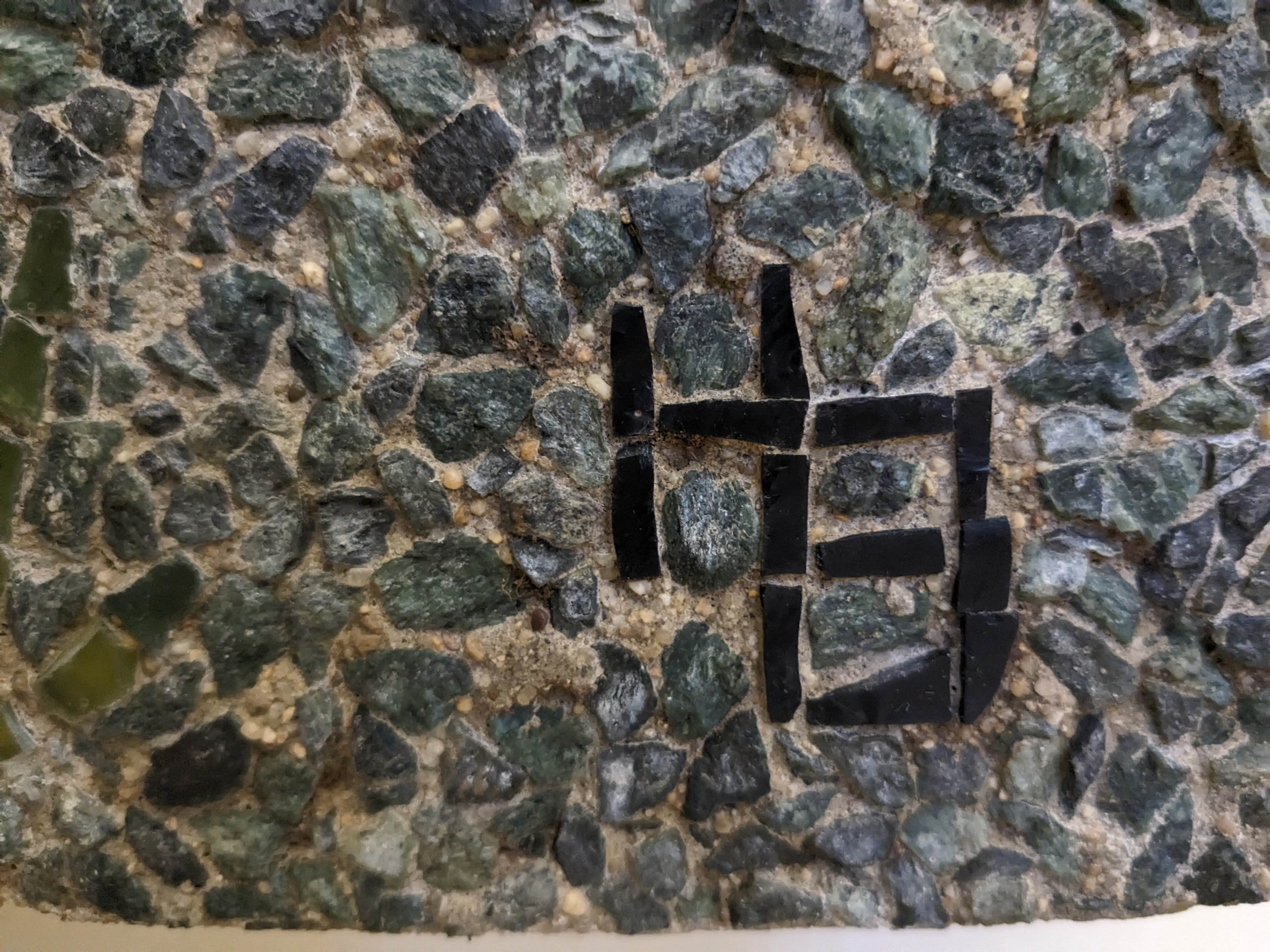
Helen Bruton signature. Mosaic at Society for the Prevention of Cruelty to Animals, Monterey County

In 1930 she ventured into the world of mosaics, working on projects supported by Public Works Administration and Works Progress Administration.

Partnering with her sister Margaret, she designed the exterior mosaic panels for the Fleishacker Zoo Mother House in San Francisco, an undertaking of the Federal Art Project. That project started at the end of 1933 with local materials and with the technical help of Antonio (Anthony) Falcier, an Italian mosaic maker who previously worked on Neptune Pool at Hearst Castle in San Simeon:

"We used for the material some commercial tile that was manufactured at that time in San Jose, California, by a small tile outfit called Solon & Schennell, or the S&S Tile Company. They made a beautiful commercial tile [..] We had names for these tile colors, one was called St. Francis, and St. Francis varied in color all the way from deep Mars violet to a fawn color almost, or a strong ochre color, warm ochre, but it was the same glaze, depending on where it was put in the kiln it would come – that would be the range of shades."

One of the mosaics showcases a boy and a girl alongside a horse, dog, and rabbit, titled Children and Their Animal Friends. The second mosaic, St. Francis, portrays the revered protector of animals and the namesake of San Francisco, encompassed by a deer, wolf, snake, and several birds.

She did mosaics for SS Lurline and SS Mariposa.

In 1935, Egyptian-style mosaics by Helen Bruton were added in the entryway of the Golden West Hotel which is now named Hotel Union Square.

Helen Bruton mosaic Sculpture and Dance, influenced in part by the Byzantine mosaics in Ravenna, was commissioned by the Federal Art Project, spearheaded by Eugen Neuhaus, and installed in 1936 on the wall of the Old Art Gallery of the University of Berkeley. Originally it was built as the central heating and power plant building and converted to a gallery in 1934.

In 1939, she worked on the Treasury Relief Art Project (it was active from 1935 to 1938 and headed by Edward Bruce) for the post office in Fresno, California. This art is now located within the Fresno Unified School District Education Center. Her other projects for the Treasury Relief Art Project were rejected including sketches of Jim Savage and Native Americans for the post office in Merced, California.

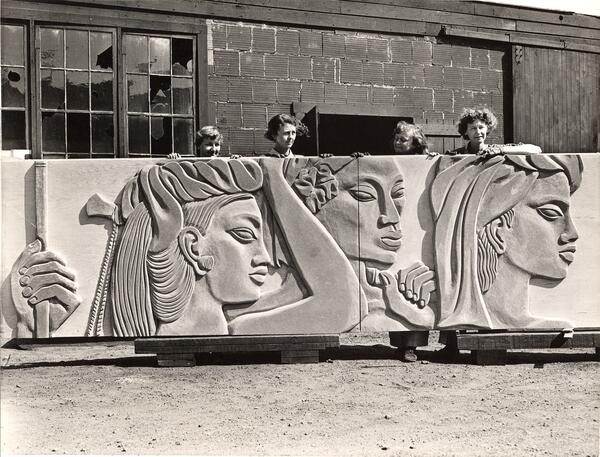
Eleanor Pickersgill, assistant, and artists Margaret, Helen and Esther Bruton, are shown with sections of the mural "The Peacemakers" that decorated the West walls of the Court of Pacifica, Golden Gate International Exposition on Treasure Island

Together with her sisters she created The Peacemakers, a historic mural for the 1939 Golden Gate International Exposition. Housed within Timothy Pflueger's Court of Pacifica, the mural was a dramatic work spanning 144 feet wide by 57 feet tall, representing the collaborative peace between the countries of the East and West. The mural combined elements from Eastern and Western cultures, symbolizing peace across the Pacific. At its center stood two large figures, a Buddha and a kneeling woman, flanked by friezes of 24-foot tall figures and famous architectural landmarks. The Bruton sisters utilized a unique technique, carving the design into masonite panels to create a bas relief effect, allowing for depth and shadow play when illuminated.

== Latter years ==
In 1940, Art in Action was highlighted at the Golden Gate International Exposition (GGIE), offering attendees an intimate look at artists practicing in diverse fields such as painting, sculpture, printmaking, ceramics, metalwork, and woodcarving. Art in Action was featured prominently within the Palace of Fine and Decorative Arts for that year's exposition. Helen Bruton, was in charge of supervising Art in Action throughout the event while Beatrice Judd Ryan, being the State Director of Exhibitions, was one of the organizers. During that program Diego Rivera created Pan American Unity mural.

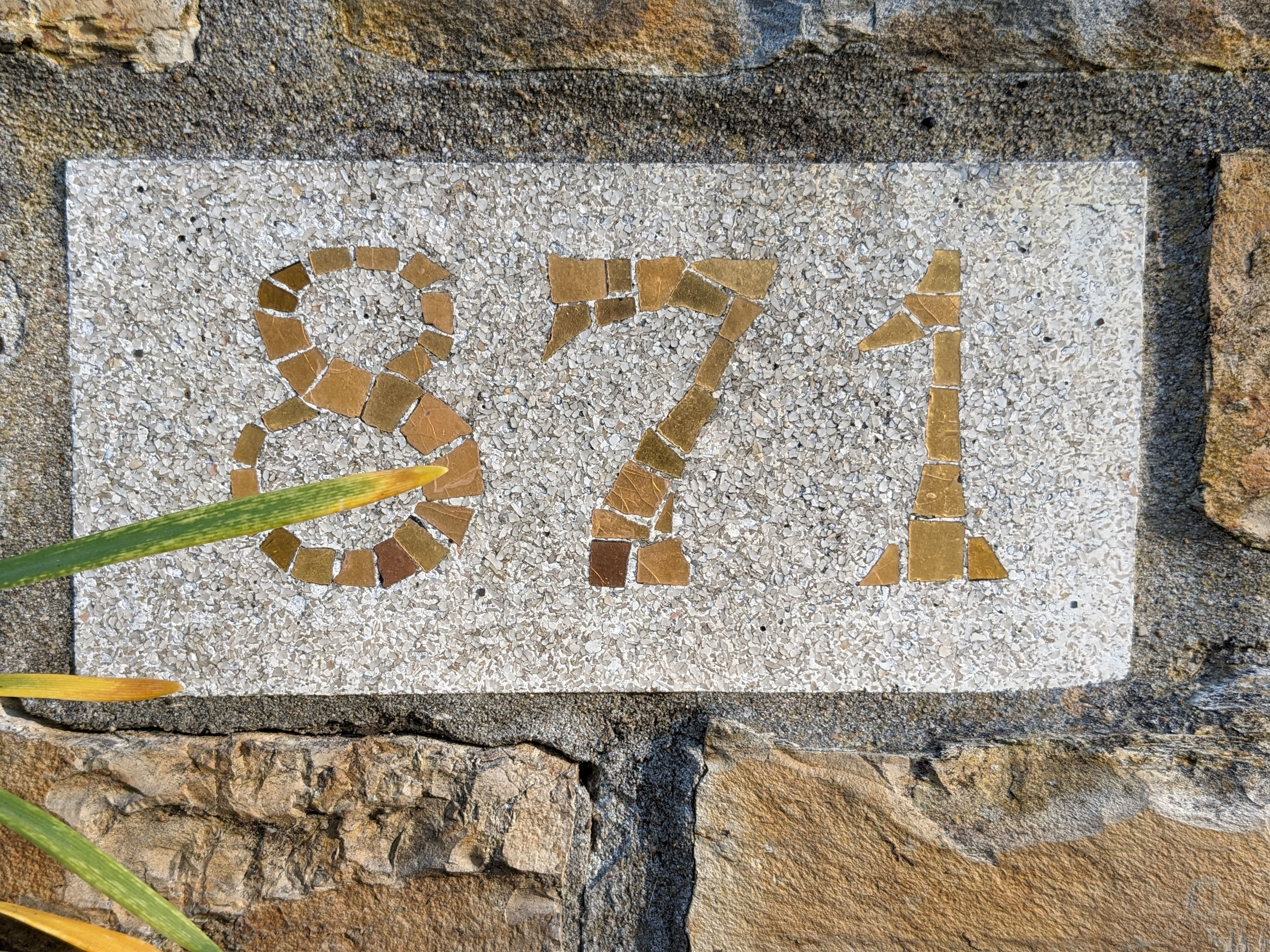
Marker 871 on Cass Street, Monterey

In a 1977 interview, Margaret and Helen revealed that they have been living on Cass Street near downtown Monterey "in the attractive adobe home".

In the end of 1950s Bruton sisters worked for 3 years on approx. 22 mosaics and terrazzo maps for the memorial at the Manila American Cemetery. The Margaret Bruton Collection, housed in the Mayo Hayes O'Donnell Library Doud House Archive Storage in Monterey, contains photo prints of 27 drafts of these maps. The memorial opened in 1960.

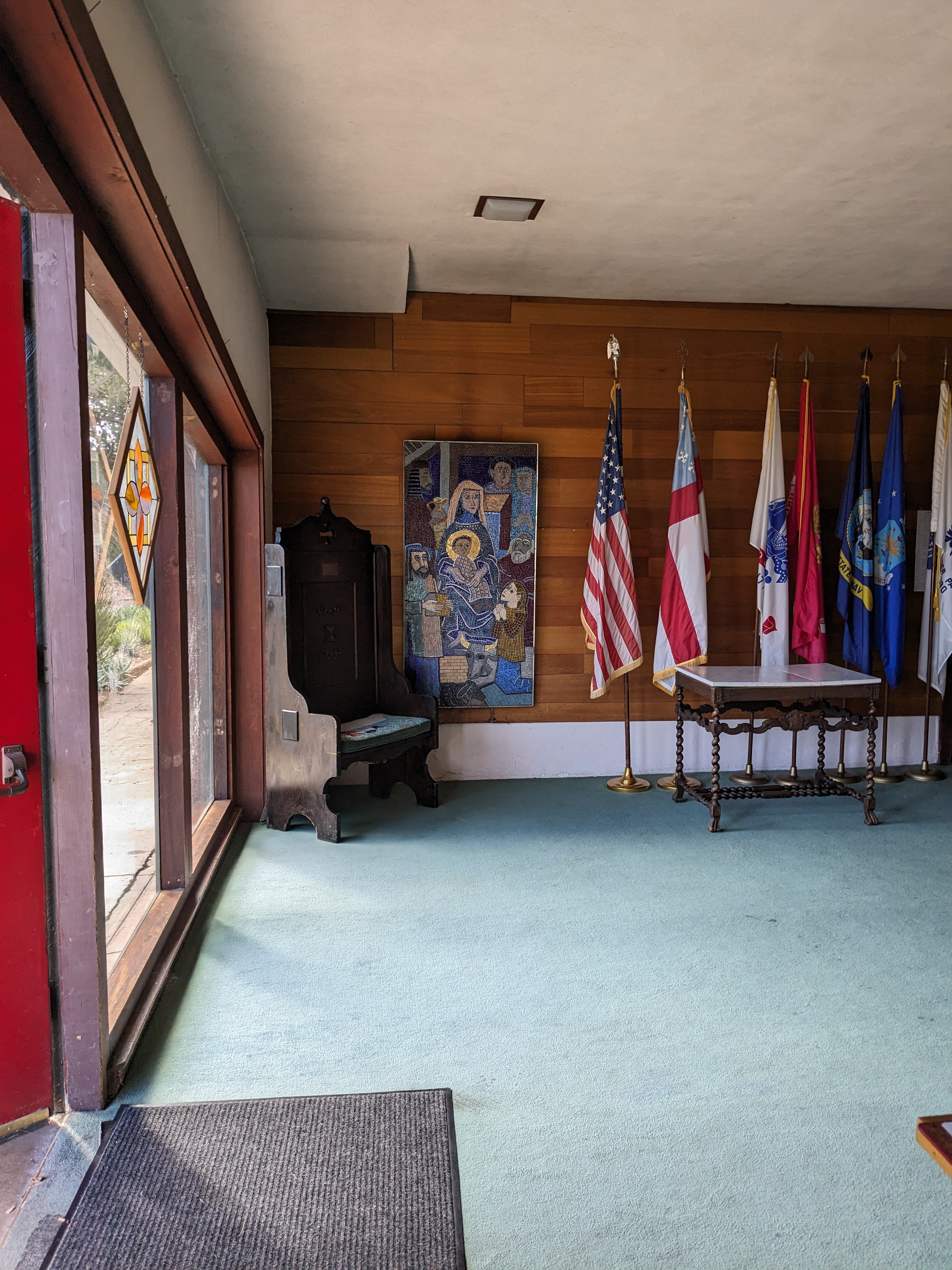
Nativity. Helen Bruton mosaic at Saint James Episcopal Church in Monterey

Nativity mosaic located at Saint James Episcopal Church in Monterey was created around 1952 and was displayed in October–November, 1952 in the de Young Museum's during the "Contemporary Religious Art by California Artists" exhibition.

Bruton was a supporter of Society for the Prevention of Cruelty to Animals (SPCA) Monterey County where she created a large mosaic of wild and domestic animals around 1967. This mosaic is currently in the administrative building.

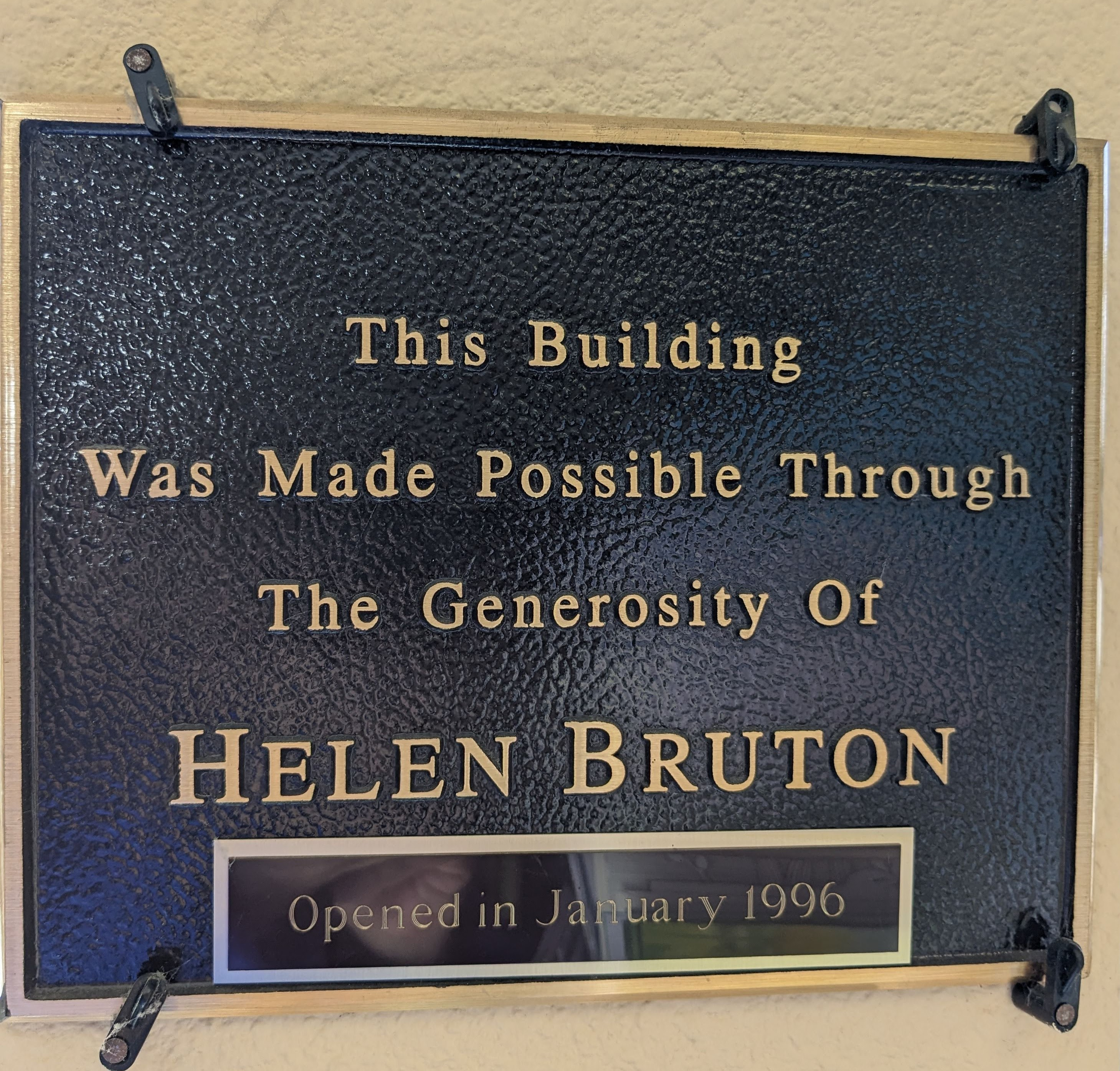
Plaque at the Monterey Peninsula Volunteer Services Benefit Shop on Broadway Ave in Seaside

Bruton was passionate about various other charitable initiatives. She was a significant benefactor to the Monterey Peninsula Volunteer Services which operates their store in Seaside, California.

Bruton was also an active member of the California Society of Etchers.

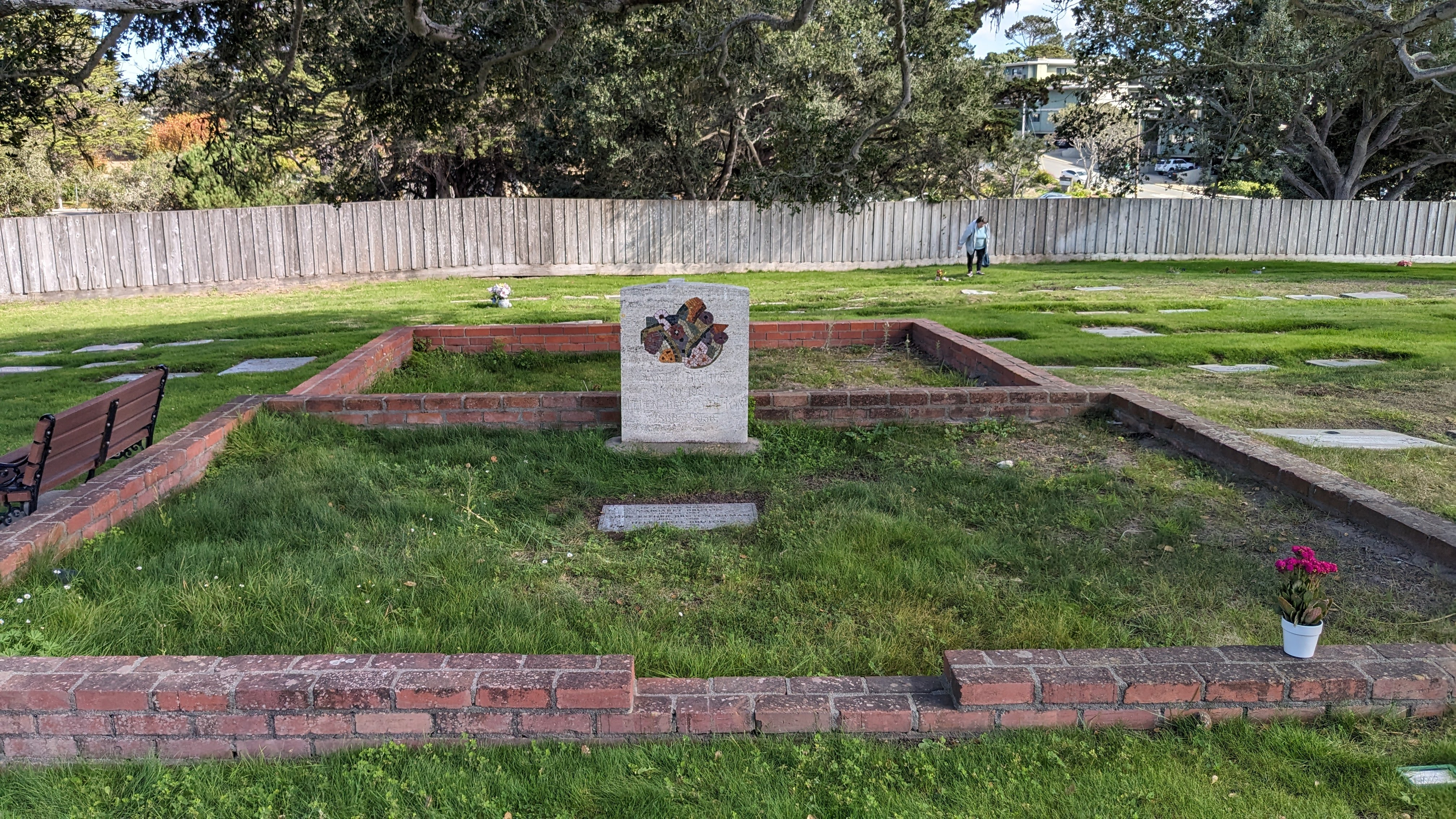
Headstone of Daniel (1839-1928) and Helen (1866-1956), parents of Bruton's sisters; Cemetery El Encinal, Monterey, California
