= Esther Bruton =

American artist

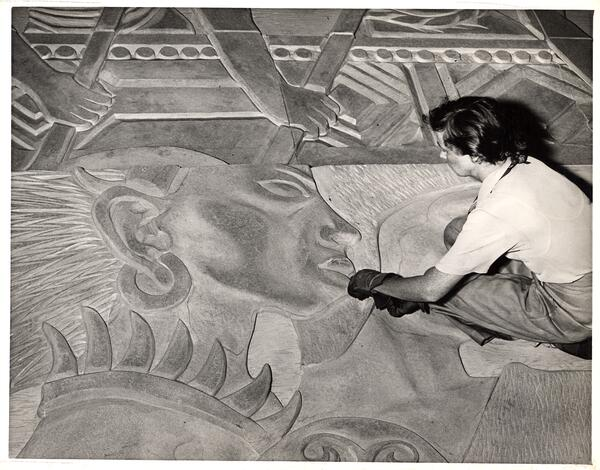
- Bruton with a section of "The Peacemakers", a bas relief mural during the Golden Gate International Exposition
- Born: Anne Esther Bruton; October 17, 1896; Alameda, California, U.S.
- Died: August 31, 1992 (aged 95); Monterey, California, U.S.
- Education: Art Students League of New York, New York School of Fine and Applied Arts
- Known for: Painting, Printmaking, Mosaic, Ceramics, Commercial Art

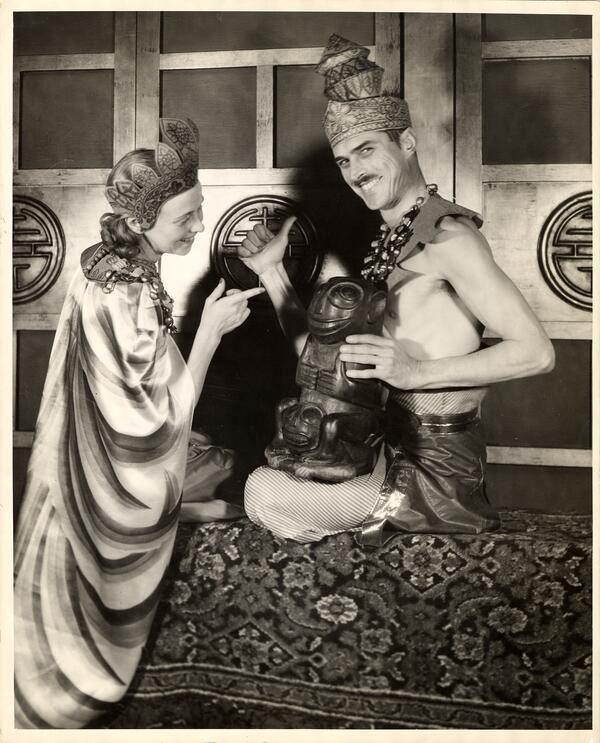
Esther Bruton as a queen of Cambodian Parilia pageant with Victor Arnautoff, 1936

Anne Esther Bruton (October 17, 1896 – August 31, 1992), known professionally as Esther Bruton, was an American artist whose activities included painting, printmaking, mosaics, ceramics, and commercial art.

== Early life and education ==
Born in Alameda, California, Esther was the middle child in an artistic family, with sisters Margaret Bruton and Helen Bell Bruton. After high school in Alameda, she moved to New York City to study at the Art Students League of New York, under the tutelage of George Bridgeman from 1917 to 1918. She also studied commercial art at the New York School of Fine and Applied Arts, now known as Parsons The New School for Design.

== Career ==
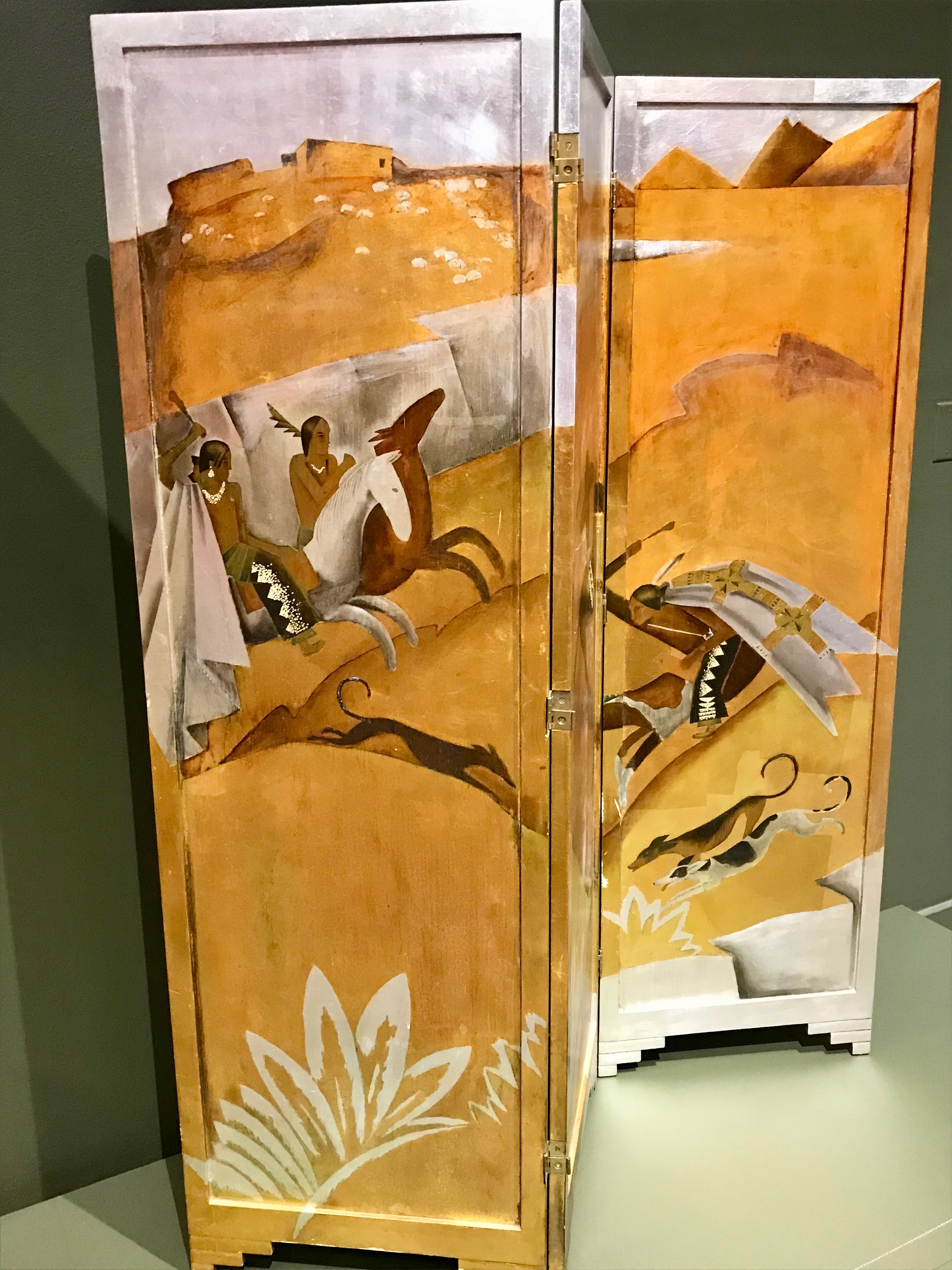
The Rabbit Hunt wood screen by Esther Bruton, 1929.

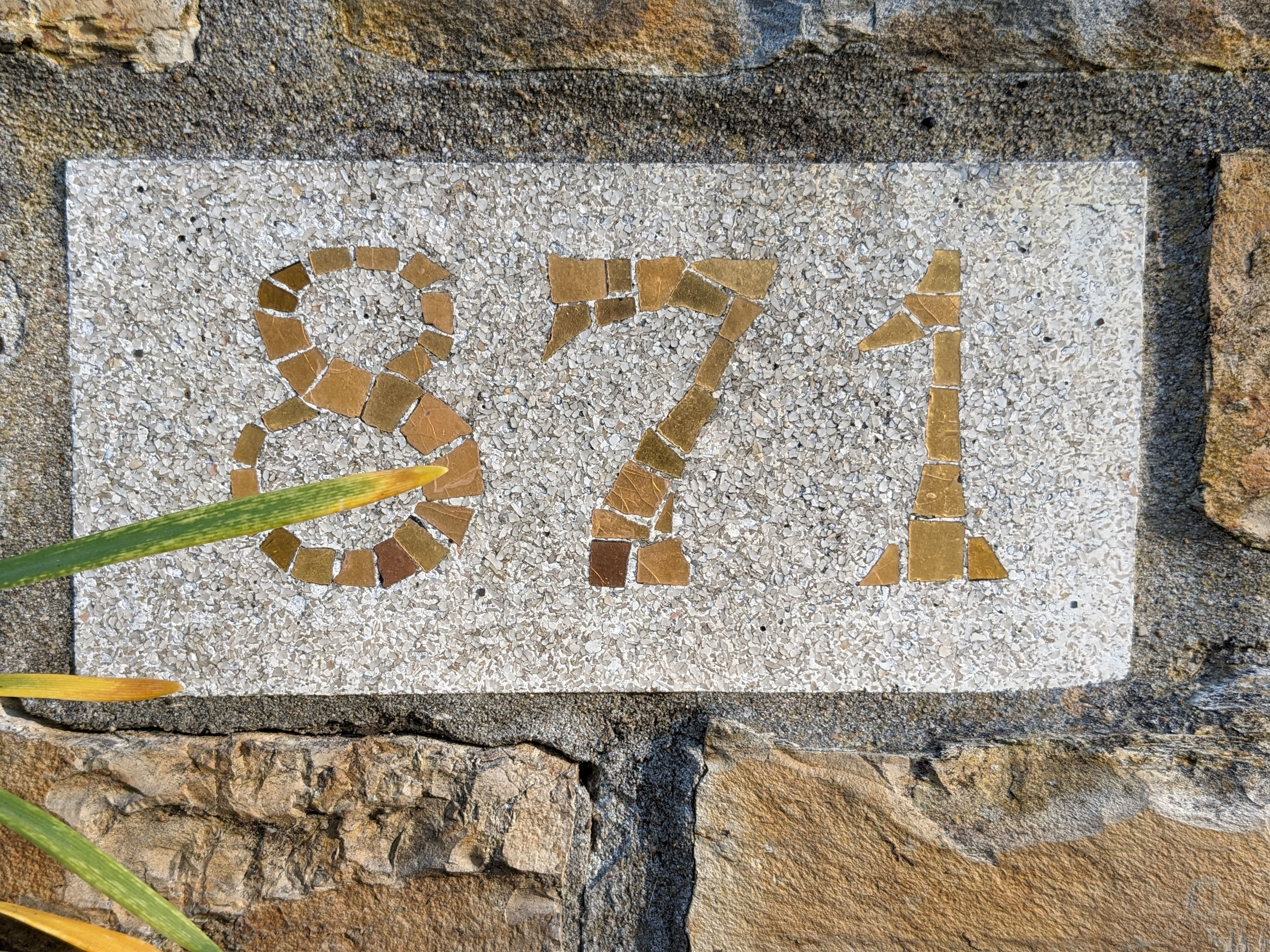
Marker 871 on Cass Street, Monterey

Esther began her career as an advertising illustrator for Lord & Taylor department store, where she worked until 1921. She later worked for the San Francisco I. Magnin department store as a fashion illustrator upon her return to Alameda in 1921. Her travels took her to Tahiti in 1924 and Europe in 1925, studying at the Académie de la Grande Chaumière in Paris with her sister Margaret Bruton. In 1929, she left commercial art to focus on painting and joined her mother and sister Margaret in Taos, New Mexico, where she created significant works inspired by the local culture.

There were two periods when Esther Bruton resided in Monterey, California. The family built and furnished a house in Monterey and stayed in it "on and off" as it was their summer place and "Monterey was small and simple at that time". Helen recalls:

"[..] we were here in Monterey from about 1922 to 1929, and that's what I consider the golden age of Monterey from my standpoint because it was so lovely and there was such an interesting group of artists here at the time. It was a very stimulating period. Of course, Armin Hansen had a class and a lot of the younger people gravitated around his class, but there were others. There was Price, and Gay, and the other people who were painting on their own, and I was on the fringe, sculpting, supposedly."

In 1929 her etching "Gentlemen of the Jury" was part of an exhibition in the Beaux Art Galerie.

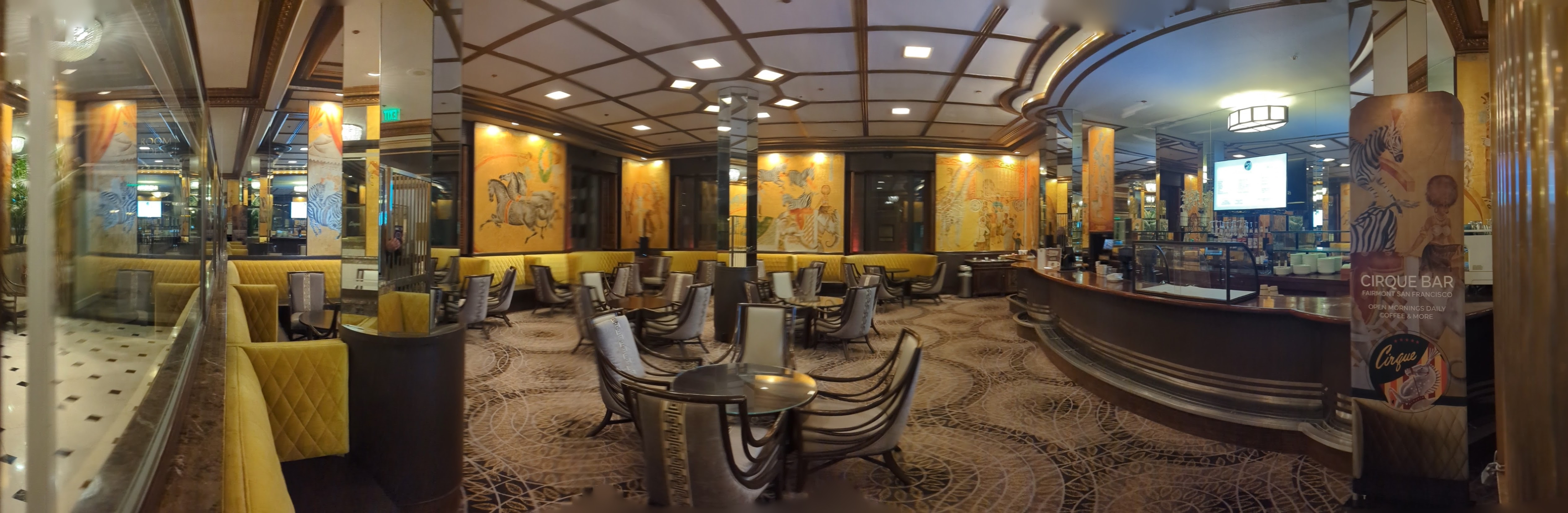
Cirque Room Esther Bruton Panorama

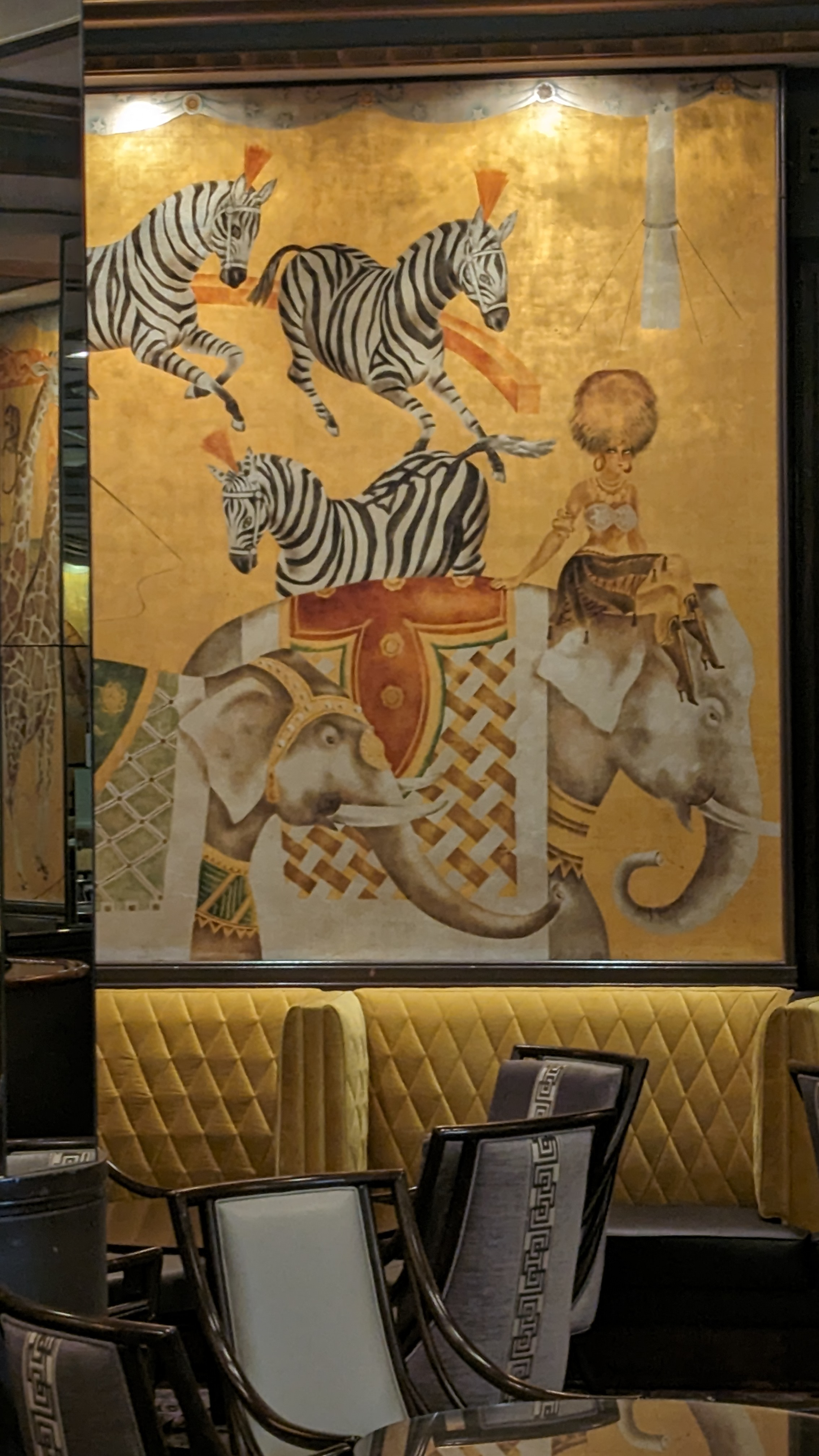
The Cirque Room at the Fairmont Hotel in San Francisco

When Timothy L. Pflueger designed cocktail lounges in several hotels, following the end of Prohibition, she painted murals for the Fairmount Hotel's Cirque Room in San Francisco in 1935. She was associated with the Monterey Group of painters who were meeting at the Stevenson's House. Some of them were associated with the Society of Six.

Throughout the 1930s, Esther exhibited her work widely in California and served as the chairman of the jury for the fifty-seventh Annual Exhibition of the San Francisco Art Association at the San Francisco Museum of Art. She was an active member of the California Society of Etchers and continued her involvement with the San Francisco Art Association.

Esther was a lifelong friend of Ina Perham. They traveled to Virginia City in September 1932, where they worked together. They would wake up at 6:30 a.m. and begin to work at 8 a.m. or "a little later". There is a movie fragment of the Bruton sisters riding horses with Ina.

In 1936, she was selected as a queen of the Parilia pageant with Victor Arnautoff as a king.

Together with her sisters, she created The Peacemakers, a historic mural for the 1939 Golden Gate International Exposition. Housed within Timothy Pflueger's Court of Pacifica, the mural was a dramatic work spanning 144 feet wide by 57 feet tall, representing the collaborative peace between the countries of the East and West. The mural combined elements from Eastern and Western cultures, symbolizing peace across the Pacific. At its center stood two large figures, a Buddha and a kneeling woman, flanked by friezes of 24-foot-tall figures and famous architectural landmarks. The Bruton sisters utilized a unique technique, carving the design into masonite panels to create a bas-relief effect, allowing for depth and shadow play when illuminated.

Esther's renderings for the Dole Pineapple Company captured the essence of Hawaiian landscapes in an advertising booklet with such success that selections were featured in national magazine advertisements in Ladies Home Journal and Pictorial Review in late 1936. Although not personally acquainted with Hawaii, Esther infused her work with the tropical ambiance gleaned from her visit to Tahiti. In addition to her work for Dole, Esther contributed to the California-Hawaiian Sugar Company's marketing efforts. She illustrated a booklet entitled "Behind Your Sugar Bowl" and was responsible for the design of murals in the company's San Francisco office in the Matson Building.

In 1963, she, along with her sisters, created one of the images of Buddha in the Buddha's Universal Church in Chinatown. Esther portrayed Buddha at the approximate age of 20, with his right hand upturned, symbolizing welcome and guidance.

She was married in 1941 to Carl Hooper Gilman.

== Death ==
Esther Bruton died in Monterey, California, at the age of 95 on August 31, 1992.
