= Ina Perham =

American painter and interior decorator

Ina Perham Story
- Born: December 16, 1888; San Francisco, California, U.S.
- Died: July 31, 1979 (aged 90)
- Education: California School of Arts and Crafts
- Occupations: Painter, interior decorator

Ina Perham Story (December 16, 1888 – July 31, 1979) was an American painter and interior decorator. Perham was known for her contributions to the Californian art scene with her still life, landscape, and portrait works. In the 1920s she was a member of the Monterey Group of artists..

== Early life ==
Ina Perham was born in San Francisco, California, the daughter of George Lawrence Perham and Jennie Marie Perham (Clifford). Perham's grandfather Hiram Clifford arrived in California during the Gold Rush era, made a fortune, and founded a dairy in San Francisco known as the Boston Ranch.. Her mother was the president of Dairy Delivery, she died in 1920 in San Francisco.

In 1903 she participated in the musical recital given at the home of Arthur William Foster at San Rafael and in 1904 Ina Perham participated in another musical recital of pupils of prominent teacher of voice Esther A. Mundell, a student of Polish tenor Jean de Reszke.

Early on she was acquainted with Monterey Bay area. In 1907 it was reported that a motor car party of San Franciscans reached Del Monte Hotel in Monterey on the 15th including G. L. Perham and Miss Ina Perham.

Ina graduated from San Mateo High School and later taught there for two years. She attended the California School of Arts and Crafts in Berkeley where she was elected a president of the student body of the school in October 1910 and participated in festivities during the annual exhibition of handicrafts and artwork presented by the students. The article displayed her picture with the caption "Ina Perham who leads her pupils to Arden Forest".

== WWI Period ==
During World War I, Ina Perham was actively involved with the San Mateo County Women's Committee of the National and State Defense. Additionally, she was a member of the San Mateo and Burlingame Red Cross units. In 1919, she worked in craft personnel at the Letterman General Hospital alongside Margaret Bruton and other women.

Perham was romantically involved with Earl Warren during a period when his military commitments largely kept him on base, but he maintained a correspondence with her. Their acquaintance began in Berkeley around 1918-1919. According to Warren's biographer, Perham was an "intelligent and bold artist," whose vivacity starkly contrasted with Warren's more reserved nature.

== Monterey Group ==
In the early 1920s, Ina Perham Story moved to Monterey, where she became a pupil of Armin Hansen and shared a studio in the Robert Louis Stevenson House with C. S. Price. She was romantically involved with him, as suggested by Helen Bruton's etching The Party.

In 1925, the Christian Science Monitor mentioned her as part of the Monterey Group of young painters known for their vigor. That same year, the group exhibited their work at the Hagemeyer studio in Carmel, including members like Armin Hansen, Albert Barrows, C. S. Price, V. Howard, August Gay, M. Oliver, Margaret Bruton, H. M. Douglas, and Helen Bruton. Perham also studied in Europe with François Quelvée (1884-1967) and at the Académie de la Grande Chaumière.

Upon her return in 1926, the Club Beaux Arts in San Francisco presented Quelvée's paintings, watercolors, and brush drawings, which were brought from Europe by Perham.

In the summer of 1927, she exhibited two crayon drawings in San Francisco, and in May 1927, as part of the Monterey Group and a member of Club Beaux Art, she exhibited alongside Lucy Pierce, R. V. Howard, C. S. Price, and Margaret Bruton. In December 1927, the Oakland Tribune published her drawing titled Carmel Mission, noting her work for its rich black tones and featured in the Beaux Arts holiday exhibition.

In the summer and fall of 1928, Perham visited Taos, New Mexico, focusing on landscape paintings. Her first solo show in 1928, hosted by Beatrice Judd Ryan of the Beaux Art Gallery, was well-received by critics for her depictions of New Mexico landscapes and cityscapes.

Edward Weston, a fellow Carmel resident, wrote in his memoir on December 18, 1928, praising Perham's painting abilities:

We had a jolly time, laughed our heads off and all voted for the same picture at the Beaux Arts contest because the nicest girl had painted it. One might have chosen a worse way to vote! The paintings were mostly bad enough, and I must say our judgment was not so dulled by gin that we were far off aesthetically. Ina Perham paints well.

Perham was featured in Helen Bruton's painting Beach Picnic (circa 1932), which depicted a circle of eight friends, including Helen Bell Bruton, Margaret Bruton, Esther Bruton, Ina Perham (in a red dress), C. S. Price, Robert Viven Howard, August Gay, and Flora McDonalds (Johnstone), along with two dogs, Flagg and Mickey. The painting, which included a nude and a semi-nude woman, was unfortunately lost in the 1991 Oakland firestorm.

In 1929, her works were noted as "other drawings of power", and it was reported that despite spending most of the year in Monterey, she was also a part of the summer artistic colony in Berkeley.

== New York City ==
In 1929, Ina Perham married Frederic E. Story (1883–1962) and moved with him to New York.

She studied under Hans Hofmann, who relocated to Berkeley in 1930. In 1930, she exhibited at the Galerie Beaux-Arts, where her large watercolor depicting a pool in the woods was described as "a capital piece of work".

Perham maintained lifelong friendships with Helen Bell Bruton, Margaret Bruton, and Esther Bruton. In September 1932, she visited the Bruton sisters in Virginia City and collaborated with them. During the 54th annual exhibition of the San Francisco Art Association in 1932, she received the first award in watercolor paintings for her work Calla Lilies, recognized as a study in a modern mood.

In 1955, Perham wrote an article in the Christian Science Sentinel titled The Spiritual Nature of Art, where she discussed the teachings of Mary Baker Eddy and expressed that art should reflect God's creation, emphasizing elements like rhythm, balance, and beauty.

In 1934, she exhibited watercolors at Delphic Studios on East 57th Street in New York. She also won a $25 prize at the Society of Women Artists annual public exhibit at the San Francisco Museum of Art for her watercolor White Barn, featuring two horses and a man. It was noted that women artists, particularly in watercolors, were embracing modernity.

By 1936, Perham was living in Mamaroneck, New York.

In May 1938, she showcased her pastels of scenes from New York, Bermuda, and Mexico at the Lord & Taylor store. In 1939, she participated in the Golden Gate International Exposition and exhibited her tempera painting The Circus at the 1939 New York World's Fair. In April 1947, her work was displayed at the Art in Action Shop, City of Paris store, alongside artists like Midori Hanamura, George Harris, David Park, and Florence Swift.

== Return ==
After the death of her husband, Frederic Edward Story, on April 29, 1962, Ina Perham Story returned to California. In 1977, she held a solo exhibition in Ojai. She died on July 31, 1979. Her artistic portfolio was diverse, encompassing landscapes, still lifes, portraits, and figure studies. Her career was notably enhanced by her travels and studies abroad, including time spent in Tahiti, Europe, and various parts of the United States, which greatly enriched her experience and artistic work.

== Other ==
Lucy Valentine Pierce (1887–1974) created a painting titled Portrait of Ina Story, which depicts Ina Perham Story. Additionally, the documentary film Ina's Circle released in 2020 offers an in-depth look into the life and career of Ina Perham Story.
