= Margaret Bruton =

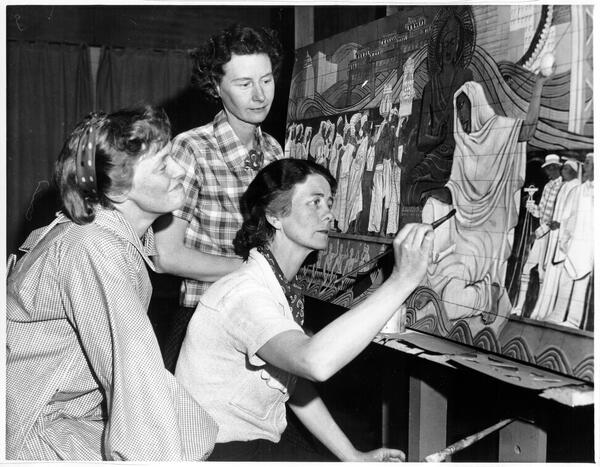
- Seated in the foreground is Esther Bruton; Helen Bruton is wielding the brush; while Margaret Bruton stands.
- Born: Margaret Bell Bruton; February 20, 1894; Brooklyn, New York, U.S.
- Died: August 29, 1983 (aged 89); Monterey, California, U.S.
- Education: Mark Hopkins Institute of Art, Art Students' League, Académie de la Grande Chaumière
- Known for: Painting, murals, printmaking

Margaret Bell Bruton (February 20, 1894 – August 29, 1983) was an American painter, muralist, and printmaker known for her contributions to the Californian art scene.

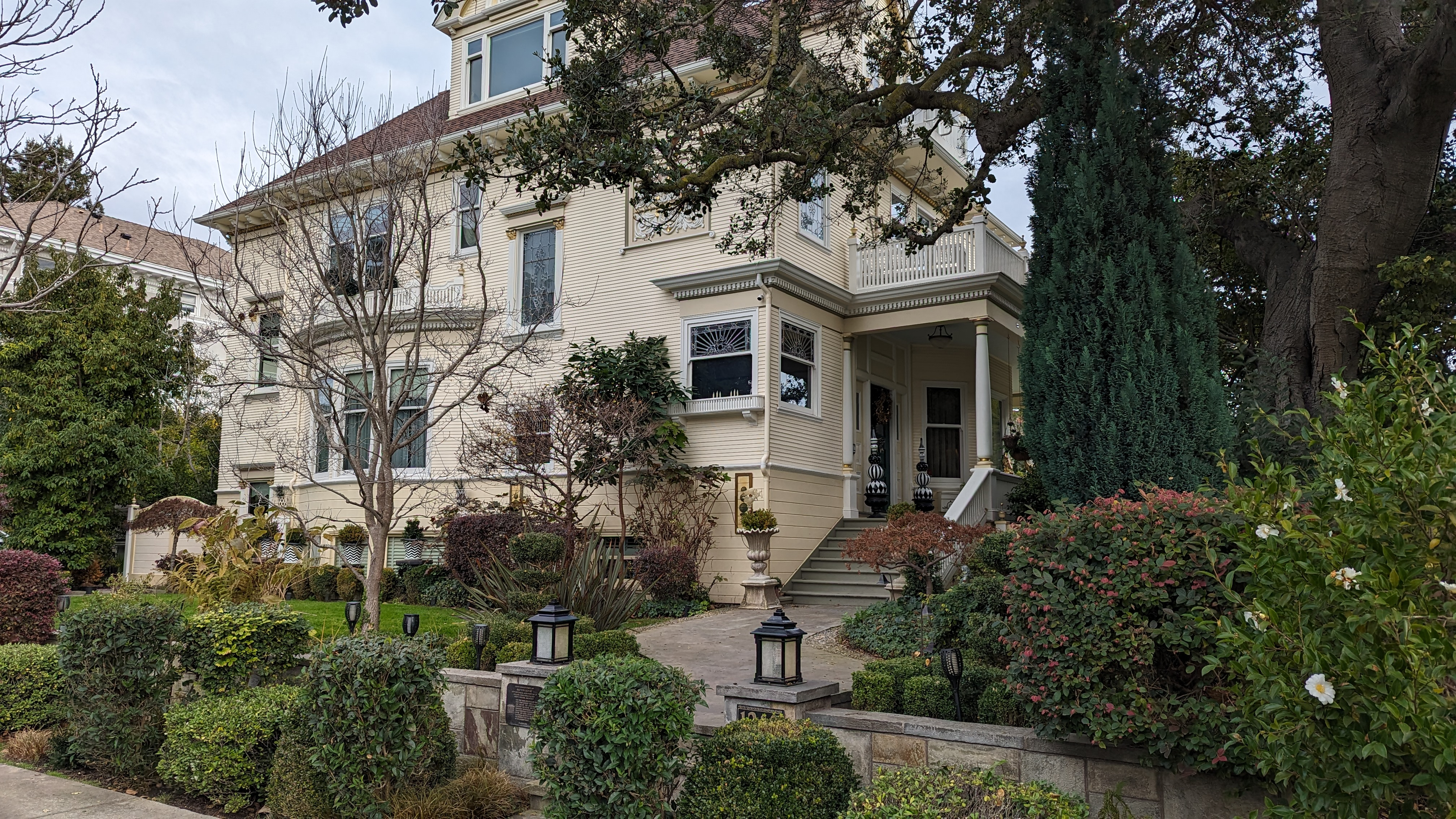
Bruton House 1240 St. Charles Street. Alameda City Historical Building (in January 2024)

== Early life ==
Margaret Bruton was born to Daniel Bruton (1839–1928) of Dublin, Ireland, and Helen Bell (1866–1956) of Belfast, Ireland. Daniel, an employee at the American Tobacco Company, eventually moved the family to San Francisco, California. Margaret was the eldest of three sisters, including Anne Esther Bruton Gilman (1896–1992) and Helen Bruton (1898–1985). She grew up attending public schools in Alameda, California.

== Education and early career ==
Bruton attended the Mark Hopkins Institute of Art where she studied under Frank Van Sloun. In 1913 she won a scholarship in the 10th annual scholarship competition organized by the Art Students League of New York. There, she worked under the guidance of artists Robert Henri and Frank Vincent Dumond from 1914 to 1918.

== Early Monterey period (1922–1929) ==
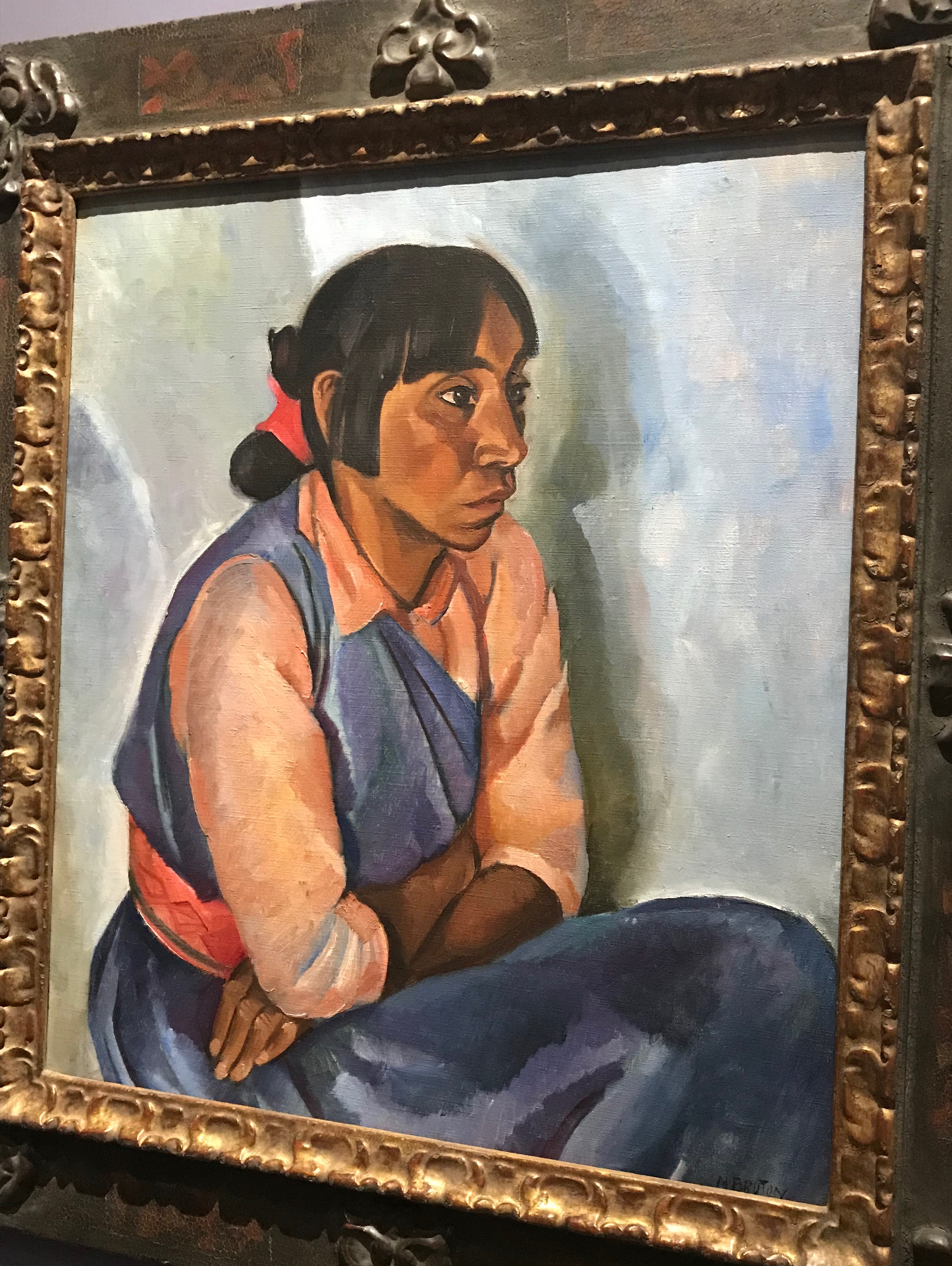
Taos Woman circa 1928 by Margaret Bruton.

In the early 1920s, Bruton moved to Monterey, California, to study with artist Armin Hansen. The Bruton family eventually settled there, building a house and studio; it was their summer place.

Bruton was associated with a Monterey group of painters who met at the Stevenson's House. Some were associated with the Society of Six.

Bruton had various exhibitions, such as a group exhibition at the Los Angeles Museum in 1923 where she won a $100 prize. She also received accolades at the Santa Cruz Art League in 1925.

Margaret and her sisters were lifelong friends of Ina Perham. They traveled to Virginia City in September of 1932 where they worked together.

== Mosaic and terrazzo art ==
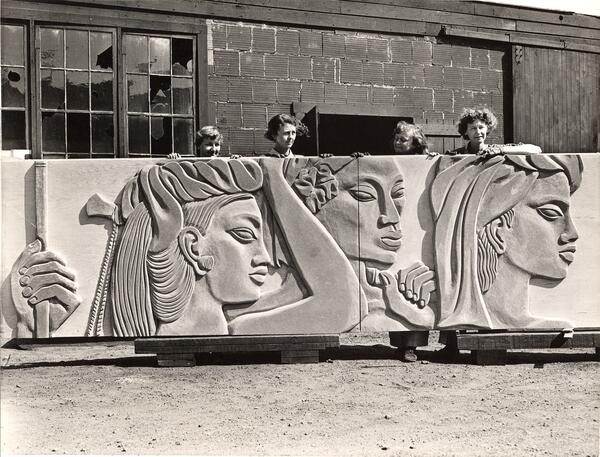
Eleanor Pickersgill, assistant, and artists Margaret, Helen and Esther Bruton, are shown with sections of the mural "Peacemakers" that decorated the West walls of the Court of Pacifica, Golden Gate International Exposition on Treasure Island

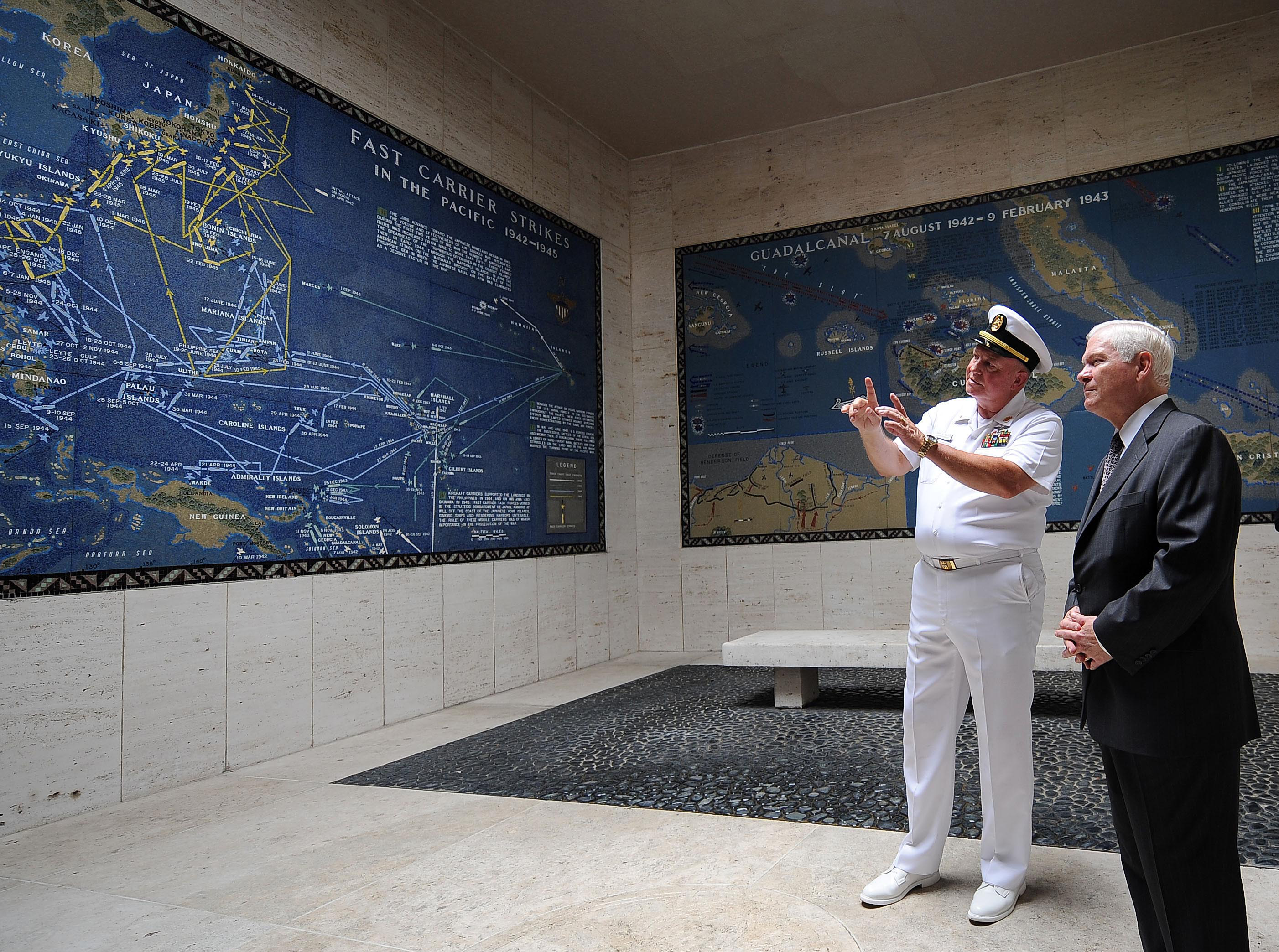
Margaret Bruton's terrazzo maps at Manila American Cemetery

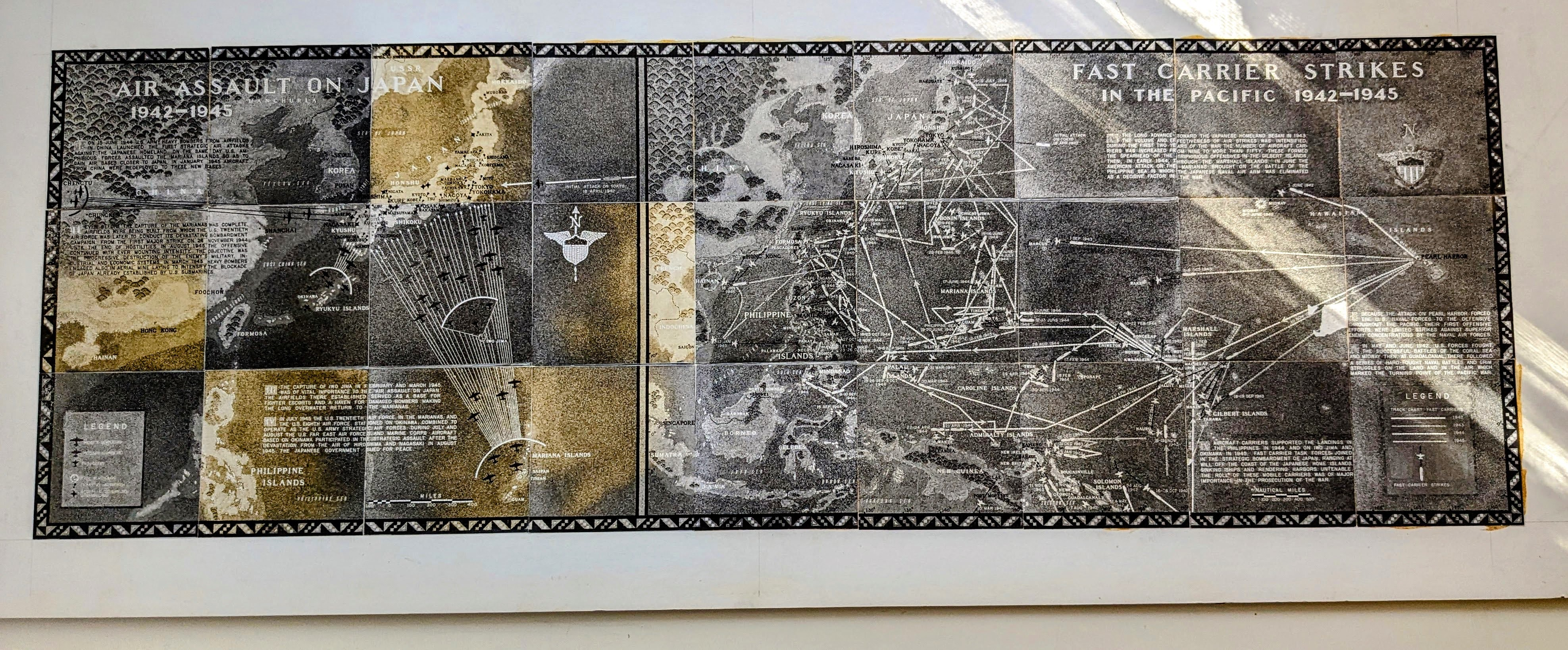
Air Assault on Japan, a map draft for Manila American Cemetery

In the 1950s the Bruton sister worked for three years on about 22 mosaics and terrazzo maps for the memorial at the Manila American Cemetery. The maps, were created using information from the American Battle Monuments Commission, were produced by the P. Grassi American Terrazzo Company in South San Francisco. Made from tinted concrete with vibrant colored aggregates, they incorporate military data through mosaic or ceramic details. The borders and compass designs reference Pacific Islands' art styles, and accompanying descriptive texts, made of plastic, elaborate on the maps' details. The Margaret Bruton Collection, housed in the Mayo Hayes O'Donnell Library Doud House Archive Storage in Monterey, contains photo prints of 27 of these maps.

Bruton created terrazzo tables, including some for clients of Frances Elkins who had her design studio in the Robert Louis Stevenson House in Monterey between 1927 and 1947.

== Death ==
Bruton died in Monterey, California, on August 29, 1983. She was cremated at the Little Chapel by-the Sea. She is buried at the Cemetery El Encinal in Monterey.
