= Mother's Building =

1925 building with murals in San Francisco

- U.S. National Register of Historic Places
- San Francisco Designated Landmark
- California Historical Landmark
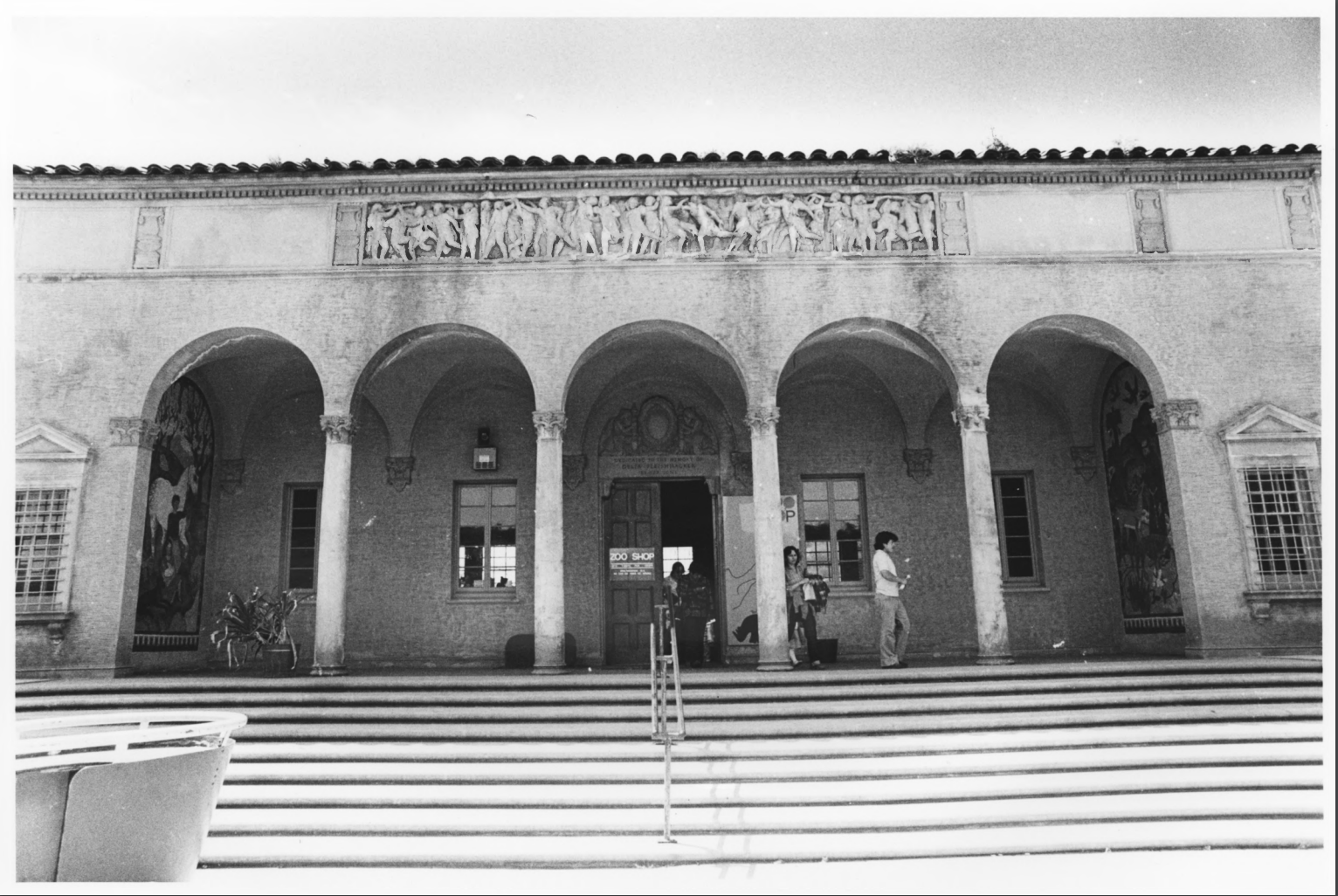
- Mother's Building exterior (1979), when it served as the gift shop and visitor center for the San Francisco Zoo

- Location within San Francisco County Location within California Location within the United States
- Location: San Francisco Zoo, Zoo Rd. and Sloat Blvd., San Francisco, California, U.S.
- Coordinates: 37°44′05″N 122°30′09″W
- Area: 0.3 acres (0.12 ha)
- Built: 1925
- Architect: George W. Kelham
- Architectural style: Late 19th And 20th Century Revivals, Italian Renaissance\Tuscan
- NRHP reference No.: 79000529
- SFDL No.: 304
- CHISL No.: 847

Significant dates
- Added to NRHP: December 31, 1979
- Designated SFDL: September 16, 2022
- Designated CHISL: December 31, 1979

The Mother's Building, also known as the Delia Fleishhacker Memorial Building, is a historic building that was once part of the Fleishhacker Pool and Fleishhacker Playfield and features Works Progress Administration-era murals, built in 1925. It is presently located within the San Francisco Zoo and Gardens.

The building has been listed as a San Francisco Designated Landmark, since September 16, 2022; a listed California Historical Landmark since December 31, 1979; and listed in the National Register of Historic Places, since December 31, 1979.

== History ==
The Mother's Building was originally part of the Fleishhacker Pool and Fleishhacker Playfield, commissioned by Herbert Fleishhacker, and Mortimer Fleishhacker; and built in 1925. It was in dedication to their late-mother, Delia Stern Fleishhacker. The Mother's Building was originally located next to a large wading pool. It served as a lounge (with restrooms, nurseries, clinical rooms, and tea) for mothers with small children; no boys over the age of 6 were allowed inside. The wading pool was removed in the 1940s, and was replaced with a children's zoo by the 1960s.

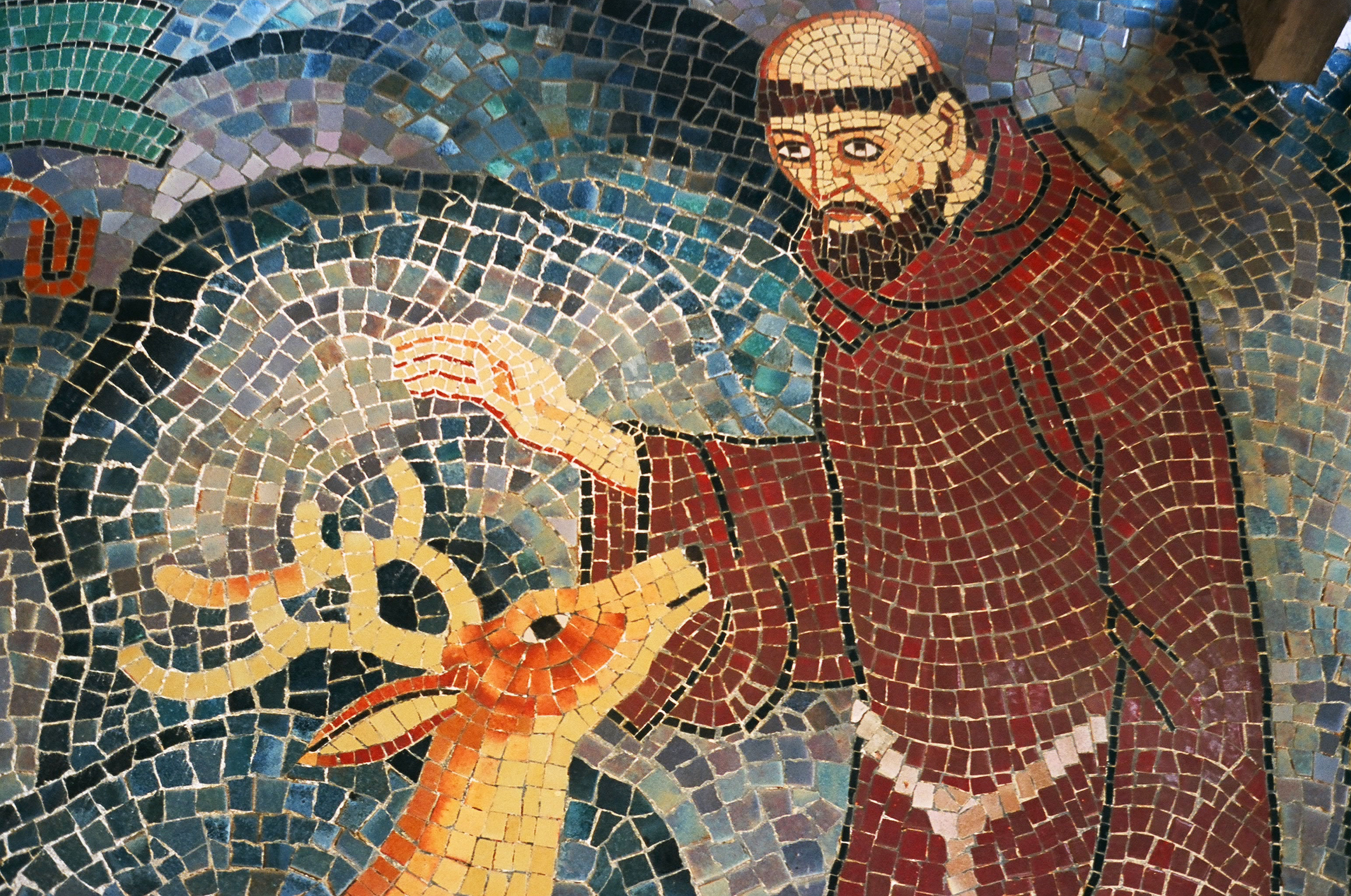
Close up of the Saint Francis mosaic by the Bruton sisters

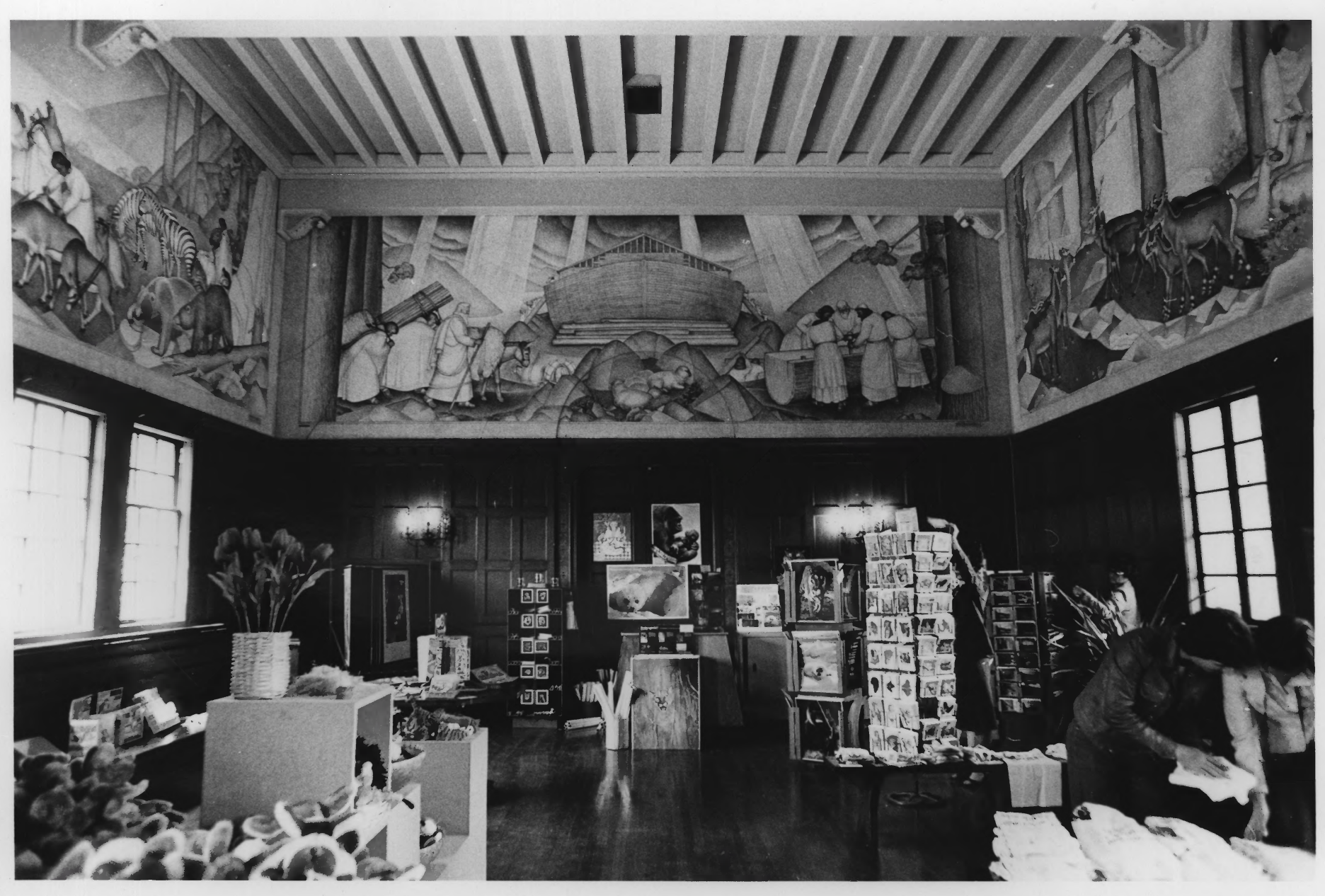
Mother's Building interior (1979), as the gift shop for the San Francisco Zoo

The building is a single room that was designed by American architect George W. Kelham. The style of the building is late 19th-century or early 20th-century Italian Renaissance Revival architecture. The exterior features a red Mission tiled roof, and five arches with Corinthian columns and pilasters.

=== Mosaics ===
The loggia's side walls are decorated with mosaics created by Helen Bell Bruton, Margaret Bruton, and Esther Bruton for the Public Works of Art Project; with imagery of Saint Francis of Assisi with animals, and another panel with children and animals. The Bruton sisters were originally from Alameda, California and had helped revitalize the art of decorative mosaics.

=== Murals ===
On the interior, there is wood paneling, with carved flower details around the door frames; and with four painted murals in the upper section depicting four scenes of Noah's Ark and animals. The four interior murals were painted with egg tempera, which were begun in 1933 and completed in 1938, painted by Helen Katharine Forbes and Dorothy Wagner Puccinelli for the Federal Art Project.

It is believed that the interior murals may be beyond the point of repairs as the paintings have faded, the walls have deteriorated in places, and some of the damages maybe due to the proximity to the ocean. However other WPA-era murals, such as those at Beach Chalet and Coit Tower have gone through restoration.

=== Zoo gift shop and visitors center ===
From 1973 until 2002, the Mother's Building served as a gift shop and visitors center for the zoo. The building is in need of seismic safe updates and the interior murals need restoration; more recently the room is only used for special events.

The Mother's Building is the only remaining structure from the Fleishhacker Pool and Fleishhacker Playfield complex. The Mother's Building is a historic building listed as a San Francisco Designated Landmark and is listed in the National Register of Historic Places.

Another structure with a similar historical use is the 1888 William Sharon Children's House and playground, now known as the Sharon Art Studio in Golden Gate Park.

== See also ==
- California Historical Landmarks in San Francisco
- List of San Francisco Designated Landmarks
- National Register of Historic Places listings in San Francisco
