= The Peacemakers (mural) =

1939 mural by the Bruton sisters

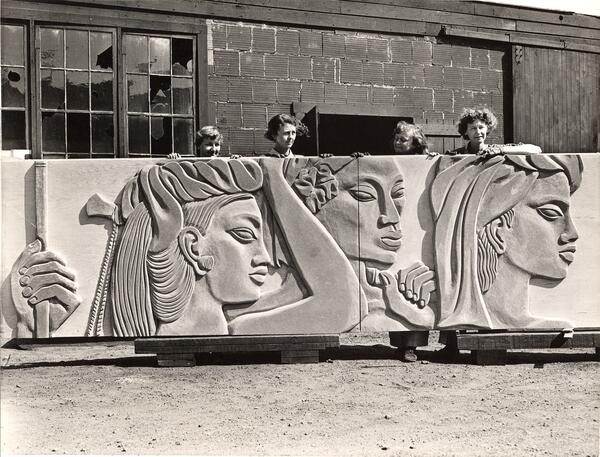
- The Bruton Sisters' "The Peacemakers" at the 1939-1940 Golden Gate International Exposition
- Artist: Helen Bruton, Esther Bruton, Margaret Bruton
- Year: 1939
- Type: Bas relief mural
- Location: Court of Pacifica, Golden Gate International Exposition, San Francisco

The Peacemakers was a historic mural created by the Bruton sisters for the 1939 Golden Gate International Exposition in San Francisco. Housed within Timothy Pflueger's Court of Pacifica, the mural was a dramatic work spanning 144 feet wide by 57 feet tall, representing the collaborative peace between the countries of the East and West.

== Background ==
Architect Timothy Pflueger commissioned sisters Helen Bell Bruton, Margaret Bruton, and Esther Bruton to create the mural as a centerpiece for the exposition. The original plan called for two murals, but budget cuts led to the creation of only one. The sisters were awarded $20,000 for the project.

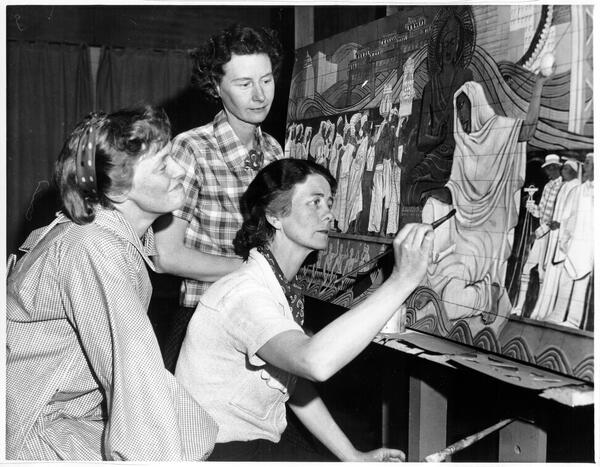
Seated in the foreground is Esther Bruton; Helen Bruton is wielding the brush; while Margaret Bruton stands watching the work with a critical eye. 1938. San Francisco Public Library.

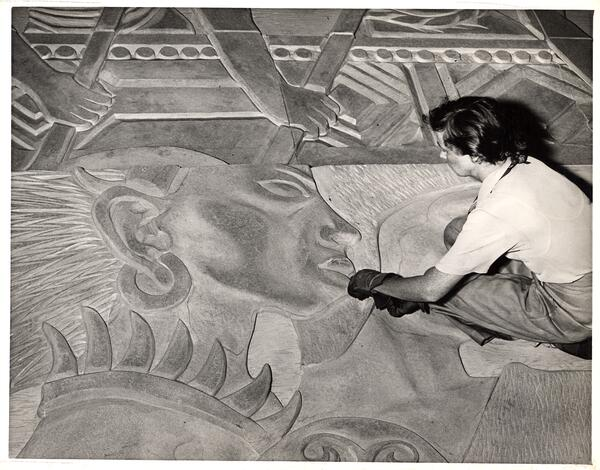
Esther Bruton is shown here with a section of "The Peacemakers", a mural relief presented during the Golden Gate International Exposition.

== Design ==
The mural, named The Peacemakers, combined elements from Eastern and Western cultures, symbolizing peace across the Pacific. At its center stood two large figures, a Buddha and a kneeling woman, flanked by friezes of 24-foot tall figures and famous architectural landmarks. The Bruton sisters utilized a unique technique, carving the design into masonite panels to create a bas relief effect, allowing for depth and shadow play when illuminated. The Bruton sisters collectively created The Peacemakers mural for the 1939 Golden Gate International Exposition.

The great colored relief of the Peacemakers, at the entrance to Treasure Island’s Court of the Pacific is the work of three artists known to their friends and public as The Brutons. This collective term rather conceals the separate personalities of Margaret, Helen and Esther Bruton — but the truth is that since they are sisters, all blondes, all equally expert artists and craftsmen, and usually to be found working in a state of quite unsisterly harmony on some large commission, the average mind is incapable of disentangling one Bruton from the others.

== Reception ==
At the fair, The Peacemakers was recognized as one of the most outstanding works and became a symbol of the exposition's artistic achievements. Despite its grand scale, some contemporary critics have later critiqued the mural for its simplistic and naive portrayal of eastern cultures, reflective of the period's Eurocentric views.

== Legacy ==
The Peacemakers remains a significant work for its depiction of cultural unity and peace, despite its historical and cultural critiques. It stands as a testament to the vision and skill of the artists and the ambition of the 1939 Golden Gate International Exposition.
