= Herman Wendelborg Hansen =

- Born: 1854; Dithmarschen, Duchy of Holstein, Denmark (now Germany)
- Died: April 22, 1924; Oakland, California
- Education: Art Institute of Chicago
- Notable work: The Pony Express
- Style: Western
- Spouse: Olga Josue

Herman Wendelborg Hansen (1854-1924) was a 19th-century artist, well known for his Western-themed paintings featuring horses, cowboys, and the frontier.

== Early life and education ==
Hansen was born in Dithmarschen, Duchy of Holstein. From an early age, he was gifted in art. His father, a rector and draftsman, encouraged his son's talent, and sent him to Hamburg at the age of 16. Here, Hansen studied battle scenes from the artist, Simmonsen. In 1876, Hansen went to England for school, but was intrigued by the American West. He was inspired by James Fenimore Cooper's novel, Leatherstocking Tales. The following year, Hansen emigrated to New York City, where he worked as a commercial illustrator. He eventually moved to Chicago, and studied at the Art Institute of Chicago.

== Career ==
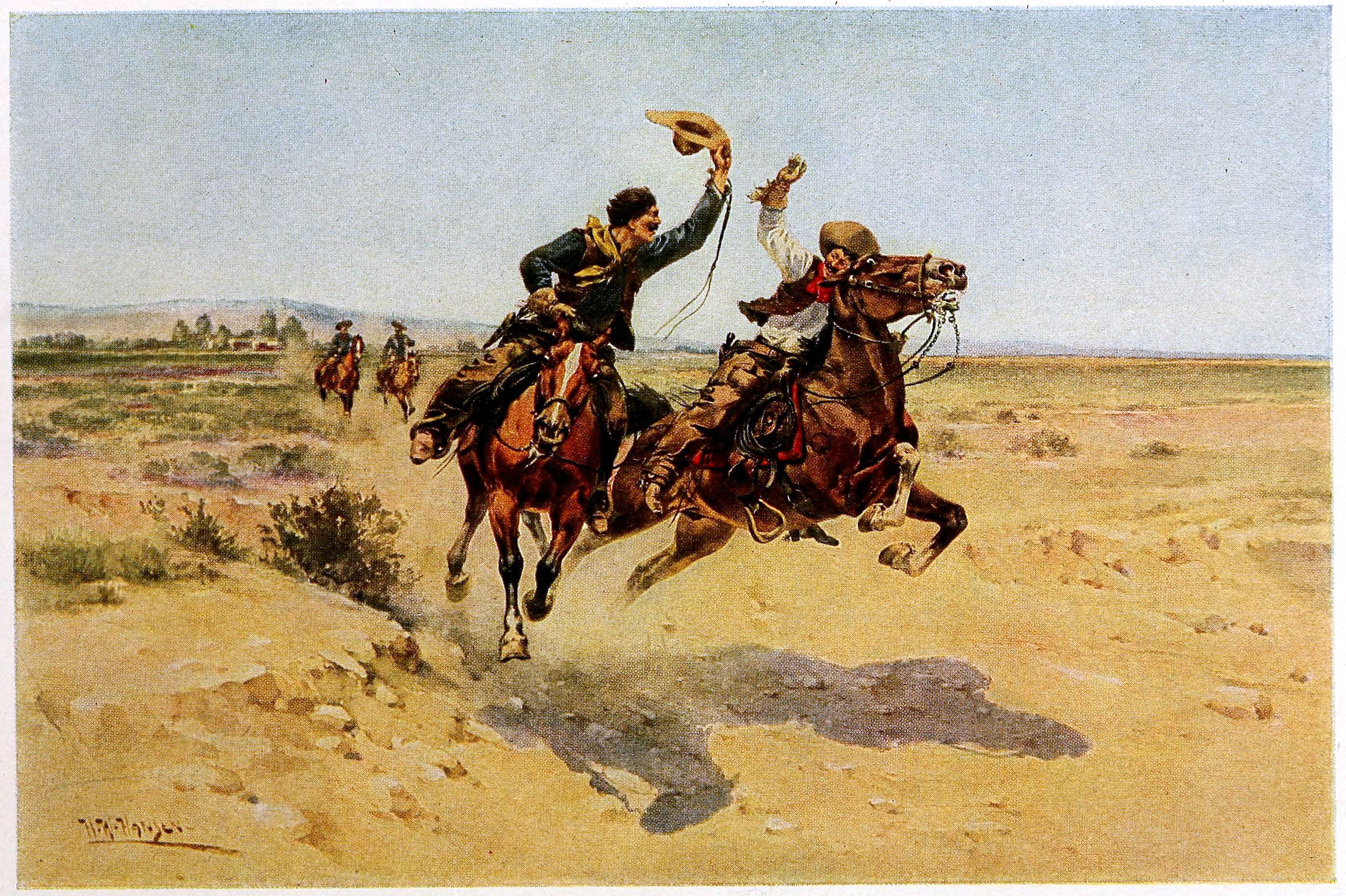
When Spring Comes to the Cattle Country, by H. W. Hansen, published in Outing magazine in 1910

In 1879, Hansen received commission from the Northwestern Railways to paint a series of transportation advertisements. He was sent to the Dakotas. He did much traveling throughout the West, South, and North. Hansen visited Montana, Texas, New Mexico, and Arizona, before settling down in San Francisco, California, at the age of 28. After moving to California, Hansen continued to make trips through the Southwest and the Northern Plains. His trips gave him the information to create historically accurate portrayals of the West. Hansen's most famous painting titled, Pony Express, was completed in 1900. Numerous copies have been produced worldwide.

Hansen was friends with artists, William Keith and Maynard Dixon, but each had different styles.

In 1901, Hansen held his first exhibition.

He spent the summer of 1903 at the Crow Agency in Montana.

Hansen moved to Alameda, California, after his studio was destroyed by an earthquake and fire. This same year and onward, his paintings were sold yearly in the East and Europe.

The subject of his artwork was mainly the "mythic West." Hansen's paintings successfully captured horses and cowboys in action through specific details and realistic depictions. He became known for being one of the earliest fine artists to "popularize cowboy action scenes" and Wild West imagery. Hansen regularly painted in watercolor, but later in life he began to use oils and etching in his art.

Hansen has been called the "Frederic Remington of the West Coast," but there are differences in their styles. Hansen was a strict Western genre painter. Artist Eugen Neuhaus said of Hansen's artwork: "His concern was more with photographic records of frontier life than with the beauties of design and color."

By 1908, Hansen felt differently about the West. He remarked, "Tucson is killed from my point of view. They have shut down all the gambling houses tight, and not a gun in sight. Why the place hasn't the pictorial value of a copper cent any longer." His work can be found in the collection of the California Historical Society.

== Personal life ==
At the age of 28, Hansen married Olga Josue. They had two kids together: Frieda and Armin. Their son, Armin Hansen (1886-1957), would become one of the best West Coast marine painters and etchers.

Hansen died on April 22, 1924, in Oakland, California. He was 70 years old. In his last few months, his etchings were done "under the tutelage" of his son.
