= Hotel Union Square =

Hotel in San Francisco, California, USA

Coordinates: 37.78586°N 122.40777°W

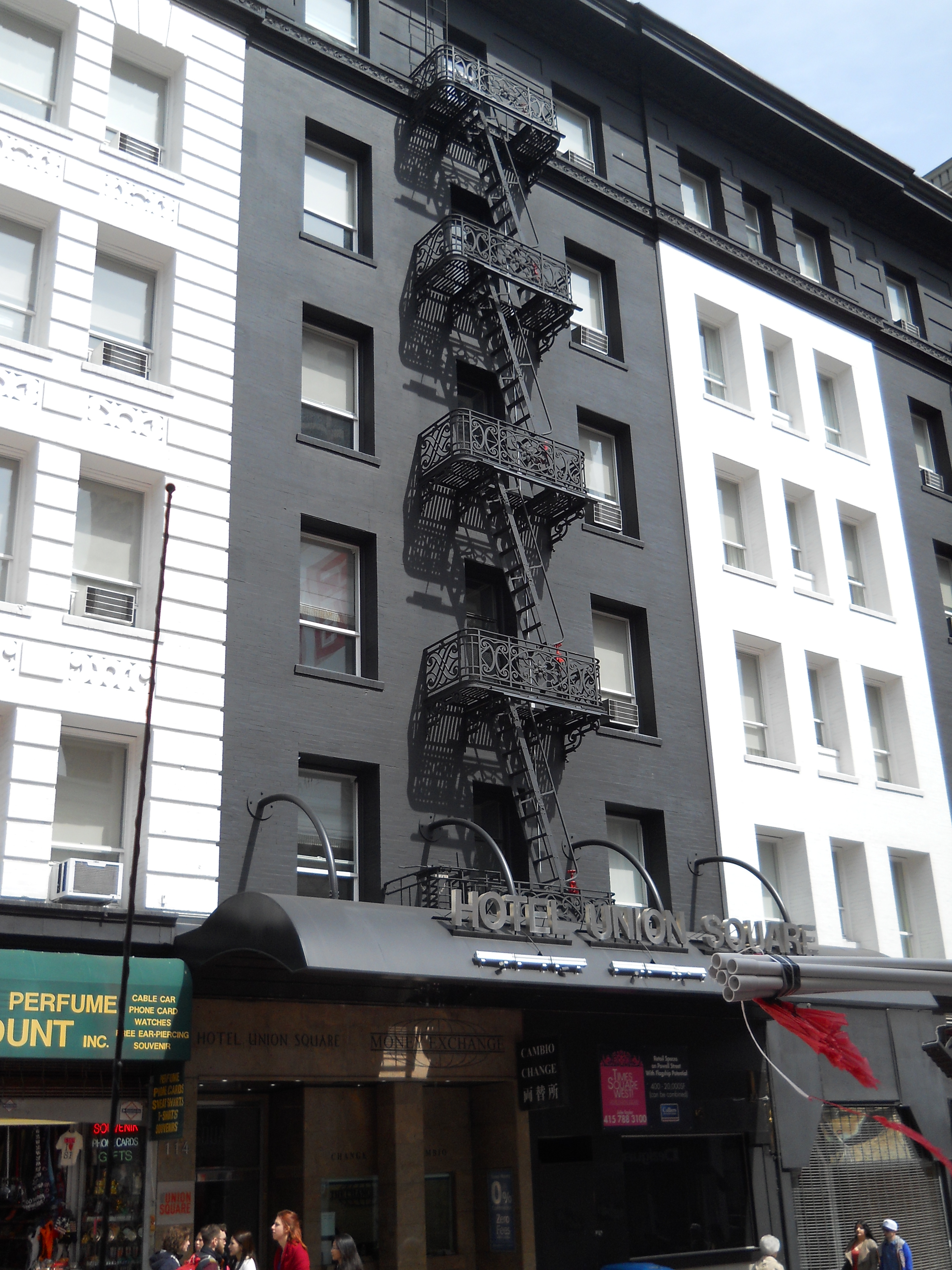
Hotel Union Square

Hotel Union Square is located at 114 Powell Street in San Francisco, California. It was built in 1908, had a speakeasy in the basement during the Prohibition Era, and Dashiell Hammett was a patron.

== History ==
The hotel was built in 1908 as the Golden West Hotel, for the 1915 Panama–Pacific International Exposition. During the Prohibition Era, a 10,000 square feet (930 m^{2}) speakeasy called The Golden Bubble was located below the hotel. The original terrazzo floors and wallpaper still remain in what is now used as a storage area. In 1935, Egyptian-style mosaics by Helen Bell Bruton were added in the entryway.

In the 1950s, the hotel was renamed the Golden State Hotel. Personality Hotels purchased the building in the early 1980s and in 1985 reopened it after refurbishment as Hotel Union Square. It was extensively renovated in 2008, when a Dashiell Hammett Suite was created in Room 505. The interior design is by Colum McCartan, along with Lisa Sayed, partner of the hotel interior design company Sisterhood of the Traveling Hotels, who designed the Ring In the Kids Suite. Lisa Compagno designed the Dashiell Hammett Suite. There are 131 guest rooms and suites.

Dashiell Hammett and Lillian Hellman may have conducted much of their love affair at the hotel, and he booked his bride-to-be Josephine Dolan into a suite there on the night before their 1921 wedding.

The hotel is reputedly haunted, particularly Room 207. Some attribute a ghost in that room to Hellman.

== See also ==
- Reportedly haunted locations in the San Francisco Bay Area
