= John James Cunningham =

Carmel artist (1904-2004

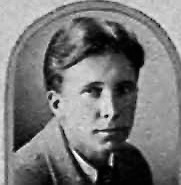
- Cunningham in 1927
- Born: John James O'Farrell Cunningham; April 5, 1904; Cliffwood, New Jersey, US
- Died: January 22, 2004 (aged 99); Carmel-by-the-Sea, California, US
- Education: University of California, Berkeley
- Occupation(s): Artist, teacher
- Known for: Carmel Art Institute
- Spouses: Patricia Stanley (m. 1930; div. 1959) Patricia Ann Duncan Peterson (m. 1961)
- Children: 3

John Cunningham (1904-2004) was an American painter, teacher, and director of the Carmel Art Institute in Carmel-by-the-Sea, California, United States. In 1990, He became president emeritus and transferred the responsibility of the Carmel Art Institute to the Carmel Art Association.

== Early life and education ==
Cunningham was born on April 5, 1904, in New Jersey. In 1923, he attended the Manhattan College for two years.

While attending Berkeley, he met Patricia "Pat" Stanley (1907-1984).

=== European influences ===
Following graduation, in 1929 Cunningham received a traveling fellowship, enabling he and Pat to study with the same teachers as Hans Hofmann at the Schule für Bildende Kunst (School of Fine Art) in Munich, André Lhote at the Académie Notre-Dame des Champs in Paris, and Beniamino Bufano in Cagnes-sur-Mer, France. In 1930 he exhibited his paintings in Munich. Bufano had a studio in southern France and taught Cunningham stone carving.

== Artistic career ==
In 1930, during the Great Depression, Cunningham and his wife Patricia returned from Paris to New York City. He worked as a decorator, created murals, for Gimbels and Macy's in New York City department stores. He also worked for Livingston Manor, New York, and the Firestone Winery in Los Olivos. This period of mural execution spanned from 1931 to 1933.

In November 1932 he had a solo exhibition at the De Young Museum in San Francisco.

From 1938 to 1939, he accepted a job of staff artist for the State of California Governor's Commission at the University of California for the Golden Gate International Exposition on Treasure Island in San Francisco.

By 1940, the institute was holding six week summer classes outdoors, teaching figure and landscape painting.

In September 1992, Cunningham organized an auction and benefit for the Blind Children's Center of Los Angeles, featuring his paintings, at Graystone Mission in Beverly Hills, California.

== Death and legacy ==
On January 22, 2004, Cunningham died at the age of 99 at Hospice House. His dedication to art, education, and community engagement earned him the title of President Emeritus of the Carmel Art Institute.
