= Clayton Sumner Price =

American painter (1874–1950)

Clayton Sumner "C. S." Price (1874 – 1950) was an American expressionist painter from Oregon.

== Biography ==
Price was born on May 11, 1874, near Bedford, Iowa, and raised on farms and ranches there and in Wyoming and Alberta, Canada. In 1905, a local rancher loaned Price money so he could attend the St. Louis School of Fine Arts. Price attended the school during the 1905–1906 academic year; it would be his only formal training. In 1909, Price moved to Portland, Oregon, to work as an illustrator for The Pacific Monthly magazine. Price's illustrations of the magazine's Western stories were reminiscent of the work of Charles Marion Russell. Price left Portland in 1910, painting and working for room and board on the farms and ranches of his siblings in British Columbia and California for the next eight years. Price visited Monterey, California, in 1918. Price returned to Portland in 1929. During the 1930s, Price completed a series of large paintings as part of the Public Works of Art Project and the Federal Art Project. These works currently are displayed in Timberline Lodge, the Multnomah County Library, Pendleton High School, and the Portland Art Museum. He died on May 1, 1950.

Price's long tenure in the San Francisco Bay Area and on the Monterey Peninsula had the most profound impact on the development of his art. He visited San Francisco for the Panama–Pacific International Exposition in the spring of 1915 and decided to stay. The following January he displayed two "remarkable" studies of domestic animals at the Exhibition of California Artists at the Memorial Museum. This was soon followed by an exhibit of "pastoral scenes" at Helgesen's Gallery. From 1917 to 1920 he studied as an occasional student at the California School of Fine Arts (today's San Francisco Art Institute) under Pedro Joseph de Lemos, Lee Fritz Randolph, and Frank Van Sloun, and was awarded a second prize at the school's annual exhibit in 1920. According to the U.S. Census that year he was unmarried and resided in San Francisco near his mentor and teacher, the renowned artist Gottardo Piazzoni.

By 1921 he was sharing a Monterey studio and residential address with artist William Gaskin and the Fauvist painter August Gay, a member of the Society of Six, at the old French Hotel, known as the Stevenson House. Price was first described as a very quiet "Bible-reading man" who painted illustrative cowboy scenes. He earned money by working at the local cannery and making picture frames. He studied with the popular Post-Impressionist painter Armin Hansen. In April 1922 he was one of three Monterey artists invited by Pedro Joseph de Lemos to exhibit at Stanford University, where, according to one critic, his ten displayed works were reminiscent of Frederic Remington. Shortly thereafter he exhibited at the: Del Monte Art Gallery (Monterey); Carmel Arts and Crafts Club; and California Gallery of American Art (San Francisco).

By 1924 his art had changed radically and the press now described his works as having simplified compositions, blocks of either crude or harmonious colors, and juxtaposed planes that rendered distorted perspectives. His art was attracting wealthy buyers. At this time he was in a very public and romantic relationship with the artist Ina Perham. In the summer of 1925 his decidedly Expressionist canvases, along with his earlier paintings, were given a one-man show at San Francisco's Galerie des Beaux Arts. When critics evaluated his new works, they called him a "colorist" with no interest in drawing, but they also claimed that he "set a high mark for Modernists." His huge scaled model of the town of "old Monterey" was displayed on the Peninsula.

In 1927 Price spent so much time in Berkeley and contributed to so many exhibits in the university town that he became a cult figure in the local art colony. That January his one-month show at the Berkeley League of Fine Arts attracted so much interest and so many students that it was extended into April; critics were enthralled by his purity, rhythm and progressive forms.

Ten of Hansen's most reformist students formed the somewhat amorphous "Monterey Group," which included Price and Perham, and in May 1927 staged a highly publicized exhibit at the Galerie des Beaux Arts. Although much of the exhibit was panned, Price's canvas entitled Ploughing was called "quite an achievement." That summer a jury accepted his art for the exhibit at the California State Fair. Although he moved to Portland in 1929 he maintained an active schedule of exhibitions in northern California. Price holds an honorary degree from Reed College.

== Style and collections ==
His style grew throughout his life, moving through impressionism to expressionism. According to The Oregon Encyclopedia: "C.S. Price may be Oregon's most important and influential painter...[He] was nationally known in the 1940s."

Price's work can be found in the Northwest Collection of the Hallie Ford Museum of Art in Salem, Oregon.
