= Frank Van Sloun =

American painter, muralist and etcher

- Born: 1879; Saint Paul, Minnesota
- Died: 1938 (aged 58–59); San Francisco, California, U.S.
- Education: Art Students League of New York; Chase School of Art
- Occupation: Painter

Frank Van Sloun (1879-1938) was an American painter, muralist and etcher. He painted murals in California. His paintings and etchings are in museums in California, Missouri and Washington, D.C..

== Life ==
Van Sloun was born in 1879 in Saint Paul, Minnesota. He was influenced by Rembrandt from a young age, and he studied at the Art Students League of New York and the Chase School of Art, later known as the Parsons School of Design.

Van Sloun became an artist in New York City, and he moved to San Francisco in 1911. He taught at the California School of Fine Arts, and he joined the California Society of Etchers. He had a studio at 166 Geary Street in San Francisco. He painted murals in the Oakland City Hall, the Bohemian Club in San Francisco, and the California State Library in Sacramento. With Maynard Dixon, he did the murals of the dining-room in the Mark Hopkins Hotel, in San Francisco.

For art historian John Maxwell Desgrey, "Van Sloun's greatness as an American artist did not only lie in his skills, training, and God-given talent as an artist, but more importantly in his American roots. He was completely a product of America, not only in his art training but in his subject matter and technique."

Van Sloun died in August 1938 in San Francisco, at age 59. He was buried in the Holy Cross Cemetery. His artwork is in the permanent collections of the National Gallery of Art and the National Portrait Gallery in Washington, D.C. It is also in the Norton Simon Museum in Pasadena, the Mills College Art Museum in Oakland, Saint Mary's College Museum of Art in Moraga, and the Nelson-Atkins Museum of Art in Kansas City, Missouri.
