= Beatrice Judd Ryan =

Australian American art dealer, curator

Beatrice Judd Ryan (née Beatrice Bromfield; c.1880 – December 1, 1966) was an Australian-born American gallerist, art dealer, curator, arts philanthropist, and poet. She was best known for her work in prompting modern art, as a founding director of Galerie Beaux Arts in San Francisco, and as an organizer of the 1940 "Art in Action" program at the Golden Gate International Exposition (GGIE). She was nicknamed "Mrs. San Francisco", for her tirelessly support of West Coast artists.

== Biography ==
Beatrice Judd Ryan was born c. 1880 in Melbourne, Australia to parents Mary (née Ware) and Davenport Bromfield. In 1882, when she was a toddler, her family moved to California and settled in San Mateo County. Her mother established the first Christian Science Church on the peninsula (in the San Francisco Bay Area).

Ryan was a graduate of Castilleja School, a private preparatory high school in Palo Alto; and a graduate of Stanford University, where she majored in English (AB degree, 1902). She did not have formal education in art history or art. In 1906, she married Arthur Judd Ryan, a classmate. Together they had two children and settled in New York City. After her husband's death, the family moved to San Francisco.

She was the founding director of Galerie Beaux Arts, a cooperative nonprofit gallery on Maiden Lane in San Francisco, active from 1925 to 1933. Maynard Dixon was also involved with the gallery in providing guidance. Their mission was to show modernist art, this was the first contemporary art gallery in the city.

An image of Ryan is painted into the park scene (in the far left, sitting in the artist group) in the Beach Chalet murals (1936), by Lucien Labaudt.

During the Golden Gate International Exposition (GGIE) in 1939 to 1940, Ryan served as the State Director of Exhibitions, and she organized the "Art in Action" program. In 1945, she worked at the Rotunda Gallery at the City of Paris store in San Francisco.

After her death in 1966, she bequeathed money to multiple museums in San Francisco the "Beatrice Judd Ryan Bequest Fund purchase", with the clause that the museum had to regularly buy West Coast modern art for their collections.

== Publications ==
- Ryan, Beatrice Judd (1950). Playtime and Praytime (poetry). San Francisco, CA: Wallace Kibbee & Son.
- Ryan, Beatrice Judd (March 1959). "The Rise of Modern Art in the Bay Area". California Historical Society Quarterly. 38 (1). University of California Press: 1–5. doi:10.2307/25155221. JSTOR 25155221.
