= Armin Hansen =

American painter (1886–1957)

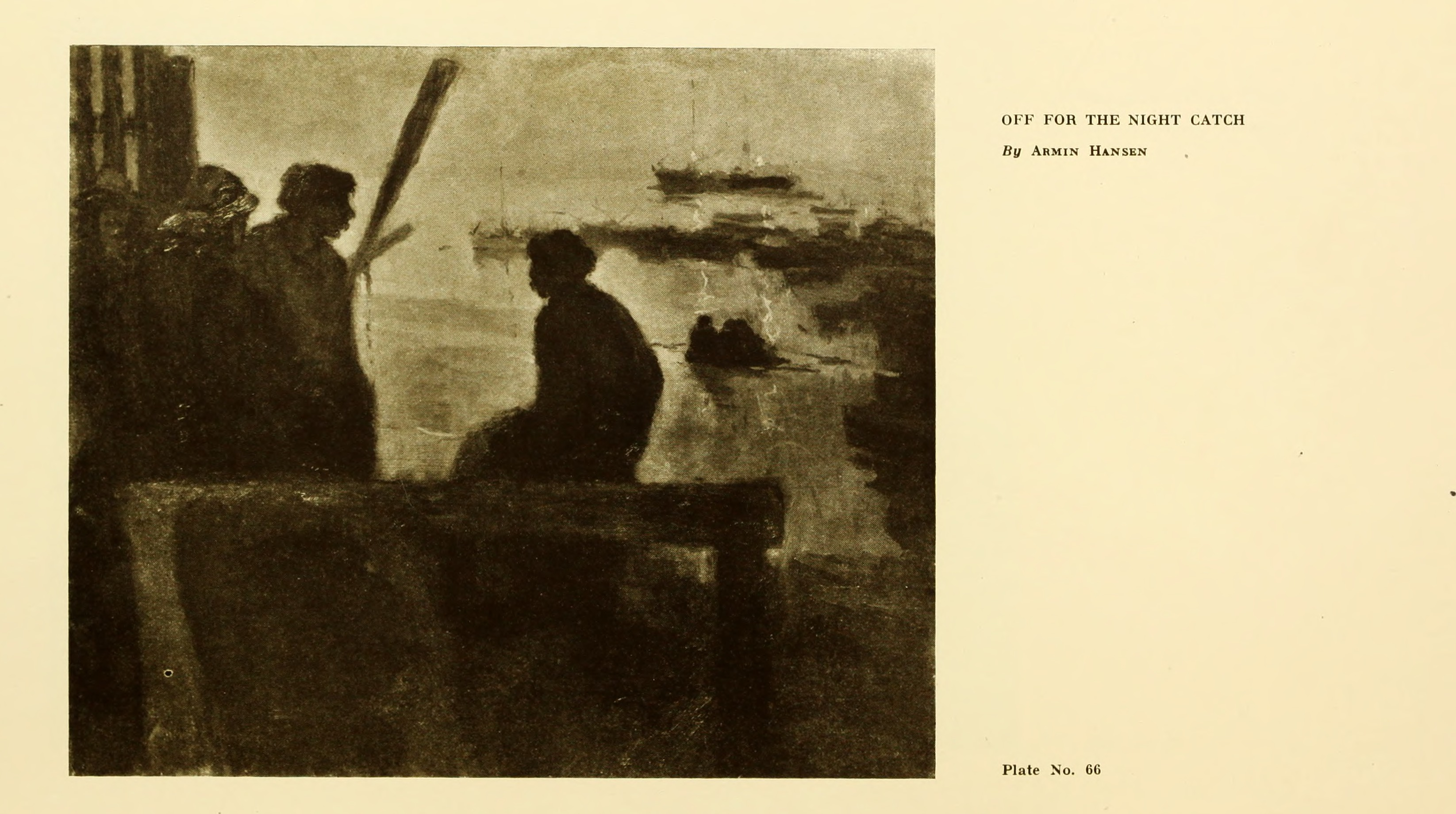
- Off for the Night Catch by Armin Hansen
- Born: Armin Carl Hansen; October 23, 1886; San Francisco, California, U.S.
- Died: April 23, 1957 (aged 70); Monterey, California, U.S.
- Education: California School of Design (under Frederick Meyer and Arthur Frank Mathews); State Academy of Fine Arts Stuttgart (under Carlos Grethe); Academy of Fine Arts, Munich (briefly)
- Known for: Painting, Etching
- Notable work: The Salmon Trawlers (1923); Sardine Barge (c. 1933)
- Movement: En plein air

Armin Carl Hansen (1886–1957) was an American prominent painter of the en plein air school, and a native of San Francisco, best known for his marine canvases. His father Herman Wendelborg Hansen was also an artist of the American West. Armin Hansen studied at the California School of Design (now the San Francisco Art Institute), and in Europe. He achieved international recognition for his scenes depicting men and the sea off the northern coast of California. He was elected an Associate to the National Academy of Design in 1926 and an Academician in 1948.

== Early years ==
He was born Armin Carl Hansen in San Francisco, California, on October 23, 1886, and relocated 1891 with his family to the nearby island town of Alameda. Here his father gave young Armin his first training in drawing and watercolors.

At the Mark Hopkins Institute he studied under several teachers, including the highly respected arts & crafts designer Frederick Meyer and the Tonalist painter Arthur Frank Mathews, from 1901 until his abrupt departure in the spring of 1905, when he was arrested for hazing fellow students. Two unsuccessful attempts by the San Francisco District Attorney to prosecute Hansen for causing permanent and severe bodily injury to the young artist Albert DeRome created much negative publicity. These events combined with the April 1906 San Francisco earthquake and fire persuaded Hansen to leave his Alameda home and study in Europe.

Moving to Germany, he became the student of Carlos Grethe at the State Academy of Fine Arts Stuttgart in Stuttgart, Germany, and briefly studied at the Academy of Fine Arts in Munich. Wishing to see the world through marine eyes, he periodically served as a deck hand between 1908 and 1912 on a number of commercial vessels, one being a Norwegian steam trawler. His prolonged visits to the art centers in Berlin, London, Paris, Amsterdam, and Bruges during his six years abroad led him to adopt many of the tenets of Modernist art. He spent a considerable amount of time at the art colony in Nieuwpoort, Belgium.

== Life in Northern California ==
Hansen arrived in San Francisco in the late fall of 1912 and during the following spring and summer he held very successful exhibitions of his European canvases at three of the most prestigious galleries: Helgesen's, Rabjohn & Morcom's, and Schussler Brothers. During his lifetime his paintings and prints appeared in over a hundred exhibitions in California and nationally.

In 1913 he first visited Monterey, where he eventually settled to teach and to find inspiration in the small fishing community and in the art colonies on the Peninsula. He painted in oils and watercolors and perfected his skills in graphic arts, especially etchings. Hansen became enamored of creating marine scenes, particularly involving man's relationship with the sea. In 1914, he produced a Self Portrait. Hansen became extremely active in large Carmel-by-the-Sea art colony. He was not a founder of the Carmel Art Association in 1927, but eventually joined that organization and served as president and on the board of directors. He was the co-founder of the Carmel Art Institute in 1938. John Cunningham began at the Institute when he helped teach a painting class for Hansen when he fell ill. In 1940, Hansen and the Whitman transferred ownership of the institute to Cunningham and his wife.

In the early 1920s Hansen lived near the Stevenson House, and he often entertained other artists, including members of the Society of Six. By this time Hansen was not only one of the most well known California artists, but arguably the best teacher of the era. A typical Painting of his early period in Monterey, Men of the Sea, illustrates his bond with his subjects. In 1920, he began outdoor lessons for both Clayton Sumner Price and August Francois Gay. E. Charlton Fortune also studied with Hansen. Hansen was also unique in that he had friends in among the avant-garde and conservative artists in Monterey and Carmel. An important work of this period is his The Salmon Trawlers (1923), which is in the permanent collection of the Monterey Museum of Art.

In the 1930s, Hansen's paintings become more intense and use of light more pronounced. One of his masterpieces of this era was Sardine Barge circa 1933, which appropriately is in the permanent collection of the Monterey Museum of Art. His work was also part of the painting event in the art competition at the 1932 Summer Olympics.

Later in Monterey Hansen led a group of artists in opposing a plan to remove Fisherman's Wharf as part of a grandiose redevelopment scheme. The wharf was an important subject of their art, besides the fact that Hansen identified with the simple life of a fisherman. These artists were considered a bohemian group, living in the Peters Gate area of Monterey, but amazingly they prevailed against bigger business interests.

== Posthumous honors ==
In 1997, a film Time Captured in Paintings: The Monterey Legacy was produced honoring Hansen, along with E. Charlton Fortune, William Frederic Ritschel, Xavier Martinez and others. The film, narrated by actor Jack Lemmon won the Golden Eagle Award from the prestigious CINE for documentary films in 1997.

== Permanent collections ==
- Bowers Museum
- Crocker Art Museum
- Fine Arts Museums of San Francisco
- Los Angeles County Museum of Art
- Monterey Museum of Art
- Museum of Monterey
- National Museum of American Art-Smithsonian
- Oakland Museum of California
- Steven Stern Fine Arts
- The Irvine Museum
- University of Michigan Museum of Art

== Bibliography ==
- Facing Eden, edited by Steven A. Nash, Fine Arts Museums of San Francisco (1995)
- Ilene Susan Fort, Paintings of California, Chameleon Press (1993)
- John Walton, Storied Land: Community and Memory in Monterey, University of California Press (2003)
- Kim Coventry, Monterey Peninsula, Arcadia Publishing (2002) ISBN 0-7385-2080-2
- Nancy Boas, The Society of Six, University of California Press
- Susan Landauer, California Impressionists, University of California Press (1996)
