= Robert Louis Stevenson House =

Historic building in California

- Stevenson House
- U.S. National Register of Historic Places
- U.S. National Historic Landmark
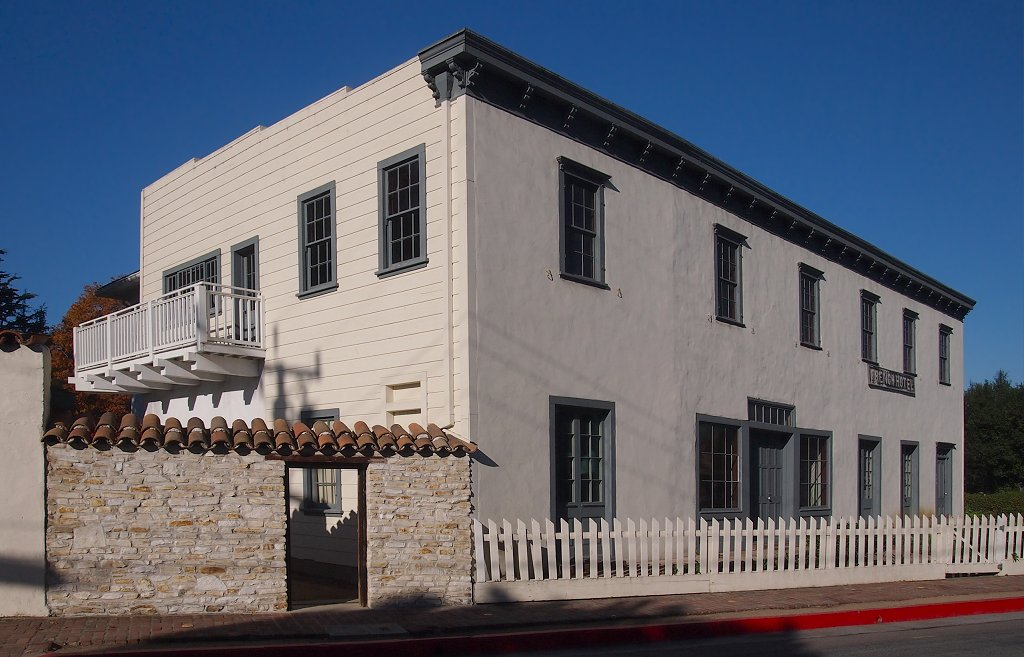
- Stevenson House, Monterey, California.

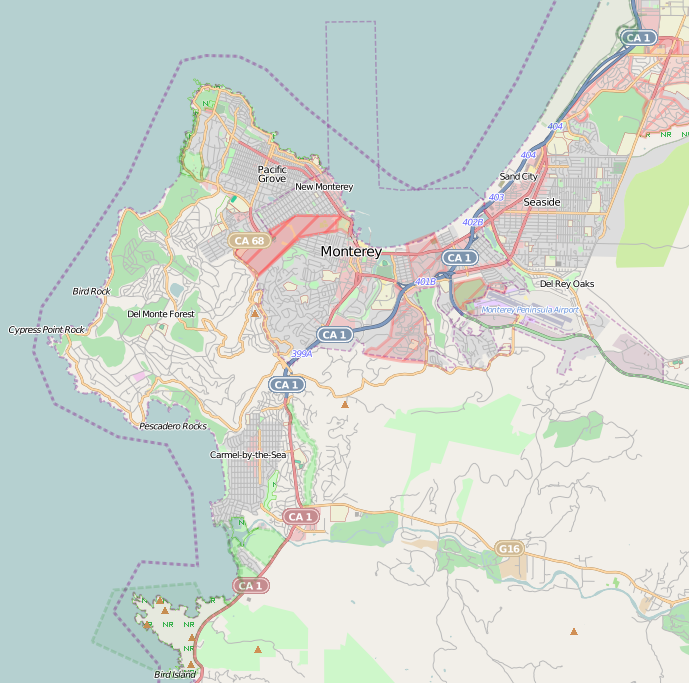
- Location within Monterey Peninsula
- Location: 530 Houston Street, Monterey, California
- Coordinates: 36°35′50″N 121°53′36″W
- Built: circa 1836
- Architectural style: Spanish Colonial Revival architecture
- Website: Stevenson House State Historic Monument
- NRHP reference No.: 72000239
- Added to NRHP: January 7, 1972

The Stevenson House, is a historic two-story Spanish Colonial style building located at 530 Houston Street in Monterey, California. It was a boarding house called the French Hotel, built circa 1836. The Scottish author Robert Louis Stevenson lived there in 1879, writing and courting his future wife. It is now a museum and property of the Monterey State Historic Park. The building was listed on the National Register of Historic Places on January 7, 1972. The building is also listed as California Historical Landmark #352.

== History ==
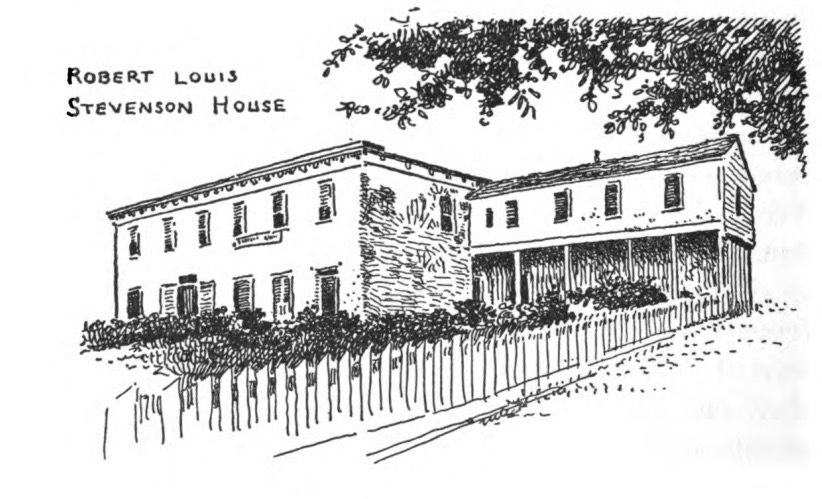
Robert Louis Stevenson House, illustration by Jo Mora.

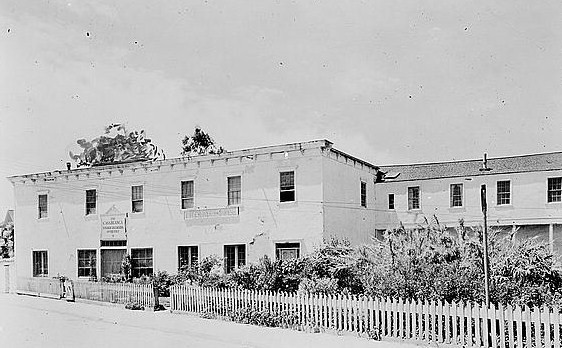
Robert Louis Stevenson House, Photo by Julian P. Graham.

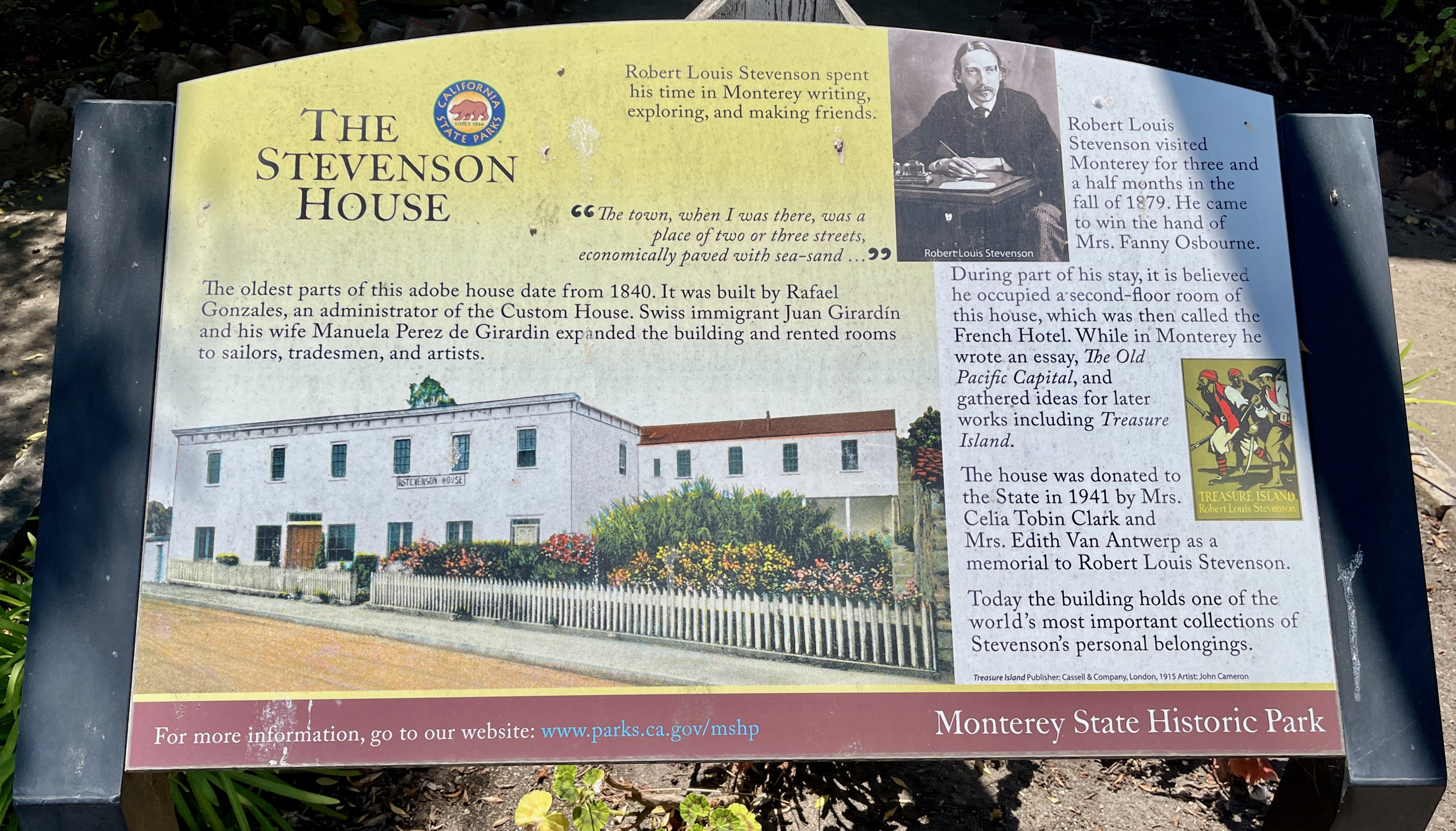
Stevenson House kiosk provided by Monterey State Historic Park.

The original adobe was built circa 1836 by Don Rafael Gonzalez, who was the customs administrator at the Port of Monterey. Some of the walls are of chalk rock, which was laid up in mud mortar. Other walls are of wood frame. The exterior walls are plastered with limestone mortar. The bracketed overhanging roof has wood shingles.

From 1856 to 1870s, merchant Juan Girardin operated a general store on the first floor and lived upstairs. Some additions were made and spare bedrooms were rented, when it became the French Hotel.

In the autumn of 1879, Scottish novelist Robert Louis Stevenson stayed at the French Hotel. Stevenson lived there while recovering from Ill health as he was crossing the United States to court his future wife Fanny Osbourne. While at the hotel, he dined at a nearby restaurant run by Frenchman Jules Simoneau which was located at what is now the Simoneau Plaza. It was at the hotel that Stevenson wrote The Amateur Emigrant; The Pavilion on the Links; Prince Otto; essays on Henry David Thoreau and the Japanese reformer Yoshida Torajiro; The Old Pacific Capitol; and inspiration for Treasure Island.

In 1920s the Monterey Group of painters were meeting at Stevenson's House Some of them were associated with the Society of Six.

In 1937, the hotel was purchased by Edith C. van Antwerp and Mrs. C. Tobin Clark to preserve it as a memorial to Stevenson. They bestowed it to the State of California and it was restored as a home representing the Spanish Colonial period. The hotel was later named the Stevenson House in honor of Robert Louis Stevenson. It holds a large collection of Stevenson papers and Stevenson memorabilia. It features a bas relief depicting the author writing in bed.

An outside kiosk provides information about the Stevenson House, Robert Louis Stevenson, and directions to visit the Monterey State Historic Park website for more information.

== See also ==
- National Register of Historic Places listings in Monterey County, California
- California Historical Landmarks in Monterey County
