= List of people from Laguna Beach, California =

The following is a partial list of notable people who have been full-time or significant part-time residents of Laguna Beach, California, United States.

== Actors ==
- George Beranger
- William Boyd
- Barbara Britton
- America Chedister
- Bette Davis
- Robert Englund
- Douglas Fairbanks, Jr.
- Mike Farrell and Judy Farrell
- Judy Garland
- Sterling Holloway
- Rock Hudson
- Tab Hunter
- Elmo Lincoln
- Fredric March
- Victor Mature
- Kent McCord
- Bette Midler
- Mary Miles Minter
- Polly Moran
- Ozzie Nelson and Harriet Nelson
- Franklin Pangborn
- Gigi Parrish
- Mary Pickford
- Adele Ritchie
- Mickey Rooney
- Ruth Roman
- Rita Rudner
- Charlotte Shelby
- Margaret Shelby
- Grant Sullivan
- Slim Summerville
- Claire Trevor
- Bobs Watson
- Rudolph Valentino

== Artists ==
- Mark Bloch, conceptual artist, writer
- Mark Chamberlain, photographer
- Elanor Colburn, painter, and muralist; early artist in Laguna Beach
- Frank Cuprien, painter and "Dean of Laguna Artists"
- Paul Blaine Henrie, painter
- Abby Williams Hill, painter
- Anna Althea Hills, painter and founder of Laguna Art Museum
- Thomas Lorraine Hunt, painter
- George Hurrell, photographer
- Frank Interlandi, editorial cartoonist
- Bil Keane, cartoonist
- Marie Boening Kendall, painter
- Joseph Kleitsch, painter
- Roger Kuntz, painter
- William Mortensen, photographer
- Edgar Alwin Payne, muralist and founder of Laguna Beach Art Association
- Ruth Eaton Peabody, modernist painter, and sculptor; early artist in Laguna Beach
- William Grant Sherry, painter
- George Gardner Symons, painter
- William Wendt, "Dean of Southern California artists"
- Robert William Wood, painter
- Robert Wyland, muralist
- Karl Yens, painter

== Athletes ==
- Hobie Alter, surfboard and sailboat designer
- Damon Berryhill, baseball player
- Dain Blanton, volleyball player
- Colt Brennan, football player
- Ryan Campbell, soccer player
- Gavvy Cravath, baseball player
- Lindsay Davenport, tennis player
- Paul Deem, Olympic cyclist
- Annika Dries, water polo player
- Dusty Dvorak, volleyball player
- Seth Etherton, baseball pitcher
- Janet Evans, swimmer
- Scott Fortune, volleyball player
- Warren Gill, baseball player
- Tom Harmon, football player and sportscaster
- Nyjah Huston, skateboarder
- Jon Leach, tennis player
- Rick Leach, tennis player
- Tom Morey, inventor of the "Boogie Board"
- John H. Outland, namesake of college football Outland Trophy
- Mike Parsons, surfer
- John Pitts, football player
- Rachel Wacholder, beach volleyball player and model
- Dani Weatherholt, soccer player
- Lefty Williams, baseball player

== Musicians and singers ==
- Frieda Belinfante, conductor and founder of the Orange County Philharmonic Orchestra
- Taylor Hawkins, rock drummer, Foo Fighters
- Marion Hutton, big band singer
- Paula Kelly, big band singer
- Ricky Nelson, pop singer
- Jack Norworth, songwriter (wrote "Take Me Out to the Ballgame")
- Lee Rocker, bassist, The Stray Cats
- Richie Sambora, rock guitarist, Bon Jovi
- Vic Schoen, big band leader
- Ty Segall, singer-songwriter

== Writers ==
- Gregory Benford, author and astrophysicist
- Forrest E. "Skip" Fickling, author
- M. F. K. Fisher, culinary writer
- Arnold Hano, sportswriter
- Lisi Harrison, author
- Hedda Hopper, gossip columnist
- Lawrence Clark Powell, author and librarian
- John Steinbeck, author
- Theodore Taylor, author
- John Weld, journalist
- Tennessee Williams, playwright
- Charles Wright, poet

== Other ==
- George Adamski, ufologist
- Buzz Aldrin, astronaut
- Steve Arterburn, radio talk show host
- Heidi Baker, missionary
- Steve Bannon, political advisor
- Florence "Pancho" Barnes, pioneer aviator
- Warren Buffett, business magnate
- Ron Burkle, business magnate
- David P. Bushnell, businessman
- David O. Carter, federal judge
- Blair Conklin, professional skimboarder
- Jonathan R. Cohen, American diplomat
- Lauren Conrad, reality television personality, Fashion Designer
- William S. Darling, art director
- Bhagavan Das (formerly Michael Riggs), yogi
- Charles Douglass, inventor of the laugh track
- Frank Fertitta III, casino owner
- Joe Francis, founder of Girls Gone Wild
- Christine Fugate, film director
- Pelham D. Glassford, United States Army Brigadier General
- David B. Goldstein, human geneticist
- Bill H. Gross, investor and fund manager
- Sue Gross, investor
- Richard Halliburton, adventurer
- Douglas Hodge (born 1957), CEO of PIMCO
- John Mills Houston, United States Congressman
- Christine Jorgensen, transsexual pioneer
- Thelma Keane, businessperson
- Eiler Larsen, town greeter
- Timothy Leary, psychologist and LSD advocate
- Greg MacGillivray, filmmaker
- Alan MacPherson, patent lawyer
- Peter Navarro, economist and filmmaker
- Ward Ritchie, publisher and bibliophile
- Malcolm St. Clair, film director
- Robert A. Schuller, televangelist
- Walter Terence Stace, philosopher
- Samuel Totten, history professor
- Peter Ueberroth, sports commissioner
- Lila Zali, ballerina
