= Interlandi =

Interlandi is a surname. Notable people with the surname include:

- Frank Interlandi (1924–2010), American editorial cartoonist
- Jeneen Interlandi (born 1977), American journalist
- Telesio Interlandi (1894–1965), Italian journalist and propagandist
