= Laguna Art Museum =

American art museum in California

Coordinates: 33°32′37″N 117°47′18″W

Laguna Art Museum(LAM)
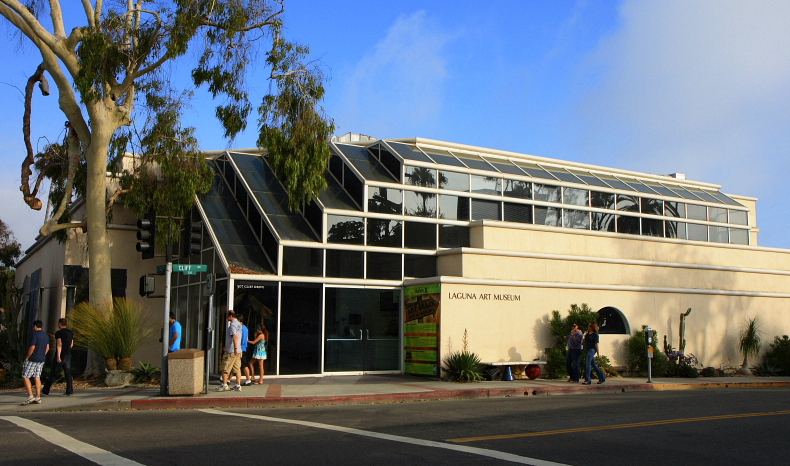
- Established: 1918 (Laguna Beach Art Association); 1972 (Laguna Beach Museum of Art); 1986 (Laguna Art Museum)
- Location: 307 Cliff Drive, Laguna Beach, California
- Type: Art museum
- Director: Julie Perlin Lee
- Website: https://lagunaartmuseum.org/

The Laguna Art Museum (LAM) is a museum located in Laguna Beach, California, on Pacific Coast Highway. LAM exclusively features California art and is the oldest cultural institution in the area. It has been known as the Laguna Beach Art Association, as well as the Laguna Beach Museum of Art.

== Overview ==
LAM is situated upon a cliff overlooking the Pacific Ocean, a scenic spot originally chosen by Laguna Beach artists in 1929. The museum collects and exhibits artwork solely created by California artists, or artwork that represents the state itself. The museum's collection ranges across all periods and styles since the nineteenth-century, maintaining a dynamic balance between the historical and the contemporary. LAM seeks to develop and circulate a permanent collection of California art while presenting it to a wider audience, and to serve the local community as a cultural and social institution.

== History ==
Founded in 1918 by a small group of artists who settled in Laguna Beach, the Laguna Beach Art Association eventually developed into an exhibition space where the best current works were showcased. Using funds raised by artists, Edgar Payne - who later became the museum's first president in 1920 - converted an old town pavilion into an art gallery to exhibit members’ artwork for sale. With fundraising largely attributed to the efforts of the artist Anna Hills, members opened a fireproof, custom-built gallery designed by the noted Los Angeles architect Myron Hunt in 1929. Meanwhile, the LBAA had begun offering art classes for both children and adults.

In 1948, a gift from the artist Frank Cuprien's estate served as the catalyst for a fundraising campaign aimed at enlarging the gallery space. Shortly after, the original building doubled in size and this new expansion opened in 1951 with an exhibition organized by Mrs. William Daniell. The selection of paintings included in this exhibition by early Laguna Beach artists later became the museum's Permanent Memorial Collection.

By growing the size of the permanent collections and increasing the quality of exhibitions, LBAA gradually began to operate as an established museum. Following these developments, it became known as the Laguna Beach Museum of Art in 1972. In April 1985, the museum was temporarily closed for reconstruction, reopening in September 1986 after an extensive $1.6 million expansion. The museum doubled in size from 9,000 square feet to 19,000 square feet, and it also increased the size storage and office areas. Along with the introduction of an entirely new building, the museum also changed its name to Laguna Art Museum. This substantial rebranding was a continuation of the museum's effort to set itself apart from other museums in the area as the premier institution of California art.

In 2016, the Laguna Beach City Council approved a matching grant program to issue $1 million to Laguna Art Museum over next four years. After this unanimous vote, the city of Laguna Beach became an arts supporter. The investment was described in the Laguna Beach Indy as testifying to the museum's importance to the city as a source of cultural enrichment and economic impact.

To commemorate the establishment of the Laguna Beach Art Association in 1918, LAM celebrated their centennial in 2018 with a year-long slew of birthday events as well as an exclusive documentary film, “Laguna Art Museum at 100" by Dale Schierholt, specially screened on April 19, and an exhibition on the museum's founders, on view from June 24 to Jan. 13. The kick-off event on Jan. 27, the Centennial Bash, included site-specific, immersive an art installations from artists Megan Geckler, Elizabeth Turk, and FriendsWithYou, live music and craft beer. On August 25, the official 100th birthday of the LBAA, the museum offered a family-friendly event with art activities, tours, prizes, cake, and free admission to the public. On the Festival of Arts grounds, the Centennial Ball, an exclusive black-tie affair, rounded out the centennial festivities and the summer activities with dinner, dancing and entertainment on Sept. 29.

== Collections ==
The museum's permanent collection, which consist of more than 3,500 artworks in various forms from the early 19th century to the present day, focuses only on California art. Significant examples from all periods of California art are represented.

Collections from the 19th and early 20th centuries include artists such as William A. Coulter, Frank Cuprien, Edwin Deakin, Ferdinand Deppe, Thomas Hill, Anna Althea Hills, Thomas Lorraine Hunt, George Hurrell, Joseph Kleitsch, Edgar Payne, Julian Rix, and William Wendt.

Contemporary artists include: John Altoon, Robert Arneson, Judy Chicago, Francis De Erdely, Tony DeLap, Manny Farber, Oskar Fischinger, Llyn Foulkes, Sam Francis, George Herms, Craig Kauffman, Peter Krasnow, Roger Kuntz, Helen Lundeberg, John McCracken, Wayne Thiebaud, and DeWain Valentine.

== Past exhibitions ==
Exhibitions at the Laguna Art Museum change every three to four months. Notable exhibitions from the past include:

- Southern California Artists, 1890 to 1940 (1979) was a major exhibition of more than 100 artists, mostly plein-air painters curated by then museum director Tom K. Enman.
- William Wendt: In Nature's Temple: The Life and Art of William Wendt (November 9, 2008 – February 8, 2009) was the first full-scale retrospective on the art of William Wendt, featuring 61 of his paintings. As a native of Laguna Beach, Wendt perfectly encapsulates California Impressionism in terms of both style and ideology. His paintings captured the sublime spirituality found in nature itself, and this exhibition provided a well-considered display of his stunning depictions of California landscapes.
- Roger Kuntz: The shadow between Representation and Abstraction (March 15 – May 24, 2009) displayed 63 paintings, 21 works on paper and 12 small bronze sculptures from all phases of Kuntz's 25-year career. It was the first major showing of the artist's work since his death. The exhibition was named one of Los Angeles Times art critic Christopher Knight's Top 10 most fascinating museum exhibitions in the nation for 2009. It offered a new look at Kuntz, who had largely fallen into obscurity following his early death in 1975 at the age of 49. Much of the exhibition focused on Kuntz's traditional oil paintings of California freeways and highway signs, which are enveloped in chiaroscuro and concerned with notions of mortality.
- WoW: Emergent Media Phenomenon (June 14 – October 4, 2009) comprised original works on paper by Blizzard Entertainment, artworks based on the culture of WoW by fourteen artists among the world, machinima and more than 145 pieces fan art. Participating artists included Chris Metzen, Sam Didier (a.k.a., Samwise), Chris Robinson, Justin Thavirat, and Roman Kenney; Aram Bartholl; Jorg Dubin; RSG; Jacqueline Goss; Auriea Harvey and Michaël Samyn, Tale of Tales; Cyril Kuhn; Antoinette LaFarge; Mashallah Design and Linda Kostowski; Robert Nideffer and Alex Szeto; Airyka Rockefeller; Anne-Marie Schleiner; Eddo Stern; The Third Faction; and Zeng Han.
- Wayne Thiebaud: American Memories (February 23 - June 1, 2014) was contained retrospective with still lifes, landscapes and cityscapes. Thiebaud handpicked the pieces himself that made up this survey of his long and esteemed career from 1959 to 2014. Vivid and colorful, Thiebaud's paintings present a charming celebration of American life which manifest in nostalgic visions from his own deeply rich memory.
- Helen Lundeberg: A Retrospective (February 21 – May 30, 2016) was the first comprehensive exhibition of artworks from the co-founder of the post-surrealism, Helen Lundeberg, since her death in 1999. It featured over 60 paintings and gave a systematic survey of Lundeberg's career from 1930s. The exhibition traces Lundeberg's career, ranging from her paintings of Post-Surrealism to geometric abstraction. Quietly enigmatic, Lundeberg's captivating artwork reveals a strong sense of order and harmony through her application of surrealistic ambiguities to architectural and landscape compositions.
- Peter Krasnow: Maverick Modernist (June 26 – September 25, 2016) premiered the first museum survey of Krasnow's artworks in nearly 40 years. Including approximately 50 paintings and 20 sculptures, the exhibition featured works acquired on loan from public and private collections throughout the US, as well as from LAM's own substantial collection. The exhibition included a diverse arrangement of his artwork, containing his early realist portraits and carved sculptures, as well as his later abstract paintings.
- Miss Hills of Laguna Beach- Anna Althea Hills: Art, Education, Community (October 16, 2016 – January 15, 2017) displayed over 60 of Hills's paintings along with china decorated by Hills, small artifacts, letters, and photographs. Hills was a founding member of the Laguna Beach Art Association, and was essential in the development of Laguna Beach's status as a leading art colony during the early twentieth century. The exhibition showcased many of her expansive depictions of Southern California landscapes and seascapes.
- Thomas Hunt: California Modernist (October 13, 2019 – January 12, 2020) comprised about fifty of Thomas Lorraine Hunt's paintings, and was the first solo exhibition of his work since shortly after his death in 1937.
- Modern Alchemy: The Fusion of Art and Nature in the Jewelry Designs of Adam Neeley (February 17, 2024 - July 29, 2024) displayed 100 of the local artist-jewelers award-winning works from the past 20 years. The retrospective displayed Neeley's proprietary gold alloy "which seamlessly changes from one color of gold into another" while exploring his creative processes and use of shapes and colors found in the natural world.
- Latest and Greatest: New Work at Laguna Art Museum (through March 2025) included seven photographs from John Humble's Sunday Afternoon series of the Port of Los Angeles.

== Programs ==
The museum offers diverse programs to serve audiences of all ages, from the local school district to the most underserved communities without access to art education. The museum provides free- of-charge School Tours which attracts more than 2,000 kindergarten-grade 12 students and teachers annually from Orange County, including cities such as Santa Ana, where the museum provides educational outreach programs. In addition, other youth-oriented activities include the monthly Family Art Studio and Elements of Art Summer Camps. The number of children attending these diverse programs increase every year as schools recognize the unique educational value.

Laguna Art Museum also provides Docent-guided Tours. What's more, there are various art education programs for adults which serves 10,000 people from around the area annually. Events include First Thursday Art Walks, music concerts presented in partnership with Laguna Beach Live!, film screenings relating to the exhibitions on view and reflecting the museum's focus on California, lectures in conjunction with exhibitions, and other mission related programs.

=== Art & Nature ===
Art & Nature is another noteworthy annual event. Laguna Beach has a long history of artists drawing their inspiration from nature, particularly the beach. This tradition is culminated in the annual Art & Nature program which was first introduced in 2013. Inspirited by the landscape, the museum hosts an annual weekend conference and festival to explore the relationship between art and nature. The multidisciplinary exploration combines art and the natural world by providing an outdoor art installation and nature-themed exhibitions along with a keynote lecture, a panel discussion with artists and environmentalists, and a free Family Festival.

The event serves a number of purposes: to provide a festival of art and ideas for the community; to inspire artists; to find and develop connections between art and science; to raise awareness of environmental issues; and to celebrate Laguna Beach as a center for the appreciation of art and nature.

- The first Art & Nature took place in 2013. The centerpiece installation of the event was Sand Drawing by Jim Denevan, a monumental pattern of spirals displayed on the Main Beach. Denevan began work on the installation at 4 a.m. Along with forty volunteers, he worked throughout the day, tracing in the sand intricate geometric designs with solar lanterns that lit up to reveal a lotus flower design and other patterns when darkness fell. In addition to Jim Denevan's piece, Art & Nature included other nature-themed exhibitions such as Adam Silverman: Clay and Space, Sea Change: Tanya Aguiniga's Bluebelt Forest, and ex•pose: Richard Kraft. These exhibitions were also supplemented with a keynote lecture by Kevin Starr, a lecture by Malcolm Warner, panel discussions, and a music concert: Surround Art & Sound by Herman Ekbote and Suman Laha.
- In 2014, Art & Nature was marked by the large-scale performance piece An Elongated Now by Lita Albuquerque. Several hundred volunteers participated in this performance work which took place on the beach at sunset. Wearing white, the performers formed an arc along the beach where they proceeded to walk to the museum and back again to the sand. Each individual performer was illuminated in the glow of a blue light, together forming a collective whole representing the connections between matter and light, sunrise and sunset, art and nature. Art & Nature also included Elizabeth Turk: Sentient Forms and Lita Albuquerque: Particle Horizon. Terry Gilford delivered the keynote lecture on John Muir, and there was also a performance titled Surf Music Presentation.
- The third annual Art & Nature program took place in 2015, with the main installation Electric Light Blanket by Laddie John Dill. This performance exhibition involved a laser performance piece on Main Beach, where choreographed light projected from the cliff became a mosaic of colors. The main installation was accompanied by two other nature-themed exhibitions, David Ligare: California Classicist and The Canyon Project: Artivism. Roger Malina delivered the keynote lecture, while Lita Albuquerque returned to take part in a talk that included An Elongated Now, a short film revolving around her exhibition from the previous year. There was also a panel discussion titled Art into Nature with the artists David Familian, Kristin Leachman, David Ligare, and Peter Matthews.
- Art & Nature 2016 included Phillip K. Smith III's large-scale installation 1/4 Mile Arc, where an arc of 250 mirrored posts were embedded in the beach and reflected the changing colors of the ocean and shoreline throughout the day. It also included three other exhibitions, Phillip K. Smith III: Bent Parallel, Miss Hills of Laguna Beach, and Kristin Leachman: Xylem Rays. Martin Kemp delivered the keynote lecture, speaking on Leonardo da Vinci's Mona Lisa and its relation to nature, while Helen Pashgian and Peter Blake took part in a panel discussion. In addition, Art & Nature 2016 also included an interactive sound performance by Jamie Stewart and David Horovitz titled ’I’, lighthouse waiting for storms. Seeking to emulate the sounds of a violent storm arriving from sea, the sound installation included an array of instruments including modular synthesizers, ice cream bells, chimes, coconuts, and glass bottles.

Annual events also included Art Auction: California Cool and Palette to Palate. Laguna Art Museum's Art Auction is one of the longest running art auctions in California and one of Orange County's most exciting art and social experiences. The art auction launched in 1983, and gradually became an important source of fundraising for education programs and exhibitions.

Palette to Palate, which started in 2006, is an annual fundraising event that combines art and dining. Once a year, guests gather for a gourmet dinner in the company of several participating artists, whose artwork is displayed on the walls and tables. Later in the evening, their artwork is placed on sale and there is also a live-auction. Money raised from this event is used to support educational outreach programs and exhibitions. Events such as Palette to Palate demonstrate the museum's rich connection to Laguna Beach's artistic community, and its greater role as a social and cultural institution.

== Funding ==
Since 1983, the Laguna Art Museum's annual California Cool Art Auction has acted as a fundraiser to support education programs and exhibits at the institution.
