= Roger Edward Kuntz =

American artist (1926–1975)

Roger Edward Kuntz (January 4, 1926 – August 22, 1975) was a highly accomplished Southern California landscape painter and a member of the Claremont Group of painters - professors and graduates of Pomona College, Scripps College, and the Claremont Graduate School. A figurative artist with an eye for abstract form, he won critical acclaim for striking compositions that transform an unusual array of subjects, including tennis players, domestic interiors, freeways, road signs, bathtubs and the Goodyear Blimp. A retrospective exhibition of his work, at the Laguna Art Museum in Laguna Beach, CA in 2009, was aptly titled "Roger Kuntz: The Shadow Between Representation and Abstraction". In the exhibition catalogue, curator Susan M. Anderson wrote: "Kuntz's work of the late 1950s and early 1960s quintessentially embodied the experimentation, fragmentation, and paradox in American culture of the time."

== Life and work ==
Roger Kuntz was born in San Antonio, Texas in 1926, the second son of Helena Grace Towle Kuntz and Clyde Antoine Kuntz, a U.S. Army pilot whose father had emigrated from the Alsace-Lorraine area of France. Soon after Roger's birth, the family moved to Honolulu, Hawaii, where Clyde Kuntz died in a plane crash in 1929. His widow took their two young sons to California, moving from San Francisco to Riverside to Coronado and, finally, to Lomaland, home of the Theosophical Society's community of artists, writers and philosophers.

Roger Kuntz began drawing and painting in his youth. After graduating from Pt. Loma High School, in 1943, he enrolled at Pomona College in Claremont, CA. He dropped out for two years to serve in the U.S. Army Air Corps and returned in 1946 to study art and psychology. Upon graduation, in 1948, Kuntz married fellow student Margaret Durr and enrolled at the Claremont Graduate School (now Claremont Graduate University). He studied with artists Henry Lee McFee, Millard Sheets, Sueo Serisawa and Carlos Lopez and earned a Master of Fine Arts degree in 1950. His classmates included painters Paul Darrow, Douglas McClellan and Karl Benjamin and sculptor Jack Zajac.

Kuntz and his wife spent four months traveling in Europe in 1950 so that Roger could visit museums and develop ideas for paintings of European scenes. The couple's only child, Mary Margaret, was born in 1951. The family lived in the Claremont area until 1963, when they moved to Laguna Beach.

Exhibition success came early to Kuntz, who won an honorable mention and cash prize at his first public showing, at the Pasadena Art Institute in 1948. By about 1950 Kuntz believed that post-war abstract expressionism had run its course and that the time was ripe for the reappearance of structure in art that communicated to the viewer. His first solo exhibition was held at the Fine Arts Gallery of San Diego in 1951. Kuntz's work got wider exposure in the early 1950s in national competitions at the Corcoran Gallery of Art in Washington DC, the Pennsylvania Academy of the Fine Arts in Philadelphia and the National Academy of Design in New York. His first international exhibition was the III Bienal de São Paulo, which opened in Brazil in 1955 and subsequently traveled throughout the United States.

In 1954, upon the recommendation of Sheets, Kuntz joined the faculty at Scripps College in Claremont as a visiting professor of art. Two years later, he received a John Simon Guggenheim Memorial Foundation grant for painting. The $3,000 award allowed him to take a leave of absence from teaching and work on his art full-time. Travels in California and Mexico inspired many of his paintings during that period. As his reputation grew, Kuntz joined the stable of artists represented by Felix Landau, a leading Los Angeles art dealer who maintained a prestigious gallery on La Cienega Boulevard. The relationship continued from 1957 to 1968.

Kuntz' paintings evolved from relatively traditional landscapes, still lifes and figure studies to much more reductive and dramatic views of freeway overpasses and underpasses, cropped highway signs, and signs carved in deep shadow and light. His most highly acclaimed body of work was produced from 1960 to 1962 in a palette generally limited to black, white, grays and greens.

Though devoid of people and cars, the distinctive images portray a stark, man-made environment designed to transport Southern California's growing population at high speeds. In 1962 and 1963, Kuntz also built a series of aluminum sculptural constructions based on traffic signals. His original interpretation of California car culture captured the attention of critics and curators who viewed the work in the context of Pop art and Kuntz was included in the first national survey of Pop Art organized by John Coplans, editor of Artforum magazine, in 1963. Kuntz had a pensive, naturalistic sensibility unlike other Pop artists, including Roy Lichtenstein and Andy Warhol.

In the last decade of his life, when he painted a series of brooding images of figures in and around bathtubs and made a group of related bronze sculptures, it was clear that Kuntz was not a Pop artist. Following his own muse, he also painted tranquil studies of a young woman seated in front of a window, fanciful images of the Goodyear Blimp tethered on a runway or landing on the Moon, and scenes of beaches and tennis courts.

In 1962 Life magazine did a special issue on the state of California; it focused on five artists: Stanton Macdonald-Wright, John McLaughlin, Robert Irwin, Billy Al Bengston, and Roger Kuntz.

In the early 1970s, Kuntz was diagnosed with skin cancer. In 1975, at 49 years of age, he died from a self-inflicted gunshot wound to the head, ending a painful period of depression and physical deterioration that had led to paralysis.

Laguna Art Museum in Laguna Beach, California, organized a major retrospective on the work of Roger Kuntz, which ran from March 8 to May 24, 2009. The exhibition, titled "The Shadow Between Representation and Abstraction," was the first major showing of the artist's work since his death. It focused on Kuntz's search for what he called the "middle ground" between figurative and non-figurative painting, and explored his role in the Southern California art scene of the 1950s and 1960s. The museum also published an exhibit catalog of the same name. "Roger Kuntz was no extremist, and that hurt his career", critic Peter Plagens wrote in the introduction to the catalogue of the artist's 2009 retrospective at the Laguna Art Museum. "In the brief time he was active as an artist in Southern California, from the mid 1950s until his suicide in 1975, the high modern art world encouraged---no, practically demanded---that an artist take sides." But Kuntz "tried to create something beautiful and significant by pursuing a middle path", Plagens wrote.

In a Los Angeles Times review of a 2012 exhibition of the "Freeway", "Sign" and "Blimp" series, at Louis Stern Fine Arts in West Hollywood, critic David Pagel wrote that Kuntz's paintings "conjure vast landscapes beyond their edges: both the endless sprawl of L.A.'s freeways and the unfathomable vastness of our interior worlds, which are filled with their own twists and turns, dead ends and exits, intersections and underpasses."

== Selected exhibitions ==
- San Gabriel Valley Artists: an Exhibition of Oils, Water Colors and Sculpture from Twenty Four Cities, Pasadena Art Institute, Pasadena, CA, 1948
- California Centennial's Exhibition of Art, Los Angeles County Museum, Los Angeles, CA 1949
- Paintings by Roger Kuntz, Fine Arts Gallery, San Diego, CA, 1951
- 147th Annual Exhibition of Painting and Sculpture, Pennsylvania Academy of the Fine Arts, Philadelphia, PA, 1952
- 127th Annual Exhibition, Paintings in Oil, Sculpture, Graphic Art, and Water Colors, National Academy of Design, New York, NY, 1952
- 58th Annual Exhibition of Western Art, Denver Art Museum, Denver, CO, 1952
- The 23rd Biennial Exhibition of Contemporary American Oil Paintings, Corcoran Gallery of Art, Washington DC, 1953
- Paintings by Southern California Artists, San Francisco Museum of Art, San Francisco, CA, 1954
- Recent Paintings by Roger Kuntz, Felix Landau Gallery, Los Angeles, CA 1955
- III Bienal de Sao Paulo, Museu de Arte Moderna, São Paulo, Brazil, 1955
- The Pittsburgh International Exhibition of Contemporary Paintings, Carnegie Institute, Pittsburgh, PA, 1955
- Freeway Paintings, Constructions, Pasadena Art Museum, Pasadena, CA, 1963
- Pop Art USA, Oakland Museum, Oakland, CA, 1963
- Landscape in Recent American Painting, New School for Social Research, New York, NY, 1963
- Roger Kuntz, Laguna Beach Art Association, Laguna Beach, CA 1965
- Kuntz, Challis Galleries, Laguna Beach, CA 1971
- Kuntz: A Retrospective Exhibition, Laguna Beach, CA, 1977
- Roger Kuntz 1926-1975: Freeway Series Drawings and Paintings, Laguna Beach School of Art, Laguna Beach, CA, 1984
- Roger Kuntz: Bathtub Series, Irvine Fine Arts Center, Irvine, CA, 1986
- Made in California: Art, Image, and Identity, Los Angeles County Museum of Art, Los Angeles, CA, 2001
- Cities of Promise: Imaging Urban California, Orange County Museum of Art, Newport Beach, CA, 2004
- Roger Kuntz: The Shadow Between Representation and Abstraction, Laguna Art Museum, Laguna Beach, CA 2009
- Roger Kuntz: Signs of LA, Louis Stern Fine Arts, West Hollywood, CA, 2011

== Selected public collections ==
- Steven Stern Fine Arts, Beverly Hills, CA
- Bowers Museum, Santa Ana, CA
- Laguna Art Museum, Laguna Beach, CA
- Long Beach Museum of Art, Long Beach, CA
- Orange County Museum of Art, Newport Beach, CA
- Scripps College, Claremont, CA
