= Peter Krasnow =

American painter

- Born: Feivish Reisberg; August 20, 1886; Novohrad-Volynskyi, Ukraine
- Died: October 30, 1979 (aged 93); Los Angeles, California
- Occupation: Artist
- Spouse: Rose Bloom

Peter Krasnow (20 August 1886 – 30 October 1979), born Feivish Reisberg, was a modernist and colorist artist known for his abstract wood sculptures and architectonic hard-edge paintings and drawings which were often based on Hebrew calligraphy and other subjects related to his Jewish heritage. Krasnow lived in Los Angeles for most of his life.

== Early life and education ==
Born in 1886 in Novohrad-Volynskyi, Russian Empire, he was an apprentice to his father, who was an interior decorator. Krasnow emigrated to the United States in 1907 and graduated from the Art Institute of Chicago in 1916.

== Career ==
Krasnow first exhibited in the 1920s. He settled in the Atwater Village neighborhood of Los Angeles in 1922, purchasing the land where he built his home and studio from Edward Weston, who was his friend and a fellow member of the early Los Angeles avant-garde. Krasnow lived there for over 50 years. His work was included in the exhibit that launched MOCA. He received a National Endowment for the Arts fellowship in 1977.

== Death ==
Kransnow died on 30 October 1979 at 93.

== Exhibitions ==
- 1922, Whitney Studio Club, New York (solo)
- 1922, Los Angeles County Museum of Art, Los Angeles
- 1923, MacDowell Club, Los Angeles (solo)
- 1926, The Print Rooms, Los Angeles
- 1927, Los Angeles County Museum of Art, Los Angeles
- 1927, Temple Emanu-El, San Francisco
- 1928, Oakland Municipal Art Gallery, Oakland (solo)
- 1928, Seattle Society of Fine Arts, Seattle (solo)
- 1928, Dalzell Hatfield Gallery, Los Angeles (solo)
- 1928, Zeitlin Bookstore, Los Angeles (solo)
- 1929, Scripps College, Claremont (solo)
- 1930, Stendahl Galleries, Los Angeles (solo)
- 1931, California Palace of Legion of Honor, San Francisco (solo)
- 1934, Galerie Pierre, Paris (solo)
- 1935, UCLA, Los Angeles
- 1935, The Print Rooms, Los Angeles
- 1935, California Pacific International Expo, San Diego
- 1939, Fine Arts Gallery, San Diego
- 1940, Stendahl Galleries, Los Angeles (solo)
- 1940, UCLA, Los Angeles
- 1954, Pasadena Art Institute, Pasadena
- 1964, Scripps College, Claremont (solo)
- 1975, Los Angeles Municipal Art Gallery, Los Angeles
- 1976, San Francisco Museum of Art, San Francisco
- 1977, Judah L. Magnes Museum, Berkeley
- 1978, Skirball Museum, Hebrew Union College, Los Angeles
- 1986, 1989, 1991, and 1993, Tobey C. Moss Gallery, Los Angeles
- 2023, Skirball Cultural Center, Los Angeles

== Artistic legacy ==
In 2000, the Laguna Art Museum acquired over 500 pieces of his work. The Skirball Cultural Center in Los Angeles also has an extensive collection of Krasnow's work and in 2023 mounted the exhibition, Peter Krasnow: Breathing Joy and Light, which focused on the artist's post–World War II paintings.
