= WoW: Emergent Media Phenomenon =

Art exhibition about online gaming

WoW: Emergent Media Phenomenon was an art exhibition based on the online fantasy game World of Warcraft and the popular culture of internet role-playing games. The collection comprised works by artists within the game-culture movement, artwork by Blizzard Entertainment (the developer of World of Warcraft), fan art and machinima. Among the participating artists were game designer Chris Metzen, Aram Bartholl, Mez Breeze as part of the Third Faction Collective, Jorg Dubin, UC Irvine professor Antoinette LaFarge, Eddo Stern; Tale of Tales developers Auriea Harvey and Michaël Samyn, The T-Shirt Issue - [Murat Koçyigit, Hande Akcayli, Linda Kostowski] and Chinese photographer Zeng Han.

The exhibition was on display at Laguna Art Museum in Laguna Beach, California from 14 June to 4 October 2009.
