= Elsie Palmer Payne =

American artist

- Born: Elsie Philippa Palmer; September 9, 1884; San Antonio, Texas
- Died: June 17, 1971 (aged 86); Minneapolis, Minnesota
- Known for: Painter
- Spouse: Edgar Payne

Elsie Palmer Payne (1884 – 1971) was an American painter known for her landscape and genre painting.

Payne was born in San Antonio, Texas on September 9, 1884. She attended Best Art School in San Francisco. In 1912 she married fellow artist Edgar Alwin Payne, with whom she had one child, Evelyn, born in 1914. The couple resided in Chicago for several years and, at that time, Payne assisted her husband in creating several murals. The couple relocated to California in 1918. They both were founding members of the Laguna Beach Art Association.

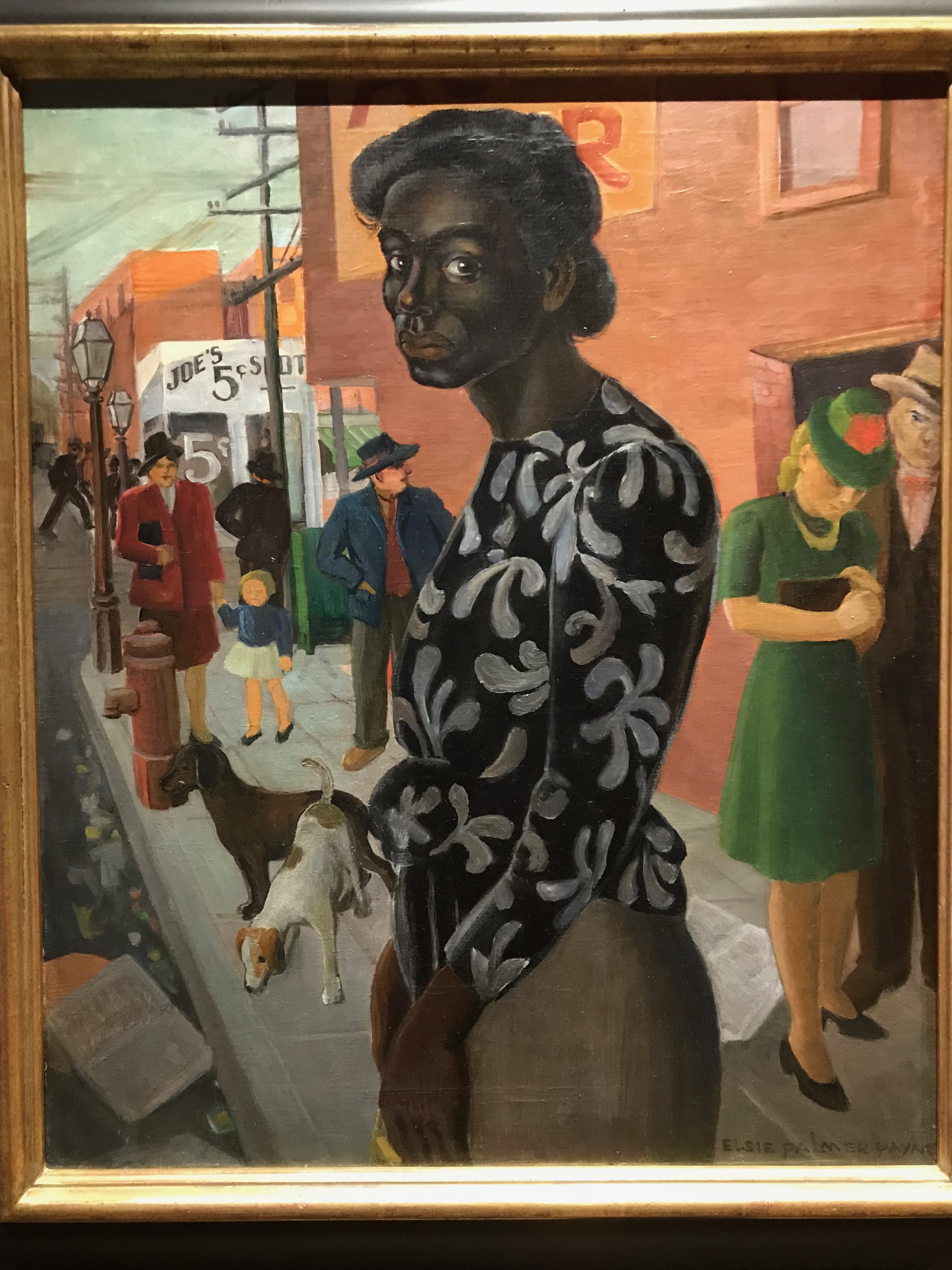
Bus Stop circa 1943 by Elsie Palmer Payne.

The family led a peripatetic life, visiting Europe several times and living for a time in New York. The couple separated in 1932. Payne settled in Los Angeles. There she taught art and continued her painting. Payne exhibited regularly, including at the Palette and Chisel Club, the Laguna Beach Art Association, the Los Angeles County Museum of Art, and the Pasadena Art Institute.

She reunited with her husband in 1946 and she took care of him until his death from cancer in 1947.

Payne died in Minneapolis, Minnesota on June 17, 1971.

Her work is in the Laguna Art Museum and the Minneapolis Institute of Art.

In 1988 the Carnegie Art Museum held a retrospective of her work entitled Elsie Palmer Payne; Out of the Shadow.
