= Schaad =

Schaad is a surname. Notable people with the surname include:

- Andreas Schaad (born 1965), Swiss Nordic combined skier
- Anni Schaad (1911–1988), German businesswoman and jewellery designer
- Bentley Schaad (1925–1999), American art educator
- Roman Schaad (born 1993), Swiss cross-country skier
- Rudolf Schaad (1901–1990), Russian-born German film editor
