= Sueo Serisawa =

American painter (1910–2004)

Sueo Serisawa (Japanese: 芹沢 末雄, April 10, 1910 – September 7, 2004) was a Japanese American who became a modernist of the Los Angeles school.

== Theme/style ==
Portrait of Judy Garland by Sueo Serisawa circa 1940 from the VonOhsen Ireland collection 2014

Serisawa's painting genres included Impressionism, Modernism, Regionalism, Expressionism, and Abstraction. He also produced still lifes and portraits. The portrait of Judy Garland is a typical example of the approach of Serisawa's portrait style that evolved during the late 1930s/1940s. His use of colour, light and texture gave an ethereal and quiet quality to his works. Serisawa's style was influenced by European Impressionists such as Renoir, Monet and Degas whose works he admired and studied extensively. Serisawa also was influenced by earlier European masters, including EI Greco, Rembrandt and Velasquez, and these various artistic influences resulted in what became for him a blending of the California Landscape School with Impressionism and his move from almost exclusively landscapes to portraits. The portrait of Garland was one of the last he did before he was forced to leave the West Coast due to the start of WWII.

== Media ==
He worked in oils and watercolors, also making lithographs.

== Biography ==
Serisawa was born in Yokohama, Japan on April 10, 1910, the son of artist Yoichi Serisawa. The family emigrated from Japan to Seattle and then to Los Angeles in 1918 where his father continued his artistic career. The young Serisawa, inspired by his father, became involved in the California Art scene perfecting his style within American Impressionism.

== Early career ==
During his time in California he taught and painted portraits of many Hollywood personalities, including Judy Garland in 1940 as well as still lifes and landscapes. He continued to exhibit, winning many substantial awards, and his increasing international reputation led to private classes for such Hollywood notables as Edward G. Robinson, Claire Trevor and Frances Marion.

His first major museum exhibition featuring portraits, still lifes and landscapes was held, ironically, on the day Pearl Harbor was attacked (December 7, 1941), at the Los Angeles County Museum. Sueo Serisawa became known as one of the leading figures in the Los Angeles-based school of Modernism. Associated with the likes of Bentley Schaad, Richard Haines, Millard Sheets, and Francis De Erdely, Sueo Serisawa helped position the West Coast as a fertile and revolutionary art center. An ambitious and talented artist, Serisawa exhibited in national shows and eventually won international recognition and his works are highly sought after.

After the bombing of Pearl Harbor and the U.S. entry into the war, Serisawa, as a Japanese immigrant, became fearful of forced internment on the West Coast. He and his family moved first to Chicago and then to New York City until 1947 when they were able to safely return to Los Angeles. Serisawa studied at Otis Art Institute and the School of the Art Institute of Chicago. He became a painting instructor himself, teaching at Kann Art Institute, Scripps College, and the Laguna Beach School of Art. Serisawa spent the rest of his life in California, teaching and painting right up until his death at age 94 in 2004. He is survived by a daughter, a grandson and great grandchildren.

Serisawa has influenced artists internationally and his work continues to be exhibited. In 2006 it was featured in "California Modernism: The Legacy of Five Exceptional Artists: Mabel Alvarez, Edward Biberman, Boris Deutsch, Francis de Erdely, and Sueo Serisawa" at the Spencer Jon Helfen Fine Arts gallery in Beverly Hills.

=== Artistic Focus ===
Serisawa's early works were romantic: still lifes and portraits painted in a style influenced by classic European art. His work up to 1941 had a decidedly Modernist, even Regionalist flair. But history – both personal and political – intervened, as Serisawa later returned to his Asian roots and began painting in an abstract style influenced by the teachings of Zen philosophy, Oriental culture, and the structure and form offered in his study of calligraphy.

== Career highlights ==
- Born in Japan, moved to Seattle in 1918 to join his father, painter Yoichi Serisawa, and began painting at age 8 with his father's guidance.
- Serisawa later studied art under George Barker, as well as at the Otis Art Institute and the Art Institute of Chicago.
- 1940 - invited to paint a portrait of MGM star Judy Garland.
- On the day that his one-man show opened at the Los Angeles County Museum of Art, America was plunged into war; the date was December 7, 1941.
- The subsequent internment of Japanese Americans sent the Serisawa family to New York City, to avoid confinement. As difficult as that time was, Serisawa later said that his time in New York was a significant influence on his development as an artist.
- Later in his career, Serisawa taught art at Scripps College, the Laguna Beach School of Art and the Palm Springs Museum of Art.
- Serisawa's works are included in the collections of the Metropolitan Museum of Art and the Smithsonian Institution.
