= Adam Neeley =

American jewelry designer

Adam Neeley is an American jewelry designer, goldsmith, and gemologist specializing in precious metals, particularly the development of gold alloys. Neeley's work has been acquired by collectors and museums including the Smithsonian Institution.

== Early life and education ==
Neeley was raised in Colorado and showed an interest in gemology and jewelry making by rock hounding in the Rocky Mountains. By the age of twelve, he was cutting gemstones and crafting silver jewelry.

Neeley won a scholarship to the Gemological Institute of America (GIA) and earned a Graduate Gemologist diploma in 2003. In 2004, he studied at Le Arti Orafe, a goldsmithing school in Florence, Italy. After graduation, he studied platinum smithing and jewelry design in New York City.

== Professional career ==
In 2006, Neeley opened an atelier in Laguna Beach, California and began participating in local art shows and festivals.

Adam Neeley's pendant, South Sea Glow, added to the Smithsonian National Gem and Mineral Collection in 2010.

After opening his business, Neeley began to experiment with alloys and, in 2010, created his first proprietary gold alloy called SpectraGold. His first jewelry piece to use this metal process, called South Sea Glow, was acquired by the Smithsonian National Gem and Mineral Collection.

In 2024, the Laguna Art Museum showed more than 100 of Neeley's past pieces in an exhibition called Modern Alchemy: The Fusion of Art and Nature in the Jewelry Designs of Adam Neeley.

In 2026, Neeley created his first jewelry collection to use titanium, called Dalí’s Garden, inspired by Surrealism and Salvador Dalí.

Neeley's metallurgical experimentation created alloys that transition colors of gold across a single piece of metal. His processes are not published but the technical process does not allow the jewelry to be molded; it must be created in a block by hand and then forged into the shape of the jewelry.

== Awards and recognition ==
Neeley has received industry awards from the American Gem Traders Association and the Manufacturing Jewelers & Suppliers of America and design awards such as the Saul Bell Design Award.

His work has been reported on in industry publications and news outlets including Rapaport Magazine., JCK Online, The Robb Report, The Los Angeles Times, Elle Decor, Veranda, Galerie, and The New York Times

Neeley’s work can be found in the Smithsonian Institution’s Museum of Natural History and has been exhibited at institutions such as the GIA Museum in Carlsbad, the Alfie Norville Gem & Mineral Museum in Tucson, and the Headley-Whitney Museum in Lexington, Kentucky.
