= Donald Henry Floyd =

English painter (1892–1965)

- Born: 18 April 1892; Plymouth, Devon, England
- Died: 15 June 1965 (aged 73); Monmouthshire, Wales
- Spouse: Annie
- Children: Roger

Donald Henry Floyd (18 April 1892 – 15 June 1965) was a British painter known for his work in South East Wales.

== Biography ==
Floyd was born in Plymouth. He trained under Frederick John Snell and John Noble Barlow for five years with such success that he was exhibiting at the Walker Art Gallery when he was 21. Snell, who was the Art Master at Blundell's School, taught him water colours, whilst Barlow introduced him to the painting of the St Ives School. He trained to be a teacher but the First World War interfered with his plans. Floyd insisted on remaining a private whilst he served in Palestine, Egypt and India where he was tasked to sketch enemy positions, but he still painted in his free time.

After the war he married Annie (a teacher who had trained under Maria Montessori) who was also a teacher and they moved to the South Wales border area around Caldicot, Chepstow and finally Tintern. Annie gave birth to a son called Roger in 1927. When Sri Lanka gained its independence in 1948 he was able to gain a commission to record that event for posterity, which he did with over sixty paintings. This was despite having to learn to use his left arm after losing the use of his right arm due to illness.

Floyd had 16 paintings exhibited at the Royal Academy as well as regular exhibits in the Royal Birmingham Society of Artists and the Royal West of England Academy exhibitions. His subjects included his travels to Ireland, England and Holland but he was known for the paintings around Monmouthshire including 250 of the Wye Valley, which he painted in all weathers. His family would sit warm inside whilst Floyd would don an extra overcoat to capture an image before it changed.

Floyd died on 15 June 1965. He has paintings in Chepstow Museum, Monmouth Museum, Newport Museum and the National Library of Wales.
