= Kristin Leachman =

American contemporary artist

Kristin Leachman is an American contemporary artist living and working in Los Angeles, California, United States. Born in Washington, D.C., Leachman spent her early years in rural Virginia.

Leachman studied at the Rhode Island School of Design, where she received her BFA in Painting. She went on to study at The American Film Institute in Hollywood, receiving her MFA in Production Design and being awarded the Franklin J. Schaffner Fellowship. Leachman designed "Senzeni Na?" (“What Have We Done?”), nominated for the “Best Short Subject” Academy Award. After several years of working on studio productions in Hollywood, Leachman returned to painting.

Leachman's work is widely represented in museums and private collections including, among others, the San Diego Museum of Art and The National Museum of Women in the Arts. Her work was recently acquired by the U.S. Department of State for the U.S. Embassy in Kabul, Afghanistan. An interview with Leachman is included in the Smithsonian's Archives of American Art Oral History Program.

The Los Angeles Times art critic Christopher Knight wrote, "Leachman intensifies a sense of intimacy that is at once sensual and contemplative, stitching together the body and mind in ways our culture usually keeps split. … Like the universe glimpsed in a grain of sand, her work plays with scale in marvelous ways."

From late 2016 until early 2017, Leachman had a solo exhibition of her work, entitled 'Xylem Rays', displayed in the Laguna Art Museum in California.
