= David Ligare =

American painter

- Born: 1945 (age 80–81); Oak Park, Illinois, United States
- Known for: Painting, drawing
- Style: Classicism, realism
- Partner: Gary Smith
- Website: David Ligare

David Ligare (born 1945) is a California-based representational painter of landscape, figurative and still life works. His paintings employ formal principles and ideas from Greco-Roman art and Classical history painting in the service of philosophical contemplations of contemporary existence. He has sometimes been characterized as a photorealist, however, many critics reject that categorization. They identify an uncanny, timeless element in his work focused on moral concerns, the past and idealized subjects rather than the reproduction of photographic reality, which belies the photorealist label. Critic Donald Kuspit termed Ligare's paintings "covertly abstract as well as overtly realistic, and thus peculiarly surreal. Formally beautiful as well as insightfully true to appearances, and responsible to the cultural heritage of Classical antiquity, they fuse modernism and traditionalism."

David Ligare, Penelope, oil on canvas, 40" x 48", 1980. Collection: The Crocker Art Museum, Sacramento, CA.

Ligare's work belongs to the public collections of institutions including the Museum of Modern Art, de Young Museum, San Jose Museum of Art, and Smithsonian American Art Museum. He has appeared in surveys at the San Francisco Museum of Modern Art (SFMOMA), Aldrich Museum of Contemporary Art, National Museum in Gdansk (Poland) and National Pinakothiki (Athens, Greece), and had solo exhibitions at the Crocker Art Museum, Georgia Museum of Art, Monterey Museum of Art and Laguna Art Museum, among other venues.

He has lived in the Monterey region of California since the late 1960s and is based in the Carmel Valley.

== Life and career ==
Ligare was born in 1945 in Oak Park, Illinois and moved with his family to Manhattan Beach, California at age five. He painted from an early age; a backpacking trip through Europe after high school sparked his interested in classical art. Ligare began studies at the Art Center College of Design in 1964, but left the following year to paint plein air landscapes, despite the prevailing influences of Pop art and Abstract Expressionism.

In 1965, he was drafted into the U.S. army and eventually worked as an illustrator for United Armed Forces Television at Fort Monmouth in New Jersey. While there, he began exhibiting at New York venues such as ACA Galleries. In 1968 after his military service, Ligare moved to Big Sur on the California coast. In 1974 he met his partner, Gary Smith, who accepted a position teaching art at Hartnell College in Salinas; they eventually settled in Corral de Tierra, the area of Monterey County that John Steinbeck called "The Pastures of Heaven." Over the next two decades, Ligare had solo exhibitions at the Phoenix Art Museum, Prince of Wales Institute of Architecture, Frye Art Museum, Koplin Gallery (Los Angeles), and Schoelkopf Gallery and Stiebel Modern in New York, among others. He appeared in classicist-oriented and realist surveys at the Denver Art Museum, deCordova Museum, Long Beach Museum of Art and SFMOMA.

In the 2000s, Ligare had solo exhibitions at the Fresno Art Museum, Monterey Museum of Art, Crocker Art Museum (an 80-work retrospective), Georgia Museum of Art, and galleries including Koplin Del Rio (Los Angeles), Hackett-Freedman (San Francisco), Plus One (London), LewAllen Galleries (Santa Fe) and Hirschl & Adler Modern (New York). He exhibited in surveys at the Orange County Museum of Art, San Jose Museum of Art, National Museum Gdansk (Poland) and McNay Art Museum, among others.

== Work and reception ==
Ligare's work arose in response to 1970s conceptualism and the dominant modernist emphasis on originality, self-expression and irony, instead privileging a then-unfashionable connection to the past. Since the late 1970s, he has sought to revive a sensibility in contemporary art informed by classical formal ideas, a desire for knowledge, and aspirational humanist ideas such as social responsibility and harmonious integration of diversity. His creative process seeks a balance between structure (Apollonian order) and randomness of appearances (Dionysian chaos); together those elements convey his third area of focus: content rooted in narrative, allegory and timeless principles.

Ligare's imagery celebrates idealized forms—of nature and the human figure—and their harmonic relationships, while considering contemporary moral questions through the lenses of antiquity and Stoic philosophy. Critics suggest that his unblemished subjects and surfaces (intended to erase his own presence) disguise deep-seated tensions in the work between introspection and pleasure, aesthetic distance and erotic interest, classicism and modernism. Ligare often sets his reworkings of traditional stories and morals within the rocky landscape, hills, trees and skies of his native Monterey region, melding the ancient Mediterranean with modern notions of California as an American Arcadia.

His wide-ranging influences include the aesthetic and philosophical theories of the Greek sculptor Polykleitos, the philosopher Pythagoras, the art and architecture of the Florentine Quattrocento artists Filippo Brunelleschi and Leon Battista Alberti, and work of French classicists and neoclassicists such as Nicolas Poussin, Claude Lorrain and Jacques-Louis David. Some writers have related Ligare's tactical adaptation of traditional realist genres to the more critically recognized photography of Jeff Wall—who also reworked historical pictorial traditions—and to the postmodernist paintings of Gerhard Richter and Chuck Close, despite clear differences among them.

=== Early series ===
Ligare's early 1970s work showed an affinity for environmental and process art, isolating aspects of the landscape to express universal concepts. His realistic "Sand Drawings" series (1971–1977) transposed blurred markings and abstract patterns he originally drew in wet sand and then meticulously rendered onto paper, creating the illusion of two-dimensional earthworks. He followed with a series of tightly defined watercolors and oils of white cloth bunched on tables overlooking the sea (the "Delphi" series, 1972) or lying on the beach; the mounds of fabric evoked ancient marble sculptural fragments in which only torsos and drapery remained.

By 1976, this work evolved into his "Thrown Drapery" paintings, which brought him increased attention. He based them on photographs he took of white drapery tossed in the air at the seafront. The fluttering pieces of cloth captured a moment of hovering balance between ascent and descent; inspired by their airborne isolation above sea and sky, he titled them after Greek islands (e.g., Delos and Syros, 1978). While appearing as depictions of casual snapshots, the paintings were carefully composed according to each canvas's proportions and explored abstraction, realism and intentionality in response to the non-compositional strategies of conceptualists such as John Baldessari.

David Ligare, Achilles and the Body of Patroclus, oil on canvas, 60" x 78", 1986.

=== Figurative narrative painting ===
Influenced by artist-critic Sidney Tillim's championing of narrative and history painting, Ligare shifted to directly referencing classical themes in conceptual figurative works in the late 1970s. His first fully-realized work in this vein was the iconic painting Penelope (1980), a lone figure seated in calm, patient introspection by the sea. Los Angeles Times reviewer William Wilson called Ligare's first exhibition of this body of work (Koplin Gallery, 1983) one of the "most thought-provoking stylistic moves in recent memory" and deemed him "as sober as Poussin and as rigorous, in his way, as Jacques Louis-David."

Ligare's figurative narratives often featured handsome, athletic men in togas, arranged in carefully orchestrated poses and surrounded by dramatically sunlit, unspoiled nature, ruins or ancient architecture. He drew upon mythological sources such as Virgil's Aeneid and Homer's Iliad, while his strict compositional arrangements derived from Renaissance and neo-classical history paintings (e.g., Achilles and the Body of Patroclus (The Spoils of War), 1986); the work's theme—causing the inadvertent death of a lover—reflected the reality of that era's AIDS crisis. In other compositions, following Poussin, Ligare began with geometric structures related to the subject matter itself, as in Hercules Protecting the Balance between Pleasure and Virtue (1993), which used a triangular composition to portray the mythic hero choosing between figures representing virtue and pleasure.

In later paintings, Ligare often focuses on single figures, frequently idealized athletic nudes. The life-sized Arete (Black Figure on a White Horse) (2000) presents a youth seated atop a horse on the beach at sunset with a quote by the Greek poet Pindar written below; arete is a concept in Greek thought referring to excellence or the full realization of potential. Diver (2003) and Night Diver (2019) each feature a figure suspended in mid-air that is derived from an ancient Greek funerary fresco; the visual representation of movement between the two realms of air and water allude to the transition from life into death.

=== Landscape narrative painting ===
In 1988, Los Angeles Times critic Suvan Geer noted a shift in emphasis in some of Ligare's work, in which the Monterey County-Big Sur landscapes of John Steinbeck and Robinson Jeffers took center stage. In these pastoral scenes thinned of historical references, fertile rolling hills dotted with ruins and rock archways dwarfed his classic figures. Geer wrote that they "retained the timeless, perfectly ordered sense of placidity of his earlier history paintings" and encouraged philosophic rumination in the manner of Poussin's "ideal landscapes." Like Ligare's figurative paintings, these were conceptual constructions—archetypes of a mythic Arcadia invented out of multiple photographic sources and highly ordered structures serving as metaphors for balance, the commensurability of parts and responsible social interaction.

In subsequent decades, Ligare has painted many landscapes without figures. These paintings often depicted the arresting sunset light known as the "golden hour," with clouds breaking over the coastal hills, sloping valleys and rivers (e.g., Broad Landscape with a River, 1998). Ligare linked this melancholy-tinged light to truth (as in Plato's Allegory of the Cave), the illumination of ideas, the transience of beauty and mortality. David Pagel identified a streak of Romanticism in this raking light, which gave "vivid physical form to those moments of silent stillness … when we get up before sunrise and feel the unspoiled potential of the breaking day." In later landscapes, Ligare often painted elemental forms from Big Sur, as in Seascape with Rocks (2011) and Rock (2012).

David Ligare, Still Life with Grape Juice and Sandwiches (Xenia), oil on canvas, 20" x 24", 1994. Collection: de Young Museum, San Francisco.

Ligare has also produced revised classicist architectural scenes, including a Brunelleschi-like Florentine baptistry (On Perspective, 2000) and a reimagined Ponte Vecchio (Ponte Vecchio/Torre Nova, 1996). Christopher Knight suggested these paintings "use order, symmetry, mathematical precision and clarity of light to create scenes of quiet disorientation and even eccentricity."

=== Still life painting ===
Ligare took up the still life in 1987, seeking to further his empirical investigation of beauty, the structure of the visible world, and ancient laws of nature. Characterized by a "mystical simplicity," his still lifes distill concepts such as classical balance (e.g., the opposing forms of Still Life with Rock and Leaf, 1994) or symmetry and integration through perceptual analyses of objects painted in closely observed light and shadows. Art historians described them as archeological and historical in their embrace of a time-honored genre, and present-focused in their call to closely examine and revere common objects.

Ligare creates them by first capturing ideal California sunlight conditions in photographs. He frequently stages them in a small, precisely proportioned enclosure that serves as a neutral background against a Pacific Ocean backdrop. The altar-like "set" introduces a spiritual counterpart to the material, an idea manifest in his subjects—often food and drink items that recall depictions of offerings to the gods in ancient frescoes that serve as inspiration (e.g. Still Life with Peaches and a Water Jar (Aparchai), 2005). Still Life with Grape Juice and Sandwiches (Xenia) (1994) conveyed themes of hospitality and social responsibility, depicting simple offerings common to the homeless shelter in Salinas at which Ligare volunteered for many years.

== Public collections ==
Ligare's work belongs to the public collections of the Crocker Art Museum, de Young Museum, Frye Art Museum, Gabinetto Disegni e Stampe degli Uffizi (Italy), Georgia Museum of Art, McNay Art Museum, Monterey Museum of Art, Museum of Modern Art (New York), Portland Museum of Art, San Jose Museum of Art, Santa Barbara Museum of Art, Smithsonian American Art Museum, and Wadsworth Atheneum Museum of Art.
