= John Noble Barlow =

English artist

- Born: 1861; Manchester, England
- Died: 1917; Penzance, England
- Education: Jules Joseph Lefebvre, Paul Delance and Benjamin Jean – Joseph Constant
- Known for: Painting

John Noble Barlow (1861–1917) was a prominent English artist at the turn of the twentieth century, known predominantly as a landscape and seascape painter.

== Biography ==
John Barlow was born in Manchester, England in 1861. He enrolled at the Académie Julian in Paris, and studied for two years under Jules Joseph Lefebvre, Paul Louis Delance and Jean-Joseph Benjamin-Constant. Barlow also studied in Belgium, the Netherlands and New York City in the United States. He later emigrated to the United States and became a U.S. citizen in 1887, although he returned to Europe by 1889. Barlow lived in Providence, Rhode Island, was a member of the Providence Art Club and exhibited at the National Academy of Design and the Art Institute of Chicago.

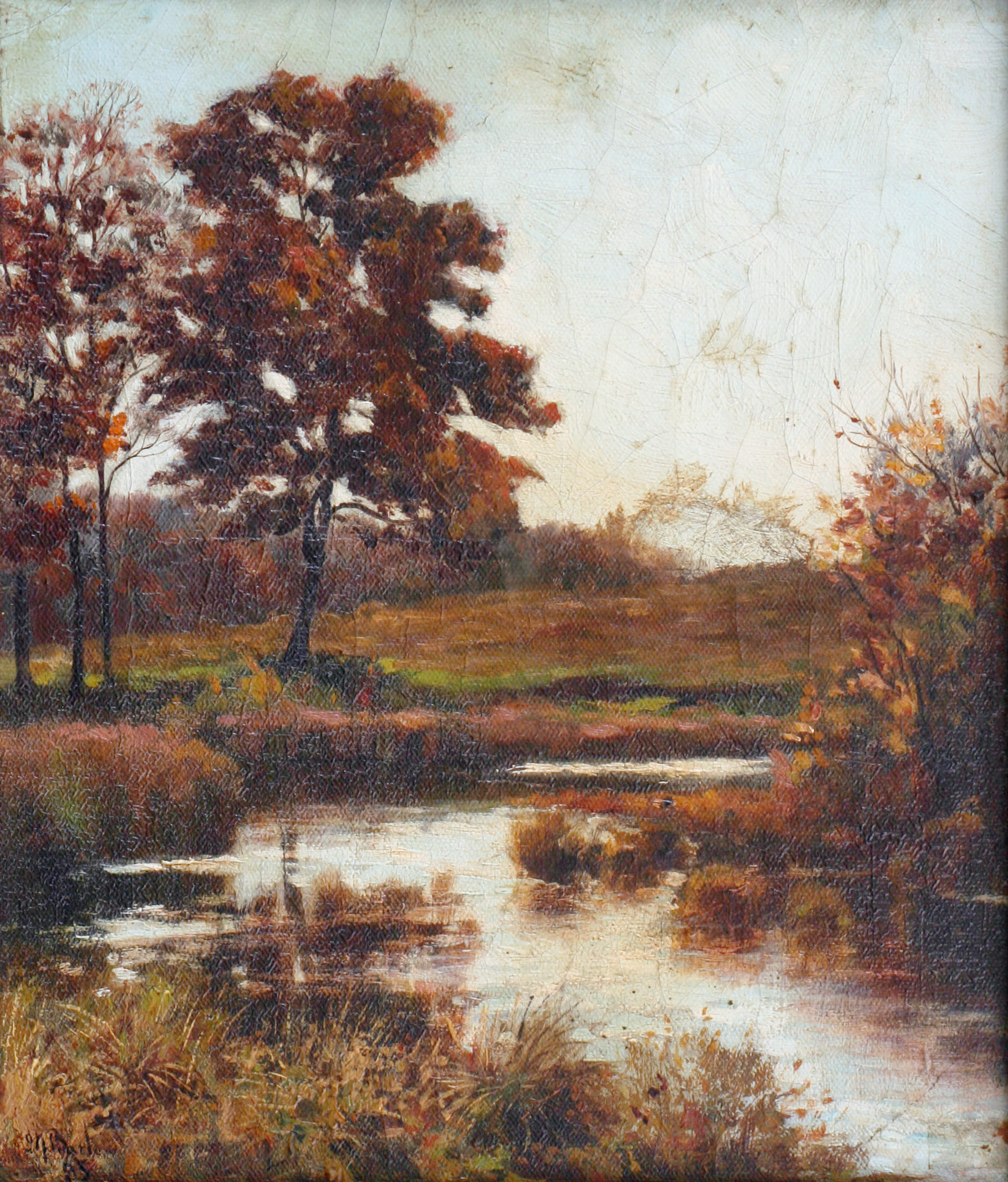
A Stream in Autumn: An 1885 landscape by John Noble Barlow (oil on canvas, 12" x 10").

Barlow returned to England, married Marie Elizabeth Johnson (an American Citizen) in London in 1891, and then settled in St. Ives, Cornwall in 1892. In 1896, Barlow was made a member of the Royal Society of British Artists (RBA) and, in 1916, the Royal Institute of Oil Painters (ROI). He received medals at both the 1899 Paris Salon (Gold Medal-3rd Class) and the 1900 Paris Exposition. Many of his later scenes are from the Lamorna Valley, Cornwall, where he had a studio. His 1909 painting, "Spring, Lamorna" was considered his best work to date.

Barlow died in Penzance, Cornwall, in 1917.

Many of Barlow's pupils at the John Noble Barlow school became well-known painters, including Garstin Cox, William Cox, Donald Henry Floyd, Herbert George, Anna A. Hills, and Edgar Nye.

== Works ==
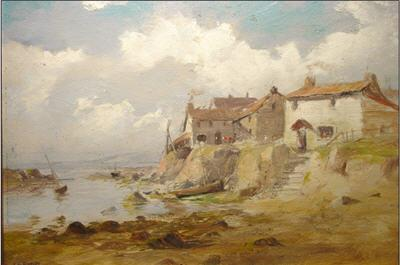
Fishing Cottages, Lamorna Valley, Penwith Peninsula, Cornwall

Barlow was well known for his large landscapes, seascapes, sunsets and moonrises and autumnal scenes. Tree groupings were considered one of his strong suits. Three of Barlow's paintings are currently displayed at the Rhode Island School of Design Museum in Providence, Rhode Island in the United States. Barlow's work is also on public display in Cheltenham, Plymouth and Truro in England. He often signed his works, "J. N. Barlow".

== See also ==
- List of St. Ives artists

== Notes and references ==
- David Tovey. Creating A Splash: The St Ives Society of Artists, (1927–1952) (Wilson Books, 2004)
- John Noble Barlow (Barlow Genealogy).
- John Noble Barlow (The Lynda Cotton Gallery).
