= Thomas Lorraine Hunt =

Canadian-American landscape painter

- Born: 11 February 1882; London, Ontario, Canada
- Died: 17 April 1938 (aged 56); Santa Ana, California, US
- Known for: Painter
- Movement: Post-Impressionism, Modernism

Thomas Lorraine Hunt (11 February 1882 – 17 April 1938) was a Canadian-American landscape painter of the 1920s and 30s, known especially for his dramatic use of color. His paintings are considered a transition from impressionism to modernism. His primary subjects were boats and harbors in which the colors and shapes on the canvas took precedence over the exactness of the objects. Hunt was active among the Southern California group of Impressionist plein air painters and a founding member of the Laguna Art Museum.

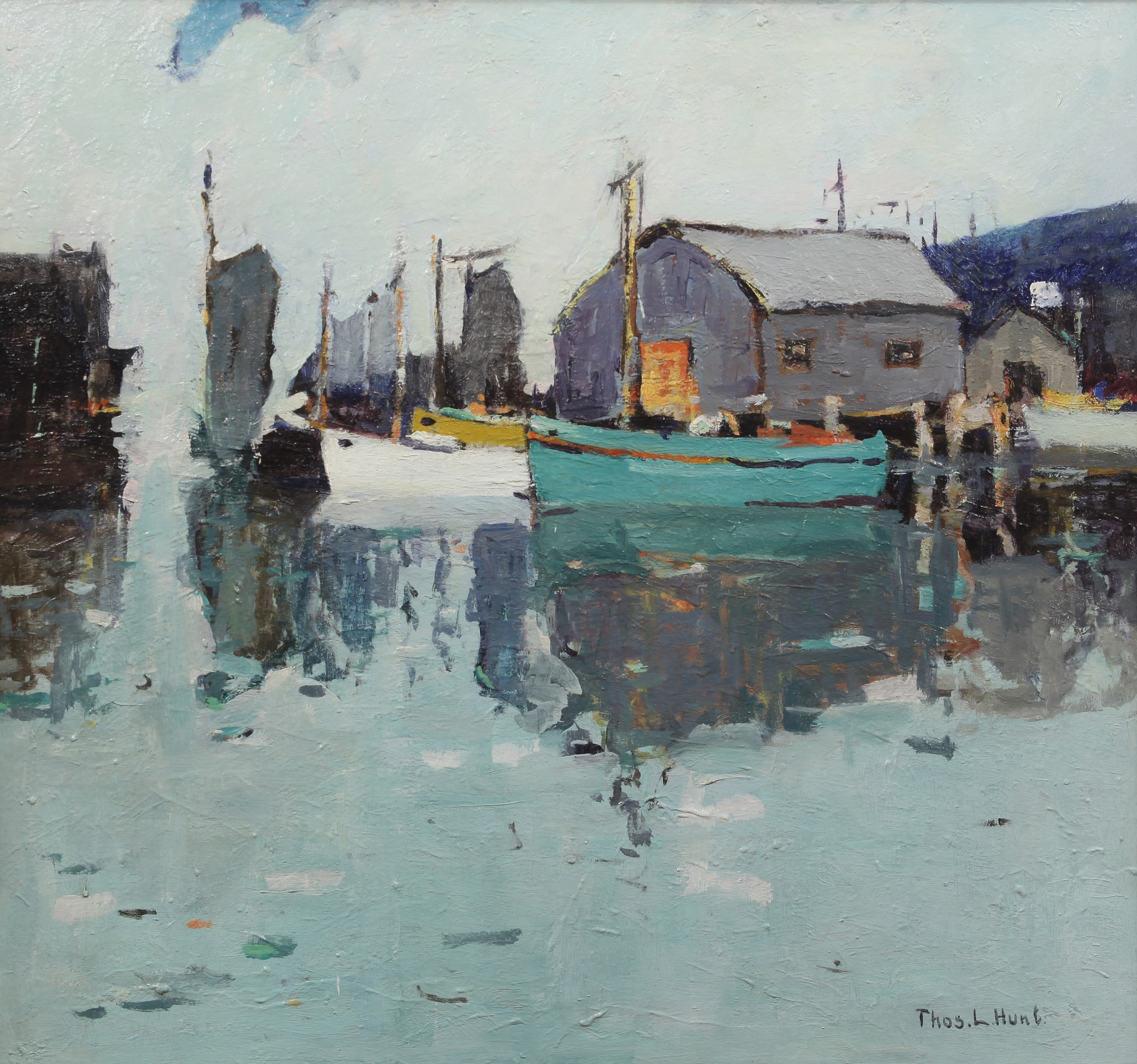
Harbor of Gloucester 28x30 inch oil on canvas, ca.1934 (permanent collection, Laguna Art Museum)

== Early life ==
Thomas Lorraine Hunt was born 11 February 1882 in London, Ontario, Canada, the son of the landscape artist William Powell Hunt. He was mentored in painting technique by his father who encouraged Hunt to pursue a career as an artist. Beginning at age 19, Hunt worked as a traveling salesman, then began taking landscape art seriously in 1908 at the age of 26. After marrying Blanche Levine in 1910, he and his wife immigrated to Cleveland, Ohio, USA. In Cleveland, Hunt earned a living in apartment construction as a general contractor and real estate developer, however, in the city directories he listed his occupation as artist.

== Career ==
Hunt began painting in earnest around the age of 40. Following a vacation trip to Southern California with his wife and parents in 1922, Hunt sold his real estate holdings in Cleveland and moved to San Bernardino, California. Hunt continued to earn a living with real estate development projects in Hollywood and San Bernardino, but became an active figure in the artist community. He began spending considerable time with the Plein Air impressionist painters in Laguna Beach. Additionally, each summer from 1922 to 1926, he and his wife traveled back east to Gloucester, Massachusetts. In Gloucester, Hunt attended the group classes given by artist and instructor Hugh Breckenridge at his Breckenridge School of Art.

Hunt's favorite subjects from both Gloucester and Southern California were landscapes of boats and harbors.

In 1926, Hunt received a commission from the Elks Club of Los Angeles for a painting that would depict the end of the war with Mexico in 1848. Hunt's large 78 x 90 inch canvas, The First American Flag, illustrated the first raising of the American flag in California. The painting exemplified Hunt's "unique approach to painting by reducing an image to a few key elements, simplifying both color and form to create an overall patterned design."

Hunt moved to Laguna Beach in 1927, having built a home therewith a studio overlooking the Pacific Ocean. He became a member of the Laguna Beach Art Association and worked on the selection committee to locate a site for the Association's permanent gallery, which became the Laguna Art Museum.

Hunt exhibited his works regularly during the late 1920s and early 1930s. His exhibition prizes included a 1st place at the 1928 California State Exhibition, 2nd in 1927 Laguna Beach Art Association (LBAA) exhibit, honorable mention from the San Diego Fine Arts Guild in 1933, 3rd at the 1933 LBAA exhibit, the 1933 Gertrude Streater Award for Landscape from the Pasadena Art Institute, and the 1933 Prize for Oil Painting from the San Diego Fine Arts Society.

== Personal life ==
Hunt married Blanche Levina Smith (born 18 May 1871, County Down, Ireland) in 1910. They had no children. In 1937, Blanche died of a cerebral hemorrhage at their Laguna Beach home. Hunt had suffered from stomach ulcers for many years, and died at Santa Ana Hospital on 17 April 1938 after surgery for a perforated ulcer. Both Thomas and Blanche Hunt were buried at Mountain View Cemetery in San Bernardino. At Hunt's memorial service, his close friend artist Frank Cuprien gave the eulogy.

== Style and legacy ==
Although his father was a noted landscape artist, and Hunt took some classes from Hugh Breckenridge, he is considered to be mostly self-taught. It has been speculated that Hunt was exposed to some avant-garde styles of art from the Cleveland School of Art.

According to art historian Jean Stern, Hunt developed a unique style that was "uncommonly modernistic for the period." Stern considered his paintings as a transition from impressionism to modernism through a "distinct and unique form of post-impressionism... characterized by bold dramatic canvasses that celebrate color." William H. Gerdts described Hunt's style as using "forms [that] are simple, colorful, unadorned and intense... his paintings celebrate color at the expense of objective exactitude."

There were no solo exhibitions of Hunt's paintings during his lifetime. Following his death, the Laguna Beach Art Association held a mini-retrospective in 1938 and again in 1959. The first major collection and exhibition of paintings by Thomas Hunt was held in the fall of 2019 at the Laguna Art Museum.
