= Earl L. Stendahl =

American art dealer (1888–1966)

- Born: December 11, 1888; Menomonie, Wisconsin, U.S.
- Died: May 18, 1966 (aged 77); Morocco
- Occupation: Art dealer
- Spouse: Enid Stendahl
- Children: 1 son, 1 daughter

Earl L. Stendahl (December 11, 1888 – May 18, 1966) was a pioneering American art dealer known for promoting California Impressionism, modern and pre-Columbian art. The gallery he founded celebrated its centennial in 2011.

== Early life ==
Stendahl was born in Menomonie, Wisconsin. His parents were confectioners.

== Career ==
Stendahl moved to the Los Angeles area, where he opened his own candy store. He opened his first gallery in Pasadena, California, in 1913. By 1921, he moved his gallery to the Ambassador Hotel in Los Angeles. He maintained a gallery on Wilshire Boulevard until 1949, where he moved it to his house on Hillside Avenue. Stendahl's son, Alfred E. Stendahl and son-in-law, Joseph Dammann, joined the family business.

By the 1930s, the gallerist had established his reputation as the premier dealer in painters of the California Impressionist School. William Wendt, Guy Rose, Edgar Payne, Joseph Kleitsch and Nicolai Fechin were part of the early Stendahl stable of artists. Stendahl introduced Modern art to the West Coast with works by Matisse, Chagall, Klee, Feitelson, Siqueiros, Cantú, Kandinsky, Braque and Picasso.

As early as 1935, Stendahl began promoting ancient artifacts from Mexico and Central America before branching out to become a significant dealer of the Pre-Columbian art of his day.

He sold Mexican and Central American antiquities that were often stolen, looted, or assembled from disparate fragments. Often sold to Hollywood collectors, to museums, and even department stores.

Stendahl's archives were recently donated to the Getty. By studying the photos and records researchers can trace the history of Pre-Hispanic artworks of ceramic and stone that passed through Stendahl's gallery.

== Personal life, death and legacy ==
With his wife Enid, Stendahl had a son, Alfred, and a daughter, Mrs Eleanor E. Damman. They resided at 7055-65 Hillside Avenue in Hollywood, California.

Stendahl died on May 18, 1966, in Morocco. His gallery archives were donated to the Smithsonian Institution's Archives of American Art in 1976. The Stendahl Gallery continues to operate, celebrating its centennial in 2011, with Earl Stendahl's grandson, Ronald W. Dammann, presiding.
