= Elanor Colburn =

American painter (1866–1939)

- Born: Eleanor Ruth Gump; 1866; Dayton, Ohio, U.S.
- Died: May 7, 1939 (aged 72–73); Laguna Beach, California, U.S.
- Burial place: Fairhaven Memorial Park, Santa Ana, California, U.S.
- Other names: Elanor Ruth Eaton Gump, Eleanor Ruth Eaton Gump Colburn
- Education: School of the Art Institute of Chicago (BFA)
- Occupation(s): Painter, watercolorist, muralist
- Spouse(s): Charles Harry Eaton (div.), Joseph Elliott Colburn (m. 1898–1915; div.)
- Children: Ruth Eaton Peabody

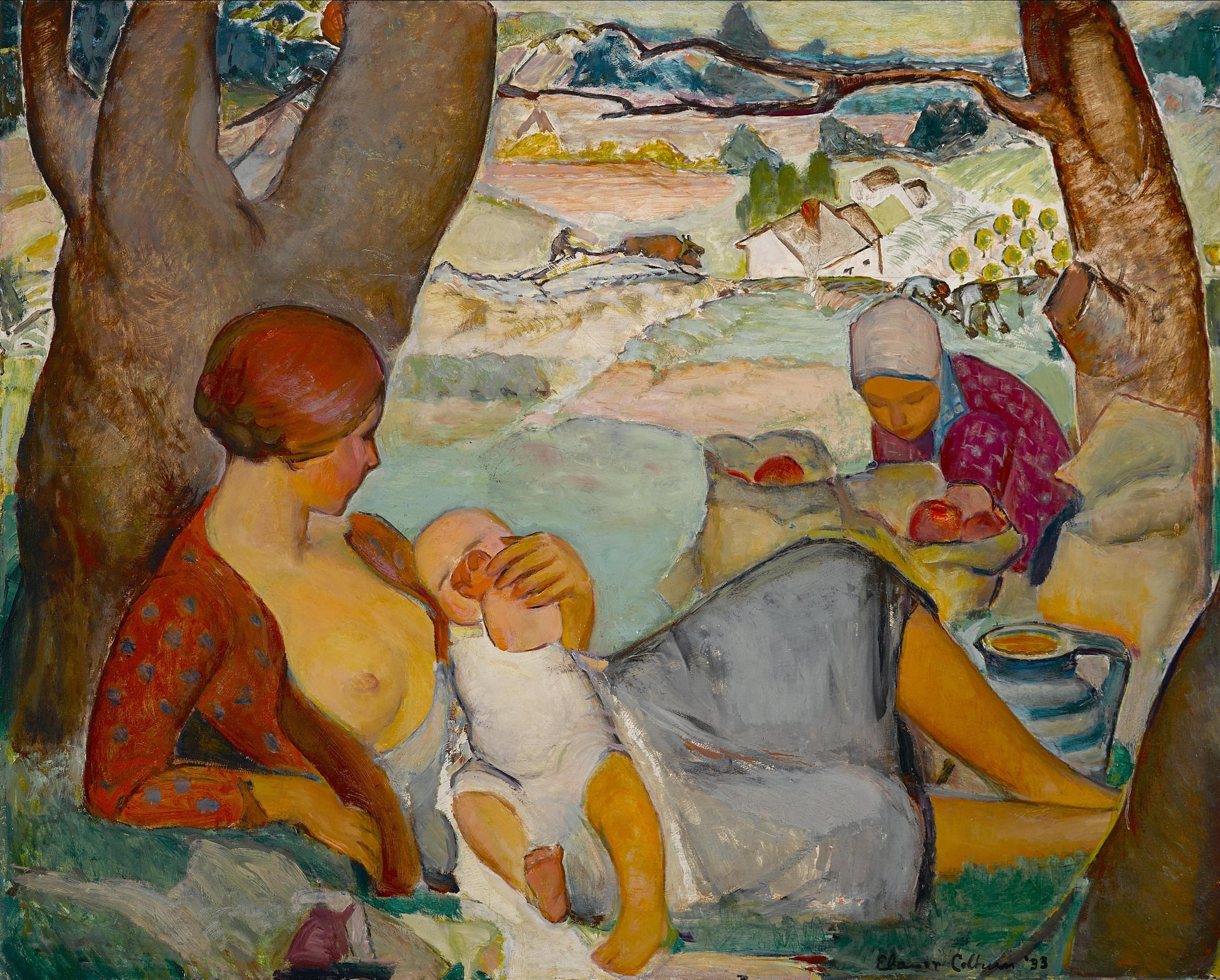
Elanor Ruth Colburn, 'New Earth' (1933)

Elanor Ruth Eaton Gump Colburn (née Eleanor Ruth Gump; 1866 – May 7, 1939), was an American painter. She was active in Chicago, and Laguna Beach, California.

== Life and career ==
Eleanor Ruth Gump was born in 1866, in Dayton, Ohio. In 1927, she changed her name to "Elanor". She attended the School of the Art Institute of Chicago, and was a student under William Merritt Chase and Frank Duveneck.

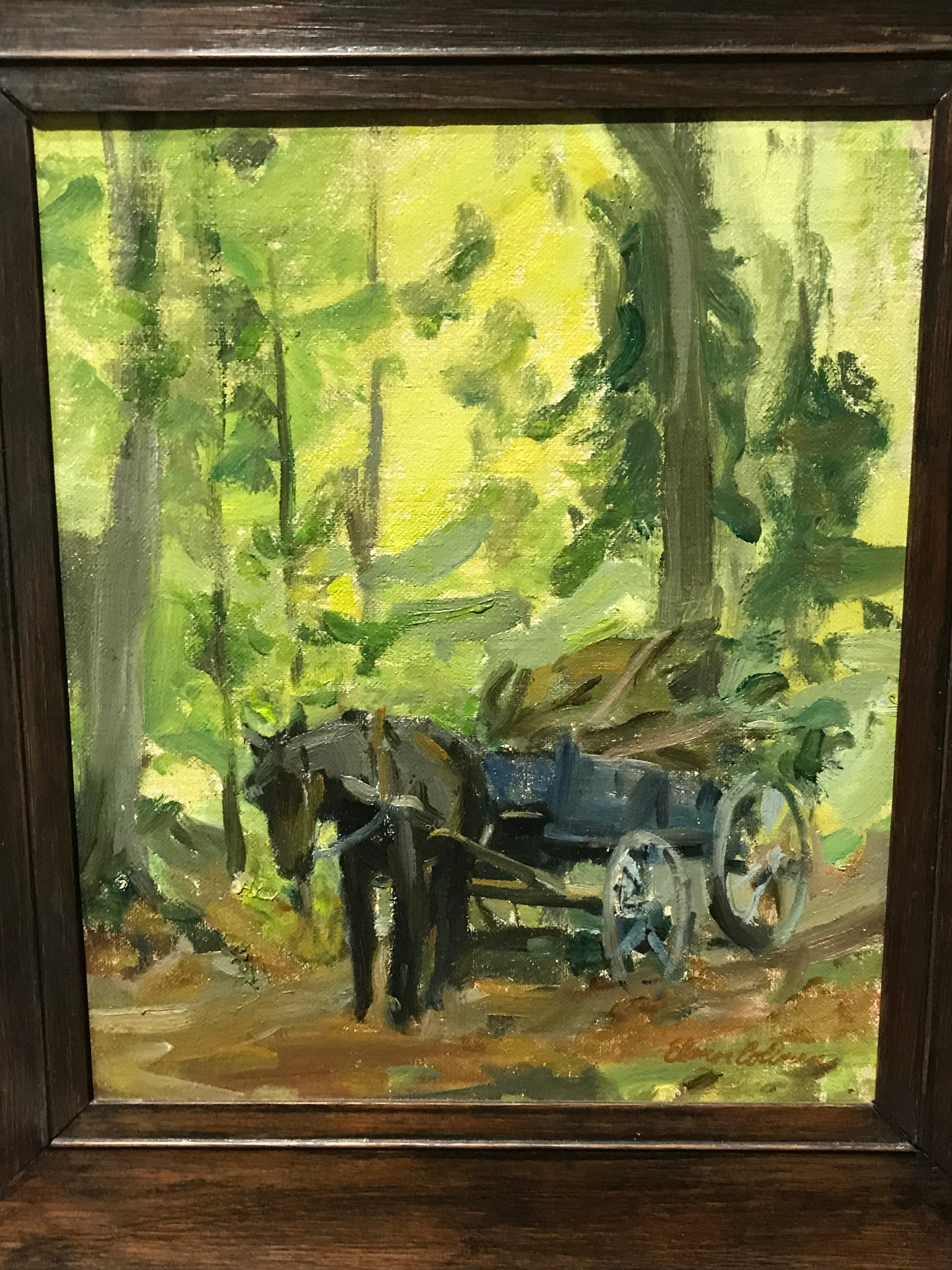
Untitled--Horse and Cart Pulling Lumber circa 1930 by Elanor Colburn.

In the 1920s she spent time at Ogunquit Art Colony in Ogunquit, Maine. Colburn's painting Fishwives, was awarded the Leisser–Farnham Prize in 1930 from the San Diego Art Guild.

Her first marriage was to Charles Harry Eaton (1850–1901), a landscape painter. Their daughter was Ruth Eaton Peabody (1893–1966), a noted painter. Her second marriage was in 1898 to Joseph Elliott Colburn, an ophthalmologist, which ended in divorce by 1915.

Around 1924, she moved with her daughter to Laguna Beach, California, where they were some of the early artists in the area.
