= Edgar Alwin Payne =

American painter

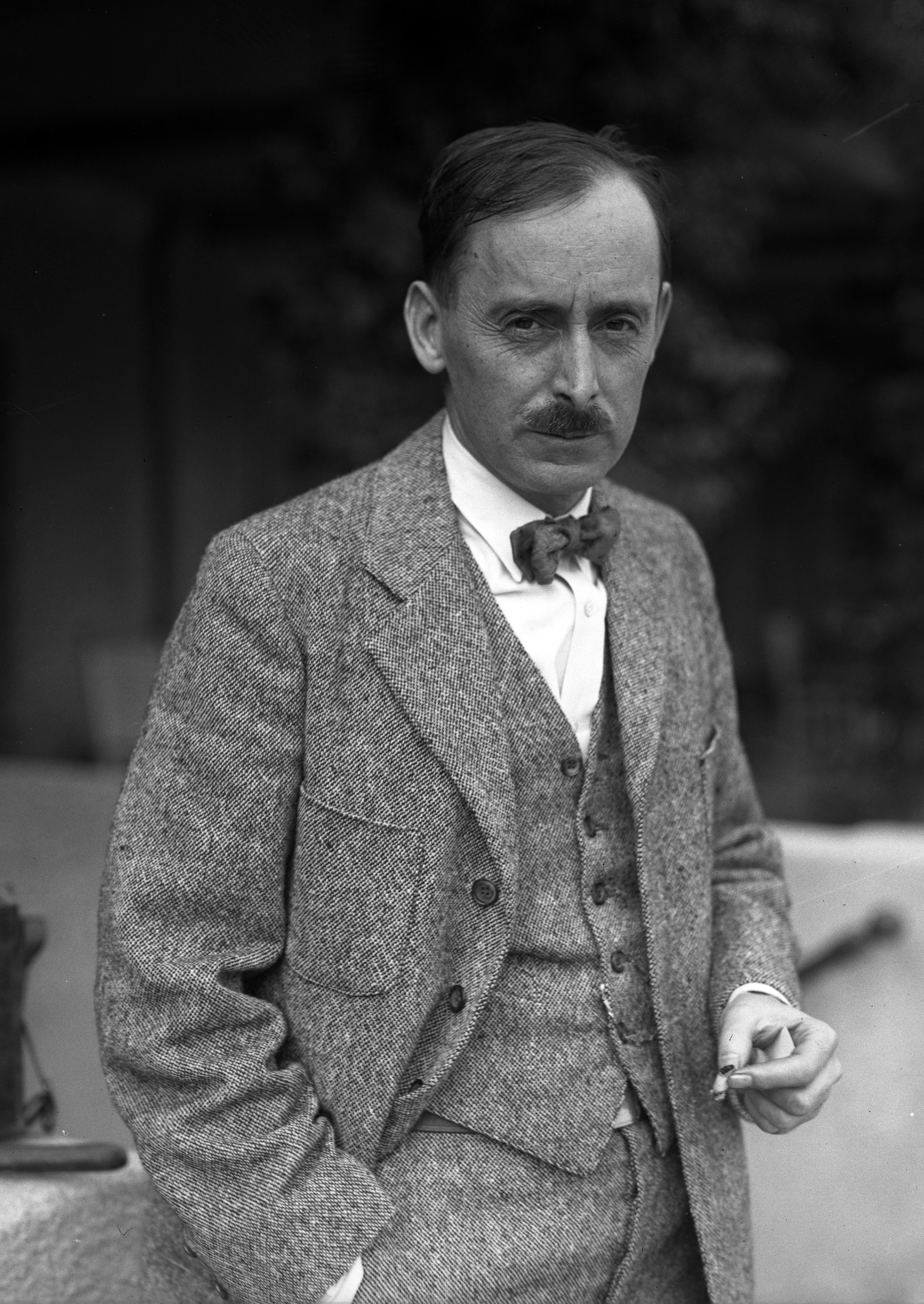
- Payne, c. 1927
- Born: March 1, 1883; Barry County, Missouri, U.S.
- Died: April 8, 1947 (aged 64); Los Angeles, California, U.S.
- Education: School of the Art Institute of Chicago
- Movement: California Impressionism
- Spouse: Elsie Palmer Payne

Edgar Alwin Payne (1 March 1883 – 8 April 1947) was an American painter. He was known as a Western landscape painter and muralist.

== Early life ==
Payne was born near Cassville, Barry County, Missouri, in the heart of the Ozarks. Cassville is in southwest Missouri, near the Arkansas border. According to the U.S. Census of 1900, he resided with his parents, two sisters and five brothers in Prairie Grove, Washington County, Arkansas; his Alabama-born father was employed as a carpenter. Edgar's occupation was listed as “carpenter, apprentice.”

Leaving home on several occasions, Payne painted houses, signs, portraits, murals, and local theater stage sets, to pay his way. Traveling through the Ozarks, then around the Southeast and Midwest, he finally wound up in Chicago, and enrolled to study portrait art at the School of the Art Institute of Chicago. He remained only two weeks at the institute, finding it too structured. He preferred instead to be self-taught, relying on practice and his own sense of direction.

Struggling at first, he soon exhibited a group of landscape works, painted on a small easel, at the Palette and Chisel Club. During this period he also obtained the occasional mural work to supplement his income.

In 1909, at the age of 26, he made his way to California for the first time. He spent several months painting at Laguna Beach, then headed to San Francisco. In San Francisco he met other artists, including commercial artist Elsie Palmer (1884–1971). He returned to California for a second time in 1911. When he returned to Illinois that fall, he found that Elsie had taken a job as commercial artist in Chicago. This cemented their already growing interest in each other. On the morning of their wedding day about a year later, 9 November 1912, Edgar noticed that the light was "perfect", and had Elsie postpone the ceremony until the afternoon.

As a couple, they became well known in Chicago's art circle. Elsie helped Edgar with his mural work, and soon he had an exhibition at the Art Institute of Chicago. Arguably their greatest collaborative effort happened in 1914 with the arrival of their daughter, Evelyn. Between 1915 and 1918-19 Edgar maintained a professional address in Chicago at the Tree Studio Building on East Ohio Street.

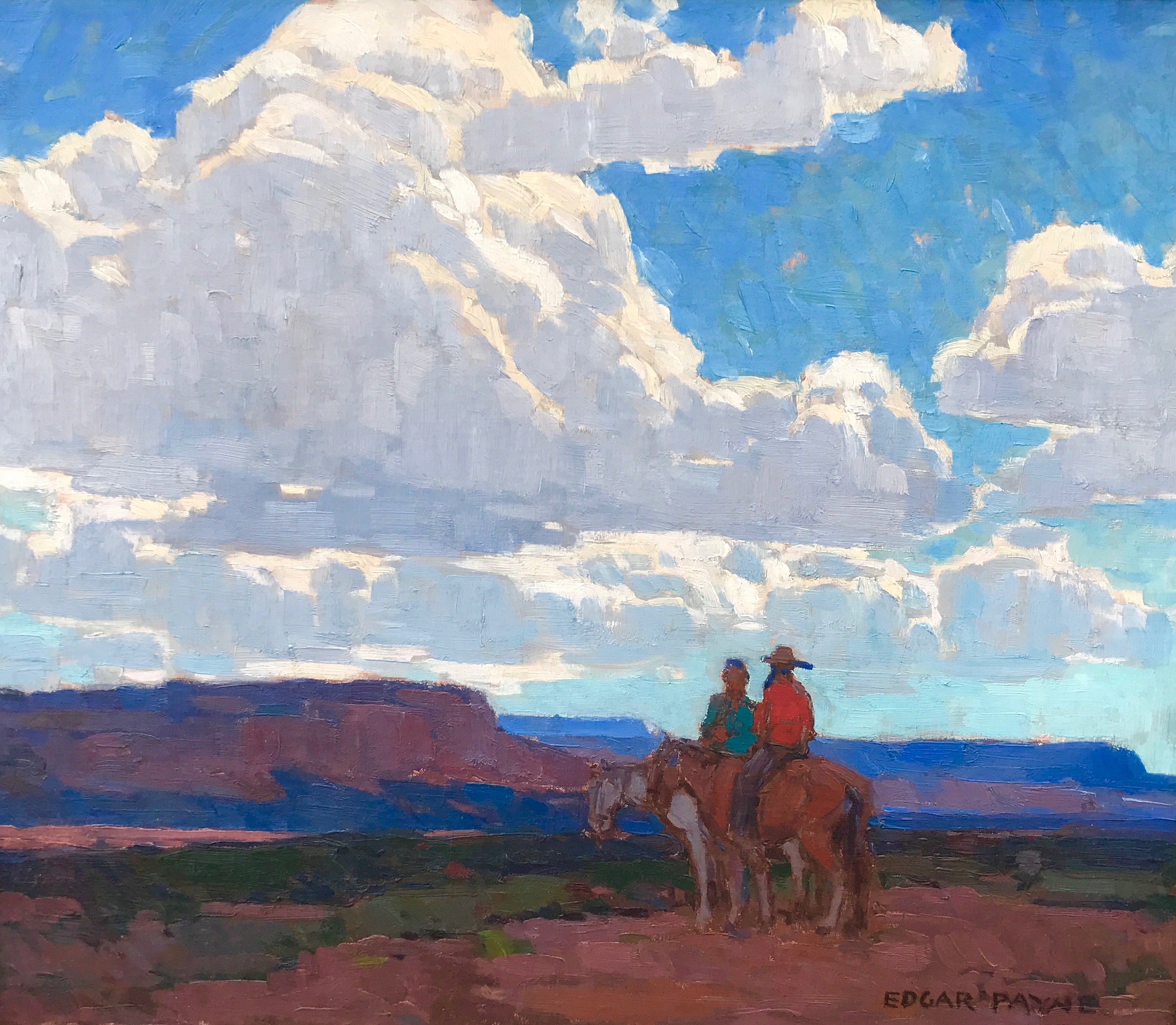
Edgar Payne "Arizona Sky" courtesy Steven Stern

== Major breakthroughs ==
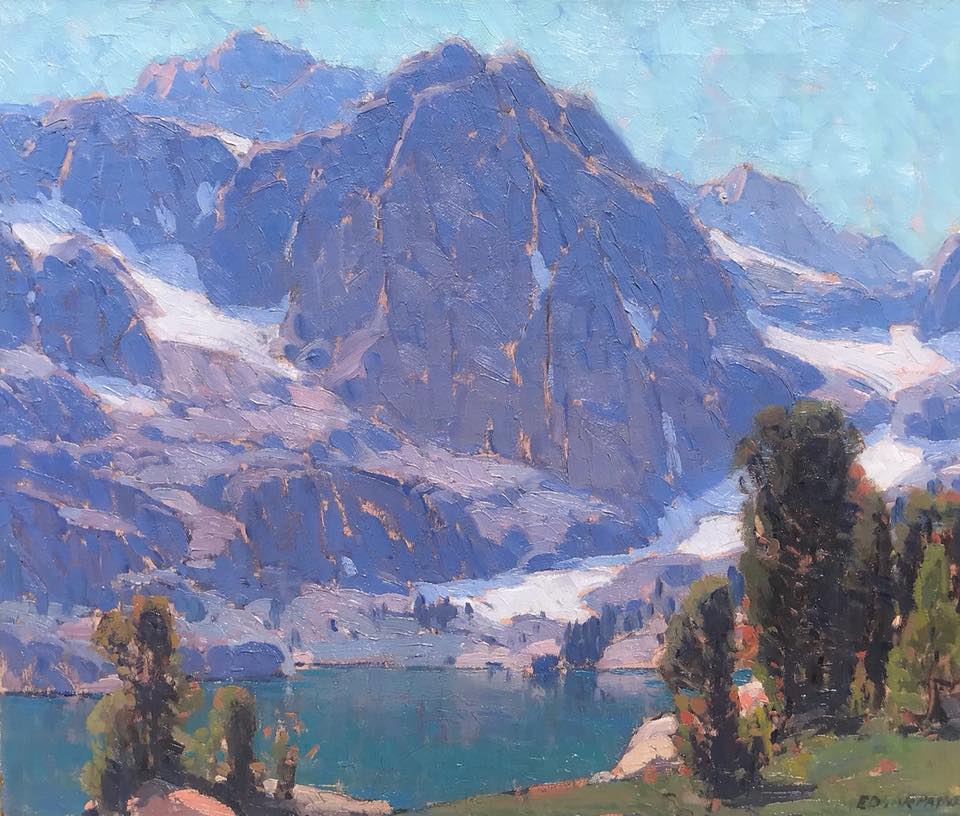
"Payne Lake" (Steven Stern Fine Arts)

The following spring they took Evelyn to see her maternal grandparents in San Francisco. They also attended the Panama–Pacific International Exposition. The following year Edgar made his first trip to the Sierra Nevada Mountains. This trip was a big moment in his life, and Payne would return again and again to paint the unspoiled Sierra; these paintings remain one of the hallmarks of his work.

He earned his first major commission in 1917. In a bid to attract tourism, the Atchison, Topeka and Santa Fe Railroad asked him to paint the Southwest, along the railroads' trek from Albuquerque to California. This commission not only solidified his reputation as an artist, it also forever linked him to Western America. Although he painted in Europe, he is most remembered for his work from the Four Corners area of the Navajo Nation Reservation, Yosemite, and the California coast. That year he and Elsie spent four months painting, exploring, and taking in Canyon de Chelly. This area, from Taos, New Mexico to the Grand Canyon, became one of Payne's two main inspirations for the next twenty years.

The Santa Fe Railroad commissions were the turn of the century brainchild of William H. Simpson, chief of the railway's advertising department. Starting in 1892, with Thomas Moran, Simpson exchanged travel on the train, along with lodging at railroad hotels and meals at railroad restaurants, and sometimes even cash, for paintings, photographs, pottery, and jewelry. This endeavor lasted for decades and made the Santa Fe one of the largest collectors of southwestern fine art.

When the Santa Fe commission expired the couple returned to San Francisco. Edgar received a commission from the Congress Hotel in Chicago for a mural on 11,000 square yards of muslin. The mural was to cover several floors of the hallways of the hotel. Payne rented a warehouse in Glendale, California and hired other artists, including Elsie, to help complete the work.

In 1918, Edgar and Elsie made their home and studio in Laguna Beach. He helped to organize the Laguna Beach Art Association and became its first president. They spent the next four years painting their way through the southwest, in places like Canadian Rockies in British Columbia and Alberta, Canada, and then exhibiting in the Los Angeles area. Sometimes their trips would involve hiking into the backcountry, looking for undisturbed places of raw and rare beauty to paint, sometimes for weeks. Edgar exhibited extensively in California, including such important venues as the California Art Club (1918–1921), California State Fair (gold medal 1918; silver medal in 1919), Cannell & Chaffin Galleries (1920), and Stendahl Galleries (1921–1922). The Paynes spent part of the summer of 1921 at the California art colony of Carmel-by-the-Sea where Edgar exhibited his work at the Fifteenth Annual Exhibition of the local Arts and Crafts Club. After finding success during this period, the trio took a two-year painting tour of Europe from 1922 to 1924, painting in Brittany, Paris, Provence, Switzerland, and Venice. His favorite place in Europe was the Alps, where he painted the Great White Peak of Mont Blanc, which the Paris Salon gave "an honorable mention" in spring 1923.

"The Great White Peak" is reputed to be in the collection of Newport Harbor High School in Newport Beach, California. This painting, and others, formed a collection of annual acquisitions at an art show sponsored to acquaint high school students with styles of painting and art. The collection was forgotten and distributed to various offices (and closets) in the school district. Its existence was rediscovered by school librarian John McGinnis who tracked down and restored all 56 of the missing paintings. The collection is now known as "The Ruth Stoever Fleming Collection".

Upon returning to the U.S. in the fall of 1924, the Paynes first stayed in Chicago, then went back to Laguna Beach, and then to New York City in 1926. Always on the go, they painted in Arizona, California, the California Sierras, Connecticut, New Mexico, New York, and Utah. They spent summers crossing the country, painting as they went. They returned to Europe to paint the harbors of Brittany, and Chioggia, in 1928. The following summer they painted Lake Louise, Alberta.

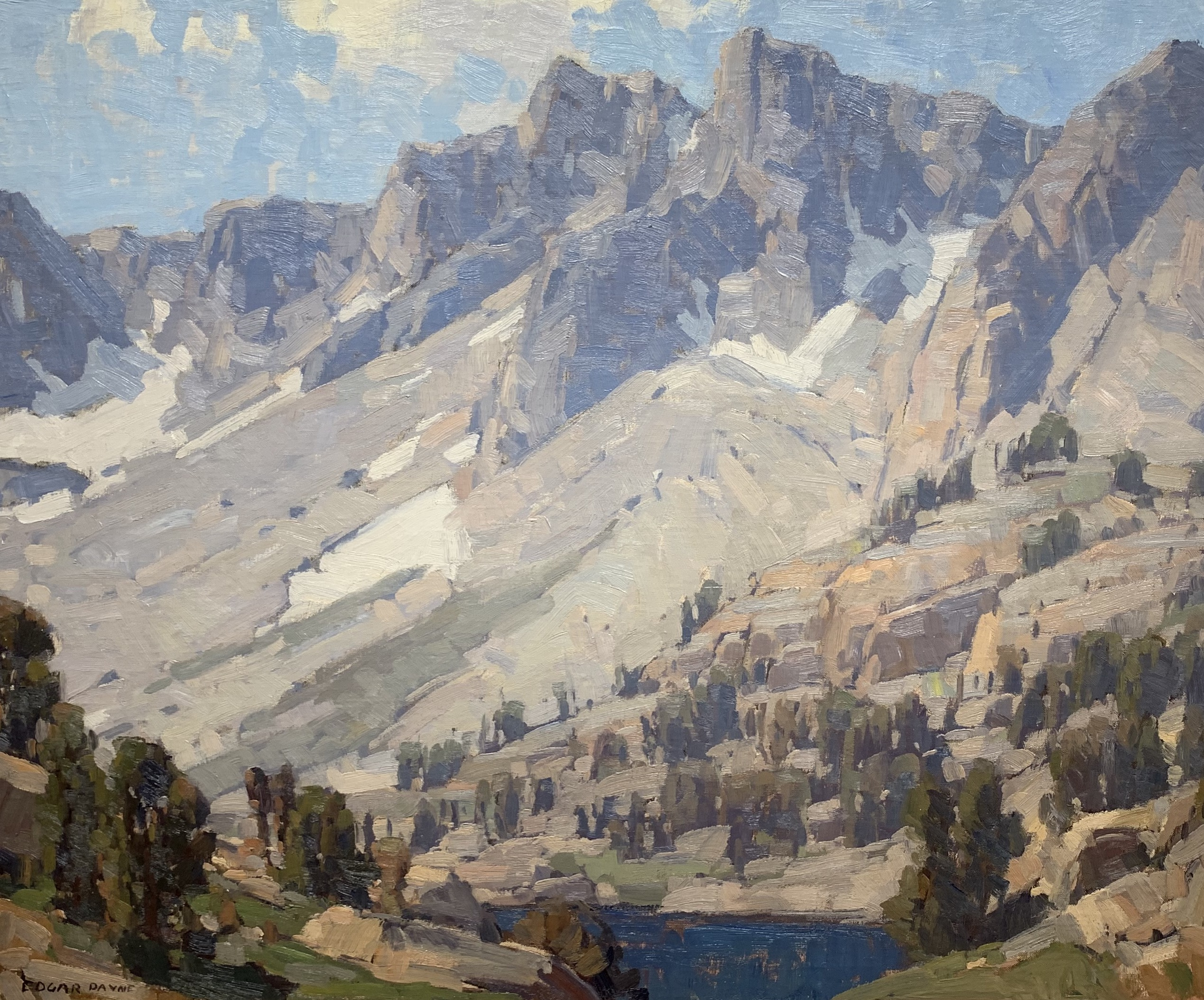
"Sierra Lake" Steven Stern Fine Arts

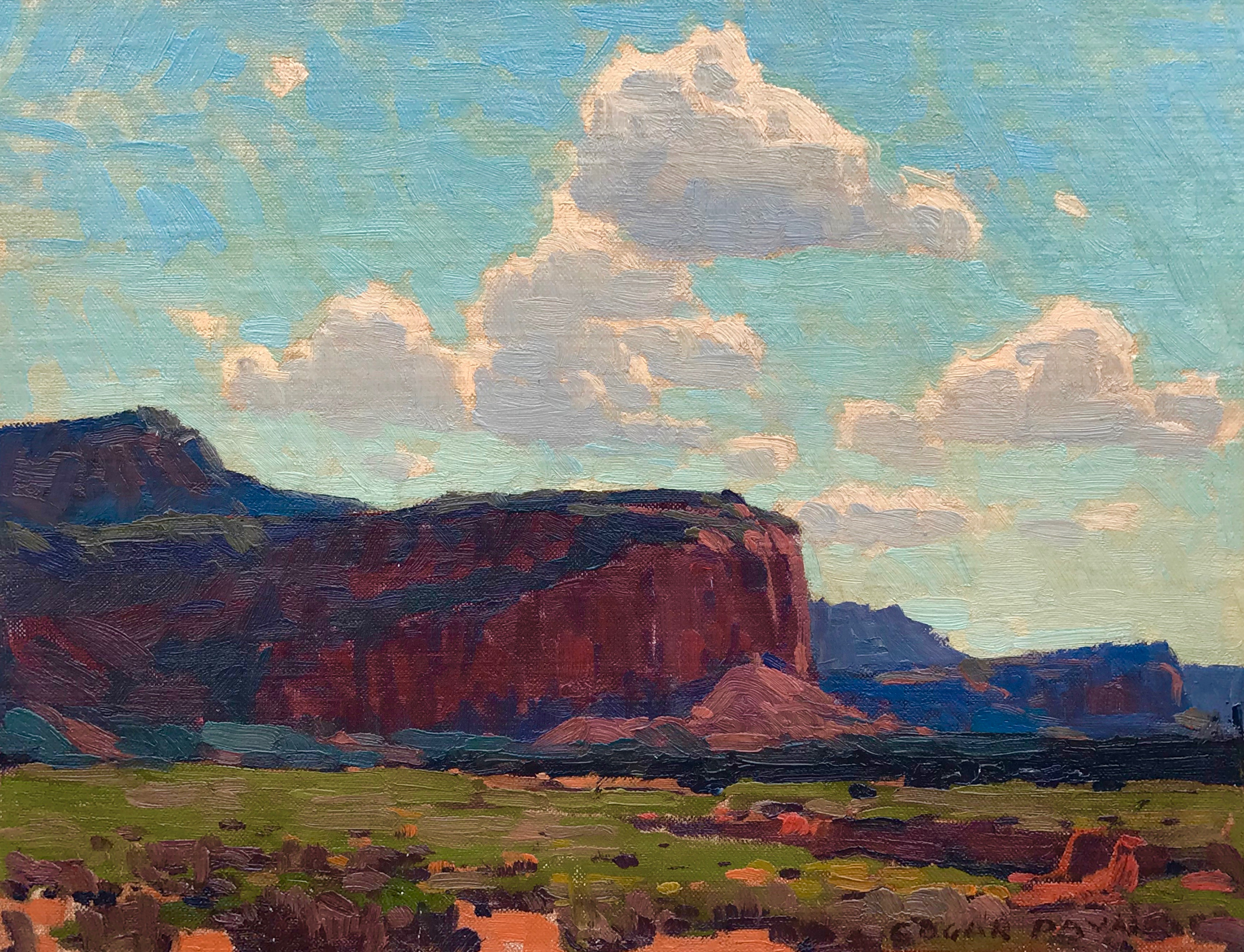
Edgar Payne "Continental Divide" Steven Stern

== Later life ==
After the financial collapse of 1929, and the subsequent Great Depression, commissions didn't come as easily, so the Paynes returned to Southern California on a more permanent basis, purchasing a new Los Angeles studio-home in 1932. During this time, Evelyn would marry, and Edgar and Elsie would become separated that same year. Edgar moved to Hollywood, to a small studio-home on Seward Street. However, he would spend a great deal of his time in the California Sierra Nevada Mountains, painting his favorite subject.

His lifelong obsession with the Sierras would lead him to produce a documentary film, Sierra Journey. In 1941 he wrote Composition of Outdoor Painting, a comprehensive book on composition and composition forms. The book also explains landscape painting techniques, color, repetition, rhythm, and value. The seventh edition printing of the work was completed in 2005.

After a 14-year separation, Elsie returned to help Edgar in 1946, upon learning that he had cancer. She stayed with him until he died on April 8, 1947.

There is a bronze relief sculpture of Edgar at the Laguna Beach Art Museum, done by Elsie in 1952. She championed his work until her own health, and degradation of eyesight, caused her to stop in 1959. She moved in with Evelyn and her husband, in 1969, in Minneapolis. Elsie died peacefully on June 17, 1971.

Some of Payne's works feature Italian harbors, the Alps, and landscapes of Laguna, but Edgar Alwin Payne is most remembered for his work of American Indians of the Four Corners area, and the paintings of his beloved Sierras. In the Sierras, high up in Humphrey's Basin, Payne Lake is named after him.

His work was an influence on Bill Wray and John Deckert.

== Public museum collections ==
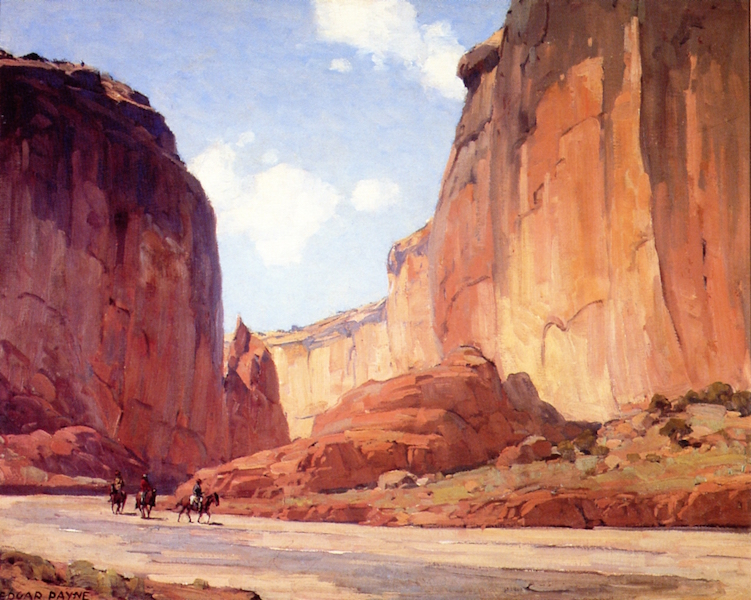
Canyon de Chelly

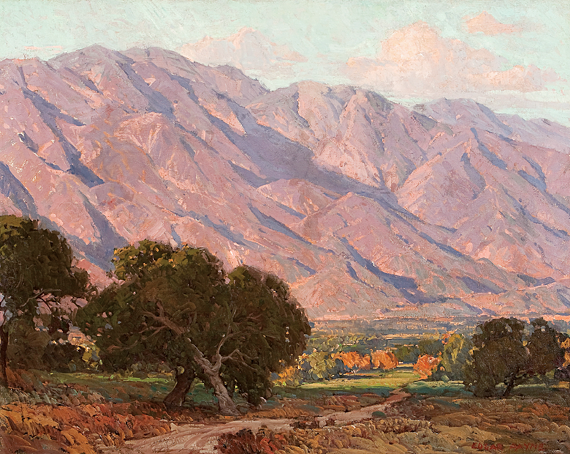
The Hills of Altadena

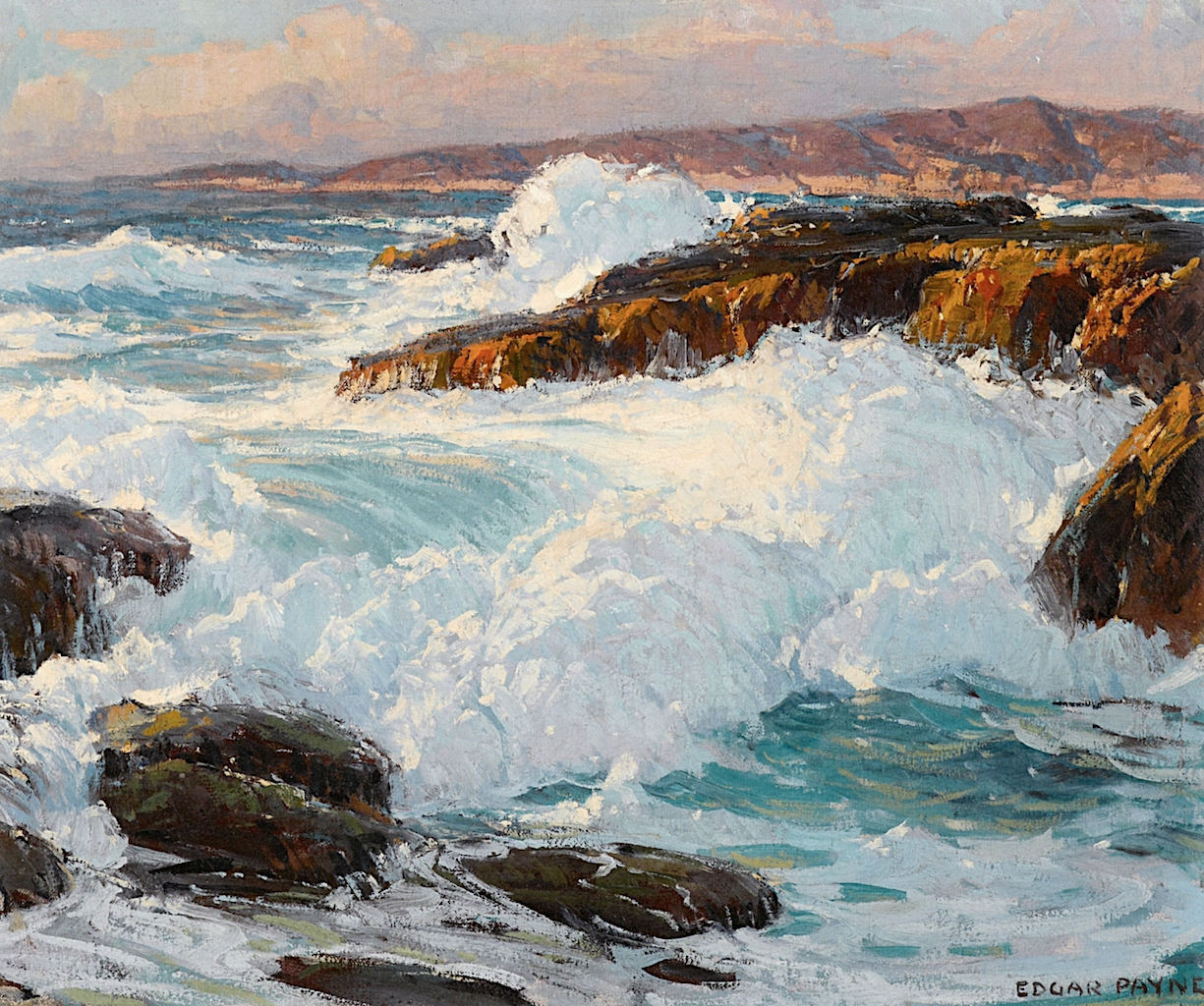
High Surf Along the Laguna Coast

Public museum collections with Payne's works include:

- Utah Museum of Fine Arts at the University of Utah
- Chicago Art Museum
- University of Nebraska Galleries
- Fleischer Museum (Scottsdale, Arizona)
- Indianapolis Museum of Art
- Laguna Art Museum, California
- National Academy of Design Collection
- National Collection of Fine Arts, Senate Building (Washington D.C.)
- Pasadena Art Institute
- Pasadena Museum of California Art
- Philbrook Museum of Art, Tulsa, Oklahoma
- Southwest Museum of Los Angeles
- Springville Museum of Art, Springville, Utah
- Crocker Art Museum, Sacramento, California
- Weisman Art Museum, University of Minnesota, Minneapolis, Minnesota
- Minneapolis Institute of Art, Minneapolis, Minnesota

== Memberships ==
- Allied Art Association
- American Artists Professional League
- California Art Club (President, 1926)
- Carmel Art Association
- Chicago Society of Artists
- International Society Art League
- Laguna Beach Art Association
- Palette and Chisel Club
- Salmagundi Club, New York City, New York
- Ten Painters of Los Angeles

== Sources ==
- Stern, Jean. Edgar "Artists in Santa Catalina Island Before 1945; Impressionism in Southern California". Director of The Irvine Museum in Irvine, California. (c/o Traditional Fine Arts Organization)
- Hughes, Edan Milton. Artists in California, 1786-1940. San Francisco, California: Hughes Publishing Company. 1989. ISBN 0-9616112-1-9
