= Henry Lee McFee =

American painter

- Born: April 14, 1886; St. Louis, Missouri
- Died: March 19, 1953 (aged 66); St. Luke Hospital; Pasadena, California

Henry Lee McFee (April 14, 1886 – March 19, 1953) was a pioneer American cubist painter and a prominent member of the Woodstock artists colony.

== Biography ==
McFee was born in St. Louis, Missouri in 1886. From 1902 to 1905, he attended Kemper Military School in Boonville, Missouri. In 1907, he inherited a large sum of money, allowing him to enroll in the Stevenson Art School and pursue painting full-time. He was heavily influenced by the two summers he spent attending classes at the Art Students League in Woodstock, New York, studying under L. Birge Harrison. In November 1913, McFee exhibited six works at the MacDowell Club. In 1919, McFee was one of the founders of the Woodstock Artists’ Association, along with Andrew Dasburg, Carl Eric Lindin, John Carlson, and Frank Swift Chase. In 1920, his work was shown at the Gallerie Georges Petit's International Art Exhibition in Paris. McFee's first one-man show was in 1927 at the Rehn Galler.

In 1939 McFee was appointed Director at the Witte Museum School of Art, which was sponsored by the San Antonio Art League. He was awarded a Guggenheim Fellowship in 1940, and in 1940-1941 he held positions at Claremont Graduate School and the Chouinard Art Institute in Los Angeles, California. He works closely with fellow Los Angeles artist and teacher Bentley Schaad.

McFee was married to Aileen Fletcher Jones from 1916 to 1936, when he eloped with her niece, Eleanor Brown Gutsell. McFee's synchromist and cubist influenced works were exhibited at many notable venues throughout his career, including the Carnegie Institute, the Pennsylvania Academy, the Corcoran Gallery, the Museum of Modern Art, and the Whitney Museum. McFee died in 1953 of pneumonia at St. Luke Hospital in Pasadena, California.

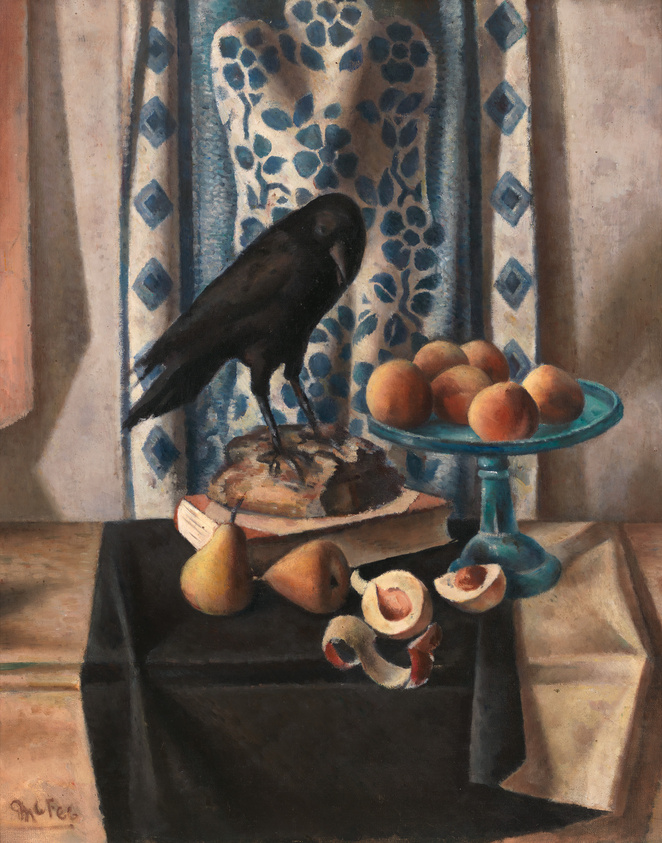
Crow with Peaches (1928), Whitney Museum of American Art

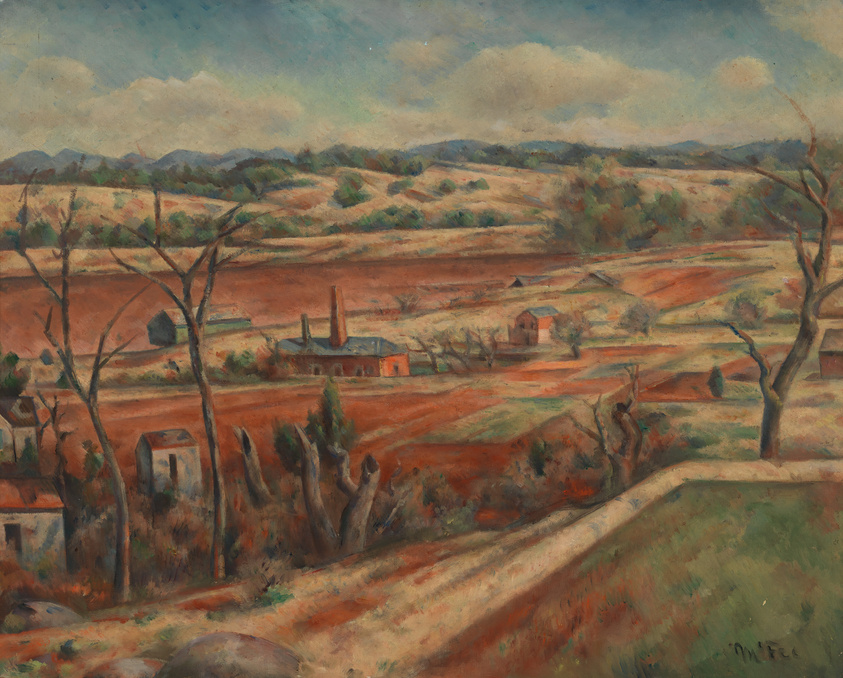
Red Fields in Virginia (1928-29), Whitney Museum of American Art

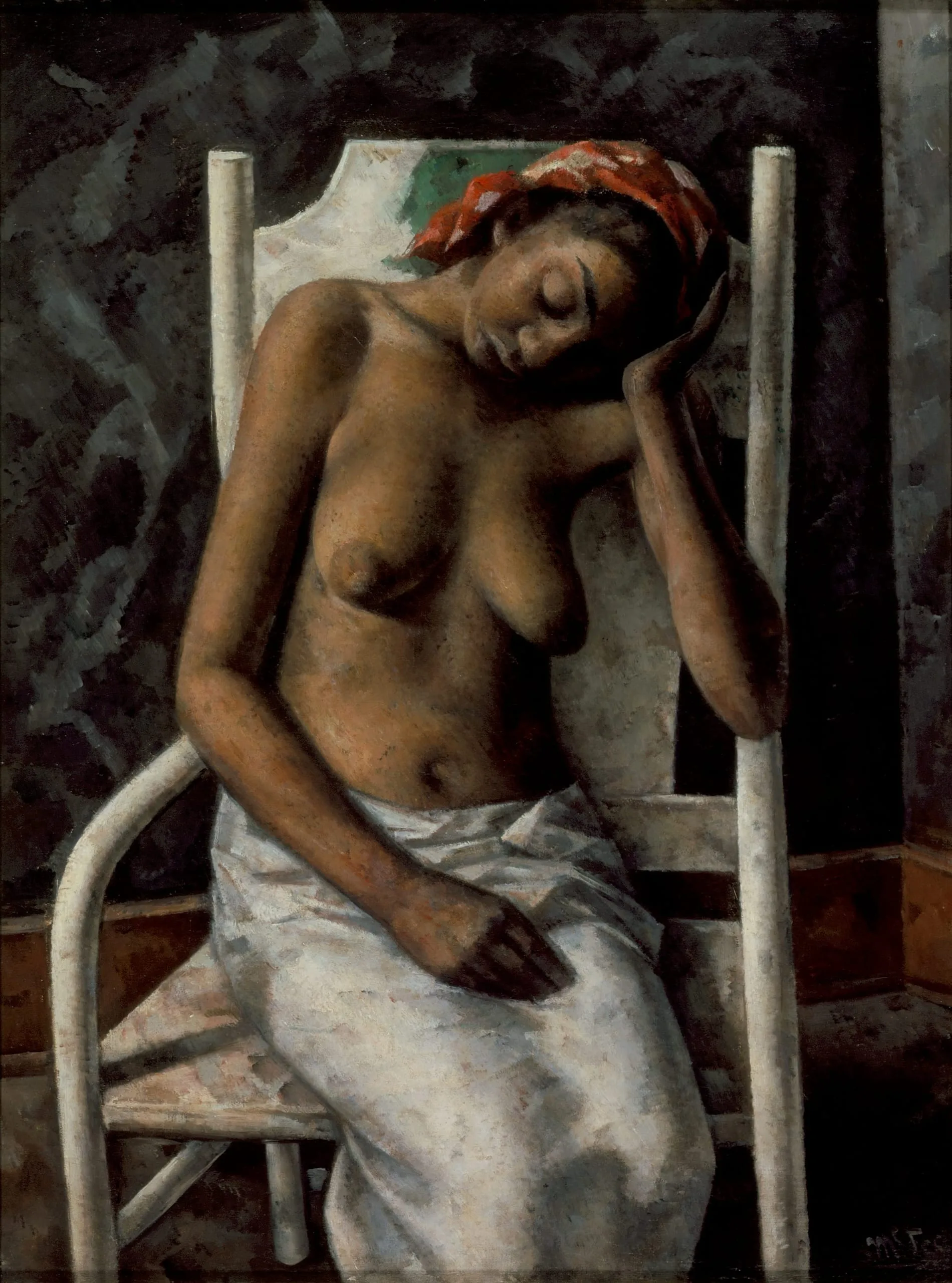
Sleeping Black Girl (1934), Los Angeles County Museum of Art

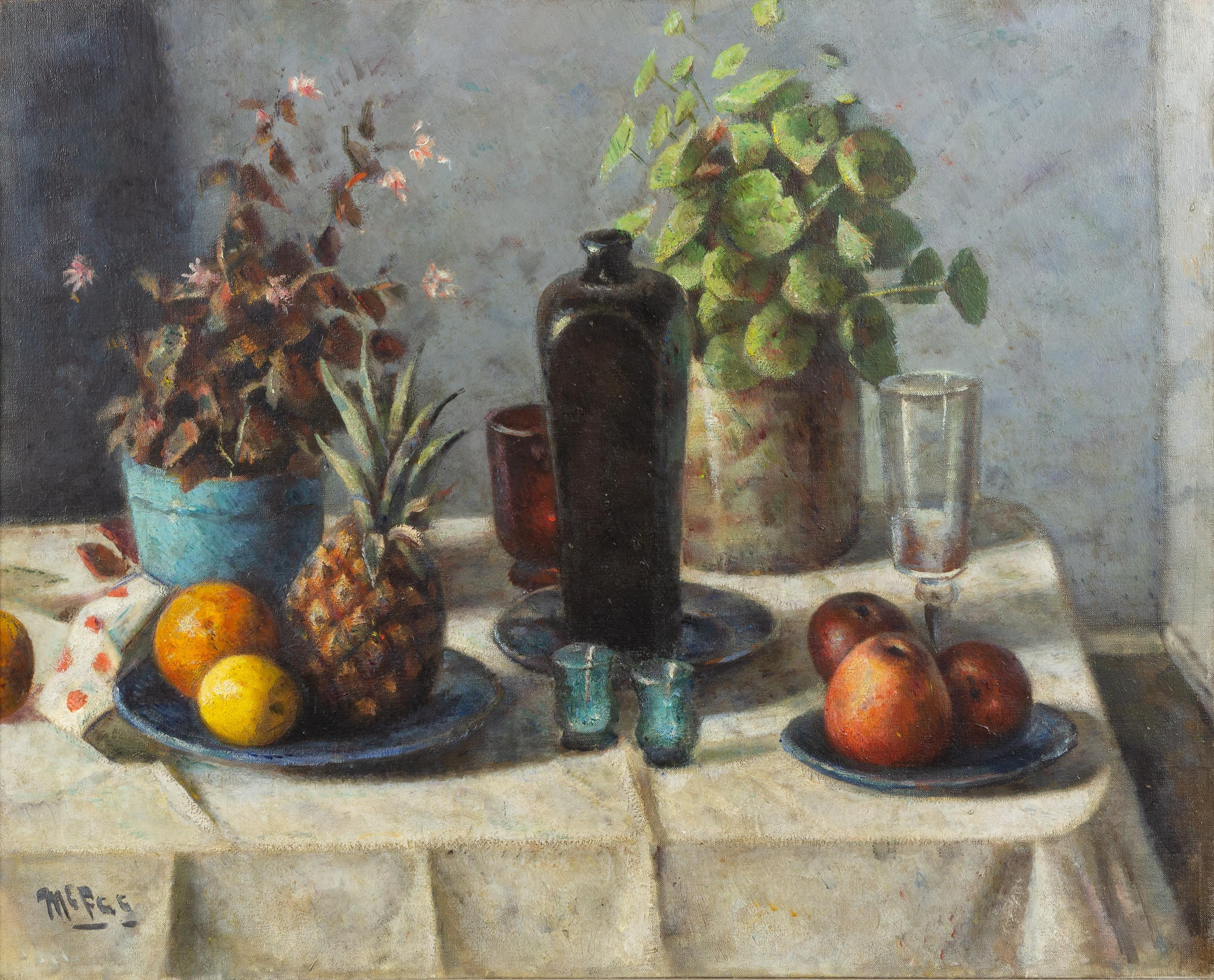
Aperitif (1939) ex coll. Indianapolis Museum of Art
