= Ruth Peabody =

American painter (1893–1966)

- Born: Ruth Eaton; March 30, 1893; Highland Park, Illinois, U.S.
- Died: October 22, 1966 (aged 73); Laguna Beach, California, U.S.
- Burial place: Fairhaven Memorial Park, Santa Ana, California, U.S.
- Other names: Ruth Eaton Peabody, Ruth Eaton Colburn Peabody
- Education: School of the Art Institute of Chicago
- Occupation(s): Painter, sculptor
- Movement: California Modernism
- Spouse: Hugh Kingman Peabody (m. 1918–)
- Mother: Elanor Colburn

Ruth Eaton Peabody (March 30, 1893 – October 22, 1966) was an American painter. Her work was part of the painting event in the art competition at the 1932 Summer Olympics.

== Life and career ==
Ruth Eaton was born on March 30, 1893, in Highland Park, Illinois. Her mother was painter Elanor Colburn, and her father was painter Charles Harry Eaton (1850–1901). In 1918, she married Hugh Kingman Peabody in Marlow, New Hampshire.

Peabody studied sculpture at the School of the Art Institute of Chicago. Around 1924 she moved with her mother to Laguna Beach, California, where they were some of the early artists in the area.
