= Frank Interlandi =

American editorial cartoonist

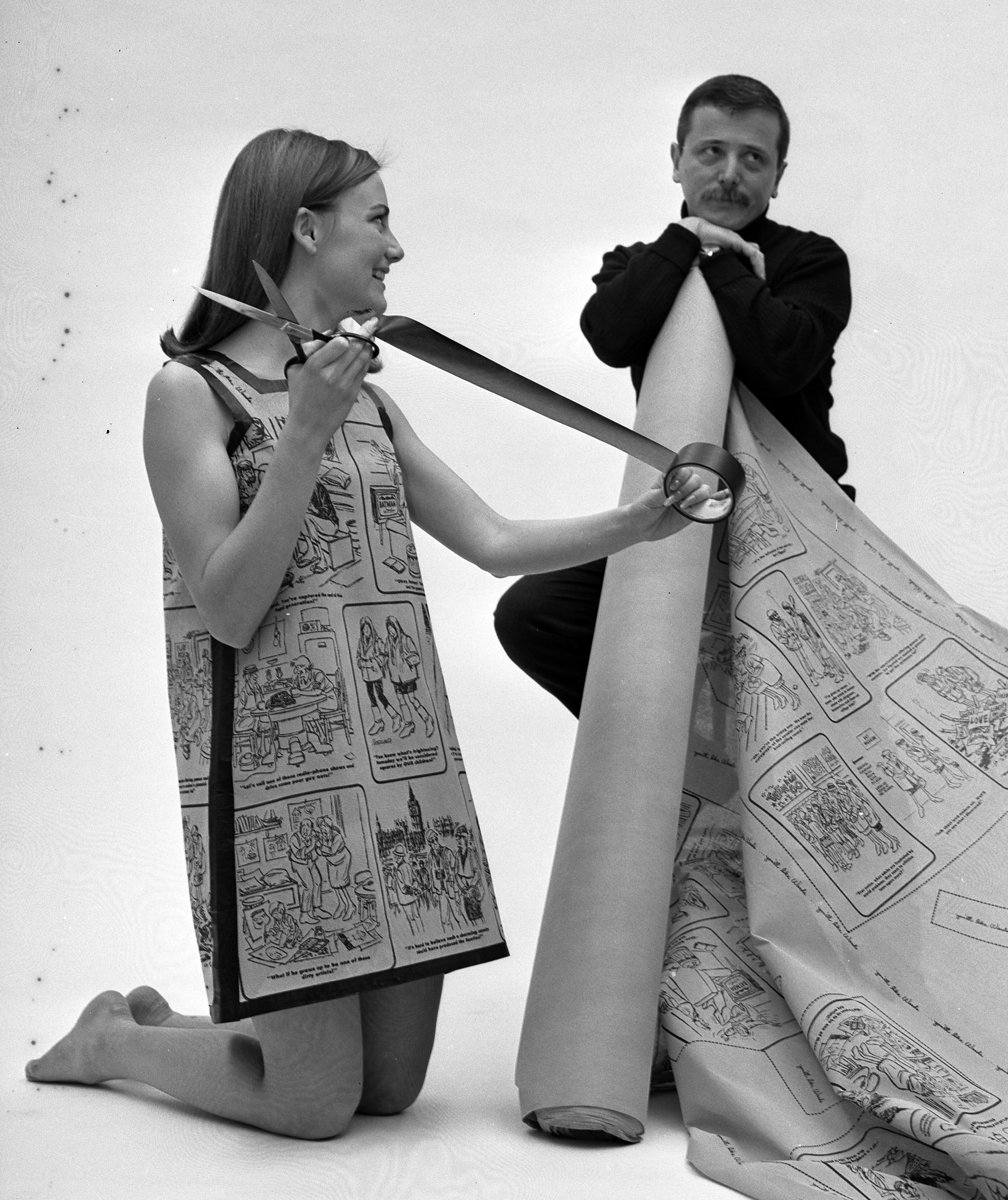
Interlandi in 1967 with a model wearing a dress with some of his cartoons printed on it

Frank Interlandi (1924 – February 4, 2010) was an editorial cartoonist for the Des Moines Register and the Los Angeles Times. While at the Register, he won the prize for best editorial cartoon given in 1961 by Sigma Delta Chi, the professional journalism society. A year later, he joined the Times, where he remained until 1981. His stock character in many cartoons was an "angry little old lady in tennis shoes".

Born in Chicago, Illinois, Interlandi was a self-described "Sicilian". He lived in Laguna Beach, California, for nearly 60 years. His twin brother, Phil Interlandi (1924 – June 28, 2002), was also a cartoonist for Playboy and other publications.

== World War II ==
The brothers joined the U.S. Army in 1941, and Frank was a medic at the Battle of the Bulge. He earned a degree in fine art from the University of Iowa in the 1950s. He minored in philosophy and religion. It was at the university he met his wife, Mitzi. They were married in 1955 and divorced in 1997.

Frank and Phil Interlandi both appeared on the 24 October 1957 episode of You Bet Your Life, hosted by Groucho Marx. The brothers won $2,000.

== Fine art ==
Interlandi was also an abstract Impressionist painter. His artwork was exhibited at the Festival of Arts for four decades, as well as galleries in Los Angeles and Laguna.
