= Anna Althea Hills =

American painter

Anna Hills
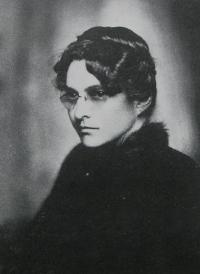
- Born: Anna Althea Hills; January 28, 1882; Ravenna, Ohio
- Died: June 13, 1930 (aged 48); Laguna Beach, California
- Occupation: Painter
- Known for: Impressionist landscapes Founding of the Laguna Beach Art Museum

Anna Althea Hills (January 28, 1882 – June 13, 1930) was an American plein air painter who specialized in impressionist landscapes of the Southern California coast.

Hills attended Olivet College, the Art Institute of Chicago and the Cooper Union for the Advancement of Science and Art in New York City. After her schooling, she worked for Arthur Wesley Dow. Hills traveled in Holland and England, attended the Academie Julian and studied with John Noble Barlow. She spent time in Lamorna Cove, home to many artists in the turn of the 20th century, including Samuel Lamorna Birch, and was with her brother, Willie Hills, at Inn cottage in the 1911 England Census. After returning to the United States, Hills traveled to the west coast and she switched from interior figures to impressionist landscapes. Hills settled in Laguna Beach, California where she opened a studio and taught.

Besides her painting, Hills was known for community activism. She was involved with the Presbyterian church and ran the Sunday school. For six years, she was president of the Laguna Beach Art Association (founded in 1918). As president, it was Hills' strong advocacy that led to founding the Laguna Beach Art Museum in Laguna Beach, California in 1929. In addition, Hills urged her friend, the respected artist and critic Jennie V. Cannon, to create at her summer home in Carmel-by-the-Sea a similar organization and art gallery, which was eventually founded in 1927 as the Carmel Art Association and adopted verbatim the Laguna Beach preamble: “To advance the knowledge of and interest in art; to create a spirit of co-operation and fellowship between painter and public.” Two years earlier Hills had been honored with a reception in Carmel.

== Awards ==
- Bronze medal, Panama–California Exposition, San Diego, 1915
- Bronze medal, California State Fair, 1919
- Landscape Prize, Laguna Beach Art Association, 1922 & 1923
