= Eddo Stern =

California-based artist, developer, and professor (born 1972)

- Born: 1972 (age 53–54); Tel Aviv, Israel
- Education: BFA: University of California, Santa Cruz. MFA: California Institute of the Arts
- Known for: Experimental Video Games, Game Art, Machinima
- Awards: Rockefeller Foundation Media Arts Fellowship, Rhizome at the New Museum NetArt Commission, Creative Capital Grant, ZKM International Media Award, Edith Russ Site for Media Art Stipend,
- Website: http://eddostern.com/

Eddo Stern (born 1972 in Tel Aviv) is a California-based artist and developer known for creating experimental video games, game art and machinima-based works. Stern was a founding member of the physical-computing based collective and artist-run space C-Level. He holds a BA in Electronic Media and Art from University of California, Santa Cruz and an MFA in Art and Integrated Media from California Institute of the Arts. A professor at University of California, Los Angeles' Design Media Arts program, he is additionally the director of the UCLA Game Lab.

== Career ==
Eddo Stern's work has been exhibited in a number of prestigious institutions including but not limited to the Sundance Film Festival, Tate Liverpool, The Haifa Museum of Art, Museo Reina Sofia, the Walker Art Center, Kunsthalle Düsseldorf, The New Museum, The Rotterdam Film Festival, The Kitchen, The Art Gallery of Ontario, Machine Project, The British Film Institute, and The Adelaide Film Festival.

== Projects ==
- Vietnam Romance (2015-present). Stern is currently working on a project called Vietnam Romance, which received a UCIRA grant and has been exhibited at Postmasters Gallery, Museum of the Moving Image and Babycastles Gallery in New York City, The Beall Center for Art and Technology at UC Irvine, Indiecade, Royal Ontario Museum, and Northern Spark in Minneapolis. The New York Times called the project "art you can play or watch" and described it as "a seasoned meditation on the relationship between war and gaming." In an article on the presentation of Vietnam Romance at Postmasters Gallery, Indie Game Magazine states that Stern "seeks to reassess the entertainment value of media released about the Vietnam War, in particular, with a large exhibit that blurs the lines between reality and fantasy to a point where they become indistinguishable."
- Best Flamewar Ever (2007). Best Flamewar Ever is a dual channel animation work presenting conversations between Everquest players. Art critic Zehra Jumabhoy describes the players' conversation depicted in ArtForum: "Their discussion of the game rapidly morphs into an excuse to trade insults, revealing the masculinity-obsessed aggression lurking behind even such seemingly innocent flights of fancy."
