= Frank Cuprien =

American painter (1871–1948)

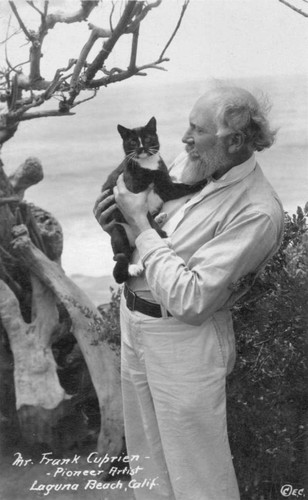
- Cuprien in Laguna Beach
- Born: Frank William Cuprien; August 23, 1871; Brooklyn, New York
- Died: June 21, 1948 (aged 76); Laguna Beach, California
- Occupation: Painter
- Known for: Impressionist marine landscapes

Frank William Cuprien (August 23, 1871 – June 21, 1948) was an American plein-air painter of the California impressionism movement, noted for marine scenes and opalescent seascapes. As a leading member of the Laguna Beach, California art colony, Cuprien became known as the "Dean of Laguna Artists."

== Education ==
Cuprien, born in Brooklyn, New York, studied both art and music. He took his art training at the Art Students League of New York and the Cooper Union Institute. He then studied landscape painting under Carl Philipp Weber in Philadelphia. During an 11-year residency in Europe, Cuprien studied art in Rome, with Karl Raupp in Munich, and at the Academie Julian in Paris.

Cuprien was also formally trained in voice and classical piano, attending the royal conservatory in Munich (Hochschule für Musik und Theater München) and graduating from the royal conservatory of Leipzig (Hochschule für Musik und Theater Leipzig) in 1905.

== Career ==
After returning to the United States from Europe, Cuprien spent 5 years teaching art at Baylor University in Texas. In 1912, he became enamored with the coastline of Southern California and briefly lived on Catalina Island before moving permanently to Laguna Beach, California. Cuprien moved into a rustic studio on a bluff overlooking the Pacific Ocean and named it "The Viking." Cuprien became an integral member of the artist community in Laguna Beach where he helped establish the Laguna Beach Art Association and its art gallery. His home was a gathering place for fellow artists, and served as a site for exhibitions and Cuprien's piano recitals. Cuprien became known as the "Dean of Laguna artists."

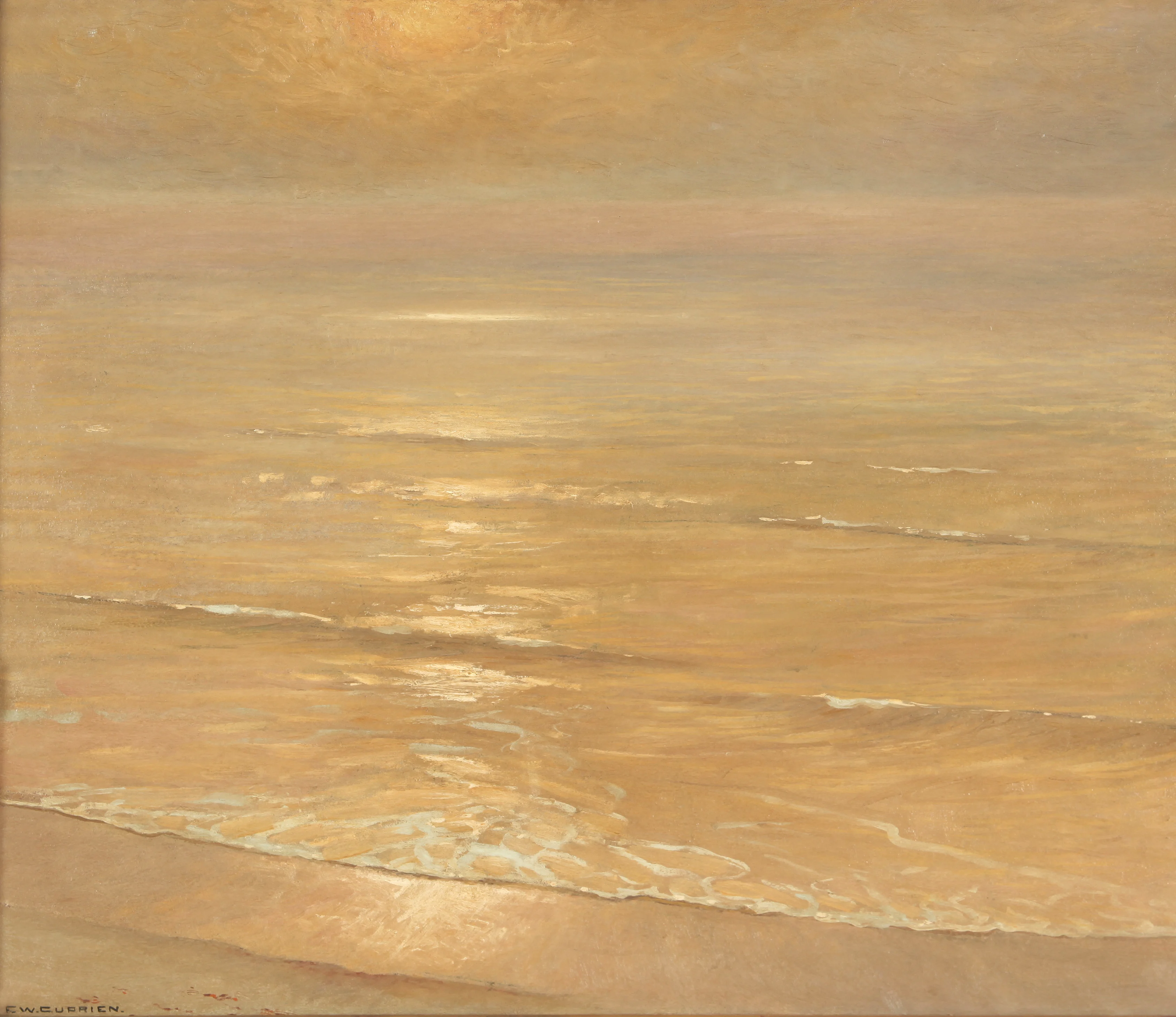
"The Golden Hour, Laguna Beach" by Frank Cuprien ca. 1923, oil on board, 24 x 28 in (Laguna Art Museum)

== Death ==
In 1948, Cuprien died after suffering a stroke. In his will, he left his estate to the Laguna Beach Art Association and requested that he be buried in his blue painter's smock. The street Cuprien Way in Laguna Beach was later named in his honor.
