= Bentley Schaad =

Bentley Schaad (1925–1999), was a California modernist and art educator.

Bentley Schaad was born in Los Angeles, California, in 1925. As an art student, he attended Jepson Art Institute, the Art Center in Pasadena and the Claremont Colleges. A pupil, and later a colleague, of Henry Lee McFee, Schaad learned the principles of line, color and form. His proficiency as an artist and his technical aesthetic innovations enabled him to begin teaching art at Otis Art Institute. Schaad spent the majority of his career as an instructor.

Schaad was a prolific artist in the West Coast modernist movement along with Henry Lee McFee, Rico Lebrun and Richard Haines. Schaad utilized many concepts of the modernist aesthetic in his work. His paintings were often composed of many broken planes of color — with a concentration on shape, form and structure of an object.
