= William A. Karges Fine Art =

Art gallery in California

Coordinates: 36.55557°N 121.92283°W

William A. Karges Fine Art is an art gallery at Dolores St. and 6th Ave in Carmel, California, United States.

== History and development ==
William A. Karges Fine Art was founded in 1987 by William A. Karges. A former collector of European antiques and objets d’art, he entered the art business after discovering the books Plein Air Painters of California: The North and Plein Air Painters of California: The Southland. After developing his expertise on the subject by seeking out works held in public and private collections throughout California, he eventually established a gallery that focuses primarily on historically important, museum quality paintings executed by California artists between 1870 and 1950. In addition to an emphasis on California Impressionism, William A. Karges Fine Art is active in the secondary market for works from the Hudson River School, Bay Area Figurative, and many other American artists and styles including Modern, Abstract, Northwest, and Southwest art. William A. Karges Fine Art also represents contemporary artists Dennis Doheny and Cindy Baron.

== California impressionism and California plein-air painting ==
William A. Karges Fine Art specializes most notably in California Impressionism and California Plein-Air Painting. Considered to be a regional variation on American Impressionism, the terms describe the large movement of 20th century artists who worked out of doors (en plein air), directly from nature in California, United States. Their work became popular in the San Francisco Bay Area and Southern California in the first three decades after the turn of the 20th century.

Most of the Plein Air painters came from the East and Midwest in the US, and Europe, and only a few of the early artists such as Guy Rose (1867–1925) were actually born and raised in California. Some of the most prominent names associated with the Plein-Air school are the aforementioned Rose, William Wendt (1865–1946), Granville Redmond (1871–1935), Edgar Payne, Armin Hansen (1886–1957), Jean Mannheim (1861–1945), John Marshall Gamble (1863–1957), Franz Bischoff (1864–1929), William Ritschel (1864–1949), Alson S. Clark (1876–1949), Hanson Puthuff (1875–1972), Marion Wachtel (1875–1954), and Jack Wilkinson Smith (1873–1949). Most of these artists were already trained in art when they moved to California, arriving between 1900 and the early 1920s.

== Notable exhibitions and publications ==
The gallery has released extensive catalogues in conjunction with notable exhibitions on artists including Ross Dickinson, The Early Works (1993); Jesse Arms Botke, Birds, Boughs, and Blossoms (1995); Rinaldo Cuneo, An Evolution of Style (1991); and Clyde Scott, Clyde Scott: Paintings From the Robert and Rea Westenhaver Collection (1999). The exhibition program has also featured multiple solo shows for contemporary painter Dennis Doheny.

== Artists represented ==
- William Adam (1846–1931)
- Gustave Baumann (1881–1971)
- Franz Bischoff (1864–1929)
- Carl Oscar Borg (1879–1947)
- Cornelis Botke (1887–1954)
- Jessie Arms Botke (1883–1971)
- George Brandriff (1890–1936)
- Maurice Braun (1877–1941)
- Benjamin Brown (1865–1942)
- Conrad Buff (1886–1975)
- Norton Bush (1834–1894)
- William Clapp (1879–1954)
- Alson Clark (1876–1949)
- Marvin Cone (1891–1964)
- Colin Campbell Cooper (1856–1937)
- Rinaldo Cuneo (1877–1939)
- Leland Curtis (1897–1989)
- Paul de Longpre (1855–1911)
- Ross Dickinson (1903–1978)
- Maynard Dixon (1875–1946)
- Frederick Carl Frieseke (1874–1939)
- John Frost (1890–1937)
- John Marshall Gamble (1863–1957)
- Selden Gile (1877–1947)
- Percy Gray (1869–1952)
- Armin Hansen (1886–1957)
- Thomas Hill (1829–1908)
- Clark Hobart (1868–1948)
- Thomas Hunt (1882–1938)
- William F. Jackson (1850–1936)
- Joseph Kleitsch (1881–1931)
- George Cochran Lambdin (1830–1896)
- Paul Lauritz (1889–1975)
- Alfredo Ramos Martinez (1871–1946)
- Francis McComas (1874–1938)
- Thomas McGlynn (1878–1966)
- Gustavo Montoya (1905–2003)
- John Mottram (1903–1953)
- Gilbert Munger (1837–1903)
- Jose Clemente Orozco
- Jules Pages (1867–1946)
- Edgar Payne (1883–1947)
- Agnes Pelton (1881–1961)
- Alfonso X. Pena (1903–1964)
- Charles Rollo Peters (1862–1928)
- Gottardo Piazzoni (1872–1945)
- C.S. Price (1874–1950)
- Hanson Duvall Puthuff (1875–1972)
- Joseph Raphael (1869–1950)
- Granville Redmond (1871–1935)
- Charles Reiffel (1862–1942)
- Mary Curtis Richardson (1848–1931)
- William Ritschel (1864–1949)
- Guy Rose (1867–1925)
- Paul Sample (1896–1974)
- Birger Sandzen (1871–1954)
- Millard Sheets (1907–1989)
- William Silva (1859–1948)
- Jack Wilkinson Smith (1873–1949)
- Will Sparks (1862–1937)
- George Gardner Symons (1863–1930)
- Elmer Wachtel (1864–1929)
- Marion Kavanaugh Wachtel (1870–1954)
- Nell Walker Warner (1891–1970)
- William Wendt (1865–1946)
- Edith White (1855–1946)
- Orrin White (1883–1969)
- Theodore Wores (1859–1939)

William A. Karges Fine Art also represents of the estates of:

- J.A. Botke
- Cornelis Botke
- Rinaldo Cuneo
- Ross Dickinson
