= Botke =

Botke is a surname. Notable people with the surname include:

- Cornelis Botke (1887–1954), Dutch-born American painter and etcher
- Jessie Arms Botke (1883–1971), American painter
