= Eric Spencer Macky =

New Zealand-born American artist and professor

2nd President of California College of Arts and Crafts
- In office 1944–1954
- Preceded by: Frederick Meyer
- Succeeded by: Daniel S. Defenbacher

Personal details
- Born: November 16, 1880 Ponsonby, New Zealand
- Died: May 5, 1958 (aged 77) San Francisco, California, U.S.
- Spouse: Constance Lillian Jenkins (m. 1912–1958; death)
- Children: 2
- Education: Elam Art School, National Gallery of Victoria Art School, Académie Julian
- Occupation: Painter, printmaker, educator, academic administrator
- Other names: Spencer Macky, E. Spencer Macky

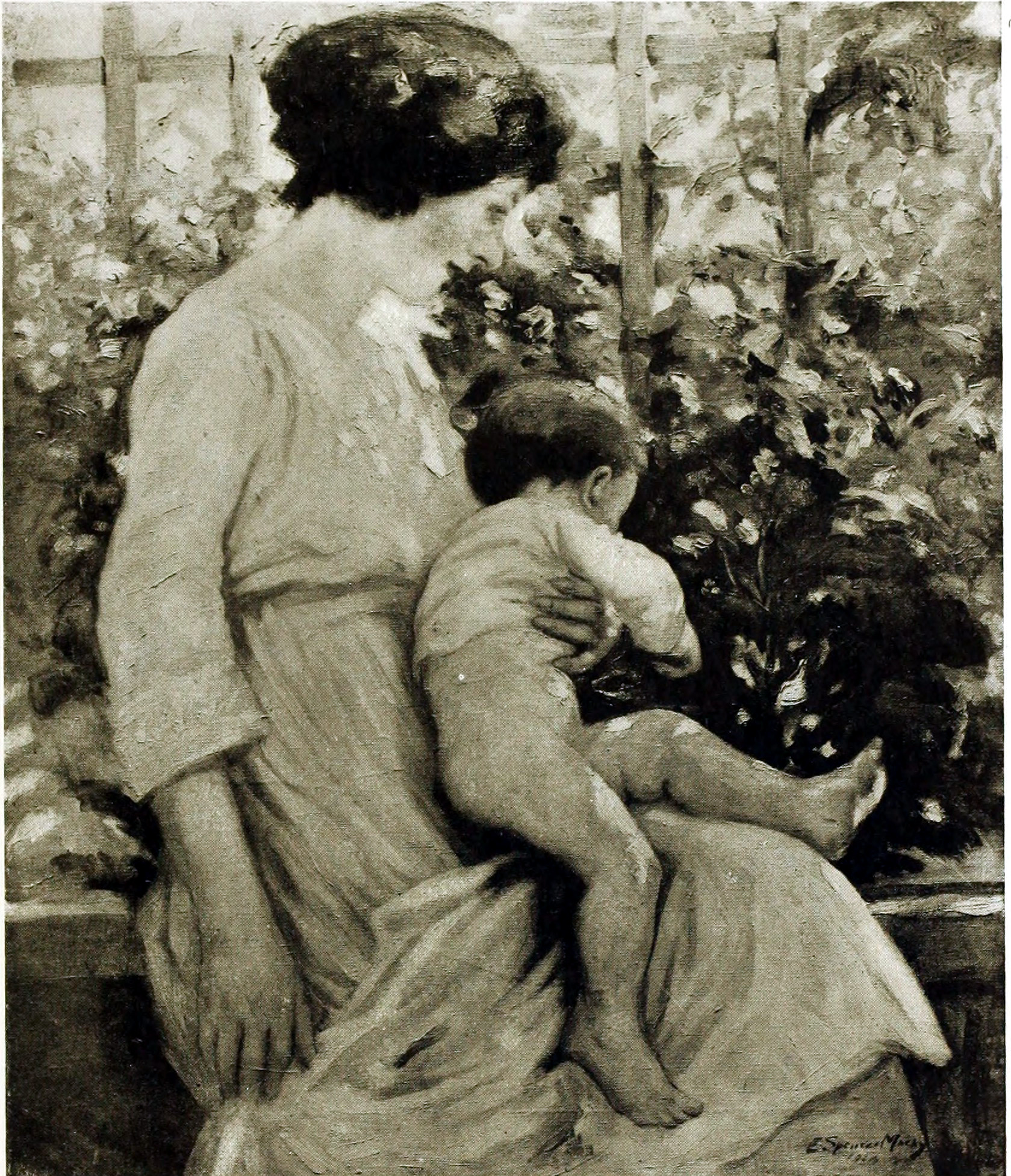
Mother and Child (1916, cropped) by Eric Spencer Macky

Eric Spencer Macky, also known simply as Spencer Macky (1880–1958) was a New Zealand-born American painter, intaglio printmaker, academic administrator, and educator. He was president of the California College of Arts and Crafts (now the California College of the Arts), from 1944 until 1954. He also founded the Spencer Macky Art School in San Francisco, from 1916 until 1917. He was also known for his landscape paintings and scenes of San Francisco.

== Biography ==
Eric Spencer Macky was born November 16, 1880, in Ponsonby near Auckland, New Zealand. He was interested in art at a young age and by age 14, he was attending the Elam Art School on a scholarship and studied under C. F. Goldie. From 1903 to 1906, Macky attended National Gallery of Victoria Art School (formally National Gallery School of Painting) studying under Lindsay Bernard Hall; and continued studies in 1907 at Académie Julian in Paris under Jean-Paul Laurens.

Macky arrived in the San Francisco Bay Area between 1910 and 1912. He taught at California School of Arts and Crafts (now known as California College of the Arts) from 1913 to 1921; University of California, Berkeley; and he was the Dean of California School of Fine Arts (now known as San Francisco Art Institute) from 1919 until 1935. He had notable students including Robert Boardman Howard, George Post, and John Melville Kelly.

In 1944, Spencer Macky was appointed President of California College of Arts and Crafts when the college's founder Frederick Meyer retired. Macky held this position for a decade, until 1954.

In 1916, Spencer Macky and his spouse Constance founded the Spencer Macky Art School in San Francisco. The first location of the school was at Post Street, near Gough Street in a building that housed many other notable artists including Leo Lentelli, Clark Hobart, William Claussen, Louise Mahoney, Florence Lundberg, Sigmund Beel, and George Hyde. The school was popular and moved to a larger space at the "Artists Building" at 535 Sacramento Street in San Francisco. By 1917, the Spencer Macky Art School was merged with the California School of Fine Arts (CSFA; now known as the San Francisco Art Institute).

In 1912, Spencer and Constance were married in Berkeley, California. They had two sons. Their son, Donald Spencer Macky (1913–2007) was also an artist.

== Death and legacy ==
Macky died on May 5, 1958, in San Francisco. Macky's work is included in public museum collections, including the Fine Arts Museums of San Francisco, Musée d'Orsay, Seattle Art Museum, and Auckland Art Gallery Toi o Tāmaki.

In fall 2013, three lost murals were discovered on the campus of San Francisco Art Institute, including Spencer Mackey’s Life Drawing Class (1936) by Eleanor Bates Streloff. Artist Ruth Cravath carved a bust of Macky in 1935, which is now part of the collection at the San Francisco Museum of Modern Art.
