= George Post (painter) =

American painter

- Born: George Booth Root III; September 29, 1906; Oakland, California
- Died: March 26, 1997 (aged 90); San Francisco, California
- Known for: Watercolor painting
- Movement: California style watercolor

George Booth Post (September 29, 1906 – March 26, 1997) was an American watercolorist and art educator. He was an important contributor of the California style watercolor movement (also known as the California School of watercolor, part of the California Scene Painting school) of the mid 1920s until the mid 1950s.

== Biography ==
Post was born as George Booth Root III at his grandfather's home in San Francisco, California. He spent several years in Gold Hill, Nevada with his mother and stepfather Walter Post, then returned to California to live in Oakland. In 1921, he received a scholarship to study at the California School of Fine Arts (CSFA) now called the San Francisco Art Institute. His teachers were Gottardo Piazzoni, Otis Oldfield, Ray Boynton, Eric Spencer Macky, and Constance Lillian Jenkins Macky. Post was a long time faculty member at California College of Arts and Crafts. He died of pneumonia in San Francisco, California at age 91.

"In the old gold rush country. I had sent two or three watercolors down to the Palace of the Legion of Honor Museum in San Francisco for a California show and Mr. Thomas Howe had just become director of the museum or he was assistant director."

— George Post,
