= Degrees-R-Us =

Unaccredited educational institution

Degrees-R-Us is an unaccredited institution that offers degrees of higher learning. USA Today reported it is a diploma mill. In 2004, it was included in a Senate investigation.

The operation was run by a disbarred attorney from his Las Vegas home and "a GAO investigator ordered those bogus degrees in the name of Sen. Susan Collins (R) of Maine, who had commissioned the agency to investigate the ease of purchasing such degrees."

== Connected institutions ==
- Lexington University, a dormant institution purportedly located in Middletown, New York, which is different from Lexington College, a regionally accredited institution

== See also ==
- List of unaccredited institutions of higher learning
- University Degree Program
