= Nell Walker =

Nell Walker may refer to:

- Nell W. Walker (1888–1962), American politician from West Virginia
- Nell Walker Warner (1891–1970), American painter from California
