= Lundborg =

Lundborg is a surname. Notable people with the surname include:

- Einar Lundborg (1896–1931), Swedish aviator
- Florence Lundborg (1871–1949), American artist
- Herman Bernhard Lundborg (1868–1943), Swedish physician
- Patrick Lundborg (1967–2014), writer on pop culture and author of the book The Acid Archives

== See also ==
- Unverricht–Lundborg disease (abbreviated ULD or EPM1), the most common form of progressive myoclonic epilepsy
