= Constance Jenkins Macky =

Australian-born American artist and professor

- Born: Constance Lillian Jenkins; June 29, 1883; Melbourne, Victoria, Australia
- Died: November 17, 1961 (aged 78); San Francisco, California, U.S.
- Burial place: Sunset View Cemetery, El Cerrito, California, U.S.
- Other name: Constance Lillian Jenkins Macky
- Education: National Gallery of Victoria Art School, Académie Julian
- Spouse: Eric Spencer Macky (m. 1912–1958; death)
- Children: 2
- Parents: John S. Jenkins (father); Emma Wright (mother)

Constance Jenkins Macky (née Constance Lillian Jenkins; 1883–1961) was an Australian-born American artist and teacher. She was known for her portraits, landscape paintings, and still life paintings.

== Early life and education ==
Constance Lillian Jenkins was born June 29, 1883, in Melbourne, Victoria, Australia. Her parents were Emma Wright and John S. Jenkins, her father was of Scottish descent. She was the youngest of six children, and began to study art seriously at age 15.

Macky attended the National Gallery of Victoria Art School (formally National Gallery School of Painting), from 1900 to 1908 and first exhibited her 1907 work Friendly Critics (now held in the NGV), with four other paintings, at the Australian Exhibition of Women's Work. The painting won her the NGV Travelling scholarship, enabling her to study at the Académie Julian in Paris during 1909.

== America ==
In 1912, Jenkins married Eric Spencer Macky in Berkeley, California. They had two sons, including Donald Spencer Macky (1913–2007) who was also an artist. In 1915, the Macky's both participated in the Panama–Pacific International Exposition, creating decorative panels for the Australian and New Zealand Buildings.

== Educator ==
Constance Jenkins Macky and her spouse founded the Spencer Macky Art School in San Francisco in 1916. The first location of the school was at Post Street, near Gough Street in a building that housed many other notable artists including Leo Lentelli, Clark Hobart, William Claussen, Louise Mahoney, Florence Lundberg, Sigmund Beel, and George Hyde. The school was popular and moved to a larger space at the "Artists Building" at 535 Sacramento Street in San Francisco. By 1917, the Spencer Macky Art School was merged with the California School of Fine Arts (CSFA; now known as the San Francisco Art Institute). After the merge she continued to teach classes at CSFA.

She was a member of the San Francisco Art Association, and the California Society of Women Artists.

== Death and legacy ==
Macky died on November 17, 1961, in San Francisco. She is buried in the Sunset View Cemetery in El Cerrito, California. Macky's work is included in public collections including the National Gallery of Victoria, the National Library of Australia, and others.
