= William S. Rice =

American artist (1873–1963)

William Seltzer Rice
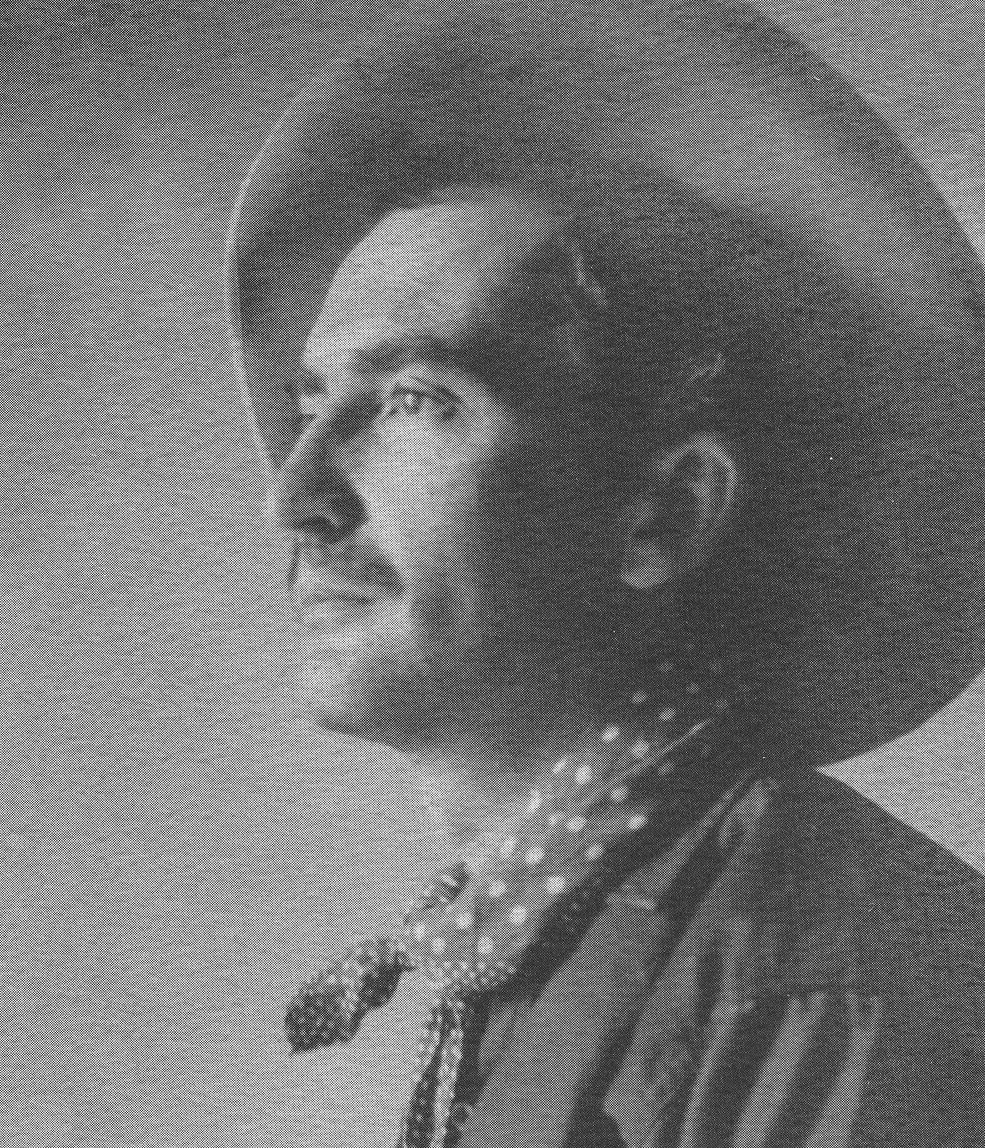
- William Seltzer Rice, 1906
- Born: June 23, 1873; Manheim, Pennsylvania
- Died: August 27, 1963 (aged 90); Oakland, California
- Resting place: Manheim, Pennsylvania
- Education: Drexel University, University of the Arts
- Alma mater: California College of the Arts
- Years active: 1910–1950s
- Known for: Woodblock prints
- Movement: Arts and Crafts Movement
- Spouse: Susan Steel
- Children: 3

William Seltzer Rice (June 23, 1873 – August 27, 1963) was an American woodblock print artist, art educator and author, associated with the Arts and Crafts movement in Northern California.

== Early life and education ==
Born and raised in Manheim in Lancaster County, Pennsylvania, Rice grew up with his parents in his grandparents' home on Market Square that had been occupied by his family for four generations. His parents were John Rice and Sara Seltzer Rice. His grandfather, Samuel Rice, operated a carriage painting business in a shop at the back of the property. Interested in painting from a young age, William Rice set up a small studio in the corner of his grandfather's shop. He took occasional lessons from itinerant painters.

After completing high school, Rice began teaching drawing, saving his money to attend art school in Philadelphia, where he lived with a cousin. He won an art school scholarship, and also got a job with the Philadelphia Times as a staff artist. He began studies in 1893 at the newly founded Drexel Institute, where Howard Pyle was among his teachers.

Rice also attended classes at the Pennsylvania Museum and School of Industrial Art, now known as the University of the Arts. There, he began a friendship with Frederick Meyer, a German immigrant who later was hired as art supervisor for the Stockton public schools.

== Career ==
=== Teaching ===
In 1900, Meyer hired Rice as an assistant art supervisor for Stockton public schools, and Rice relocated to Stockton, California. By 1902, Meyer moved to San Francisco, and Rice was promoted to Meyer's job. Rice began a personal exploration of scenic California, visiting Yosemite National Park in 1901 and Lake Tahoe in 1904. He also visited all of the Spanish missions in California.

In 1910, Meyer convinced Rice to relocate to the San Francisco Bay Area to participate more actively in the Arts and Crafts Movement, and Rice obtained a job teaching art for the Alameda public schools. He fraternized with members of the Berkeley Art Colony and contributed his block prints to their Exhibition of California Artists at the Hillside Club in 1911.

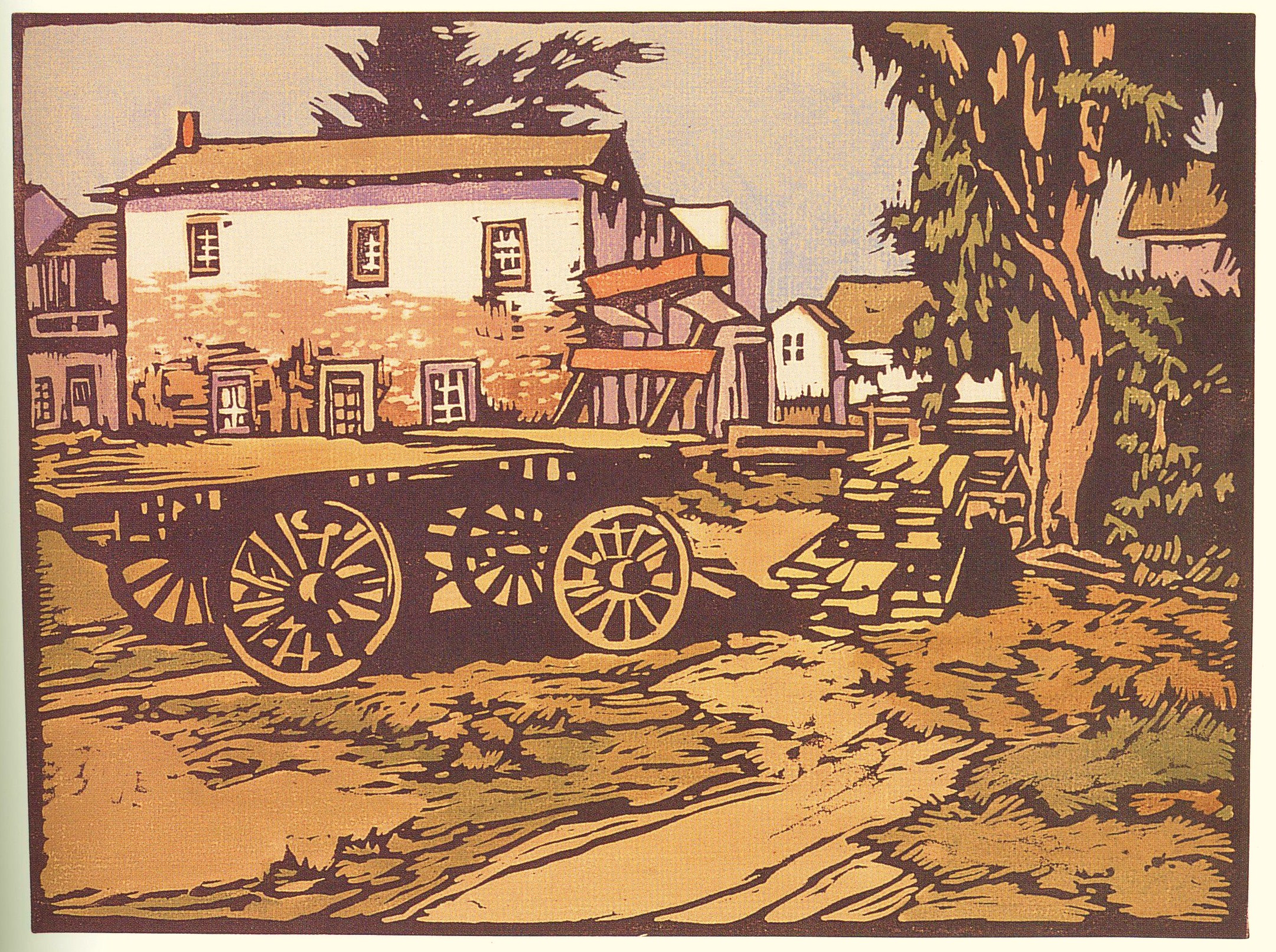
R. L. Stevenson house - Monterey, 1915

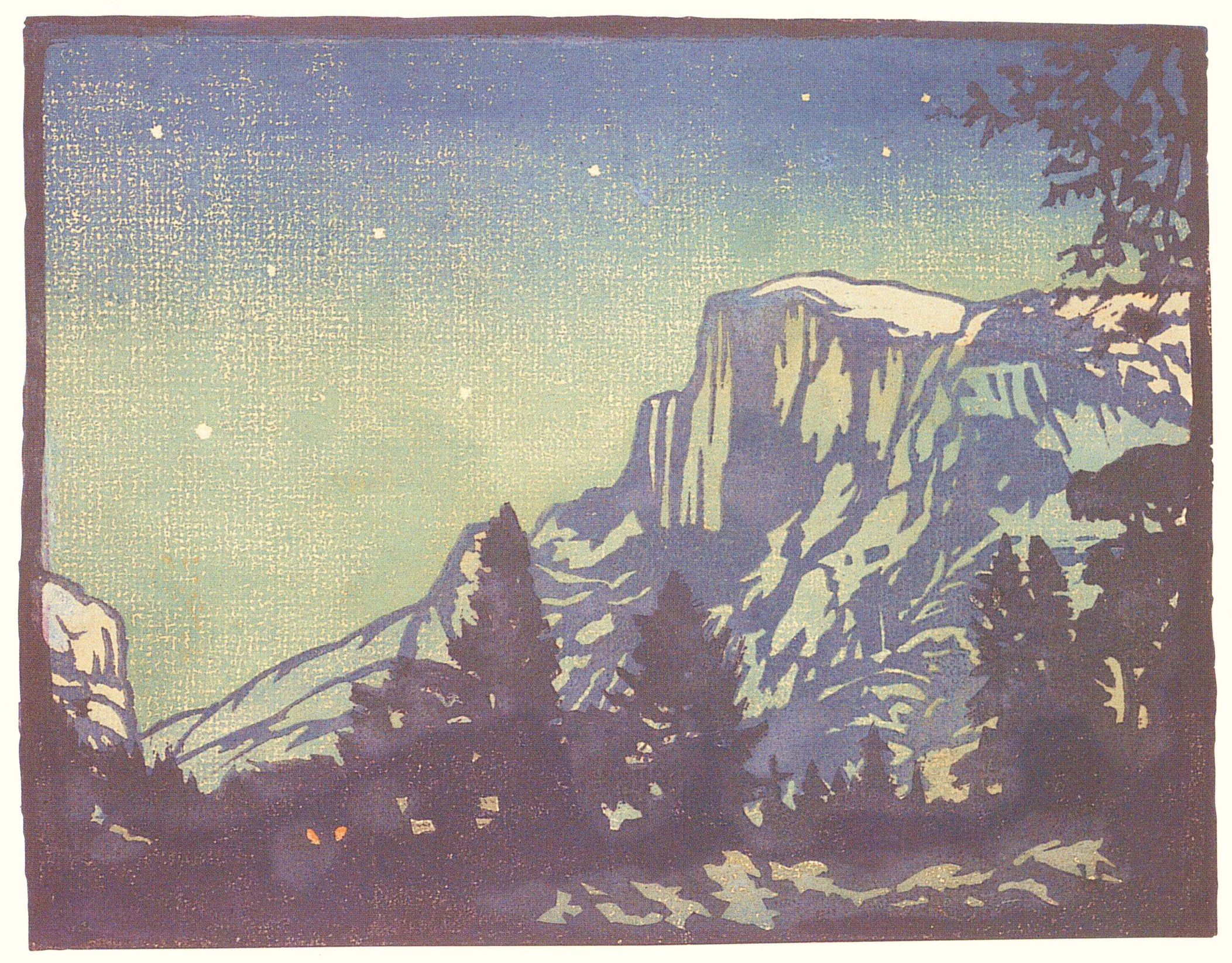
Night - Yosemite, 1920

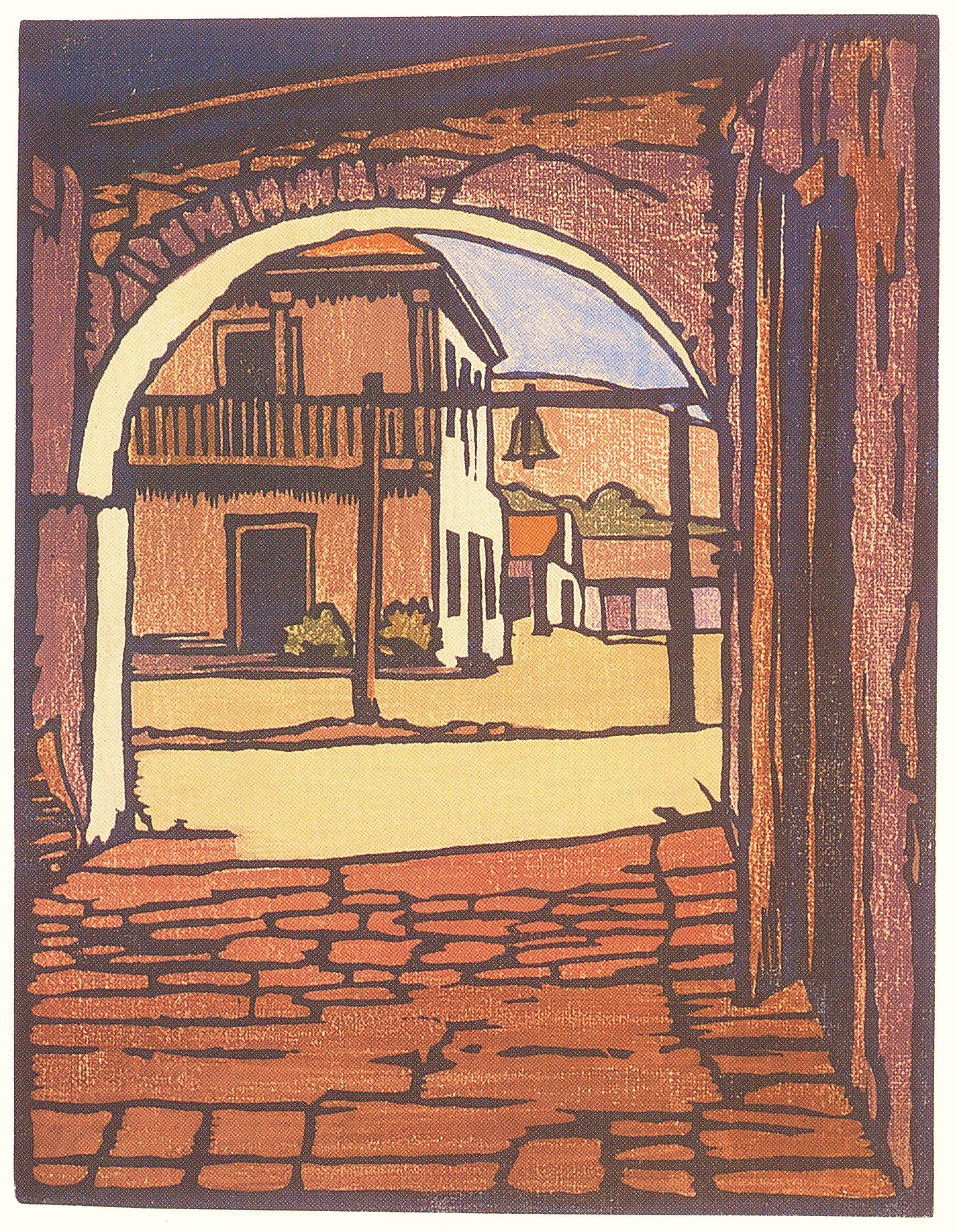
San Juan Bautista, 1920 .

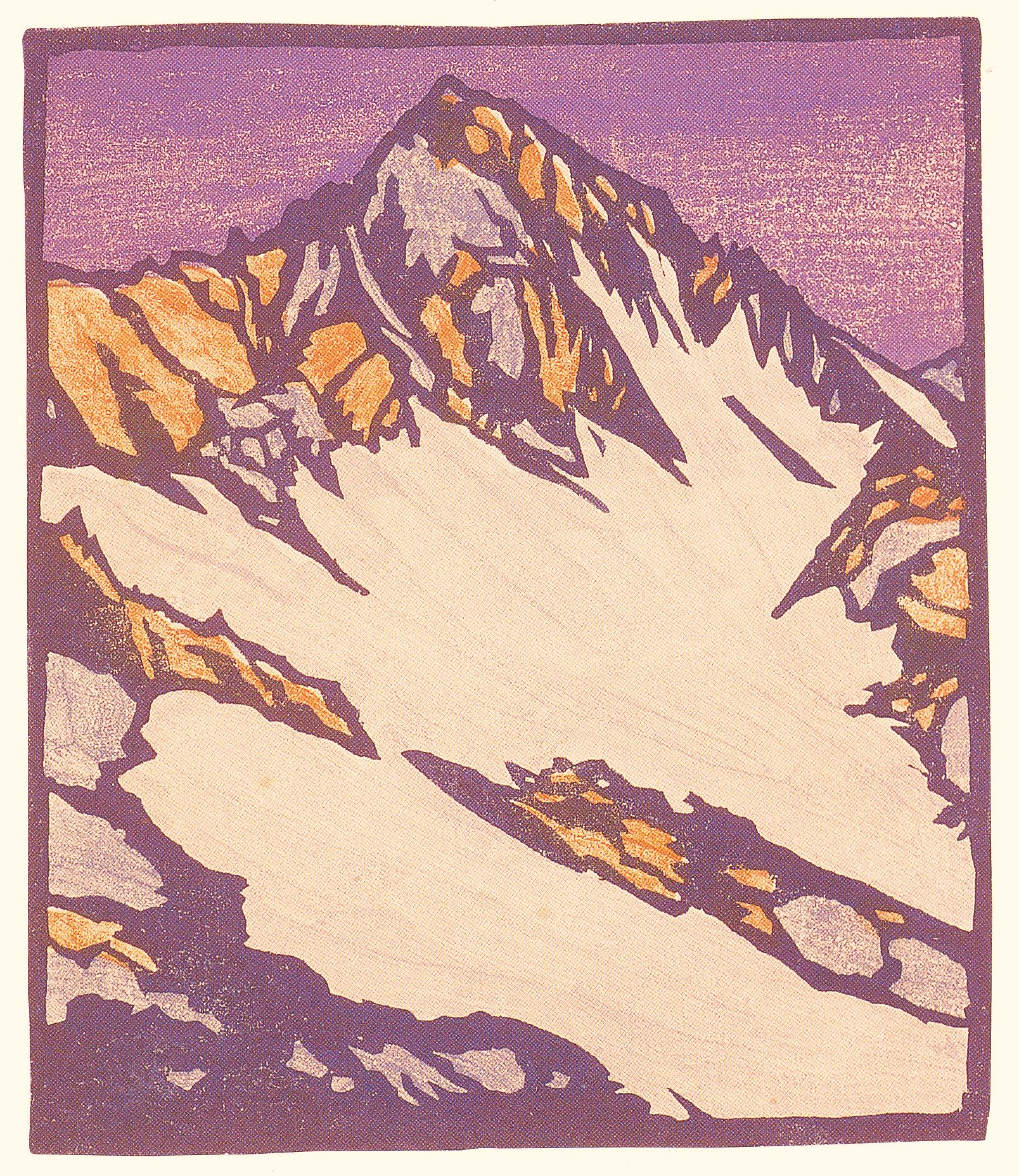
Source of the Glacier, 1920.

Rice spent the rest of his professional career teaching art in the Alameda and Oakland public schools, including at Alameda High School, Fremont High School (1919–30), Castlemont High School (1930–40), and the UC Extension evening classes at University of California, Berkeley (1932–43). He taught drawing and painting, as well as a variety of crafts, including metalworking and leather working.

Rice's friend Frederick Meyer had founded the School of the California Guild of Arts and Crafts, originally located in Berkeley and later in Oakland. After receiving accreditation, the school was renamed in 1936 the California College of Arts and Crafts and in 2003 became the California College of the Arts. Meyer hired Rice to teach summer classes at his school and Rice was able to obtain his B.F.A. in 1929 from the School of the California Guild of Arts and Crafts.

=== Fine art and commercial art ===
He began freelance writing and illustrating for Sunset Magazine.

In 1913, Rice studied design with Ralph Johonnot, an associate of Arthur Wesley Dow, who was an early advocate of color block printing in the United States. Rice toured Europe in the summer of 1913, visiting Chartres, Rothenberg and Venice.

In 1915, Rice married Susan Steel, and they honeymooned at Lake Tahoe, California. That same year, the Panama–Pacific International Exposition took place in San Francisco, and he was impressed by the Japanese woodblock prints he saw there. He resolved to become a woodblock print artist. Instead of following the traditional Japanese team method, where an artist did an original painting, who then turned it over to a team of wood carvers and printers, he decided to take control of the entire creative process himself.

In 1918, Rice had his first major exhibition of wood and linoleum block prints at the Palace of Fine Arts in San Francisco, which was designed by Bernard Maybeck for the Panama Pacific International Exposition.

Gump's in San Francisco was one of his leading dealers. His work was displayed in the printmaker's exhibition at the 1939 New York World's Fair.

Rice's artistic collaborators and influences included Pedro de Lemos, Elizabeth Norton, Roi Partridge, Gustave Baumann, Lorenzo P. Latimer, Norma Bassett Hall and the sisters Mary & Frances Gearhart.

Rice's work was featured in a one-man show at Villa Montalvo in Saratoga, California in 1959.

== Death and legacy ==
Rice died at his home in Oakland, California on 27 August 1963 at the age of 90. He is buried in his hometown at the Manheim Fairview Cemetery in Manheim, Pennsylvania.

=== Bibliography ===
Rice wrote two teaching texts, Block Printing in the Schools (1929) and Block Prints: How To Make Them (1941), both published by Bruce Publishing Company.

Rice is included in the book Artists in California 1786-1940 (1986) by Edan Milton Hughes.

His daughter, Roberta Rice Treseder, published a book in 2009, William S. Rice: California Block Prints which is a biography and includes images of his printmaking as well as woodblock printing methods and materials. And his granddaughter, Ellen Treseder Sexauer, wrote a book in 2015, William S. Rice, Art and Life.

=== Posthumous exhibitions ===
In 1978–1979, the Smithsonian American Art Museum held an exhibition called American Color Woodcuts: The Years of Transition, that featured the works of 40 artists including Rice.

In 2015 and 2016, "The Nature of William S. Rice: Arts and Crafts Painter and Printmaker" exhibition was released and travelled to the Crocker Art Museum and Pasadena Museum of California Art.

== Collections ==
Rice's works are in many public art collections including; California College of the Arts, National Museum of American Art, Boston Public Library, New York Public Library, California State Library, Library of Congress, Achenbach Foundation for the Graphic Arts, Elvehjem Museum, Oakland Museum of California, Two Red Roses Foundation, Fitzwilliam Museum, Fine Art Museums of San Francisco, Saint Mary's College of California Museum of Art, Indianapolis Museum of Art, and Hood Museum of Art at Dartmouth College.

== Awards ==
Rice won the "Best Print" award at the show of the California Society of Etchers in 1933.

== Exhibitions ==
This is a list of select art exhibitions of Rice.

- 1911 – Exhibition of California Artists, Hillside Club, Berkeley, California
- 1918 – Palace of Fine Arts, San Francisco, California
- 1939 – World's Fair, New York City, New York
- 1978-1979 – American Color Woodcuts: The Years of Transition, Smithsonian American Art Museum, Washington D.C.
- 2015 – The Nature of William S. Rice: Arts and Crafts Painter and Printmaker, Crocker Art Museum, Sacramento, California
- 2015-2016 – The Nature of William S. Rice: Arts and Crafts Painter and Printmaker, Pasadena Museum of California Art, Pasadena, California
