= Joseph Kleitsch =

American painter

- Born: June 6, 1882; Sânmihaiu Român, Hungary
- Died: November 16, 1931 (aged 49); Santa Ana, California, U.S.
- Known for: Paintings
- Style: Portrait; Plein air
- Movement: Impressionism

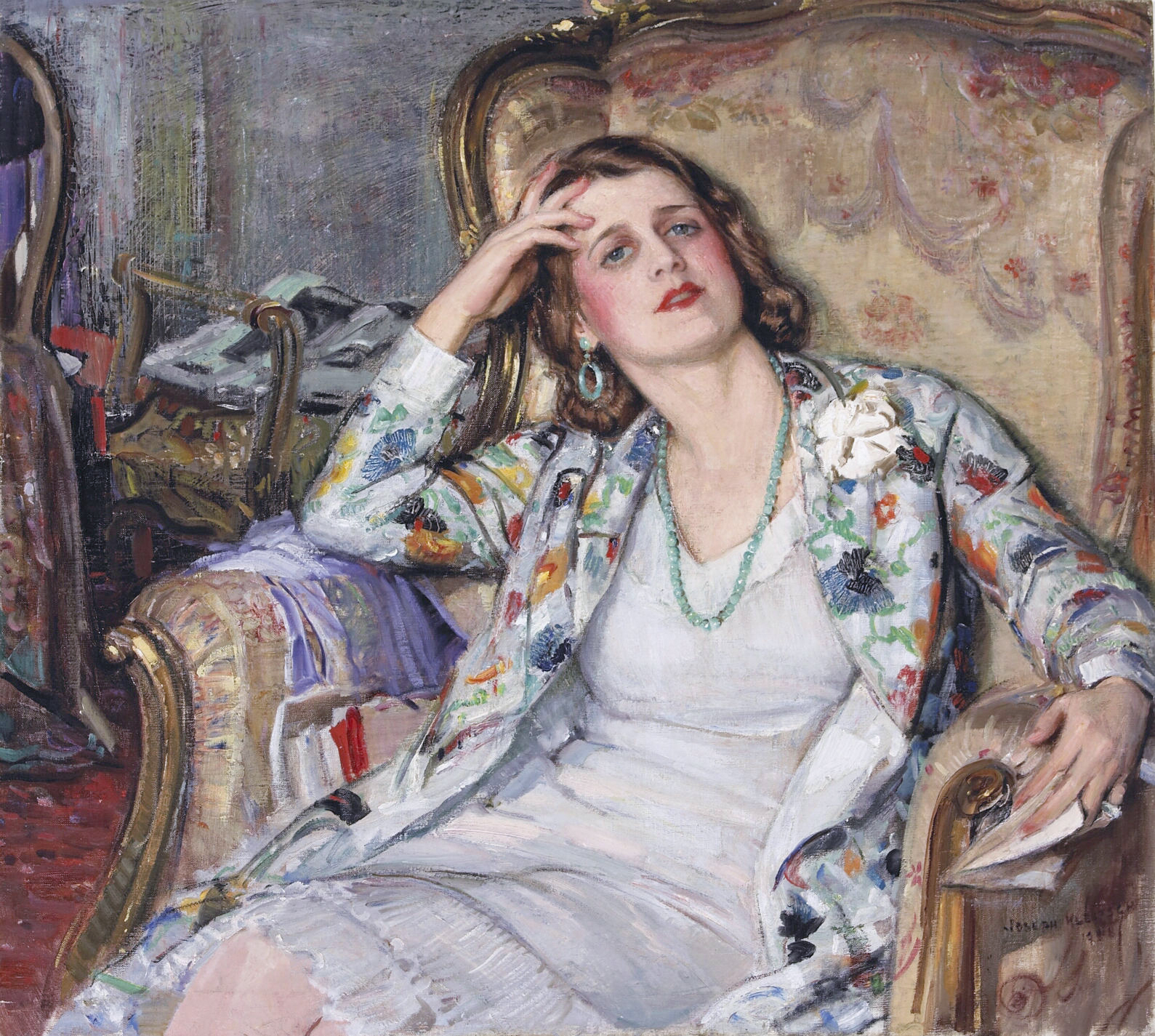
Ruth Renick (1928)

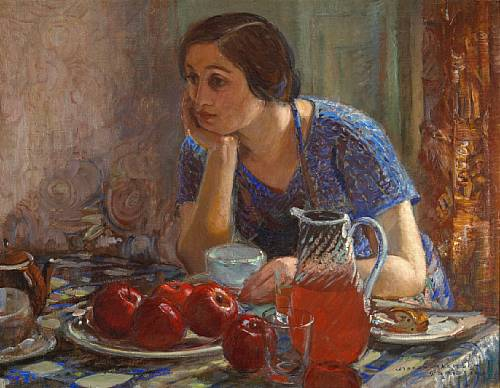
Madonna of the apples (1927)

Joseph Kleitsch (June 6, 1882 – November 16, 1931) was an ethnically German American portrait and plein air painter, born in the Banat region of Austria-Hungary, who holds a high place in the early California School of Impressionism.

== Biography ==
Born in the village of Sânmihaiu Român, old Hungarian province of Banat, now in Romania, on June 6, 1882, Kleitsch, an ethnic German, began painting at the age of seven. He later pursued art training in Budapest, Munich and Paris.

Kleitsch immigrated to the United States in 1912 and two years later, on July 22, 1914, he married Edna Gregatis of Chicago, Illinois with whom he would have his only child, Eugene. Influenced by his visits to the famous museums of Europe, Kleitsch continued with his love of portrait and figurative painting after relocating to California. There he rose to the challenge of capturing his new environment's brilliant light and diverse landscape. Kleitsch fell in love with the rustic artist village of Laguna Beach, moving there in 1920. Notable works depicted the town's eucalyptus lined streets, the crashing waves of the Pacific coastline and the nearby Mission San Juan Capistrano. Kleitsch became a significant resident of the Laguna Beach Artists Colony. In 1922, Arthur Millier of the Los Angeles Times was quoted saying of Kleitsch that "he was a born colorist; he seemed to play on canvas with the abandon of a gypsy violinist".

On November 16, 1931, at the age of forty-nine, Kleitsch died of a heart attack in front of the courthouse in Santa Ana, California. Two years after his death, Kleitsch's widow opened the Joseph Kleitsch Fine Arts Gallery in Laguna Beach.

== Professional memberships ==
- Chicago Society of Artists
- Laguna Beach Art Association
- Painters' & Sculptors' Club
- Palette & Chisel Club of Chicago.

== Galleries and museums ==
- Joseph Kleitsch Fine Art, Beverly Hills
- Irvine Museum, Irvine California,
- Crocker Art Museum, Sacramento, California,
- Pasadena Museum of California Art, Pasadena, California,
- Bowers Museum, Santa Ana, California,
- Fleischer Museum, Scottsdale, Arizona,
- Laguna Art Museum
- William A. Karges Fine Art

== Awards ==
- Gold Medal, Art Institute of Chicago 1914;
- Silver Medal, Painters' and Sculptors' Club;
- Grand Prize & Figure Prize, Laguna Beach Art Association
