= Willis E. Davis (painter) =

American artist (1855–1910)

- Born: 1855; Stockton, California
- Died: March 11, 1910 (aged 54–55); Atlantic Ocean
- Known for: Landscape painting

Willis Elphinstone Davis (1855 – March 11, 1910) was an American landscape painter known for the high prices his works commanded, and for his leadership of the Bohemian Club, the Mark Hopkins Institute of Art and the San Francisco Art Association. He made a career as a contractor in electrical engineering before he started painting, and he was also interested in commerce, serving as director of several firms.

== Early life ==
Davis was born in Stockton, California, the son of Isaac Elphinstone Davis, an engineer and miner from Massachusetts who became wealthy during the California Gold Rush not by mining gold but by manufacturing lime. Davis's mother was Sarah Adams, a young widow whose first husband died while on an engineering assignment in Hawaii. She married Isaac E. Davis in the early 1850s. The couple had four children: Willis, Gertrude (who later married F. W. Van Sicklen), Ethel (who later married Edward C. Hodges), and Horace who died in childhood. Davis's father was respected for his leadership and citizenship, having been a member of the San Francisco Committee of Vigilance, and the president of the Society of California Pioneers.

Davis traveled east to get his education at Massachusetts Institute of Technology (MIT). A member of the class of 1877, he graduated early in 1876 with a degree in science and literature, intending to go into the mining business.

== Career ==
Returning to California after college, Davis settled in San Francisco, taking residence among other well-to-do citizens in Pacific Heights at 2501 Scott Street. He established a business in electrical engineering at 211 Drumm Street in downtown San Francisco near the docks. Once a year at the end of May he administered entrance examinations to local MIT candidates. His electrical contracting business was successful, and his father hired him to help in the administration of the family lime business which was then operating as Davis & Cowell in Santa Cruz. He also served on the board of directors of the San Francisco Savings and Loan Society and the Edison Light and Power Company of San Francisco.

Retiring from the field of engineering, Davis began to paint landscapes for his own pleasure, caring little for the opinions of others.

Davis joined the Bohemian Club on June 30, 1892, and served on its board of directors from 1894. By 1904 he was the club's treasurer.

In 1900 Davis exhibited at the 4th Annual Bohemian Club Exhibition held at the clubhouse, a showing which displayed 224 canvases and 3 sculptures to the public, by invitation. In 1902 Davis spent a few weeks sketching scenery in the Sierras with his painter friend John Marshall Gamble. In December 1903 Davis brought four canvases to this annual event, gaining particular attention for his landscape titled Orange County Hills. In 1910, Davis's paintings were said by art writer Sophia P. Comstock to have brought record-breaking prices.

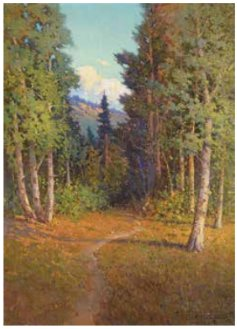
Davis painted this Lake Tahoe scenery beginning in mid-1906.

Davis served on the board of the San Francisco Art Association from 1900, and then as president beginning in 1902. He was serving as president when the Mark Hopkins Institute of Art was destroyed by the catastrophic fire following the 1906 San Francisco earthquake. All of the institute's records and many of its works of art were lost. Davis reported that the loss represented about $2 million from the original construction of the building as a grand residence for railroad magnate Mark Hopkins Jr, augmented by about $400,000 spent turning the mansion into an art school, plus an estimated $173,000 in lost artwork and other contents of the building. Davis quickly established a temporary office in Lower Pacific Heights near his own home, and he began the process of rallying support to finance the rebuilding of the institute. Davis spent the summer of 1906 resting at the Tahoe Tavern hotel and sketching in the Lake Tahoe area.

== Personal life ==
With his wife Elsie, Davis produced three children: daughters Edna and Sydney, and son Willis Elphinstone Davis Jr.

In February 1909 the San Francisco Call reported that Davis's daughter Edna had surprised everyone and eloped with a "young man of excellent family", San Francisco resident Pierre C. Moore. Sydney Davis told the newspaper that her sister and Moore had been longtime friends. Davis and his wife gave their blessing to the union when they were informed of it over the phone. Edna divorced him in September 1919, then in 1920 Moore was ejected from the Pacific-Union Club after he was sued by a club chambermaid for sexual assault.

Davis's wife, Elise "Elsie" Kohler Davis, died suddenly of stroke in Boston on October 4, 1909; a memorial service was held at the Davis home a week later. Davis and his wife had been preparing to travel Europe for his health, to be joined at some point by their daughter Sydney. Davis's health remained perilous after his wife's death, so he convinced his painter friend Gamble to accompany his travels. The two men visited Italy and France, making many sketches of people and places. Davis reported in February 1910 that he wanted to stay for a couple of months in Nice, and that he intended to visit Russia, Germany, Denmark and Great Britain before returning home at the end of 1910. However, he changed his mind and booked passage home on the ocean liner RMS Oceanic, bound for New York from Cherbourg. On March 11, 1910, in mid-voyage, Davis committed suicide by firing a heavy revolver at his head. One newspaper account said that Davis had long been suffering from neurasthenia, and that the suicide was the result of grief from losing his wife combined with increasingly poor health and a nervous breakdown. Davis left a sizable estate, worth more than $350,000. Davis's brother-in-law F. W. Van Sicklen met the ship and took his remains back to San Francisco.

Davis's son began competing in tennis in 1913, dropping "Junior" to be known simply as Willis E. Davis to the tennis world. Known for great speed in his serve, he rose to become the U.S. national champion on the clay court in 1916. The same year he took the U.S. national mixed doubles championship, teaming with Eleonora Sears. He retired seven years later.
