= John Marshall Gamble =

American painter (1863–1957)

- Born: 1863; New Jersey, U.S.
- Died: April 8, 1957 (aged 93–94); Santa Barbara, California, U.S.
- Education: San Francisco School of Design
- Occupation: Painter
- Known for: Landscape painting
- Movement: California Impressionism

John Marshall Gamble (1863 – April 8, 1957) was an American painter who focused on California landscapes and wildflowers. He relocated to Santa Barbara after his San Francisco studio was destroyed by the 1906 earthquake. He was an influential in the Santa Barbara art scene, being a teacher and School Board President of the Santa Barbara School of the Arts.

== Life and career ==
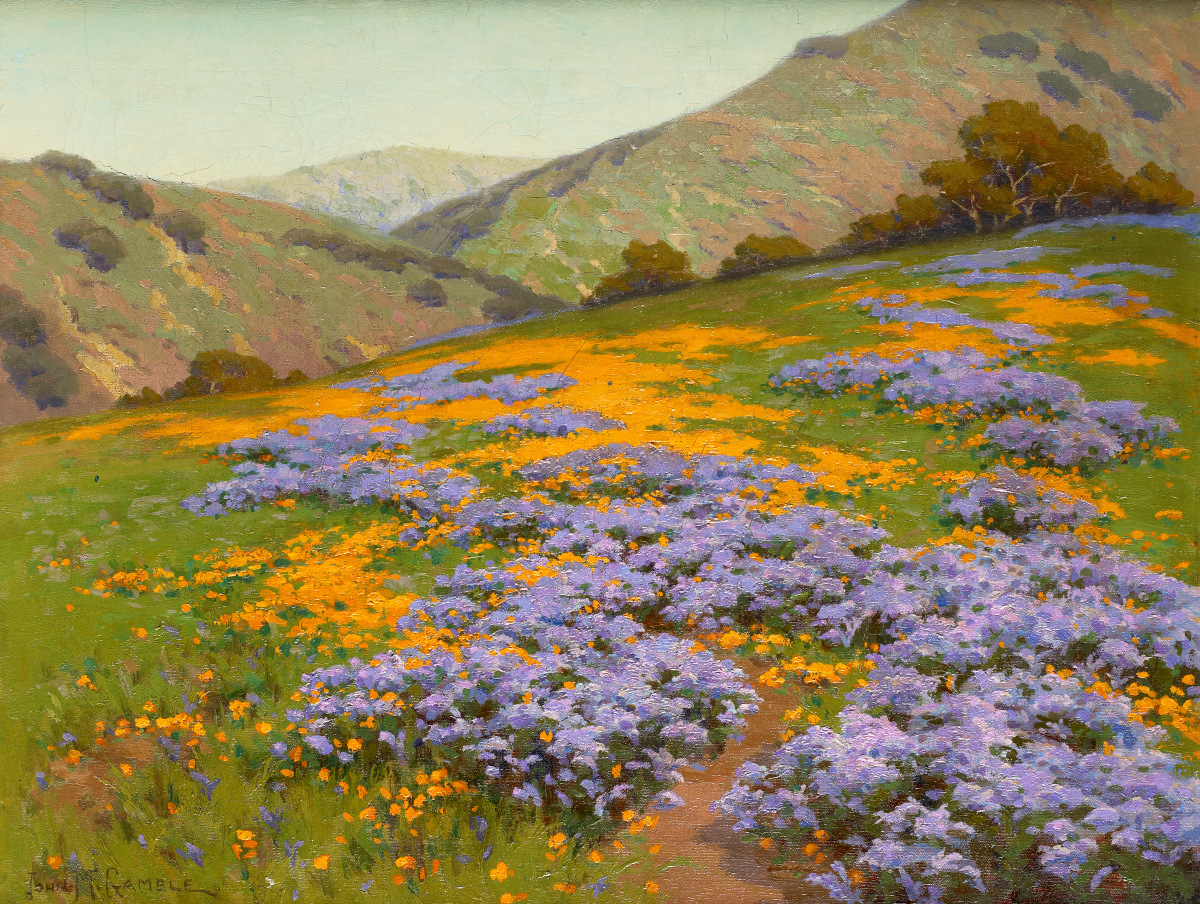
Wild Heliotrope and Poppies, San Francisco, between 1893 and 1906, Birmingham Museum of Art

John Marshall Gamble was born in New Jersey in 1863, moved to New Zealand with his family in his early years, and then to San Francisco in 1883. He was the grandson of US Marines Lieutenant Colonel John Marshall Gamble.

First studying the San Francisco School of Design under Virgil Macey Williams and Emil Carlson, he later went to the Académie Colarossi, and the Académie Julian in Paris, to study under Jean Paul Laurens and Jean-Joseph Benjamin-Constant. He first opened a studio in San Francisco which was destroyed in the 1906 earthquake, moving to Santa Barbara afterwards.

During his career he won several awards, such as a gold medal at the Alaska-Yukon-Pacific Exposition, in Seattle. Gamble is considered the "supreme painter of California's wildflowers", an "exhaustless theme which has won the artist enduring fame". The artist became a faculty member of the Santa Barbara School of the Arts in 1929, and later served as School Board President.

A friend of painter Willis E. Davies, Gamble accompanied him to plein air painting trips, and the 1910 European trip that ended with Davies' suicide on board of the White Star liner RMS Oceanic.

== Style and legacy ==
Gamble's had detailed knowledge of California's landscapes, and according to a contemporary critic "the distinguishing charm of these landscapes seems to lie in the intimate feeling for nature shown in the painting".

Gamble's painting Poppies and Lupine sold for US$178,500 in a 1998 Christie's auction. His work is represented by galleries such as Steven Stern Fine Arts, Los Angeles, William A. Karges Fine Art, and is part of the permanent collections of the Birmingham Museum of Art and the Fine Arts Museums of San Francisco, among others. Gamble was also influential as a teacher and mentor of younger artists, and was considered to be the "dean of Santa Barbara artists".

== Exhibitions ==
- Alaska-Yukon-Pacific Exposition, Seattle, 1909
- Solo exhibition, Kanst Gallery, Hollywood, 1911.
- Solo exhibition, Hotel Green Gallery, Pasadena, 1911.
- "California Artists, 1860-1930", McHenry Museum, Modesto, 1988.
