= Russell Chatham =

American landscape artist and author (1939–2019)

- Born: October 27, 1939; San Francisco, California, United States
- Died: November 10, 2019 (aged 80)
- Occupations: Landscape painter and author

Russell Chatham (October 27, 1939 – November 10, 2019) was a contemporary American landscape artist and author who spent most of his career living in Livingston, Montana. The artist was the grandson of landscape painter Gottardo Piazzoni, though he was essentially a self-taught artist. His work has been exhibited in over 400 one man shows and in museums and galleries over the last five decades. Art scribe Robert Hughes was among Chatham's collectors along with Paul Allen and actor Jack Nicholson.

== Early life and career ==
Chatham's parents were Russell Wilson Chatham (1906–1974) and Romy Charlotte Piazzoni (1908-1996). His great uncle was Luigi Piazzoni, a Swiss-born immigrant who came to upper Carmel Valley, California in the 19th-century along with his grandfather.

Chatham's work eschewed the narrative tendency of much western art and presented landscapes that stand in intimate relationship towards the human figure even in the absence of it. In the early 1980s Chatham began making lithographs and stood as one of the world's foremost practitioners of that craft.

In addition to lithography, Chatham also produced original oil paintings. His oil paintings currently sell for tens of thousands of dollars, and there was a multi-year waiting list for commissions, but according to his dealers, he preferred printing lithographs as the more challenging art form. (Longtime Livingston residents can recall a time when early in his career Chatham traded his canvases for essential services in a barter arrangement.) Despite being a print, Chatham's lithographs have little to do with modern process lithography, which always starts from a photograph and typically only uses four colors. His art lithographs may have 30 or 40 different layers of color, all of which have to be hand drawn on to the printing plate, and the colors selected for the final effect. To see some of the early proofs of one of his prints is to see a study in vivid and unusual colors from which it is almost impossible to conceive of the final subtle shadings and quiet colors.

In addition to his work as a painter, Chatham also authored several books. a series of short stories "Dark Waters" in which he detailed the exploits of his hunting friends, like the author Jim Harrison. The stories were Rabelaisian, vulgar, and exquisitely written (one suspects with a little help from his literary friends). William Hjortsberg disputed this during a presentation in Livingston on Livingston on December 9, 2008. "He is quite a good writer in his own right," Hjortsberg said. They center on hunting, fly fishing, food, wine and life changes. One story centers around preparing roast duck on an annual outing devoted solely to excess. In addition to "Dark Waters", Chatham authored several books about fly fishing.

Many of Chatham's painted works have adorned the covers of Harrison's works.

In 2011, Chatham moved from Livingston back to California. He had a studio in Marshall, California.

== Selected bibliography ==
- "Striped bass on the fly: a guide to California waters" (Examiner Special Projects, 1977) ISBN 978-0893950002
- "Russell Chatham" (Clark City Press, 1987) ISBN 978-0944439005
- "Silent Seasons: Twenty-one Fishing Stories" (Clark City Press, 1988) ISBN 978-0944439050
- "Dark Waters: Essays, Short Stories and Articles (Clark City Press, 1988) ISBN 978-0944439036
- "The Angler's Coast" (Clark City Press, revised, 1990) ISBN 978-0944439128
- "Russell Chatham: One Hundred Paintings" (Clark City Press, 1990) ISBN 978-0944439241
