= Frederick Meyer =

German-American academic administrator

1st President of School of the California Guild of Arts and Crafts
- In office 1907–1944
- Succeeded by: Spencer Macky

Personal details
- Born: Frederick Heinrich Wilhelm Meyer; November 6, 1872 near Hamelin, German Empire (now Lower Saxony, Germany)
- Died: January 6, 1961 (aged 88) Oakland, California, United States
- Spouse: Laetitia Summerville (m. 1902–?)
- Education: Prussian Academy of Arts; Pennsylvania Museum and School of Industrial Art
- Occupation: Founder of California College of the Arts, academic administrator, educator, furniture craftsmen

Frederick Heinrich Wilhelm Meyer (November 6, 1872 – January 6, 1961) was a German-born American designer, academic administrator, and art educator, who was prominent in the Arts and Crafts Movement. He was a long-time resident of the San Francisco Bay Area; and the founding president of the School of the California Guild of Arts and Crafts (now California College of the Arts).

== Early years ==
Meyer was born on November 6, 1872, near Hamelin, German Empire (now Lower Saxony, Germany), into a family whose occupations were dominated by furniture craftsmen and weavers. He apprenticed as a cabinetmaker before he immigrated in 1888 to Fresno, California, where he worked in a large commercial nursery.

In about 1890, he enrolled at the Cincinnati Technical School, and two years later transferred to the Pennsylvania Museum and School of Industrial Art.

On November 7, 1893, he became a naturalized citizen of the United States of America. In the spring of 1895 he traveled to Germany, completed the program at the Royal Academy of Berlin for Fine Arts and Mechanical Sciences (also known as the Prussian Academy of Arts), and returned to the Pennsylvania Museum and School, where he was awarded a master's degree.

== Career ==
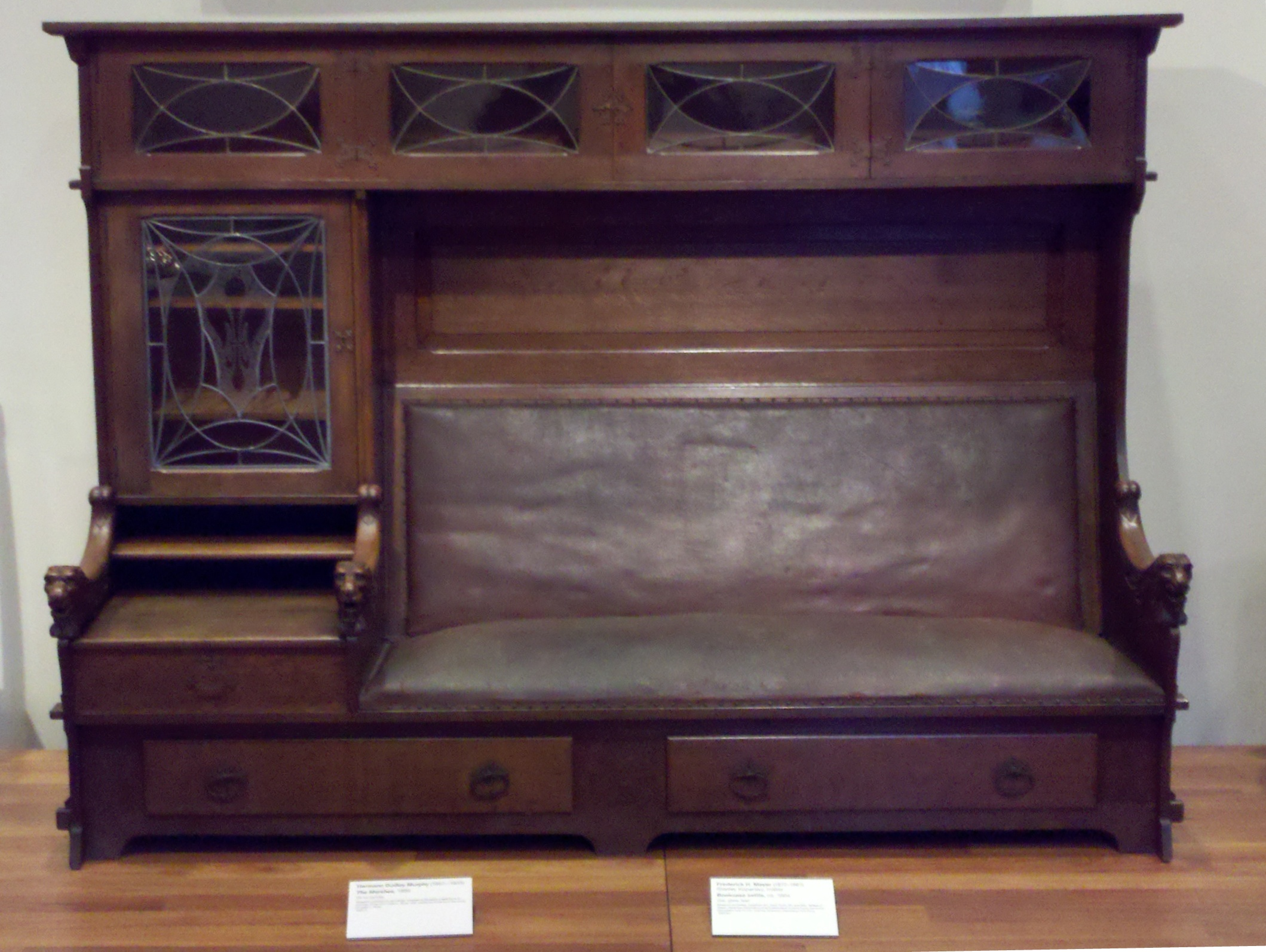
A bookcase settle designed by Frederick Meyer, on display at the DeYoung Museum in San Francisco

Between 1898 and 1902 Meyer held the post of Supervisor of Art for the public schools in Stockton, California. In 1900, he hired as assistant art supervisor William S. Rice, whom he had met in Pennsylvania; Rice was promoted to Meyer's job in 1902. Meyer and his wife relocated to Berkeley, California, in fall of 1902, where he was hired as an “Instructor of Descriptive Geometry” (i.e. mechanical drawing) at the University of California. A year later was appointed Professor of Applied Arts and head of the Department of Industrial Design at San Francisco's Mark Hopkins Institute of Art, which was administered by U.C. Berkeley. In addition, he opened the Craftsman's Shop in San Francisco and designed custom furniture for prestigious clients, including the: Phoebe Hearst estate at Wyntoon (in association with Bernard Maybeck), California Building at the 1904 Louisiana Purchase Exposition in St. Louis, Faculty Club at U.C. Berkeley, and Sequoia Club in San Francisco.

In October 1905 he was elected president of the California Guild of Arts and Crafts and his wife became its treasurer; they held both positions for two years. After the devastating San Francisco earthquake and fire in April 1906, which destroyed the Mark Hopkins Institute, he briefly traveled to Europe.

== Founding of California Guild of Arts and Crafts ==
Meyer expressed his dream of a school that would fuse the practical and ideal goals of craftsmen, designers, and artists, integrated into both theory and practice.

Meyer founded the School of the California Guild of Arts and Crafts in June 1907 with its first location in the Studio Building, one block from the U.C. Berkeley campus. He had just $45 USD in cash, access to three classrooms and 43 students.

The following year his school was renamed the California School of Arts and Crafts (CSAC) and briefly relocated to the space over a billiard parlor. In 1910, to accommodate the ever-expanding student body, the CSCA took over the campus of the former Berkeley High School building (or Commercial High School) at 2119 Allston Way (at Grove Street, now Martin Luther King Way), where they remained until their move in 1923–1924 to a larger facility in Oakland on Broadway.

The school was renamed the California College of Arts and Crafts (CCAC) in 1936. The school's name was changed for a fourth time in 2003 to the California College of the Arts (CCA). The school developed an international reputation because of Meyer's high standards and the renowned faculty that he hired, including Xavier Martinez, William S. Rice, Perham Wilhelm Nahl, Beniamino Bufano, Isabelle Clark Percy West, and Hamilton A. Wolf. Meyer became a popular figure though his many public lectures and sponsorship of exhibitions and charities. Meyer led the college until his retirement in 1944, when he was named president emeritus. He was succeeded as president by Spencer Macky.

== Personal life ==
In Stockton, California, Meyer met and married in June 1902, Laetitia Summerville from Boston. The couple relocated that fall to Berkeley, California.

Meyer died at the age of 88, on January 6, 1961, in Oakland.
