= Gottardo Piazzoni =

Swiss-American painter

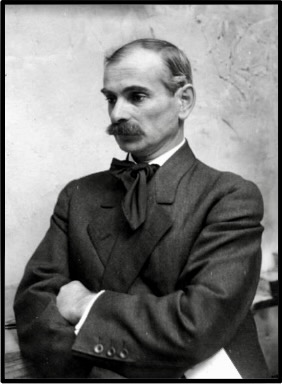
- Portrait of Gottardo in his San Francisco studio, c. 1925
- Born: Gottardo Fidele Piazzoni; April 14, 1872; Intragna, Ticino, Switzerland
- Died: August 1, 1945 (aged 73); Carmel Valley, California, U.S.
- Resting place: Cypress Lawn Memorial Park
- Education: San Francisco Art Institute
- Movement: California Tonalism
- Spouse: Beatrice Delmue

Gottardo Fidele Piazzoni (April 14, 1872 – August 1, 1945) was a Swiss-born American landscape painter, muralist and sculptor of Italian heritage, a key member of the school of Northern California artists in the early 1900s.

== Early life ==
Piazzoni was born on April 14, 1872, in Intragna, Ticino, Switzerland. He moved at the age of 15 to his father's dairy farm in the Carmel Valley. His uncle Luigi Piazzoni, had the Luigi Piazzoni ranch adjacent to his father's ranch. After training with Arthur Frank Mathews at the Mark Hopkins Institute of Art (later the San Francisco Art Institute), Piazzoni trained for three years in Paris at the Académie Julian and under Jean-Léon Gérôme. He then returned to California to begin his career and set up his own teaching studio.

Specializing in landscapes in a muted palette, most scholars count Piazzoni among the Tonalists, and was one of the most influential exponents of this style in California. He sought out the lighting effects of certain times of day, taking a "special interest in full moonrises, the viewing of which became a family ritual. Venturing up a hill, the family would cheer the appearance of the moon. Piazzoni knew the exact time for each moonrise and kept precise records." He was able to portray the essential qualities of a scene and achieve a strong mood, using only minimal descriptive details.

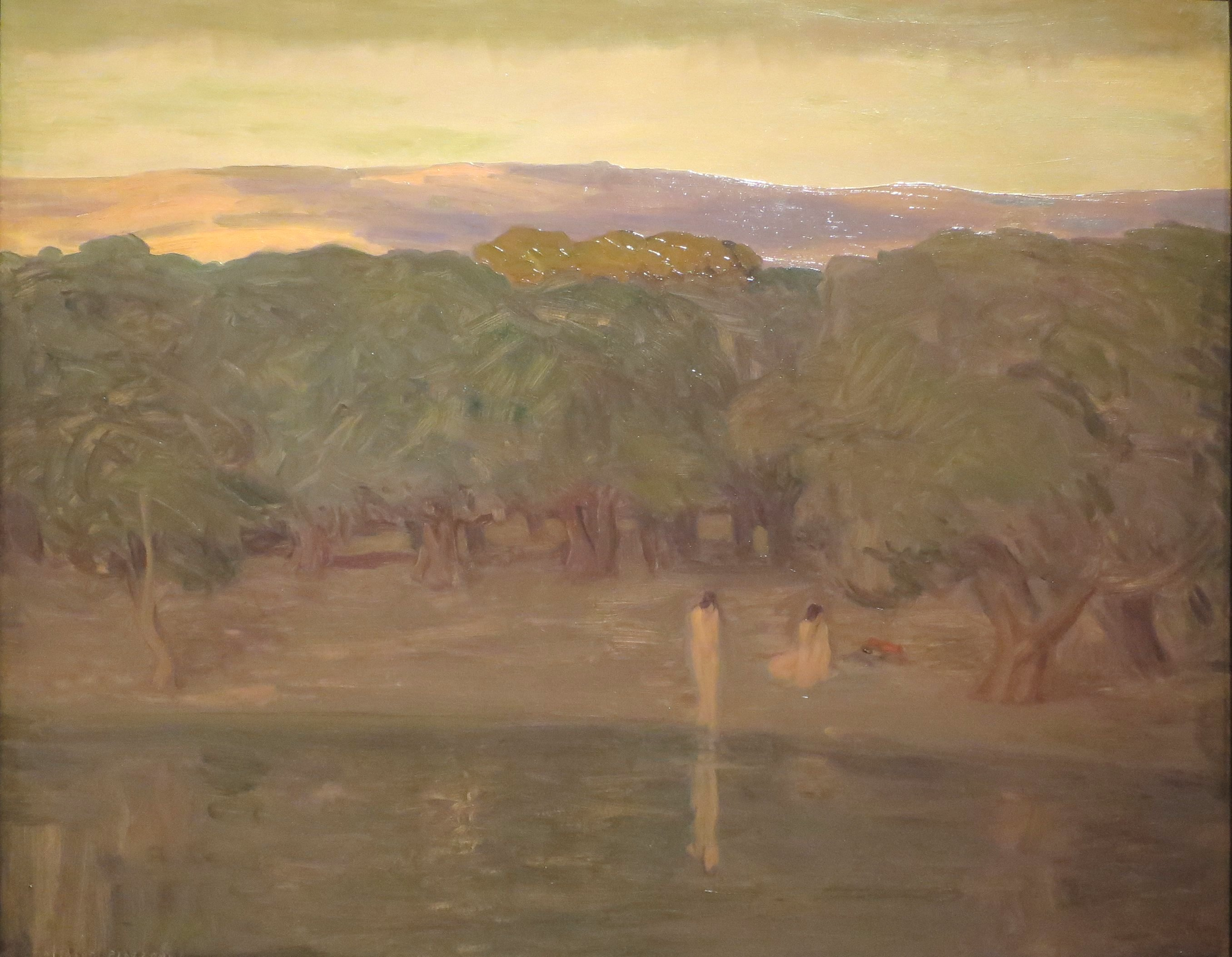
Silence, c. 1912, oil on panel, De Young Museum

Piazzoni's best-known public work may be his 14 murals for the former headquarters of the San Francisco Public Library for architect George W. Kelham, ten of them dating from 1932, the other four painted in 1945 and not installed until the 1970s. After public debate and lawsuits in the late 1990s, the ten principal murals can now be seen at the M. H. de Young Memorial Museum.

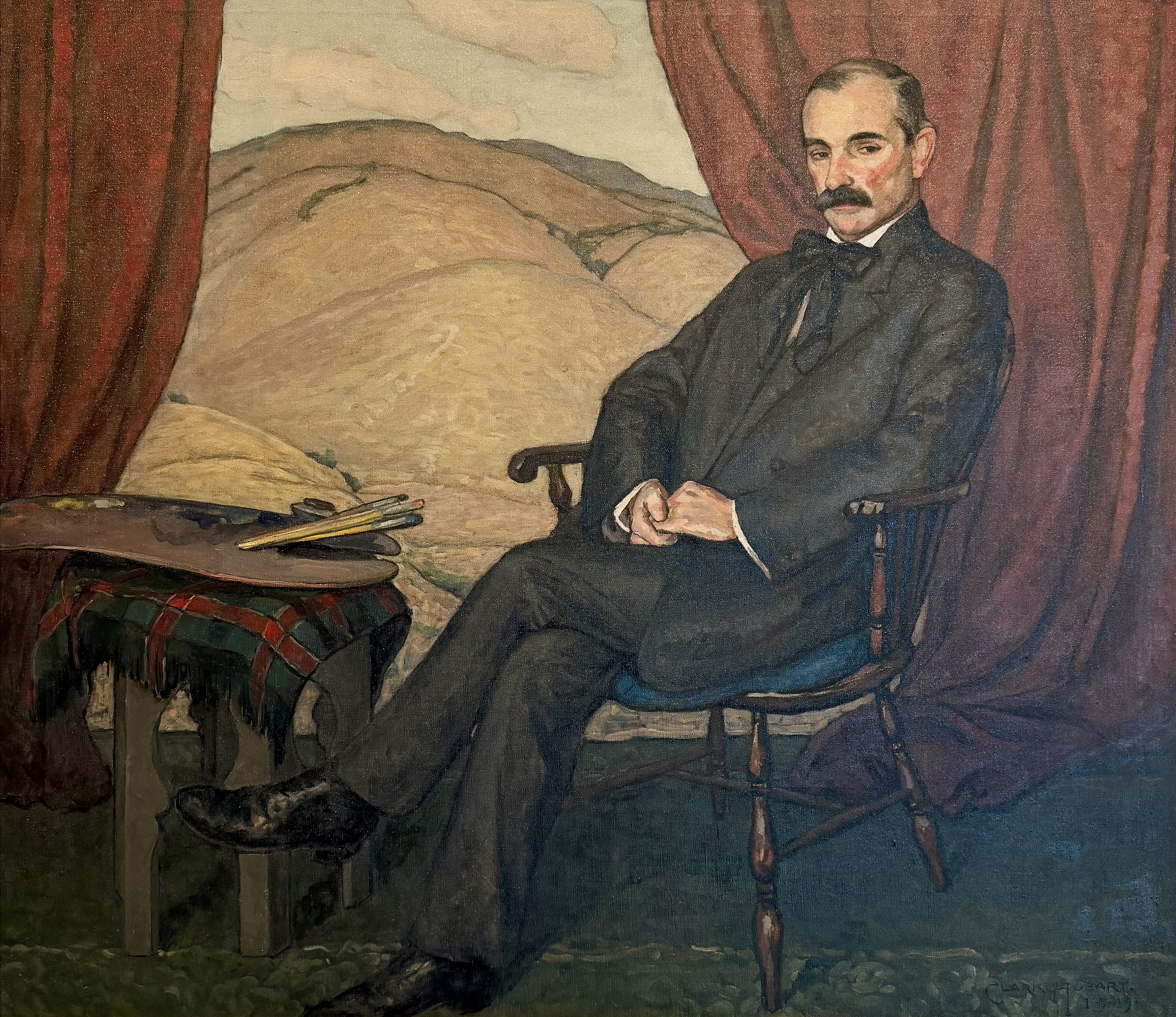
Portrait by Clark Hobart in 1919

By early 1901, Piazzoni was sharing a studio with fellow painter Xavier Martínez, with whom he founded a year later the short-lived California Society of Artists. He was also a co-founder of the California Society of Etchers in 1912, with Robert B. Harshe, art professor at Stanford University; Pedro Joseph de Lemos, professor at San Francisco Art Institute; and Ralph Stackpole, sculptor, printmaker, and at that time Piazzoni's studio assistant. He enthusiastically advanced the career of sculptor Arthur Putnam. He was also a member of the Bohemian Club, exhibited with the Berkeley and Monterey art colonies, taught at the San Francisco Art Institute, and served on the jury and advisory committee of the Art Gallery at the Hotel Del Monte. In 1927 he publicly protested when the directors of the municipal Oakland Art Gallery threatened to remove two displayed paintings of “explicit female nudes.”

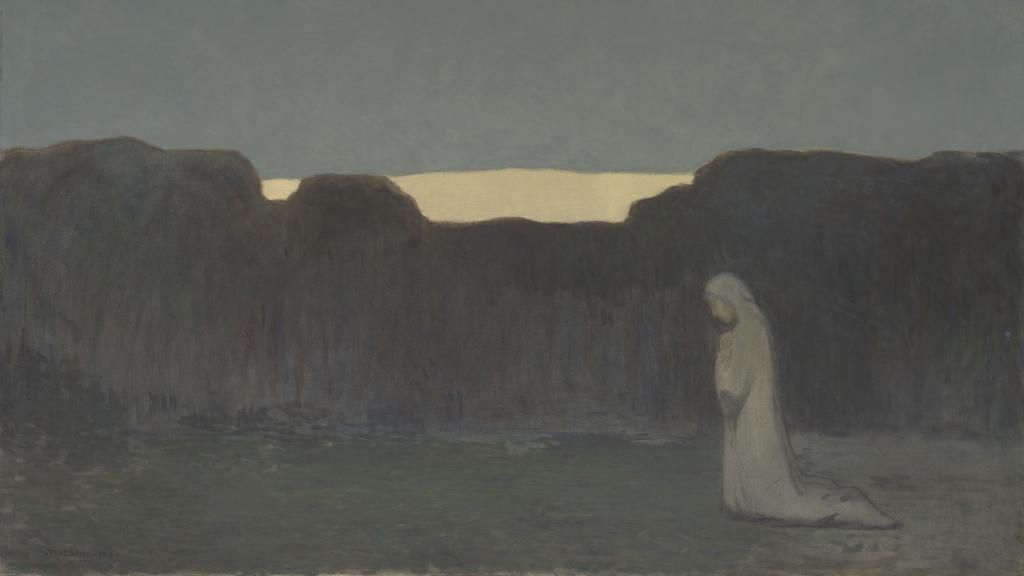
Lux Aeterna, 1914, oil on canvas, De Young Museum

Piazzoni was also a good friend of Impressionist Granville Redmond and introduced the Deaf artist to Charlie Chaplin. The relationship of Redmond, Chaplin and Piazzoni is explored in a play by Steve Hauk, "The Floating Hat," published by the Traditional Fine Art Organization, Inc. The play is also in the collection of the Gallaudet University library.

Among his students were George Post, Rinaldo Cuneo, Dorr Bothwell, and Clayton Sumner Price. American landscape painter Mireille Piazzoni Wood was Piazzoni's daughter, painter-writer Philip Wood his son-in-law. Artists Thomas Wood and Russell Chatham are Piazzoni grandsons.

== Death ==
Piazzoni died on August 1, 1945, at the Piazzoni ranch home in Carmel Valley. Services were held in San Francisco. Piazzoni was buried at the Cypress Lawn Memorial Park cemetery, in Colma, California.

== Works ==
- Paris (1900)
- Homes by the water (1901)
- Evening prayer (1901)
- My Sketch Class at Tiburon (1902)
- A bit of La Jolla's Bay (1903)
- Shore and Sea (1904)
- Landscape with a fisherman in a row boat (1906)
- Ile de la Jatte (1907)
- The Oaks (1909)
- Marin Hills (1910)
- Near Sausalito (1910)
- Mill Valley (1911)
- Silence (1912)
- Two trees (1912)
- Spring Hills & Clouds (1912)
- Boat near Beach (1913)
- Bather in a Stream with Hills Beyond (1914)
- Marin Hills from Exposition (1915)
- The Land (1915)
- The Sea (1915)
- Rolling Hills (1916)
- Tiburon (1916)
- Moon over Houseboat 1917)
- Clear Sky Over a Farm (1917)
- Tiburon (1917)
- Bridge in a landscape (1918)
- Cloud Over Dark Hills (1919)
- Stand of trees (1920)
- House in a landscape (1921)
- Trees in a summer landscape (1922)
- Pines (1924)
- The Soil (1925)
- Piazzoni Ranch (1926)
- Rolling hills and Forest Knolls (1927)
- Golden hills and shadows (1928)
- Coastal bluffs along a shore (1929)
- Carmel Valley landscape (1930)
- Piazzoni Ranch (1931)

== Murals ==
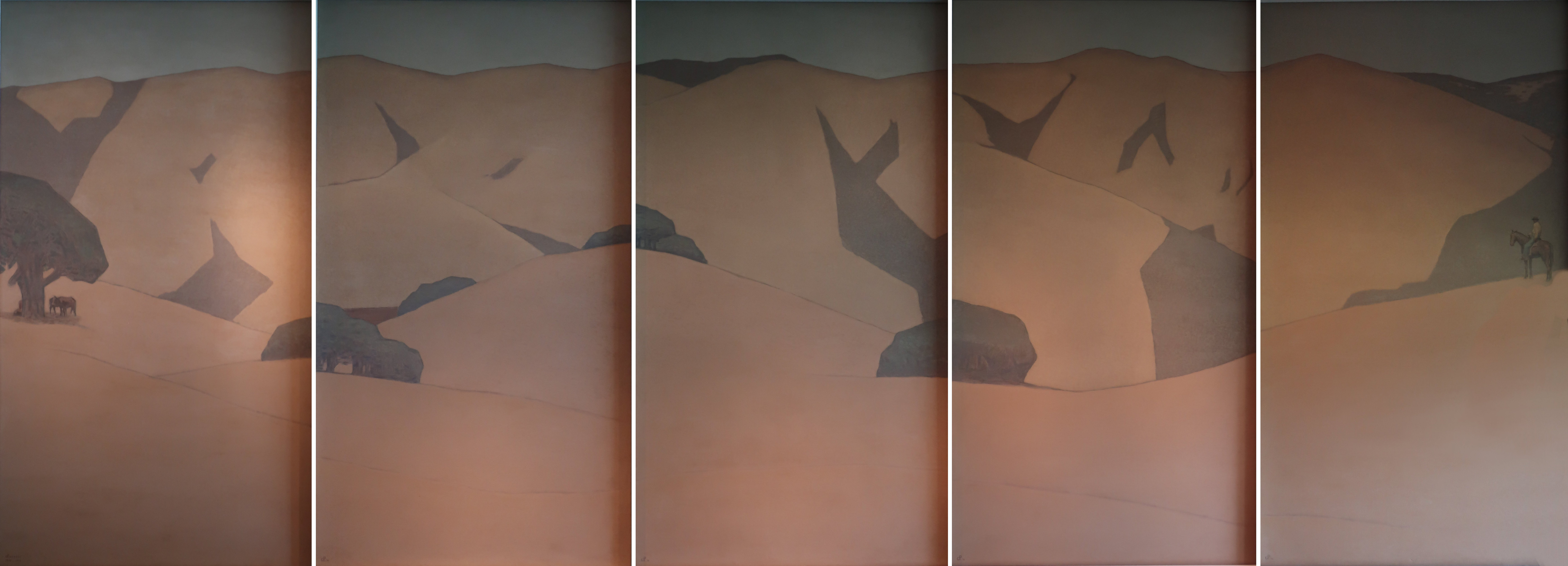
The Land by Gottardo F. P. Piazzoni, 1932, oil on canvas, five panels, 12 x 6 2/3 ft. each, De Young Museum

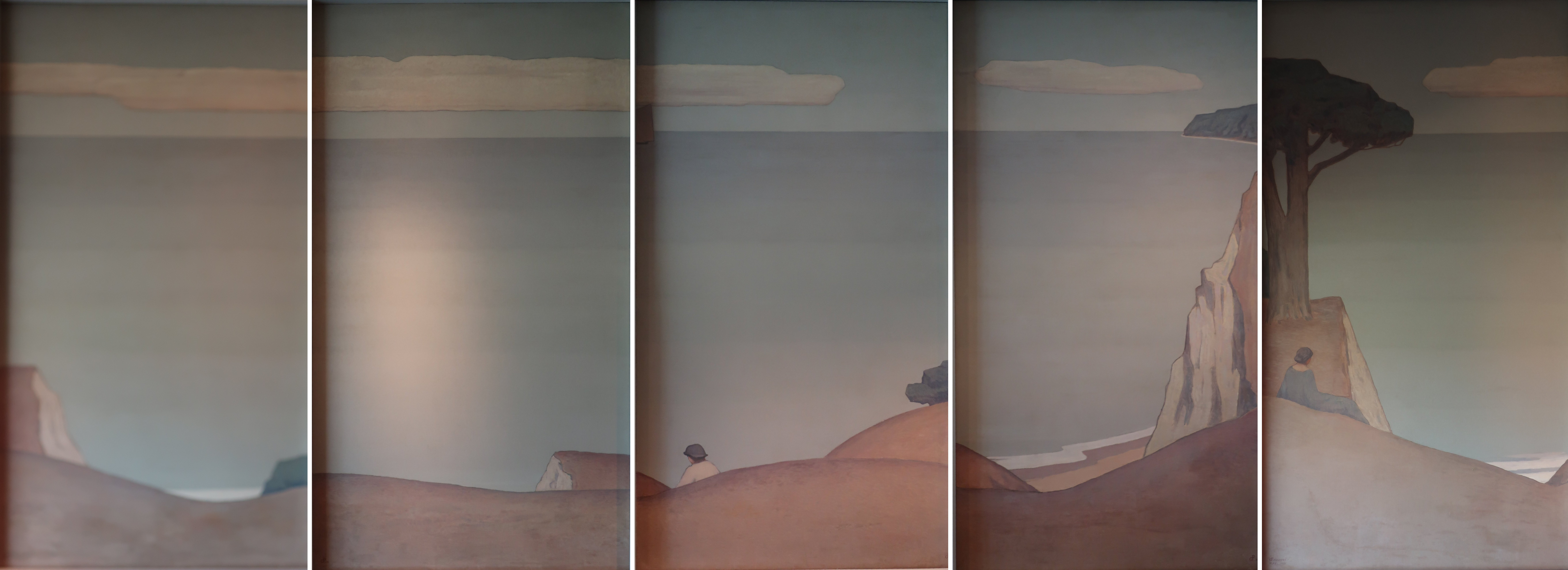
The Sea by Gottardo F. P. Piazzoni, 1931, oil on canvas, five panels, 12 x 6 2/3 ft. each, De Young Museum

== See also ==
- California Tonalism
