= Nell Walker Warner =

American painter

Nell Walker Warner Sholstrom
- Nell Walker Warner, from a 1946 newspaper
- Born: Nell Gertrude Walker; April 1, 1891; Falls City, Nebraska, U.S.
- Died: November 30, 1970 (aged 79); Carmel-by-the-Sea, California, U.S.
- Resting place: Forest Lawn Memorial Park, Glendale, California, U.S.
- Other name: Nell Shostrom
- Occupation: Artist

Nell Walker Warner (April 1, 1891 – November 30, 1970) was an American artist. Born in Nebraska, she was an oil painter in La Cañada Flintridge, California until she moved to Carmel-by-the-Sea in 1950. Her work is in the permanent collection of the Museum of Nebraska Art.

== Early life and education ==
Nell Gertrude Walker was born in Falls City, Nebraska, and raised in Colorado Springs, the daughter of William Thomas Walker and Ida Katherine Zoeller Walker. She graduated from Lexington College in Missouri in 1910. She pursued further training in art, graduating from the Los Angeles School of Art and Design in 1916. She studied with Nicolai Fechin and Paul Lauritz in the 1920s.

== Career ==
Warner was an oil painter, most often of landscape and floral still life subjects. She was a member of the California Art Club, the California Watercolor Society, Laguna Beach Art Association, Society of Western Artists, the Pasadena Society of Artists, the Carmel Art Association, and many other arts organizations. In 1946 she was elected president of the Women Painters of the West. In Los Angeles she was art curator for the Tuesday Afternoon Club, and worked at Walt Disney Studios. She wrote a book, How Nell Walker Warner Paints in Oils. She held solo shows in Palm Springs in 1941, and in Laguna Beach in 1942. In 1950, she held a one-woman show in Honolulu, to exhibit her paintings of Hawaiian flowers.

Warner's paintings met a receptive audience. "Her boat pictures make you feel you are at the water's edge and must hurry on or the boat will be gliding away into the clear waters," said one admirer in 1941. However, the Los Angeles Times critic in 1931 gave a mixed review, saying "Her effects are more pleasing in the general than in the particular."

== Personal life ==
In 1920, Warner married Bion Smith Warner, an osteopath who served in World War I. He died in 1937. She married a second time in 1945, to businessman Emil Shostrom. They lived in La Cañada, in a house she designed, before moving to Carmel in 1950. She died in 1970, at the age of 79, in Carmel-by-the-Sea.
