= Ross Dickinson =

American painter

- Born: 1903; Santa Ana, California, U.S.
- Died: 1978 (aged 74–75); La Jolla, California, U.S.
- Occupation: Painter

Ross Dickinson (1903-1978) was an American painter. His work is in the permanent collection of the Smithsonian American Art Museum.
