= Lexington College =

Catholic women's college in Chicago (1977–2014)

Coordinates: 41.877413°N 87.649735°W

- Former name: Lexington Institute of Hospitality Careers
- Type: Private women's college
- Active: 1977–2014
- Accreditation: Higher Learning Commission
- Religious affiliation: Roman Catholic
- Location: Chicago, Illinois, United States

Lexington College was a Catholic women's college from 1977 to 2014 in Chicago, Illinois, United States. The Illinois Board of Higher Education serves as the custodian of records for the college following its closure.

The curriculum was focused entirely on hospitality management studies. Originally known as the Lexington Institute of Hospitality Careers, the college opened in 1977 and closed in 2014.

== History ==
Lexington was founded in 1977 by three Chicago-area laywomen – Helen Healy, Nancy McCormack, and Ann Jans – who were inspired by their affiliation with Opus Dei. Before his death in 1973, Opus Dei founder Josemaría Escrivá had encouraged them to start a U.S.-based program to train women in hospitality. The school was the US' only women-only hospitality program.

Lexington was originally named the Lexington Institute of Hospitality Careers, in honor of the street upon which its first campus, in Chicago's West Side, was located. In 1993, it received accreditation from The Higher Learning Commission, and in 1995, the name changed to Lexington College. By 1998, the college was based at a small campus in Morgan Park that offered three classrooms, one dormitory, a one-room library, a bookstore, and a chapel to serve its approximately 50 students. By 2003, Lexington had moved to the West Loop and shared a building with an Opus Dei tutoring center. By 2010, it was located in Greektown.

In May 2014, the president of Lexington College posted a message on the college website announcing the closure of the college at the end of the academic year. After Lexington's articles of incorporation were dissolved, all of the transcripts of its students were transferred to the Illinois Board of Higher Education (IBHE). Students who had been studying in the bachelor's degree program were eligible to transfer to Kendall College or Roosevelt University to complete their degrees.

The Illinois Board of Higher Education serves as the custodian of records for the college following the its closure.

== Affiliation ==
Lexington was affiliated with Opus Dei. Opus Dei referred to Lexington as "a corporate work of Opus Dei," with a "philosophy of education...inspired by the social teachings of the Catholic Church."

Lexington College itself objected to media descriptions of it being an Opus Dei-run institution, saying that the college represented diverse viewpoints and that descriptions of it being Opus Dei-operated were "not accurate." They acknowledged having members of Opus Dei on its staff and board (including an Opus Dei chaplain), and working the organization's teachings into the curriculum, but said the college was "inspired by the social teachings of the Catholic Church" as opposed to Opus Dei specifically and that they did not require students to be Catholic. In John L. Allen Jr.'s book Opus Dei, Lexington's president said that about 20 students had become numeraries between 1977 and 2005, suggesting that the college was not intended as an Opus Dei recruiting tool.

The Princeton Review and the College Board, two national clearinghouses for information on U.S. higher education institutions, described the college as being affiliated with the Roman Catholic Church.

== Academic and student life ==
The founders wanted Lexington to focus on guiding women towards professional careers while being introduced to the teachings of Escrivá and practicing service to others. In addition to hospitality training, students took courses in liberal arts, with an emphasis on ethical and religious teachings. Accounting, literature, and housekeeping were all taught, as was a course called "Good News of the Bible," taught by the Opus Dei regional vicar. An Opus Dei mass was offered daily. Other topics of instruction included the history, presentation, and etiquette of afternoon tea; table manners; holiday dining; and children's dining. Students were required to complete externships during their second year of enrollment. The student body size was kept small to provide more focused education and training.

The college was noted for its diversity, starting with a group of Hispanic women in 1977 and by the turn of the 21st century ranking seventh nationally among all women's colleges for its percentage of Black students. In 2007, the College Board reported that Lexington was a Hispanic-serving institution, with a student body that was 44% Black/Non-Hispanic, 39% Hispanic, 11% White/Non-Hispanic, and 6% Non-Resident Alien. That same year, it was the smallest institution in Illinois to offer Bachelor's degrees, with 56 students.

Lexington followed an open admissions process, admitting any student who had attained at least a 2.0 GPA in high school and submitted an admission essay and high school transcript. 200 students were reported to pass through each year.

All students graduating from Lexington received either the Bachelor of Applied Science or the Associate of Applied Science. Students could major in Hospitality Management with a concentration in culinary arts, hotel/restaurant management, event planning, or health care and wellness. Students had to complete one (A.A.S.) or two (B.A.S.) internships while attending Lexington to receive their degrees.
