= Opus Dei (book) =

2005 book by John L. Allen Jr.

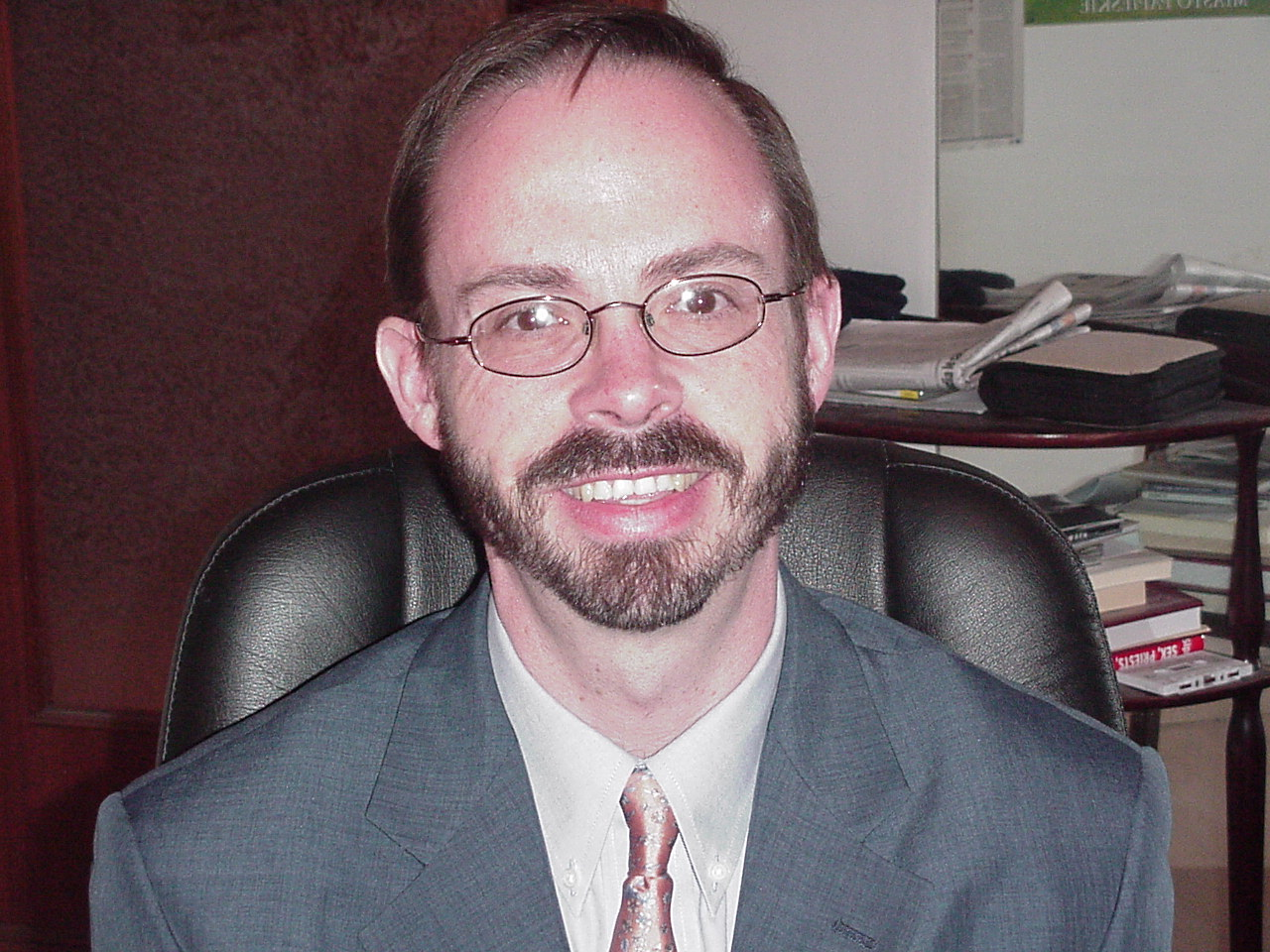
John L. Allen Jr., the author of the book

Opus Dei: An Objective Look Behind the Myths and Reality of the Most Controversial Force in the Catholic Church is a book written by American journalist John L. Allen Jr. about the Prelature of the Holy Cross and Opus Dei, commonly known as Opus Dei, published in 2005. While the book received mixed reviews, there were more positive reviews than negative. Two journalists referred to it as "widely considered as the definitive book on Opus Dei." On the other hand, some said Allen "applied a daub of whitewash." Agenzia Giornalistica Italiana (AGI), a major Italian news agency, described his work as having an "empirical approach" and that his book is of "great historical and journalistic interest."

== Reviews ==
Although a writer with some liberal leanings, being a regular contributor to the National Catholic Reporter, John L. Allen Jr. was praised for his work by both members and ex-members, by conservatives and liberals.

His harshest critic was Damian Thompson of The Catholic Herald, who, after saying that his "column is a byword for objectivity", said that Allen "applied a daub of whitewash", because Allen did not interview the senior critic of Opus Dei in Britain, Vladimir Felzmann. Allen later said that he did spend much space in the book analyzing Felzmann's statements versus the testimonies of other people. (See Opus Dei and politics). Thompson also said that Allen only saw what Opus Dei showed him. Thompson agreed with Allen though in several points: "Opus Dei is not as black as it is painted," Escriva "anticipated the reforming spirit of the Second Vatican Council," "there is nothing very shocking" about the survival of corporal mortification," and that charges that Opus Dei is "financially corrupt and politically far to the Right," are "years out of date." Another critic is Peter McDermott who still called Allen "respected Rome correspondent." His main point is that Allen "doesn't explore the idea that maybe Opus Dei itself is two different realities." Peter Duffy of the Jesuit weekly, America, also called him "respected" but said that Allen bent over backwards to explain the harshest criticisms of Opus Dei. Another writer for America, the Jesuit priest James Martin, after also calling Allen respected, described that book as "exhaustively researched and wholly fascinating exploration of the worldwide organization. Its chief surprise for many readers may have been the author’s detailed and sensitively drawn portrait of the extensive network of social apostolates sponsored by 'The Work,' which has often been criticized for its elitism."

Two journalists called it "widely considered the definitive book" on Opus Dei. One is Martha Teichner of CBS, a four-time Emmy award winner, and the other is Mary Nersessian of CTV.ca News Staff. Piers Paul Read of the Telegraph called Allen's work on Opus Dei "a dispassionate assessment...definitive, persuasive and absorbing." The Sunday Times said it is "An admirable book the first stop for anyone interested in Opus Dei." Time Magazine called it a "most informed and sympathetic" account of Opus Dei. Ed Dobeas of Amazon.com said it contained "exhaustive research, interviews and careful analysis," and is a "balanced, perceptive inquiry," while Publishers Weekly said it is a "most informative...exhaustive study," and that Allen's "balanced, even reporting sometimes borders on the clinical." Fr. Richard John Neuhaus said it is "a candid and careful assessment of what Opus Dei is and isn’t." Christopher Howse says it is a "determinedly unsensationalist but deeply intriguing study." Joe Szimhart says: "What he put in should go a long way to explain many facets of the Escrivà movement in Catholicism." Paul Baumann of Washington Monthly states: "has earned a reputation for balanced, informed reporting. He does not simply reflect the leanings of the liberal weekly paper that is his primary outlet. Here, that reputation gives credence to much of what Opus Dei members tell him in defending the group's philosophy and practices. In that sense, Allen may be too liberal for his own good."

Agenzia Giornalistica Italiana (AGI), a major Italian news agency, described his work as having an "empirical approach" and that his book is of "great historical and journalistic interest."

== Allen's recommendations ==
While Allen's main conclusion is that most of the criticism against Opus Dei are myths created by its opponents or are mainly due to misunderstanding Opus Dei, he also had a list of recommendations for Opus Dei.

To improve its image, Allen recommended that Opus Dei should (1) be more transparent, (2) collaborate with religious orders, and (3) its members should air out in public their criticism of the institution.

However, in "Let There Be Light - A look inside the hidden world of Opus Dei" (Washington Monthly October/November 2005), Paul Baumann says that Allen's recommendations, which are based on a liberal and Anglo-Saxon cultural prism, still constitute a misinterpretation of Opus Dei's identity.
