= Jessie Arms Botke =

American painter

- Born: May 27, 1883; Chicago, Illinois, United States
- Died: October 2, 1971 (aged 88)
- Education: School of the Art Institute of Chicago
- Style: Painting
- Movement: California Impressionism
- Spouse: Cornelis Botke (m. 1915)
- Children: 1

Jessie Hazel Arms Botke (May 27, 1883 – October 2, 1971) was an American painter in Illinois and California, noted for her bird images and use of gold leaf highlights.

== Biography ==
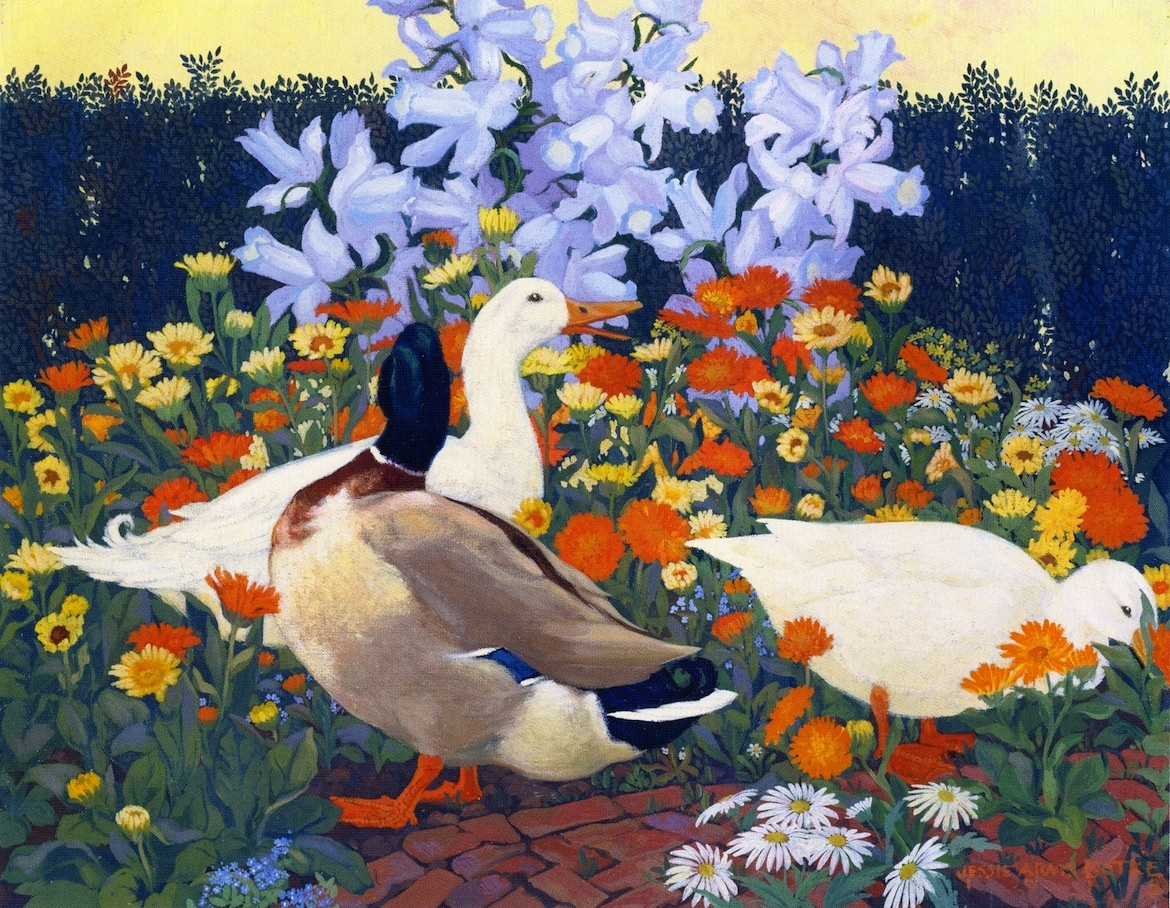
Ducks, Jessie Arms Botke

Jessie Arms Botke was born in Chicago, Illinois to William Aldis and Martha (Cornell) Arms. She attended the Chicago Art Institute in 1897 to 1898, and again from 1902 to 1905. She took summer classes from artists John Christen Johansen and Charles Herbert Woodbury and continued working with the renowned Albert Herter, who had the most influence in shaping her approach to composition and color. Following a short trip to Europe in 1909, she returned to her parents Chicago residence and officially listed her profession as “artist, interior decorating.” She worked as a muralist in New York City (1911) and in San Francisco (1913-14).

She married Cornelis Botke in April 1915 and gave birth a year later to their only child, William. She and her husband moved to Carmel-by-the-Sea, California, in 1919 and became influential figures in the local art colony. Her husband taught at the Carmel Arts and Crafts Club for the 1921 and 1922 seasons, where she and her husband exhibited their paintings at the Arts and Crafts Hall in Carmel. They moved to Santa Paula, California, in 1927.

During her career she was a prolific exhibitor. She was an exhibitor and secretary of the California Art Club. She ran her family's ranch at Wheeler Canyon in Santa Paula, California, while continuing to paint.

== Artwork ==
Inspired by early work as a designer of woven tapestries, Botke's art often featured birds, particularly white peacocks, geese and cockatoos. Later in her career, she moved from oils to watercolors, and also focused on still life painting.

Botke exhibited regularly throughout the United States during her lifetime. Her work has also been exhibited posthumously at the Irvine Museum and the Museum of Ventura County.

== Death ==
Botke died on October 2, 1971, in Santa Paula at the age of 88. An outdoor memorial service was scheduled at a courtyard fountain adjacent to Citizen's State Bank in Santa Paula. Works by Botke and her late husband were displayed in the bank after the service.

== Exhibitions and awards ==
- 1917 – Chicago Art Institute, Englewood Woman’s Club Prize
- 1918 – Chicago Art Institute, Martin B. Cahn Prize
- 1919 – Exhibition of Chicago Artists Annual, Chicago Artists’ Medal
- 1920 – Chicago Art Institute, William O. Thompson Prize
- 1920-1923 – Annual and Holiday Exhibitions of the Carmel Arts and Crafts Club
- 1921 - Milwaukee Art Institute (with Cornelius)
- 1921 - Crocker Art Gallery in Sacramento (with Cornelius)
- 1922 (January) – Exhibition of California Women Painters, Stanford University Art Gallery
- 1922 (April) – Exhibition of Carmel and Monterey Artists, Stanford University Art Gallery
- 1922 – Chicago Art Institute Annual
- 1925 – National Association of Women Painters & Sculptors in New York, Honorable Mention
- 1925–1945 – Grand Central Galleries in New York City
- 1926 – Exhibition of Chicago Artists Annual, First Prize ($500.00)
- 1926 – Del Monte Art Gallery (Monterey, California)
- 1926 – Traveling Exhibition (with Cornelius) of Western and Midwestern Museums
- 1926 – Hotel San Carlos Art Gallery (Monterey, California)
- 1926–1927 – Carmel Art Gallery, Carmel-by-the-Sea, California
- 1927 – Stendahl Galleries of Los Angeles (with Cornelius)
- 1933 – National Association of Women Painters & Sculptors in New York, Tucker Prize
- 1933 – Statewide Annual of the Santa Cruz Art League
- 1935 – First Annual Exhibition of the Academy of Western Painters, unspecified prize
