= Cornelis Botke =

American painter

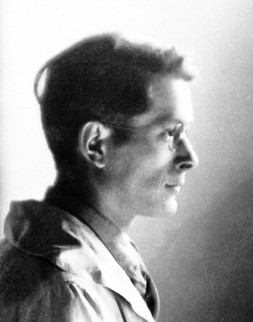
- Born: 1887; Leeuwarden, The Netherlands
- Died: 1954 (aged 66–67); Santa Paula, California, U.S.
- Occupations: Painter, etcher
- Spouse: Jessie Arms Botke
- Children: 1 son

Cornelis Botke (1887-1954) was a Dutch-born American painter and etcher. He emigrated to the United States in 1930, and he first lived in Chicago before moving to Southern California. By the time of his death, his artwork hung in the New York Public Library, the Los Angeles Public Library, and the California State Library. His wife, Jessie Arms Botke, was also an artist.

== Early life ==
Botke was born in Leeuwarden, Holland. He studied at the School for Applied Design in Haarlem, Holland, and the Chicago Art Institute. Botke married Jessie Arms in April 1915 and moved to Carmel-by-the-Sea, California in 1919 and became influential figures in the local art colony.

== Professional life ==
Botke taught at the Carmel Arts and Crafts Club for 1921 and 1922 seasons, where his painting, A Forest Of Eucalyptus, was on the Carmel Summer School Of Art 1922 brochure. He also acted in plays at the Carmel Arts and Crafts Theater and exhibited his paintings at the 1922 and 1924 annual exhibitions of paintings at the Arts and Crafts Hall in Carmel.

He was a member of the American Society of Etchers, the Society of American Graphic Artists, and the California Watercolor Society.

He and his wife moved to Santa Paula, California in 1927.

== Permanent collections ==
His etchings are in the permanent collections (but not all currently on view) of the Smithsonian American Art Museum, the National Gallery of Art, the San Francisco Museum of Modern Art, the Los Angeles County Museum of Art, the Santa Paula Art Museum, the Modern Art Museum of Fort Worth, the Wichita Art Museum, and the University of Michigan Museum of Art.

== Death ==
Botke died on September 16, 1954, at age 67, in Santa Paula, California. Memorial services were conducted at the Loma Vista chapel of the Mayr funeral home in Ventura, California.
