= Florence Lundborg =

Illustrator and painter

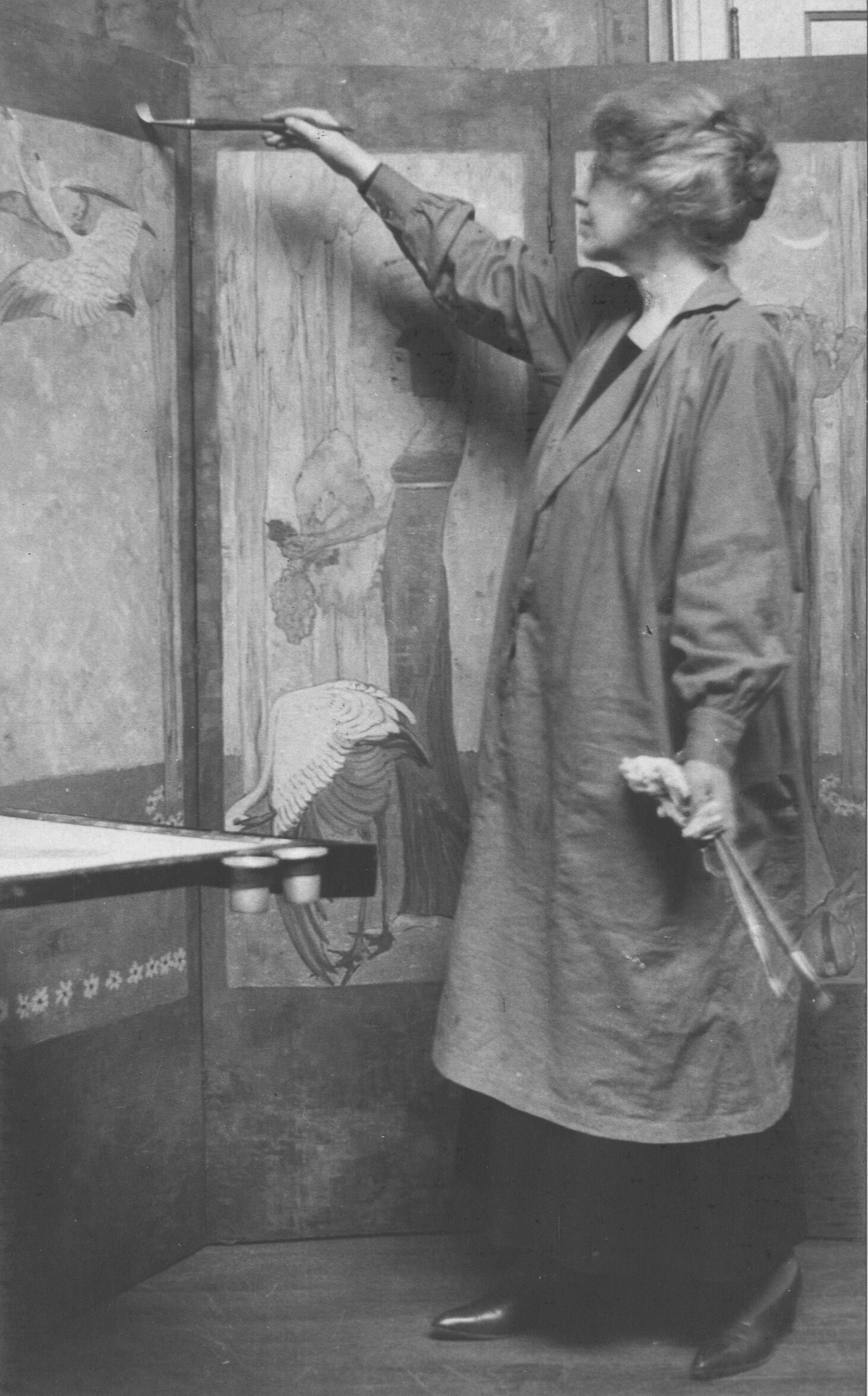
- Lundborg c. 1917
- Born: San Francisco, California, US
- Died: January 18, 1949; New York City, US
- Occupation: Painter

Florence Lundborg (1871 – January 18, 1949) was an American illustrator, poster artist, and painter known for her book illustrations and wartime paintings.

She was a member, with Gelett Burgess, of the San Francisco group "Les Jeunes", who published The Lark in the 1890s; Lundborg designed some of the covers.

Lundborg spent the winter of 1899-1900 studying in Paris with James Abbott McNeill Whistler. She had previously studied in San Francisco with Arthur Mathews at the California School of Design.

She was a co-founder and early member of the Book Club of California. Her murals were in the Tea Room of the California Building at the Panama Pacific International Exposition. She received a bronze medal for oil painting at the exposition. She received commissions to paint murals in private homes in Portland, Chicago, New York and San Francisco.

In 1909 she traveled through Europe with fellow artist and book designer Belle McMurtry. From 1915 to 1917 Lundborg and McMurtry shared a studio in the Studio Building on Post Street, San Francisco. They moved together to New York in June 1917. After moving to New York, Lundborg began to illustrate books and became known for her illustrations of “The Rubaiyat”, “Yosemite Legends” and “Odes and Sonnets”. Once in New York, she also began to paint murals and received a large commission for her allegorical mural "Quest for Knowledge" installed at Curtis High School in Staten Island in 1933. The mural was conserved and restored in 1999.

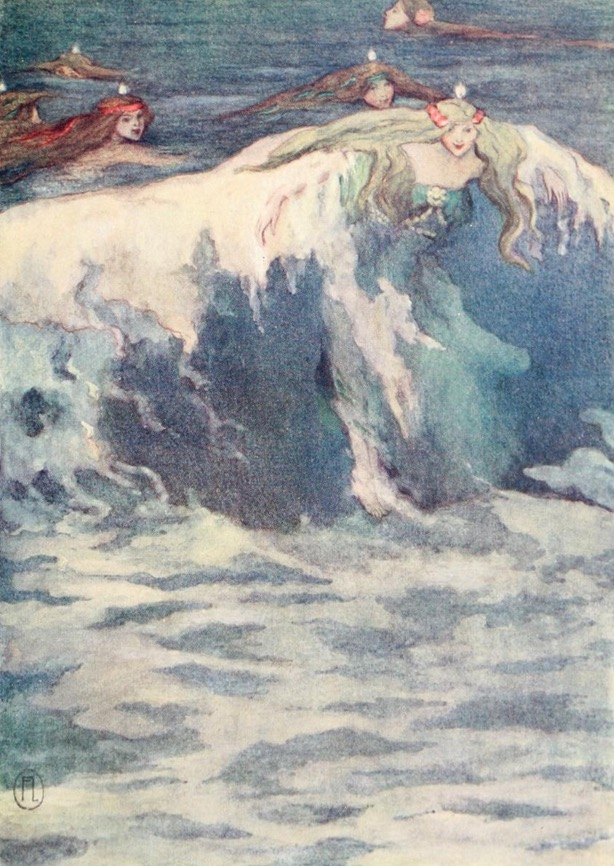
Nixies, from Honey-bee

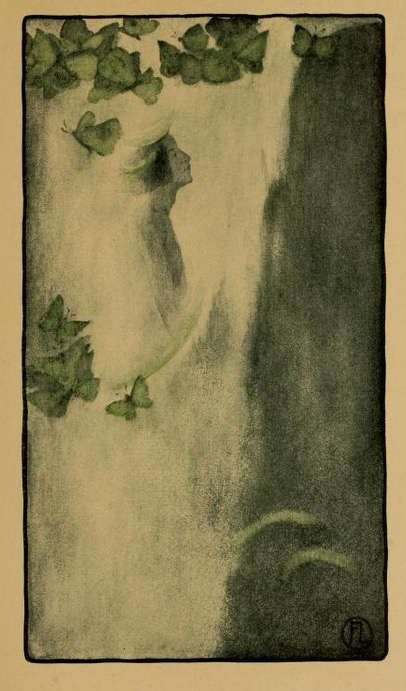
Illustration from Yosemite legends

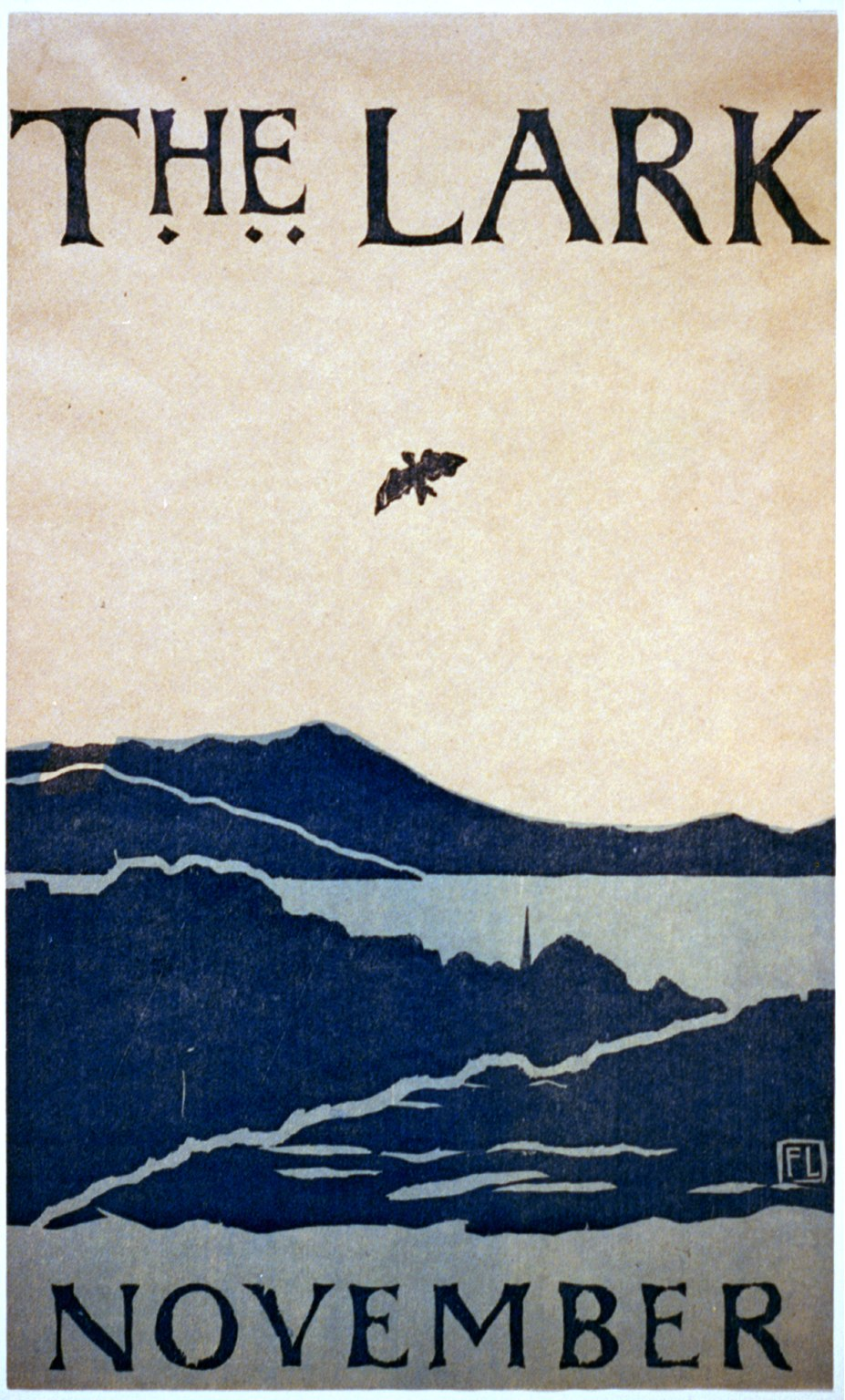
Cover from The Lark, 1895

== Bibliography ==
- Rubáiyát of Omar Khayyám: the astronomer-poet of Persia (c. 1900)
- A great part : and other stories of the stage by George Henry Payne (1902)
- Yosemite legends by Bertha Smith (1904)
- Honey-bee by Anatole France (1911)
- Odes and Sonnets by Clark Ashton Smith (1918)
