= Clark Hobart =

American painter and printmaker (1868–1948)

- Born: 1868; Rockford, Illinois, U.S.
- Died: February 23, 1948 (aged 79–80); Napa, California, U.S.
- Resting place: Los Gatos Cemetery, Los Gatos, California, U.S.
- Education: Mark Hopkins Institute of Art; Art Students League of New York
- Occupations: Painter, printmaker
- Known for: Color monotypes, California landscapes
- Spouse: Mary Young

Clark Hobart (1868 – February 23, 1948) was an American painter and printmaker active chiefly in Northern California. He is best known for the color monotypes he produced in the 1910s, for which he received a silver medal at the Panama-Pacific International Exposition in San Francisco in 1915, and for Impressionist landscapes of the Monterey Peninsula.

== Early life and training ==
Hobart was born in Rockford, Illinois, in 1868, though the place of birth is not recorded consistently: standard artist reference works give Rockford, while his death record states Seattle, Washington. He moved to California with his family as a child and spent most of his life in the state.

He studied in San Francisco at the School of Design, later the Mark Hopkins Institute of Art, under John A. Stanton and Giuseppe Cadenasso, and received private instruction from William Keith. He continued his training in New York at the Art Students League under Robert Frederick Blum and George Bridgman, and afterwards spent about three years in Paris. On returning to the United States he worked in New York City as an art editor for the Burr McIntosh Monthly.

== Career ==
Hobart returned to California in 1911 and settled for several years at Monterey, painting the coast and landscape of the Monterey Peninsula. He exhibited at the Hotel Del Monte gallery in Monterey in 1913 and at the San Francisco Museum of Fine Arts in 1914.

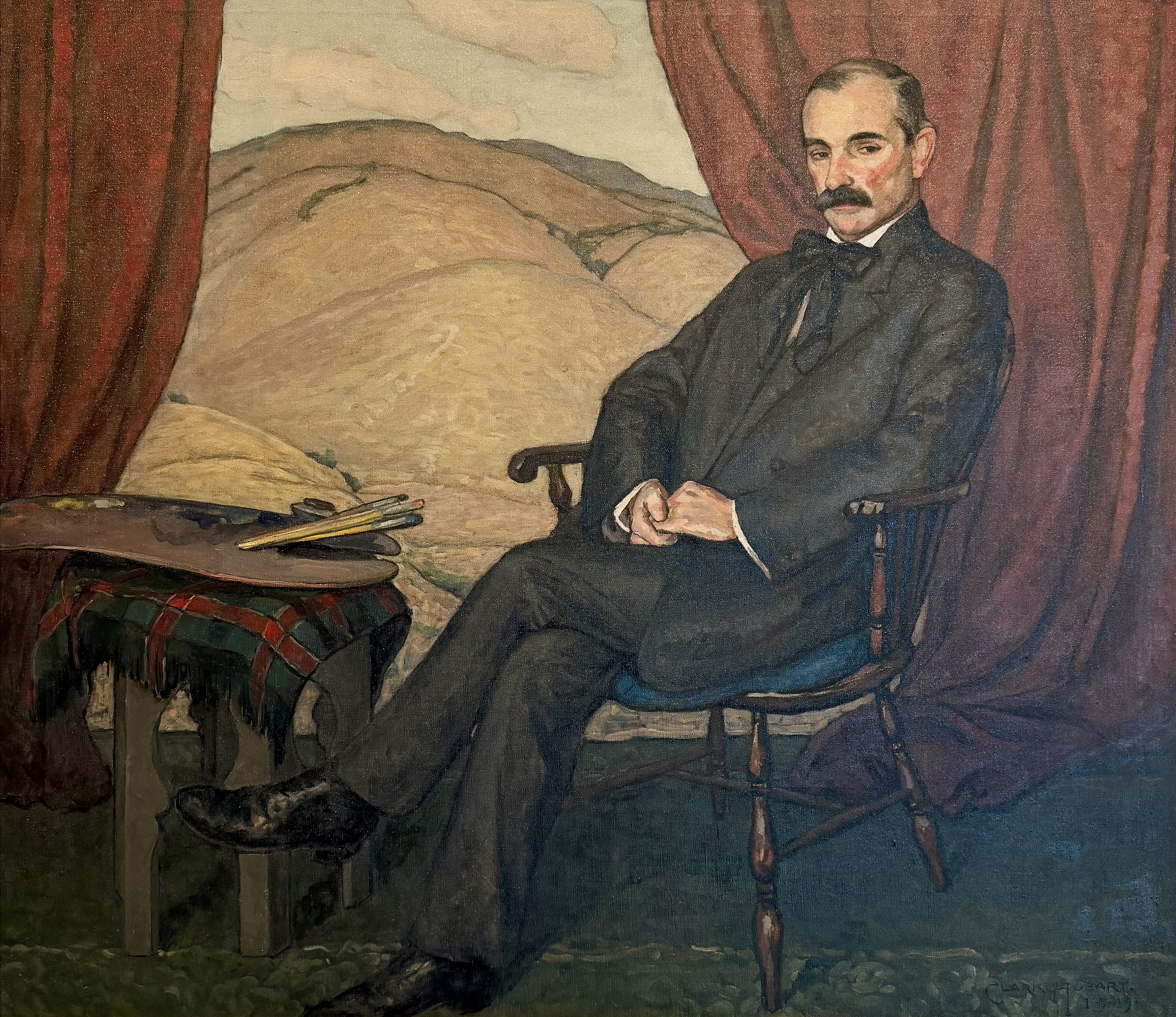
Portrait of Gottardo Piazzoni, 1919

At the 1915 Panama-Pacific International Exposition he showed the oil painting The Blue Bay, Monterey together with about a dozen monotypes, and was awarded a silver medal for the prints. Critics of the period compared his landscapes to those of Paul Cézanne. The exposition led to invitations to exhibit at the annual exhibition of the Pennsylvania Academy of the Fine Arts and at the Los Angeles Museum of History, Science and Art later in 1915, and at the Kennedy Gallery and the National Academy of Design in New York in 1916. In 1916 the Oakland Art Gallery devoted a room to his monotypes during its inaugural exhibition.

Hobart moved his studio to San Francisco in 1916, where he built a portrait practice while continuing to paint landscapes. He was a member of the San Francisco Art Association, the California Society of Etchers and the Bohemian Club, and received prizes from the San Francisco Art Association in 1918, 1920 and 1922. The Bohemian Club mounted a retrospective of his work in 1923.

== Later life ==
Hobart married Mary Young, head of the art department at San Francisco's Mission High School, and in 1923 the couple opened an interior decorating business. According to the Crocker Art Museum, the venture was successful enough that he was able to paint independently of sales for the rest of his life. He continued to work and lived in various parts of the San Francisco Bay Area until his death in Napa on February 23, 1948. He was buried at Los Gatos Cemetery in Los Gatos, California.

== Work ==
Hobart worked in oil, watercolor and etching, but his reputation rests largely on his color monotypes, a medium that attracted renewed interest among American artists in the early twentieth century. His subjects included coastal and woodland landscapes, decorative figure groups and portraits.

His largest surviving painting, A Dream of California (c. 1915), is a triptych in oil measuring 60 by 76 inches (152 by 193 cm) in the collection of the Crocker Art Museum. The museum describes it as a loose allegory set in a California landscape, with three female figures representing stages of a woman's life presented in idealized terms.

The Blue Bay: Monterey was included in Jewel City: Art from San Francisco's Panama-Pacific International Exposition, the centenary exhibition held at the de Young Museum in 2015–2016.

== Collections ==
Hobart's work is held by the Fine Arts Museums of San Francisco, the Crocker Art Museum, the Oakland Museum of California, the San Francisco Museum of Art, the Monterey Museum of Art and the Mills College Art Museum.
