= Siegriest =

Siegriest is a surname. Notable people with the surname include:

- Louis Siegriest (1899–1989), American painter
- Lundy Siegriest (1925–1985), American painter

== See also ==
- Siegrist
