= Ruvolo =

Ruvolo is an Italian surname. Notable people with the surname include:

- Felix Ruvolo (1912–1992), American painter
- Giovanni Ruvolo (born 1966), Italian biologist and politician
- Peter H. Ruvolo (1895–1943), American lawyer and politician
