= Saint Mary's College Museum of Art =

Museum in California, US

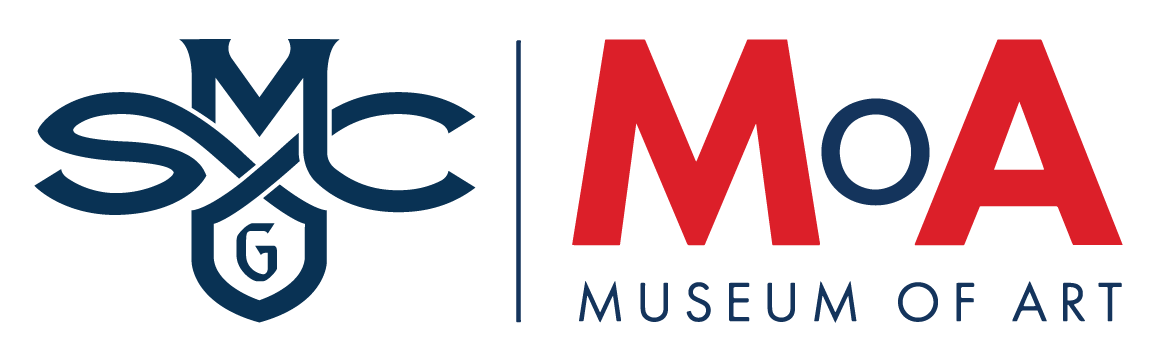
- Former name: William Keith Gallery; Hearst Art Gallery
- Established: 1934
- Location: Brother Cornelius Art Center; Saint Mary's College; 1928 St Mary's Road; Moraga, California 94575
- Coordinates: 37°50′29″N 122°06′33″W
- Type: Art Museum, Ethnographic Museum
- Accreditation: American Alliance of Museums
- Key holdings: William Keith Collection
- Collection size: 5000
- Owner: Saint Mary's College of California
- Website: www.stmarys-ca.edu/museum-art

Saint Mary's College Museum of Art (SMCMoA) is an art and ethnographic museum located on the campus of Saint Mary's College of California, a private Catholic college in Moraga, California, established in 1863 and administered by the De La Salle Brothers. The museum owns the largest collection of paintings by California landscape artist William Keith (1838–1911). The museum is a member of the North American Reciprocal Museum Association (NARM) and is accredited by the American Alliance of Museums.

== History ==
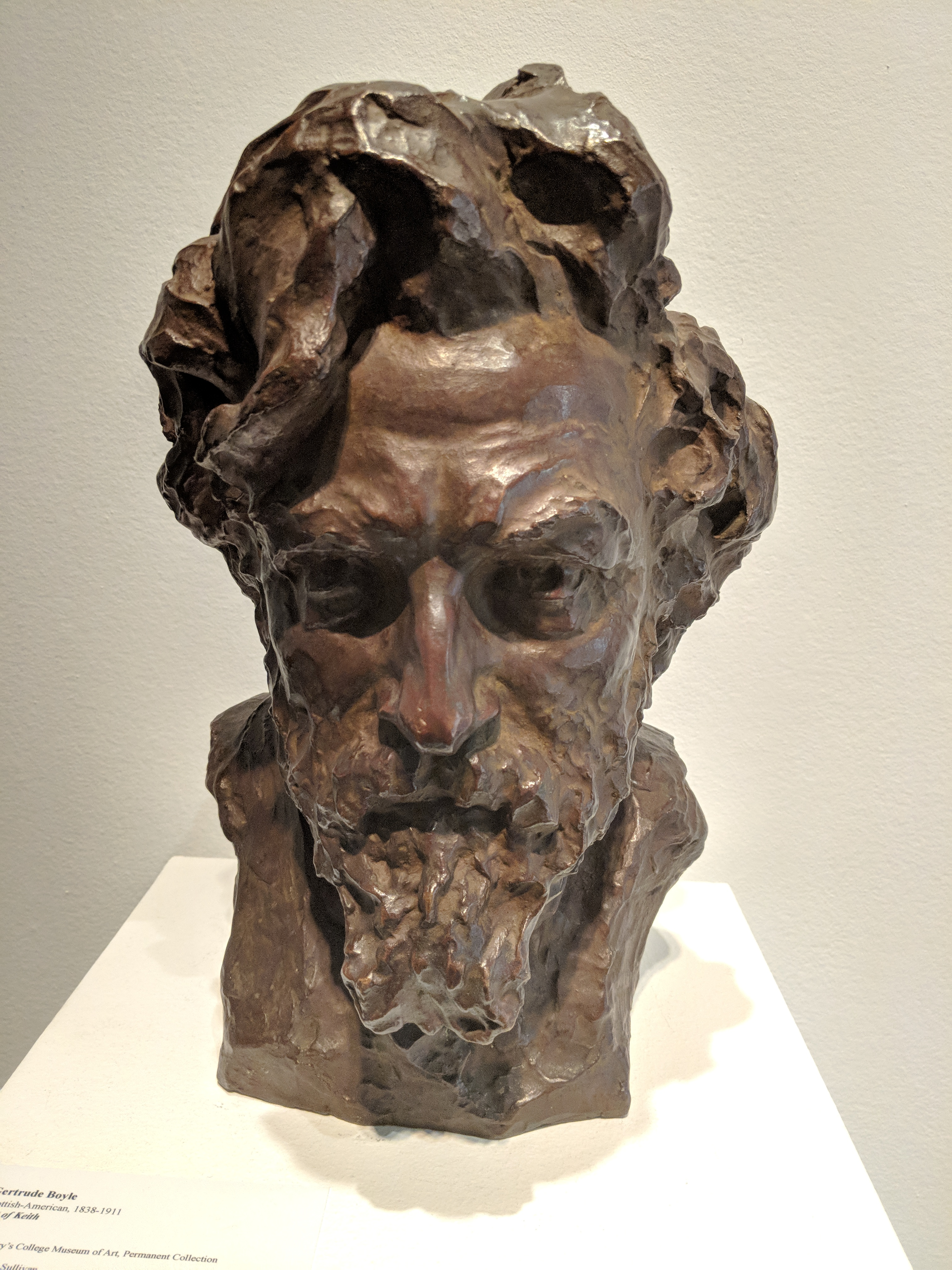
Gertrude Boyle Kanno, Bust of William Keith, 1904. SMCMoA collection. Photo by Jim Heaphy.

The first museum on the Saint Mary's College of California campus was the William Keith Gallery, founded by professor Brother Fidelis Cornelius Braeg in 1934. The gallery exhibited an extensive collection of paintings by William Keith, a California landscape artist and friend of John Muir. Brother Cornelius wrote a 900-page, two-volume biography of Keith, working closely with the artist's widow, Mary McHenry Keith, a lawyer and social justice advocate known for her work in the women's suffrage and animal rights movements.

In 1977, the museum reopened as the Hearst Art Gallery, after an expansion funded by the Hearst Art Foundation. Exhibitions included ethnographic materials and artwork of California and the American West.

In 2011, after another expansion, the gallery was renamed Saint Maryʼs College Museum of Art (SMCMoA). The renovated museum's inaugural exhibition was The Comprehensive Keith: A Centennial Tribute, marking 100 years since the death of William Keith.

== Collections ==
The permanent collection comprises more than 5,000 objects, many of which are grouped in special collections. Pre-eminent among these is the William Keith Collection, the most comprehensive collection of the artist's work, with over 200 objects, including paintings and archival materials.

The California Collection includes works from the 19th century to the present day with a special focus on artists of the San Francisco Bay Area and Northern California, including works by Morris Graves, Helen Hyde, Gregory Kondos, Maurice Logan, Roi Partridge, Louis Siegriest, Raimonds Staprans, Wayne Thiebaud, and Frank Van Sloun. The Alberti Collection of European prints and works on paper includes works by Marc Chagall, Pablo Picasso, Henri de Toulouse-Lautrec, Henri Matisse, and Käthe Kollwitz

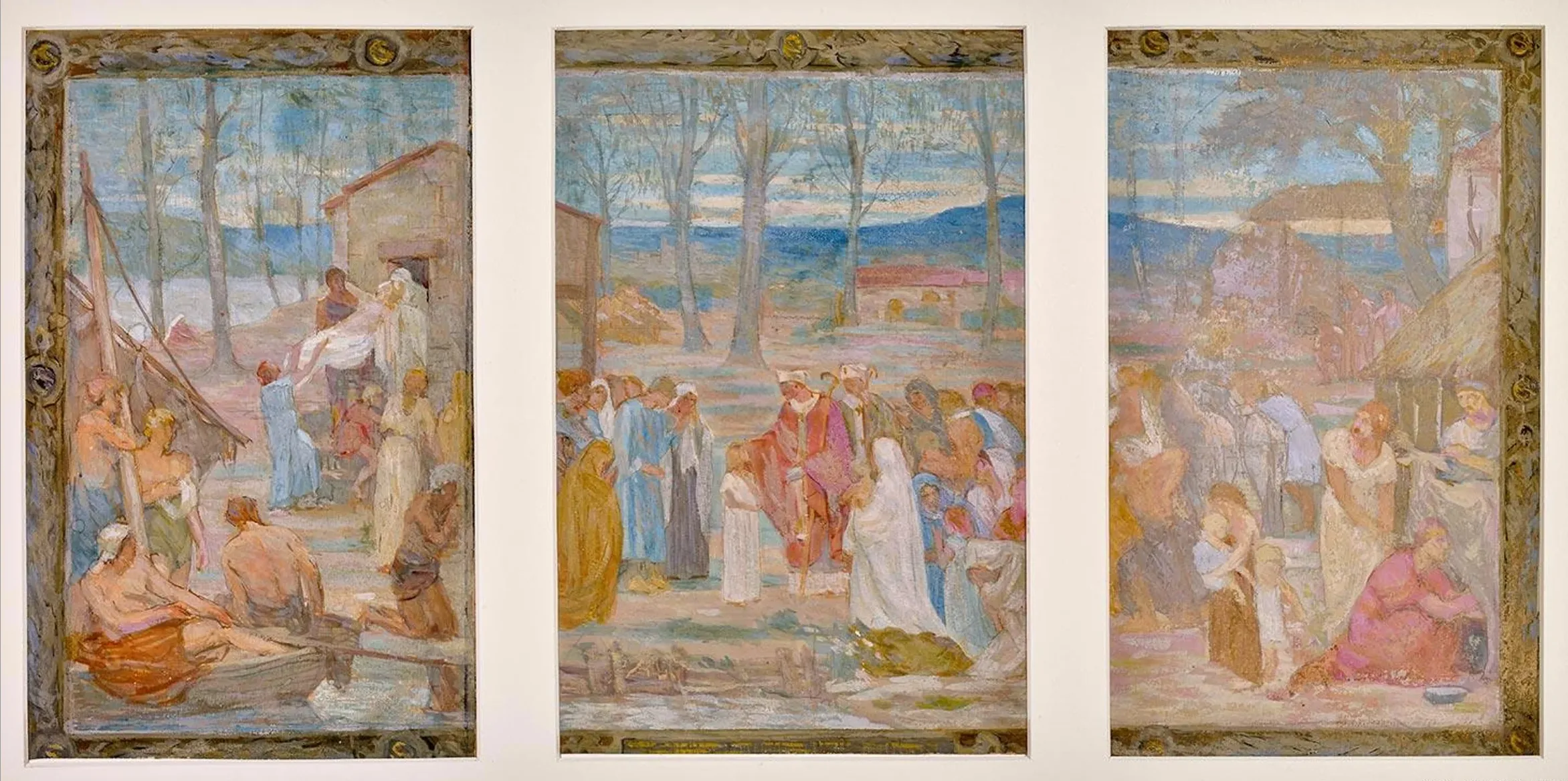
E. Charlton Fortune, Triptych after Puvis de Chavannes' La vie pastorale de sainte Geneviève, (1912), gouache on cardboard, SMCMoA collection.

Other collections include the Social Justice & Political Prints Collection; the American Photography Collection; the African Art Collection; the Asian, Oceanic, and Indigenous Peoples of the Americas Collection; and the Religious Collection, with works from the Medieval, Renaissance, and Baroque eras related to the Catholic church.

== Exhibitions ==
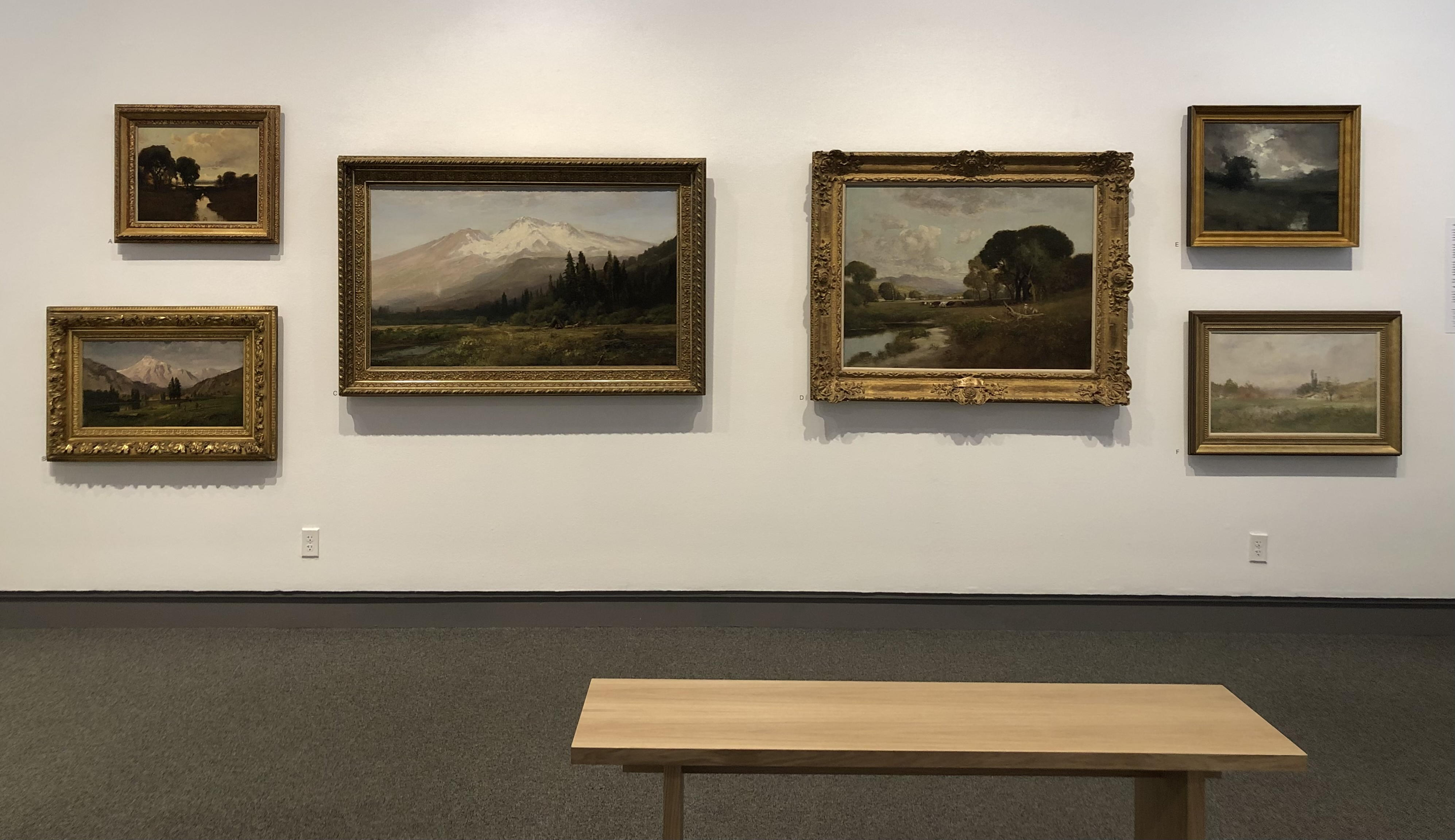
Six paintings by William Keith on display in the museum, March 2024. Photo by Steven Saylor.

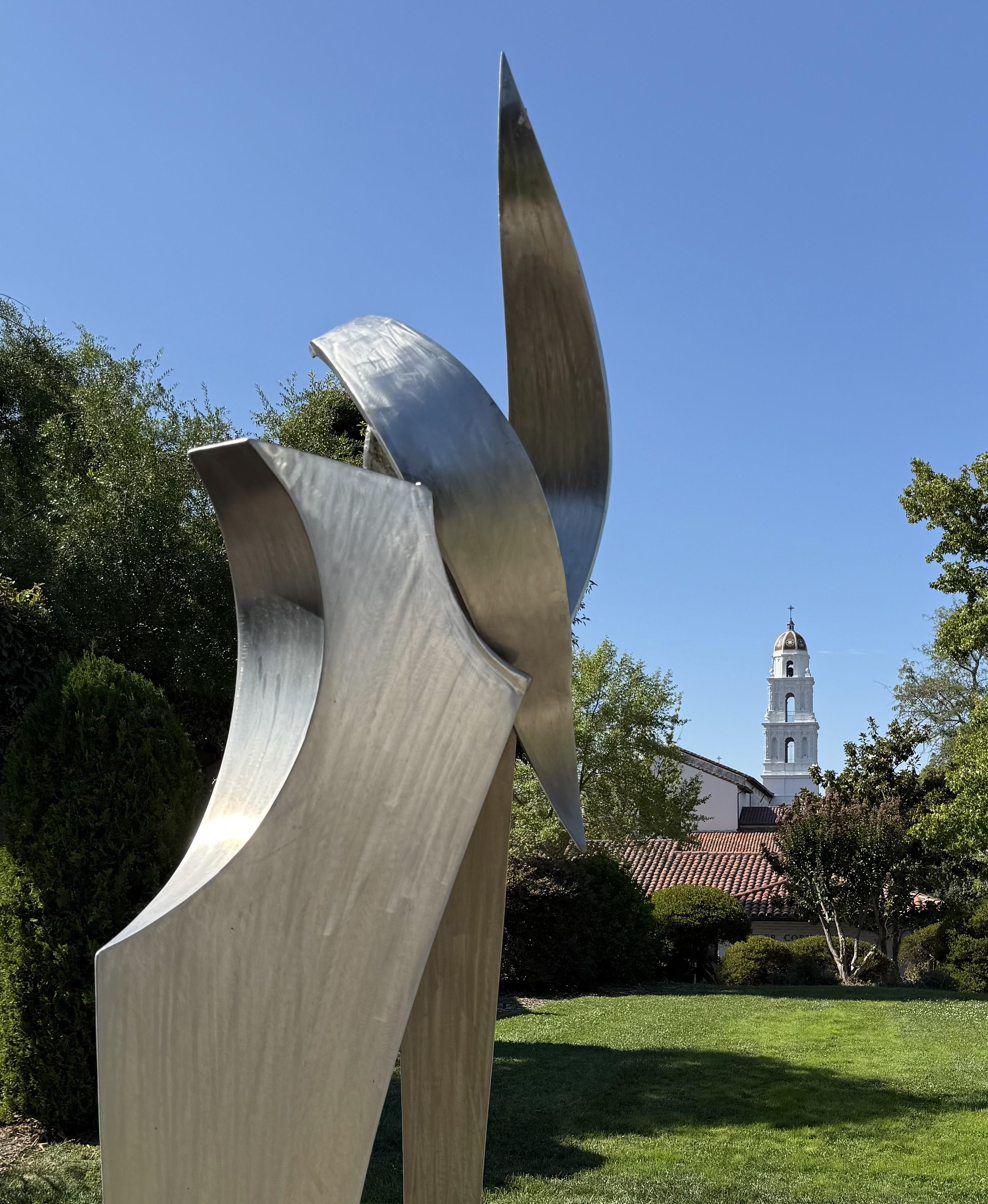
Outdoor sculpture on campus. Photo by Steven Saylor.

According to its website, "The museum rotates exhibitions twice a year, showcasing the permanent collection, traveling exhibitions, and emerging California artists." All exhibitions and public programs are free and open to the public, and the facility is ADA accessible.

Works from the collection also rotate on view in the campus library, chapel, public spaces, and offices, with sculptural works on the grounds and in gardens.

Some exhibitions since the museum's rechristening in 2011 include:

- The Comprehensive Keith: A Centennial Tribute, 2011
- Richard McLean, Master Artist Tribute IX, Horses, Landscapes and Portraits, 2012
- Nyame Brown, John Henry's Adventures In a Post-Black World, 2012
- Lockwood de Forest, In Search of the Source: The Nile and Beyond, 2013
- Pueblo to Pueblo: The Legacy of Southwest Indian Pottery, 2014
- Grace Hudson: Painter of the Pomo People, 2014
- Bright and Beautiful: Early San Francisco Bay Area Watercolors, the Collection of Roger and Kathy Carter, 2015
- A Fine Line: The Doctor Maurice Alberti Print Collection of European and American Masters, 2015
- William Keith and the Battle for Hetch Hetchy, 2016
- Darker Shades of Red: Soviet Propaganda Posters from the Cold War Era, 2018
- Collective Memories: Stonecuts from Cape Dorset, 2021
- Corita Kent: heroes & sheroes, 2023
- Hold It Lightly, the first solo museum exhibit of the works of Lisa Congdon, 2023–2024
- Harmonia Rosales, ΩA Omega Alpha, 2024
