= August Gay =

French-American Painter & Etcher

- Born: June 11, 1890; Rabou, France
- Died: 1948 (aged 57–58); Monterey, California, U.S.
- Occupations: Painter, etcher
- Spouse: Marcelle Chaix

August Gay whose birth name was Auguste-François Pierre Gay (June 11, 1890 – 1948) was a French-born American painter and etcher. He was a member of the Society of Six in Oakland, California, and an Impressionist landscape painter.

== Life ==
Gay was born on June 11, 1890, in Rabou, France. He emigrated to the United States with his family as a teenager, settling in Alameda, California. He suffered from tuberculosis as a young man, and he attended the California School of Fine Arts.

Gay co-founded the Society of Six with Selden Connor Gile, Maurice Logan, Louis Siegriest, Bernard von Eichman, and William H. Clapp, in Oakland, California. He was an Impressionist, and he painted California landscapes en plein air. For art historian Nancy Boas, Gay had "an instinctive understanding of picture making, an original sense of color, and a desire to deal with important pictorial issues." Gay later moved to Monterey, where he shared a studio with Clayton Sumner Price and he managed a furniture repair store.

Gay married Marcelle Chaix, who was also French, in 1934. He died in 1948. His artwork can be seen at the Oakland Museum of California.
