= William H. Clapp =

Canadian-American painter (1879–1954)

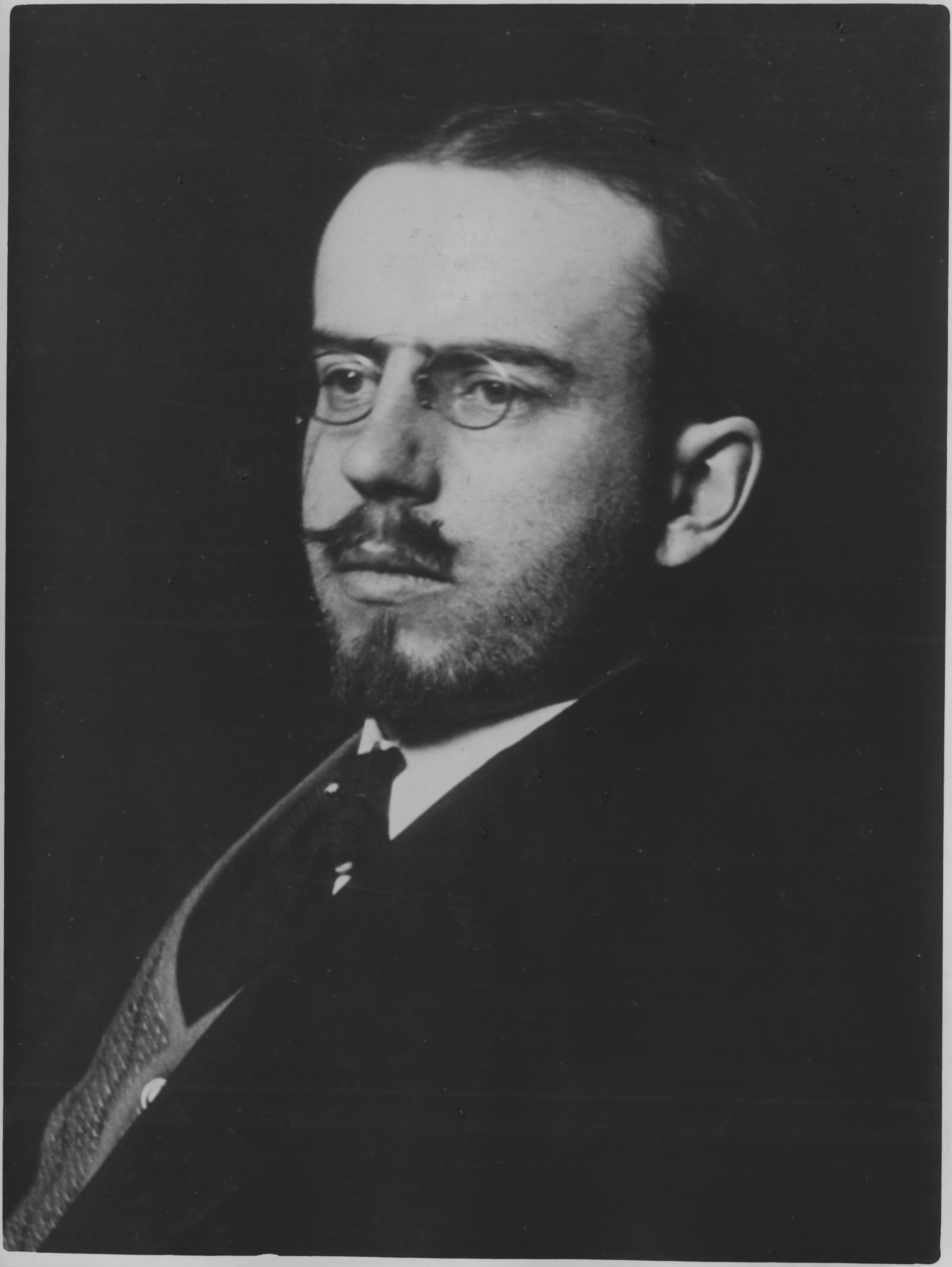
- Clapp, 1920s–1930s
- Born: William Henry Clapp; October 29, 1879; Montreal, Canada
- Died: April 21, 1954 (aged 74); Oakland, California, U.S.
- Education: Académie Julian; Académie de la Grande Chaumière; Académie Colarossi
- Occupation: Painter
- Spouse: Gertrude Clapp

William Henry Clapp (October 29, 1879 - April 21, 1954) was a Canadian-American painter and art curator. He was a member of the Society of Six in Oakland, California, and an Impressionist landscape painter. He was also the curator of the Oakland Art Gallery.

== Biography ==
Clapp was born on October 29, 1879, in Montreal, Canada. He was born a U.S. citizen as both his parents were American. He moved with his family to Oakland, California in 1885, but returned to Montreal in 1900 to study with William Brymner at the Art Association of Montreal. Fellow students included Clarence Gagnon and Henri Hébert and the three artists moved to Paris in the fall of 1904. In Paris, he spent four years, and attended the Académie Julian, the Académie de la Grande Chaumière and the Académie Colarossi, and was introduced to Fauvism. In 1906, he exhibited his work at the Salon d'Automne.

In France, his style was transformed into a personal form of Impressionism, verging on Pointillism, depicting the way in which he experienced and saw the world. He became mostly known for his brilliant, high-keyed, colourful landscapes inspired by Monet and for his interest in painting the figure, mostly academic-influenced and idealized nudes. In 1907, he travelled to Belgium and Spain, where he studied in Madrid with William Laparra and regularly visited the Prado Museum. Returning to Montreal in 1908, Clapp brought with him his innovative interpretation of Impressionism, applying it to Canadian subject matter, which received mixed and uncomprehending reactions from critics and the public but at the Art Association of Montreal's Spring Exhibition in 1908 he shared the Jessie Dow Prize with Helen McNicoll for his painting Morning in Spain (1908, National Gallery of Canada).

After exhibiting his work in Montreal in a solo exhibition in 1914, he left Canada and lived in Cuba from 1915 to 1917, then moved to Oakland, California, where he co-founded the Society of Six with Selden Connor Gile, August Gay, Maurice Logan, Louis Siegriest, and Bernard von Eichman, and he wrote their manifesto. From 1918 to 1952, he curated the Oakland Art Gallery, where he sold their paintings. Clapp was a member of the Canadian Art Club and the Royal Canadian Academy of Arts.

Clapp resided in Piedmont, California, with his wife Gertrude. He died on April 21, 1954, in Oakland, California, at age 74. His artwork can be seen at the Smithsonian American Art Museum and the Musée national des beaux-arts du Québec.
