= Tessina =

Swiss 35mm camera

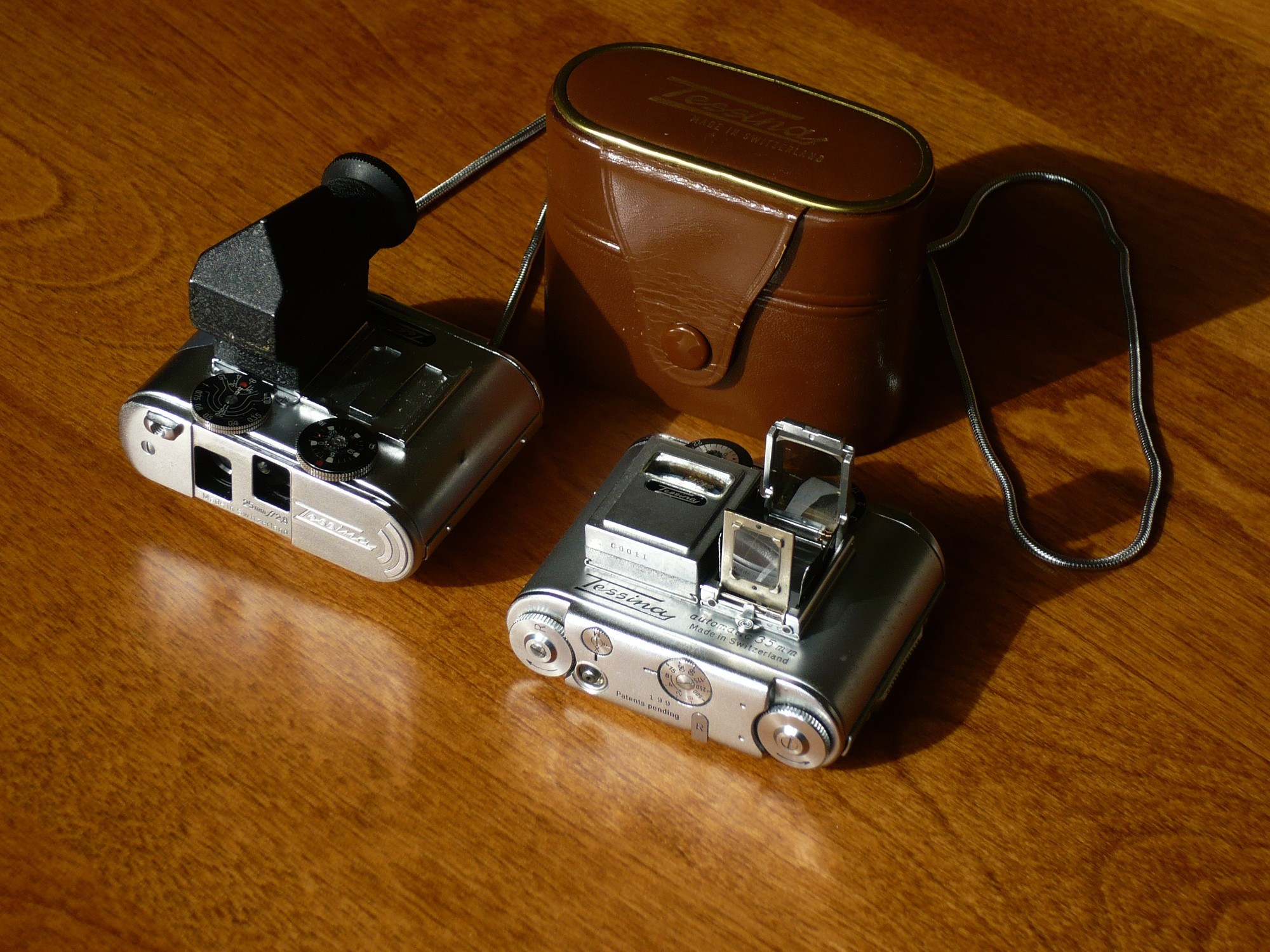
Tessina Automatic with a chrome pentaprism, Tessina 35 with waist level viewfinder, brown leather case with gold trim and chain

The Tessina (officially created by Arnold Siegrist) is a high-quality 35mm camera patented by Austrian chemical engineer Dr. Rudolph Steineck in Lugano Switzerland, manufactured by Siegrist in Grenchen Switzerland. It was introduced in 1957 and distributed by Steineck's company Concava S.A and remained in production up to 1996. The Tessina takes 14x21 mm pictures on standard 35 mm film (loaded into a special cassette), making it one of the few subminiature cameras to use the format. It is a very small (2.5x2x1 inch) twin lens reflex, with two 25 mm f/2.8 Tessinon lenses, one for taking the picture, the other for viewing on a tiny ground-glass focusing screen on top of the camera. A 45° mirror is employed to bend incoming light onto the film, which lies along the bottom of the camera rather than the back to save space. Apertures are continuously variable down to f/22, and shutter speeds range from 1/2 to 1/500, and B. The Tessina 35, Tessina L can focus down to 9 inches, Tessina Automatic 35mm to 12 inches. The film is advanced via a clockwork master spring built into the takeup spool, with a pullout winder like the crown on a wristwatch. Each winding can last up to 8 exposures.

Tessina is hand assembled from more than two hundred precision parts, it contains ruby bearing like swiss watch to reduce friction, each camera is designed for 100,000 pictures. Three models have been produced: Tessina Automatic 35mm, Tessina 35 and Tessina L; available were a variety of color/finish combinations that included brushed, painted or anodized aluminium, black and aluminium, all black, gold and red. All three models are very similar.

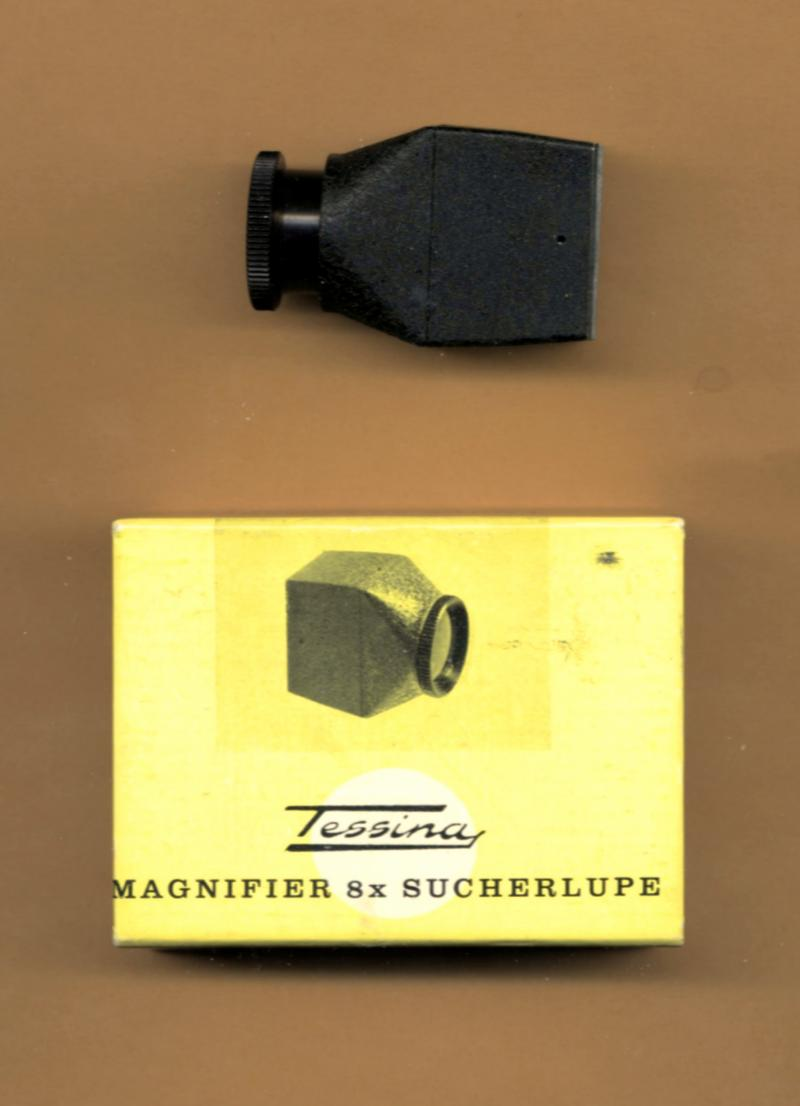
Tessina 8x magnifier

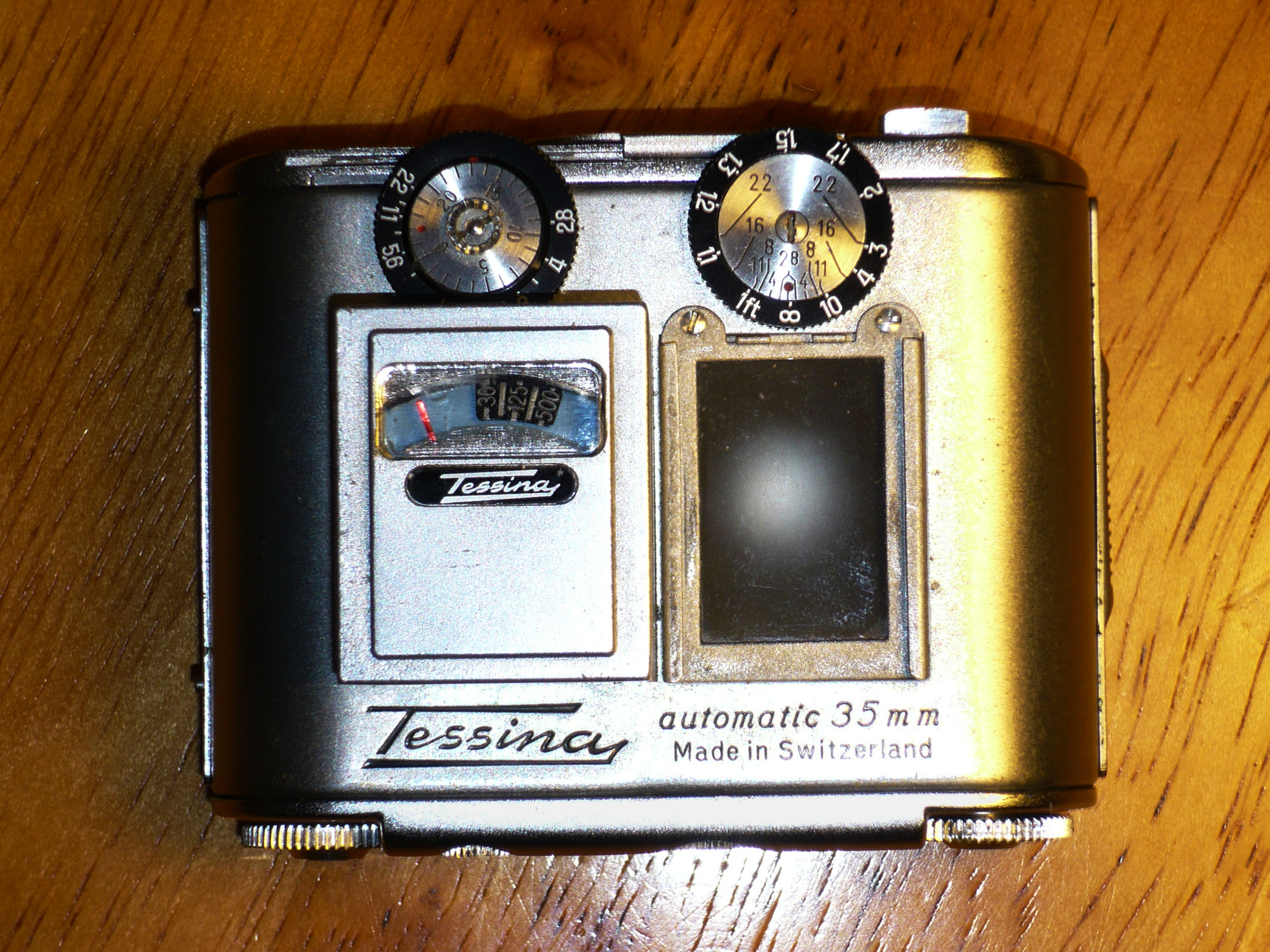
Tessina selenium exposure meter

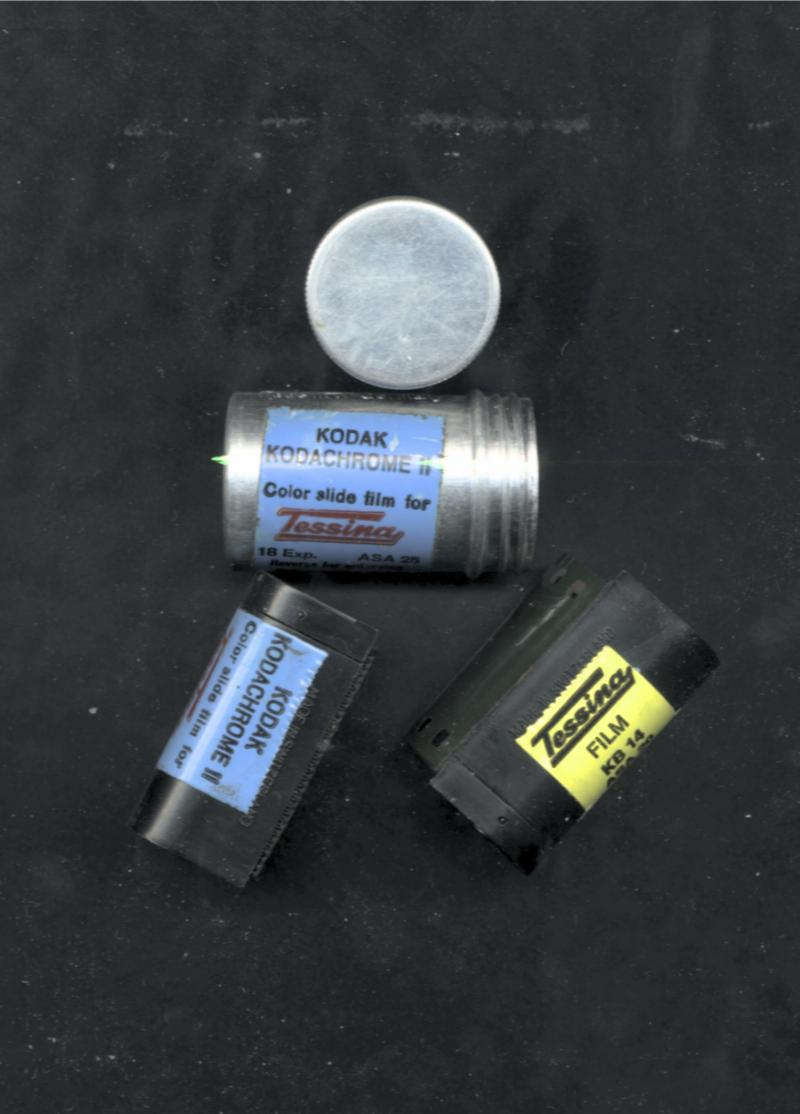
Tessina film

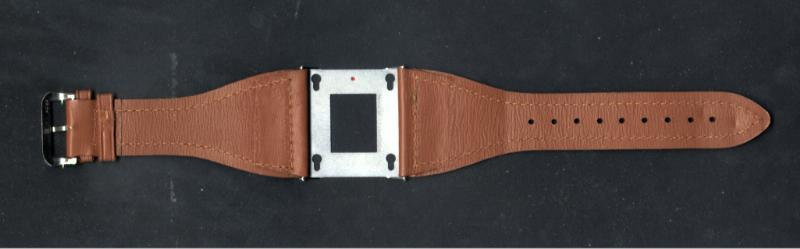
Tessina wrist band，for attaching to the back of Tessina camera and wear on the wrist like a large watch

.

Accessories include:

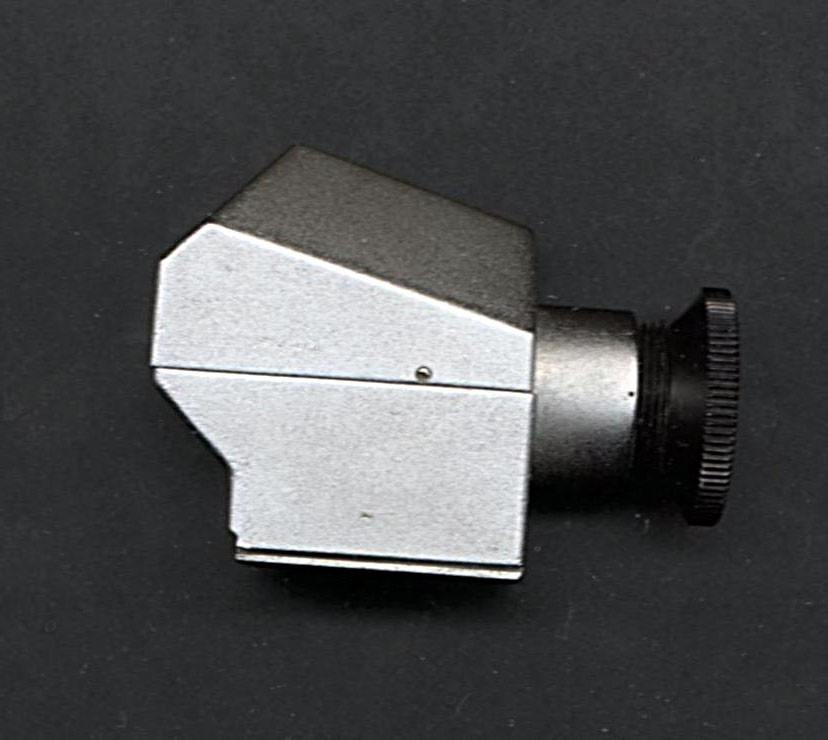
Tessina silver pentaprism

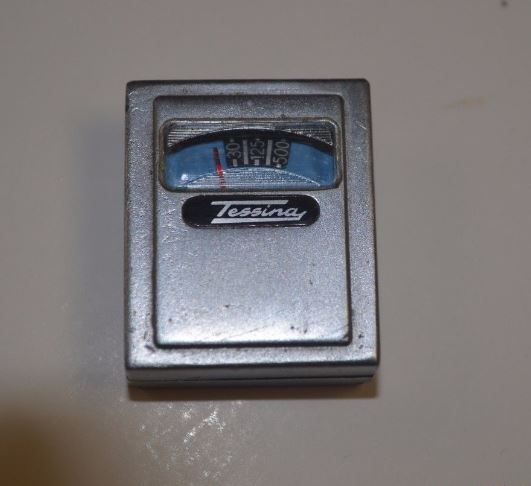
TESSINA METER

- folding focusing hood/sports finder (standard fitment)
- 6x pentaprism (black and chrome)
- 8x magnifier viewer
- folding sports finder (no optics)
- chain and tripod adapter
- hotshoe adapter
- film loader
- Selenium exposure meter dimension:26.5mm x22.2mm x9.8mm, weight 19.5g, the smallest exposure meter in the world.
- flash gun
- Tessina 17 jewel mechanical watch
- leather belt case in black or brown with gold color trim.
- Wrist bracket, for wearing Tessina camera like a large watch
