= Edna Stoddart =

American painter (1888–1966)

- Born: January 9, 1888; Oakland, California, U.S.
- Died: December 22, 1966 (aged 78); Mexico
- Resting place: San Luis Potosí, Mexico
- Education: Mills College; California College of the Arts; California School of Fine Arts
- Occupations: Painter, diarist
- Spouse: Louis Siegriest
- Children: 1 son, 1 daughter
- Relatives: Josephine Earp (aunt); Lundy Siegriest (stepson)

Edna Stoddart (9 January 1888 – 22 December 1966) was an American painter and diarist.

== Life ==
Edna Anita Lehnhardt was born January 9, 1888, in Oakland, California, to Emil Henry Lehnhardt (1857–1911) and Henrietta W. “Hattie” (Marcus) Lehnhardt (1863–1936). Her aunt was Josephine Earp. She graduated from Mills College, the California College of the Arts, and the California School of Fine Arts. She was trained by Jean Varda, David Park, Mark Rothko, Felix Ruvolo, and Glenn Wessels.

Stoddart became an oil painter. According to Mick Gidley, an Emeritus Professor of American Literature & Culture at the University of Leeds, Stoddart's "brightly coloured pictures looked like illustrations to lost or unwritten fairy tales, and teemed with creatures, both familiar and exotic." Stoddart exhibited her work in the United States, Canada and Mexico. She was also a life-long diarist.

Stoddart had a son, Emil Josef Cowing (1912–1973), and a daughter, Marjorie Joel (Cowing) Macartney (1909–1996), from a previous marriage to Estes Joseph Cowing (1888–1946). In 1920 she married Herbert Allen Stoddart (1883–1929). She later married painter Louis Siegriest, and they resided in Oakland. Her stepson, Lundy Siegriest, was also a painter.

Stoddart died of a heart attack on December 22, 1966, in San Luis Potosí, Mexico, where she was on holiday with her husband at the Siegriests' second home. She was buried in San Luis Potosí, Mexico. Her diaries were bequeathed to the Smithsonian Institution.
