= Filippo Collura =

Italian politician (1944–2025)

President of the Province of Caltanissetta
- In office 8 June 1998 – 17 June 2008
- Preceded by: Vincenzo Rampulla
- Succeeded by: Giuseppe Federico

Personal details
- Born: 2 January 1944 Gela, Province of Caltanissetta, Kingdom of Italy
- Died: 25 January 2025 (aged 81) Gela, Sicily, Italy
- Party: Italian People's Party; The Daisy; Democratic Party
- Occupation: Teacher, school principal

Filippo Collura (2 January 1944 – 25 January 2025) was an Italian politician and educator who served as president of the Province of Caltanissetta from 1998 to 2008.

== Life and career ==
Collura was born in Gela, Sicily, in 1944. He worked as a teacher and school principal before entering political career.

In the 1994 European Parliament election, Collura was a candidate for the Italian People's Party in the Insular Italy constituency, but was not elected.

Collura was elected president of the Province of Caltanissetta in the 1998 provincial election, supported by a centre-left coalition. He won the runoff with 62.4% of the vote against incumbent president Vincenzo Rampulla. In 2002, he joined The Daisy. He was re-elected president in the 2003 provincial election, defeating centre-right candidate Massimo Dell'Utri in the runoff with 57.46% of the vote. His governing majority included The Daisy, the Democrats of the Left, Union of Democrats for Europe, Party of Italian Communists, Italian Democratic Socialists, and Communist Refoundation Party. He later joined the newly established Democratic Party.

Collura died in his hometown Gela on 25 January 2025, aged 81.
