= Walter Tesauro =

Italian politician (born 1962)

- Tesauro in 2024

Mayor of Caltanissetta
- Incumbent
- Assumed office 25 June 2024
- Preceded by: Roberto Gambino

President of the Free Municipal Consortium of Caltanissetta
- Incumbent
- Assumed office 28 April 2025
- Preceded by: Office established

Personal details
- Born: Walter Calogero Tesauro; 27 February 1962 (age 64) Caltanissetta, Sicily, Italy
- Party: Union of the Centre (2014–2022); Forza Italia (since 2022)
- Education: University of Palermo
- Profession: Lawyer

Walter Calogero Tesauro (born 27 February 1962) is an Italian politician and lawyer who has served as mayor of Caltanissetta since 2024 and as president of the Free Municipal Consortium of Caltanissetta since 2025.

== Life and career ==
Tesauro was born in Caltanissetta, Sicily, in 1962. He graduated in law from the University of Palermo and worked as a lawyer. A member of the Union of the Centre, he was elected to the Caltanissetta City Council in 2014. He joined Forza Italia in 2022.

At the 2024 municipal elections, Tesauro ran for mayor of Caltanissetta, supported by a centre-right coalition comprising Brothers of Italy, Forza Italia, Lega, Union of the Centre, Us Moderates, and several civic lists. He was elected in the runoff with 52.36% of the vote, defeating centre-left candidate Annalisa Petitto, who received 47.64%.

In April 2025, Tesauro was elected president of the Free Municipal Consortium of Caltanissetta, the Sicilian local government body that replaced the former Provincial Council. Supported by Forza Italia, the Movement for Autonomy, and civic candidates, he defeated Massimiliano Conti, mayor of Niscemi, who was supported by other centre-right parties, namely Lega, Brothers of Italy, and Us Moderates, as well as Terenziano Di Stefano, mayor of Gela, who was supported by the centre-left. Tesauro thus became the first president of the Free Municipal Consortium after more than ten years under commissioners.
