= List of presidents of the Province of Caltanissetta =

President of the Province of Caltanissetta
- Presidente della Provincia di Caltanissetta; Presidente del Libero consorzio comunale di Caltanissetta

- Incumbent; Walter Tesauro since 28 April 2025
- Inaugural holder: Gaetano Le Moli
- Formation: 1889

The president of the Province of Caltanissetta was the head of the provincial administration of Caltanissetta, a local government authority in Sicily, Italy. Since 2025, the chairman of the provincial administration is the president of the Free Municipal Consortium (Libero consorzio comunale).

== List ==
=== Presidents of the Provincial Deputation (1889–1927) ===
No.	Portrait	Name	Term of office		Party
No.	Portrait	Name	Start	End	Party
1		Gaetano Le Moli	1889	1892	?
2		Giovanni Roxas	1893	1895	?
3		Francesco Tumminelli	1895	1899	?
(1)		Gaetano Le Moli	1899	1909	?
4		Giuseppe Scarlata	1909	1911	?
5		Gaetano Bongiorno	1911	1914	?
6		Salvatore Camerata	1914	?	?

=== Presidents of the Provincial Deputation (1943–1947) ===
No.	Portrait	Name	Term of office		Party
No.	Portrait	Name	Start	End	Party
		Vincenzo Testasecca	25 November 1943	6 August 1944	?
		Pietro Guarino	6 August 1944	13 March 1945	?
		Edoardo Rotigliano (Prefectural commissioner)	13 March 1945	16 May 1947	—
		Venanzio Cucugliata (Prefectural commissioner)	16 May 1947	5 August 1947	—

=== Presidents of the Province (1947–2012) ===
No.	Portrait	Name	Term of office		Party
No.	Portrait	Name	Start	End	Party
		Gaetano Gozzo	5 August 1947	13 September 1947	?
		Francesco Fiandaca	13 September 1947	29 June 1950	?
		Martino Vittorio Russo (Acting)	29 June 1950	26 June 1951	?
		Salvatore Spinnato	26 June 1951	13 June 1955	?
		Francesco Spataro	13 June 1955	13 May 1959	?
		Michele Andaloro	13 May 1959	17 August 1960	?
		Raffaele Falletta	17 August 1960	11 December 1961	?
		Raffaele Falletta	11 December 1961	28 December 1970	?
		Ferdinando Maiorana	28 December 1970	24 April 1974	?
		Giuseppe Taglialavore	24 April 1974	22 September 1975	?
		Giuseppe Bufalino	22 September 1975	4 May 1976	?
		Domenico Amato	4 May 1976	24 May 1976	?
		Giuseppe Bufalino	3 June 1976	13 September 1980	?
		Filippo Butera	13 September 1980	30 July 1983	Christian Democracy
		Cosimo Cigna	30 July 1983	21 July 1992	Christian Democracy
		Ernesto Fasulo	21 July 1992	30 June 1994	Christian Democracy
		Vincenzo Rampulla	30 June 1994	10 June 1998	Forza Italia
		Filippo Collura	10 June 1998	10 June 2003	Italian People's Party; The Daisy; Democratic Party
		Filippo Collura	10 June 2003	18 June 2008	Italian People's Party; The Daisy; Democratic Party
		Giuseppe Federico	18 June 2008	15 November 2011	Movement for Autonomy
		Calogero Salvaggio (Acting)	15 November 2011	31 January 2012	The People of Freedom

=== Regional commissioners (2012–2025) ===
Name	Term of office	
Name	Start	End
Damiano Li Vecchi	1 February 2012	28 April 2013
Raffaele Sirico	29 April 2013	31 October 2014
Calogero Guagliano	9 December 2014	8 April 2015
Rosaria Barresi	4 May 2015	26 June 2015
Luciana Giammanco	8 July 2015	11 November 2015
Alessandra Di Liberto	25 November 2015	25 February 2016
Rosalba Panvini	24 March 2016	8 January 2020
Duilio Alongi	9 January 2020	31 August 2023
Vitalba Vaccaro	18 September 2023	30 November 2023
Dorotea Di Trapani	5 December 2023	28 April 2025

=== Presidents of the Free Municipal Consortium (2025–present) ===
No.	Portrait	Name	Term of office		Party
No.	Portrait	Name	Start	End	Party
1		Walter Tesauro	28 April 2025	Incumbent	Forza Italia

== Sources ==
- "Storia amministrativa dell'ente". Ministero dell'Interno.
- "Viaggio nel Palazzo". Libero Consorzio Comunale di Caltanissetta.
- Menichini, Piera (2005). "I presidenti delle Province dall'Unità alla Grande guerra: repertorio analitico". Storia Amministrazione Costituzione (13): 237–238.
