= Maurice Logan =

American painter (1886–1977)

Maurice George Logan
- Born: February 21, 1886; San Francisco, California, U.S.
- Died: March 19, 1977 (aged 91); Orinda, California, U.S.
- Education: San Francisco Art Institute; California College of the Arts; Chicago Art Institute
- Occupation: Painter
- Spouse: Bertha Kipke
- Children: 1 son, 1 daughter

Maurice Logan (March 21, 1886 — March 19, 1977) was an American watercolorist, commercial artist and arts educator. He was a member of the Society of Six, and a professor at the California College of the Arts in Oakland, California.

== Life ==
Logan was born on March 21, 1886, in San Francisco to an English mother, who died when he was six months old, and an American father, who remarried shortly after. He grew up in Oakland, California, and he was trained at the San Francisco Art Institute, the California College of the Arts, and the Chicago Art Institute.

Logan established a studio as a watercolorist and commercial artist in Oakland in 1915. He was a member of the Society of Six alongside Selden Connor Gile, August Gay, Louis Bassi Siegriest, Bernard von Eichman, and William H. Clapp. He was also a professor at his alma mater, the California College of the Arts. He was a member of the American Watercolor Society, the Society of Western Artists, the National Academy of Design, and the Society of Illustrators.

Logan married Bertha Kipke. They had a son, Richard, and a daughter, Jean Rees. Logan died on March 19, 1977, in Orinda, California.
