= Roberto Gambino =

Italian architect and politician

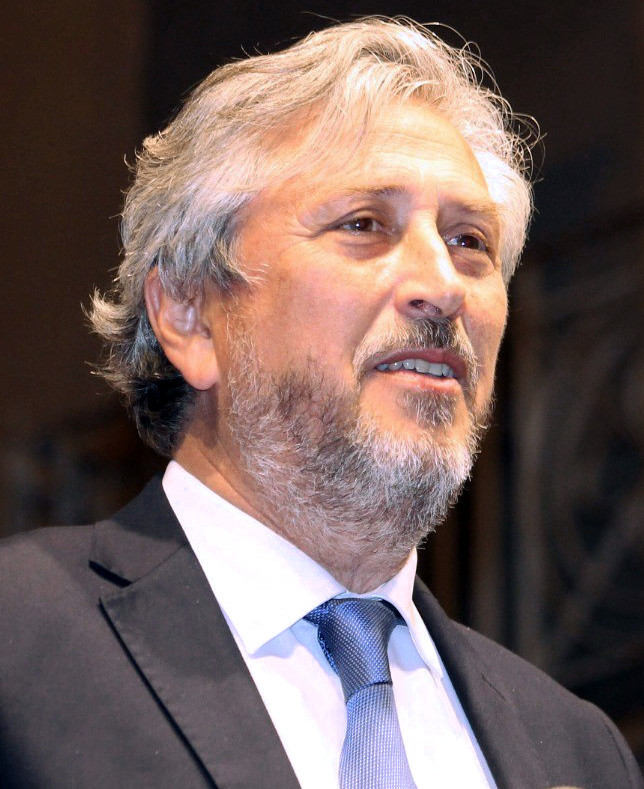

Mayor of Caltanissetta
- In office 15 May 2019 – 25 June 2024
- Preceded by: Giovanni Ruvolo
- Succeeded by: Walter Tesauro

Personal details
- Born: 15 February 1962 (age 64) Palermo, Sicily, Italy
- Party: Five Star Movement
- Education: University of Palermo
- Profession: architect

Roberto Gambino (born 15 February 1962 in Palermo) is an Italian architect and politician.

He ran for Mayor of Caltanissetta with the Five Star Movement at the 2019 Italian local elections and he was elected on 12 May. He took office on 15 May 2019.

== See also ==
- 2019 Italian local elections
- List of mayors of Caltanissetta

Political offices
Preceded by Giovanni Ruvolo	Mayor of Caltanissetta; 2019-2024	Succeeded by Walter Tesauro
