= Siegrist =

Siegrist is a surname. Notable people with the surname include:

- August Siegrist (1865–1947), Swiss ophthalmologist
- Beatrice Siegrist (born 1934), French composer
- Benjamin Siegrist (born 1992), Swiss football goalkeeper
- Brent Siegrist (born 1952), American politician
- Charles Siegrist (1880–1953), American trapeze artist
- Edouard Siegrist (1923–2000), Swiss field hockey player
- H. Siegrist (1869–????), Swiss footballer
- Jonathan Siegrist (born 1985), American rock climber
- Kevin Siegrist (born 1989), American baseball player
- Maddy Siegrist (born 2000), American basketball player
- Manuela Siegrist (born 1990), Swiss curler
- Nico Siegrist (born 1991), football striker
- Sally Siegrist (1951–2022), American politician
- Sloan Siegrist (born 1980), American-Guamanian middle-distance runner
- Theo H. Siegrist, American professor

== See also ==
- Siegrist streaks, rare manifestation of hypertensive choroidopathy
- Siegrist's Mill Covered Bridge, covered bridge that spanned the Big Chiques Creek in Lancaster County, Pennsylvania, United States
