= Society of Six =

The Society of Six was a group of artists who painted outdoors, socialized, and exhibited together in and around Oakland, California in the 1910s and 1920s. They included Selden Connor Gile, August Gay, Maurice Logan, Louis Siegriest, Bernard von Eichman, and William H. Clapp. They were somewhat isolated from the artistic mainstream of the San Francisco Bay Area at the time, and painted in more avant-garde styles than most of their peers, especially after being inspired by modern trends represented in the Panama Pacific International Exposition of 1915.

== Artists ==
William Henry Clapp (1879-1954) was the last to join the group and had the most cosmopolitan background, including art training in Montreal and Paris and a six-month stay in New York City. Having lived in Oakland in his youth, he returned in 1917, settled in Piedmont, and began teaching life drawing at the California School of Arts and Crafts. He was appointed acting director of the nearly new Oakland Art Gallery in 1918 and served as its director from 1919 to 1952. In 1923 he organized the first of six annual Society of Six exhibitions at that venue. Although he brought exposure through the gallery to more radical styles of painting, his own work adhered to the features of American Impressionism.

Selden Connor Gile (1877-1947) was the oldest member of the group, more than twenty years older than Siegriest (1899-1989) and von Eichman (1899-1970). Nancy Boas, author of The Society of Six: California Colorists, called Gile "the forceful center of the Six—teacher, provider, and provocative critic." Primarily self-taught, he enthusiastically embraced a vigorous style using broad, rapid brushstrokes and intense, non-naturalistic colors. His home was the social center for the Six, who would follow their days of plein-air painting with critique sessions, food, and drinking.

August (Gus) François Pierre Gay (1890-1948) immigrated from his native France to the United States in 1901, resided primarily with his father and three younger sisters in Alameda, California from 1903 to 1920, and studied at the California School of Arts and Crafts in Berkeley (1918–19) and at the California School of Fine Art in San Francisco while working at several odd jobs. In 1919 and 1920, when his art was exhibited at the Oakland Art Gallery with the work of Gile, Gay’s early use of color was called “unafraid.” By 1921 Gay was a Monterey resident, sharing a studio with Clayton Sumner Price in the Stevenson House, and exhibiting as a regular member of the Carmel-by-the-Sea art colony. Between 1923 and 1926 Gay exhibited with the Society of Six at the Oakland Art Gallery, but withdrew his art from the 1927 show in a dispute with the often dictatorial Selden Gile. While frequently exhibiting his bold Fauvist paintings throughout California (including shows at the Galerie des Beaux Arts, Los Angeles Museum and San Francisco Art Association), he developed a second career as a fine furniture craftsman and was invited to join the Monterey Guild, which was founded by E. Charlton Fortune for the purpose of making ecclesiastical furnishings. In the 1930s he created on the Monterey Peninsula several federally and privately funded murals, which are today regarded as masterpieces. In 1942 Gay moved with his wife to the Carmel Woods and built a home with his own hands. He died on March 9, 1948.

== Images ==
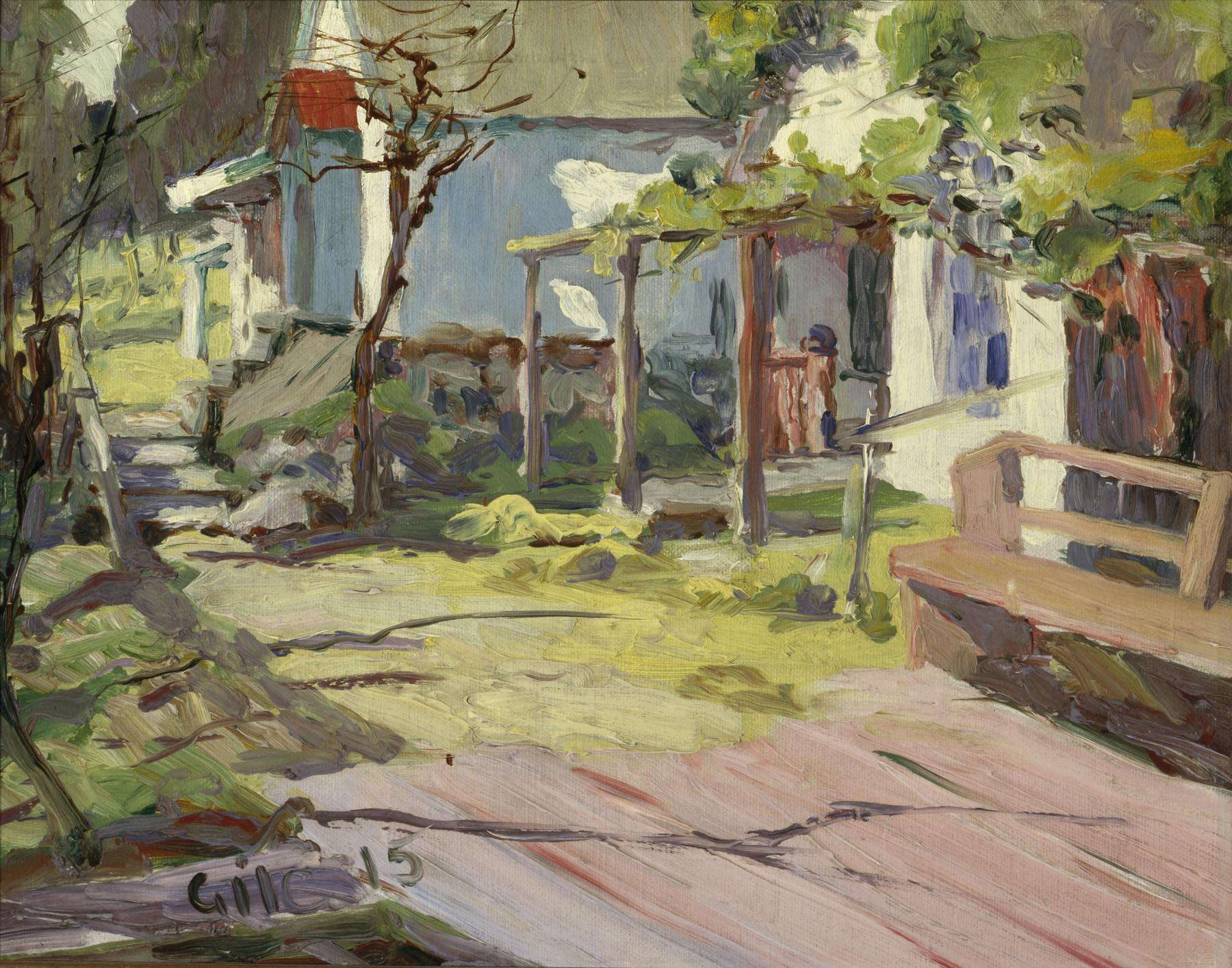
Selden Connor Gile, Joaquin Miller Home, 1915, oil on canvas, Oakland Museum of California

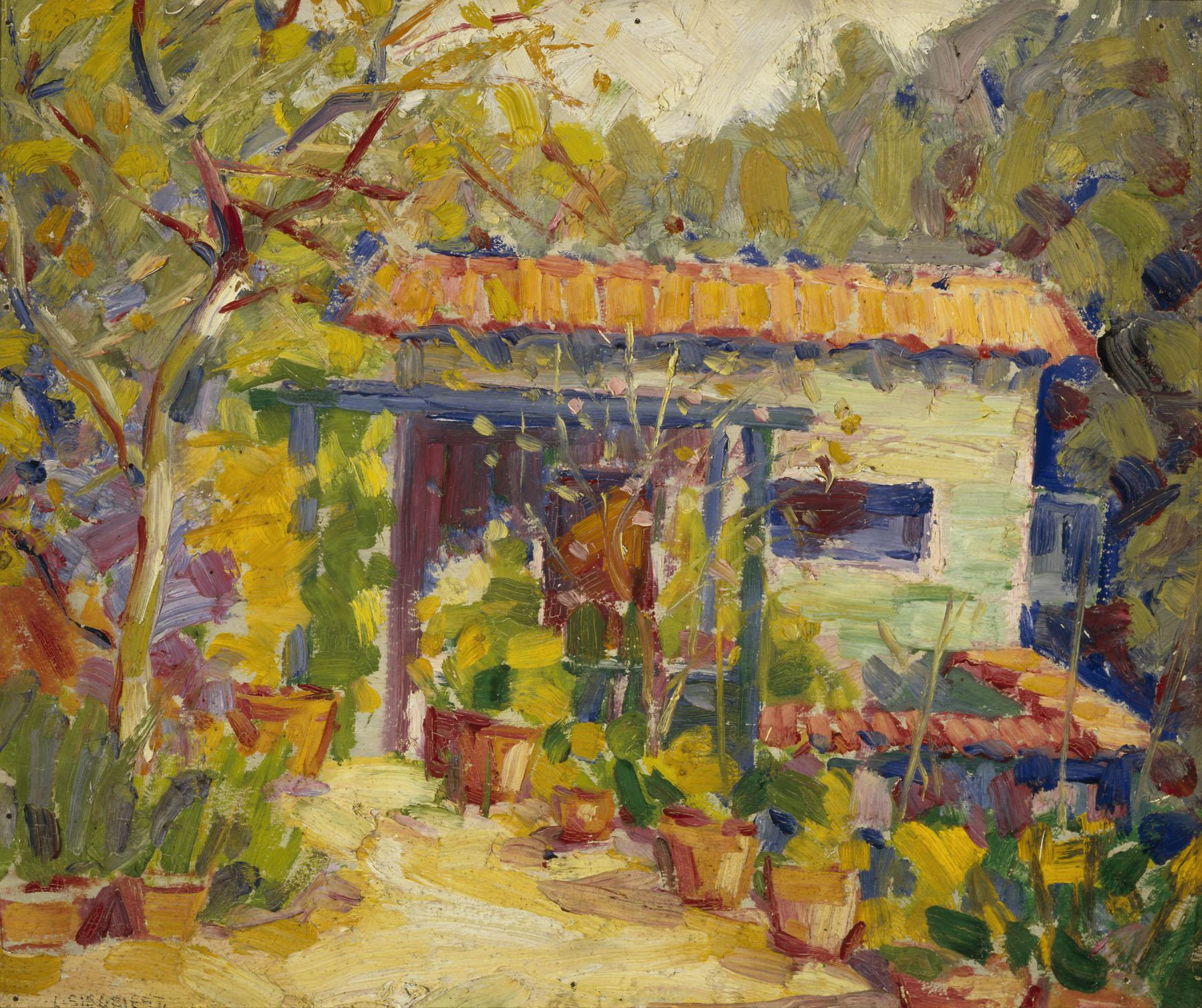
Louis Siegriest, Gile's House, 1921, oil on canvas, Oakland Museum of California

== Additional resources ==
- "Louis Bassi Siegriest Reminiscences," interview by Corinne L. Gilb, 1954, University of California Regional Oral History Office, Bancroft Library, Berkeley
- Ruth Lilly Westphal, ed. (1986). Plein Air Painters of California: The North. ISBN 0961052015
- Steven A. Nash, ed. (1995). Facing Eden: 100 Years of Landscape Art in the Bay Area. ISBN 0520203623
- William Clapp biography in progress
- Gallery newsletter with images
