= List of mayors of Caltanissetta =

Mayor of Caltanissetta
- Sindaco di Caltanissetta

- Incumbent; Walter Tesauro since 25 June 2024
- Appointer: Popular election
- Term length: 5 years, renewable once
- Website: Official website

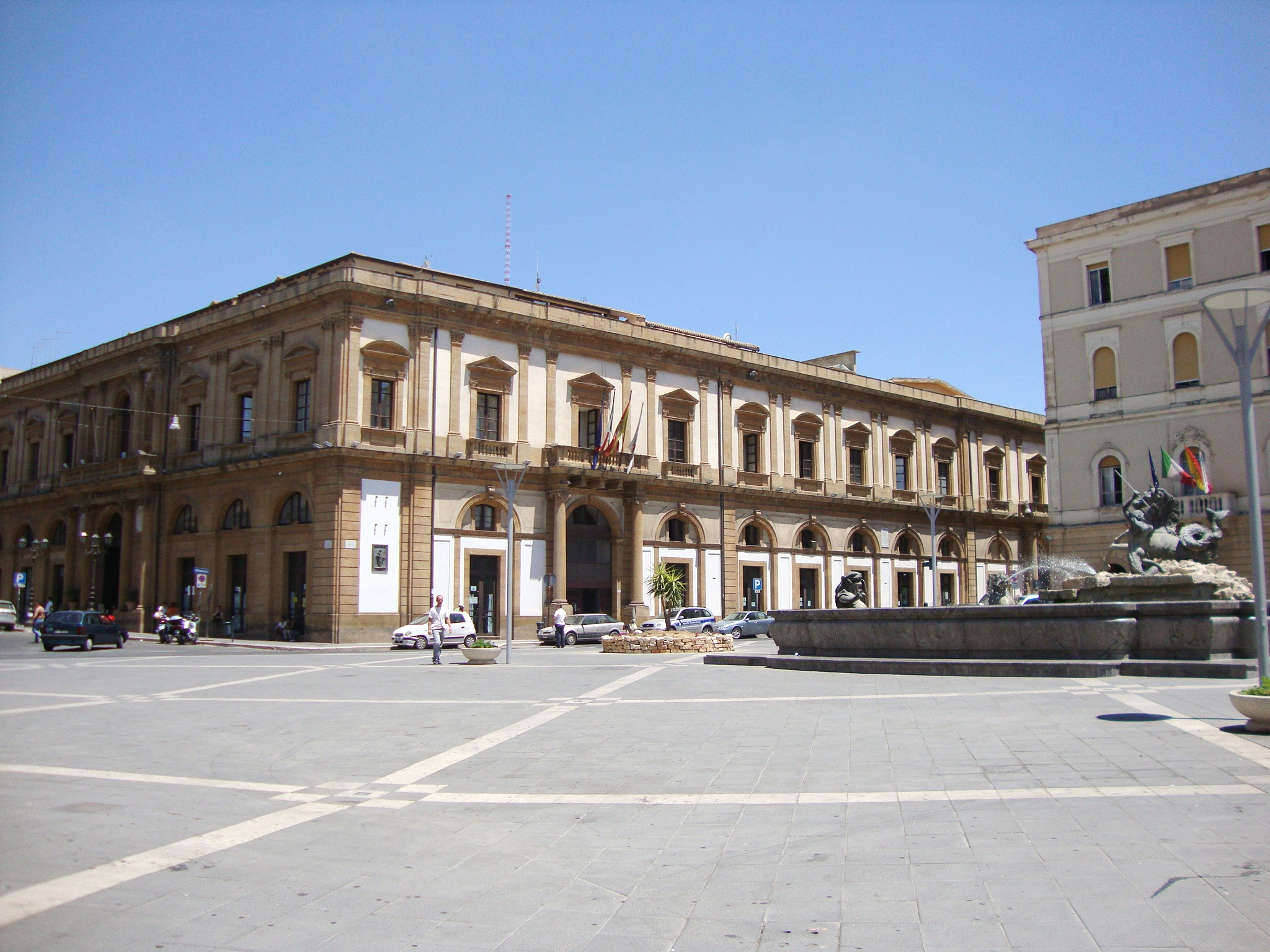
Caltanissetta's Town Hall.

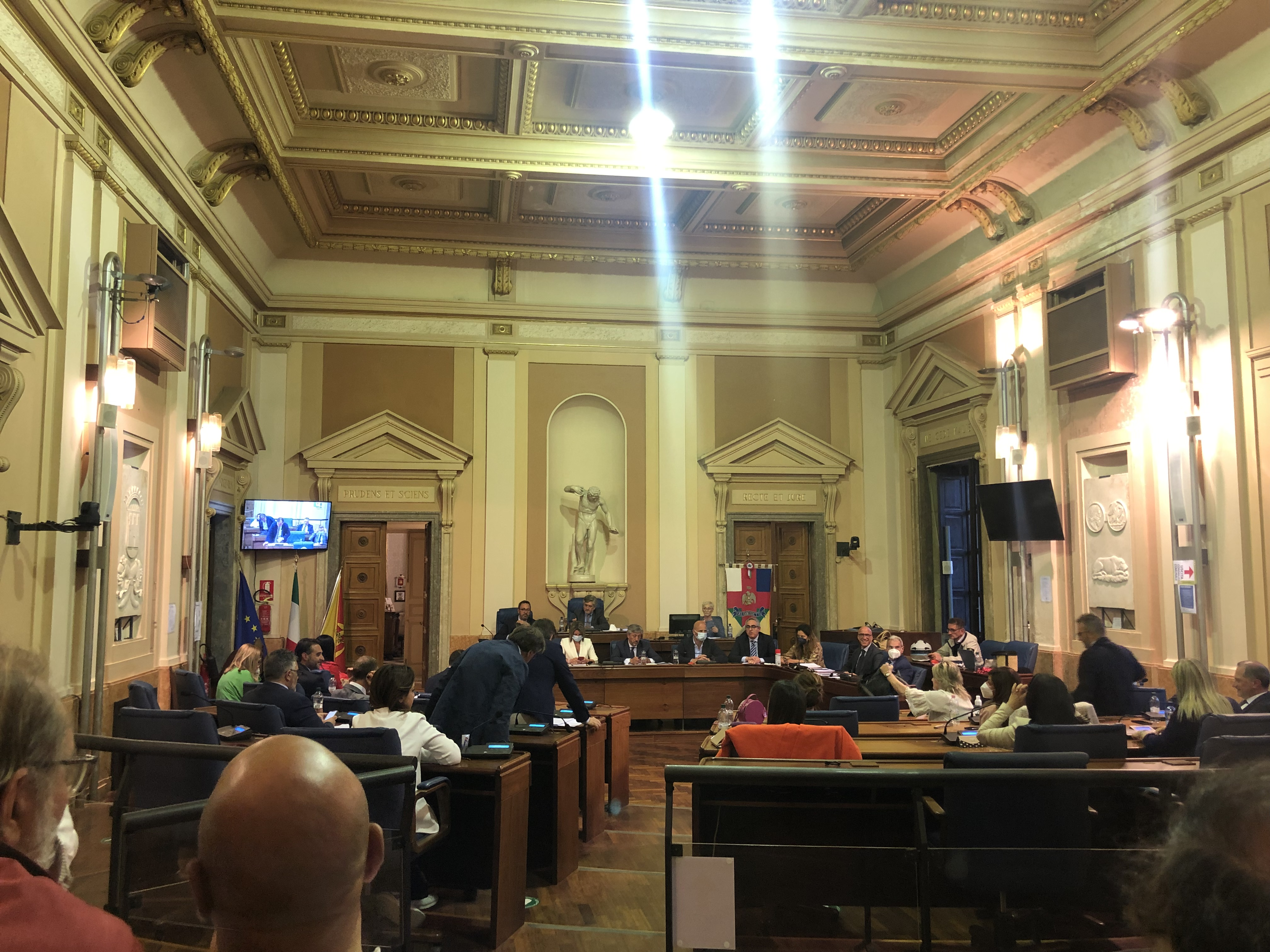
The City Council.

The mayor of Caltanissetta is an elected politician who, along with the City Council, is accountable for the strategic government of Caltanissetta in Sicily, Italy.

The current mayor is Walter Tesauro (FI), who took office on 25 June 2024.

== Overview ==
According to the Italian Constitution, the mayor of Caltanissetta is member of the city council.

The mayor is elected by the population of Caltanissetta, who also elects the members of the city council, controlling the mayor's policy guidelines and is able to enforce his resignation by a motion of no confidence. The mayor is entitled to appoint and release the members of his government.

Since 1993 the mayor is elected directly by Caltanissetta's electorate: in all mayoral elections in Italy in cities with a population higher than 15,000 the voters express a direct choice for the mayor or an indirect choice voting for the party of the candidate's coalition. If no candidate receives at least 50% of votes, the top two candidates go to a second round after two weeks. The election of the city council is based on a direct choice for the candidate with a preference vote: the candidate with the majority of the preferences is elected. The number of the seats for each party is determined proportionally.

== Italian Republic (since 1946) ==
=== City Council election (1946–1993) ===
From 1946 to 1993, the mayor of Caltanissetta was elected by the city council.

	Mayor	Term start	Term end	Party
1	Gabriele Amico Valenti	23 April 1946	17 November 1947	DC
2	Vincenzo Marcenò	27 November 1947	12 July 1948	DC
3	Pietro Restivo	12 July 1948	7 July 1952	DC
4	Carmelo Longo	7 July 1952	9 December 1954	DC
5	Gioacchino Papa	9 December 1954	20 December 1954	PCI
(4)	Carmelo Longo	20 December 1954	24 June 1956	DC
6	Ottavio Rizza	24 June 1956	6 April 1957	DC
7	Calogero Traina	6 April 1957	14 March 1959	DC
8	Francesco Saverio D'Angelo	14 March 1959	16 January 1961	Ind
(7)	Calogero Traina	16 January 1961	10 January 1962	DC
9	Umberto Traina	10 January 1962	19 January 1965	DC
(7)	Calogero Traina	19 January 1965	28 February 1967	DC
10	Piero Oberto	28 February 1967	16 March 1972	DC
11	Raimondo Collodoro	16 March 1972	19 September 1972	DC
12	Giusepe Giliberto	19 September 1972	30 March 1974	DC
13	Giuseppe Sapia	30 March 1974	15 March 1975	DC
(12)	Giuseppe Giliberto	15 March 1975	1 August 1975	DC
14	Vincenzo Assennato	1 August 1975	13 May 1977	DC
15	Aldo Giarratano	13 May 1977	7 August 1980	DC
(12)	Giuseppe Giliberto	7 August 1980	18 May 1982	DC
16	Rudy Maira	18 May 1982	12 July 1984	DC
17	Salvatore Vizzini	12 July 1984	15 July 1985	DC
18	Silvestro Coco	15 July 1985	23 December 1985	DC
19	Massimo Taglialavore	23 December 1985	21 January 1988	DC
(16)	Rudy Maira	21 January 1988	18 June 1990	DC
(15)	Aldo Giarratano	18 June 1990	1 June 1992	DC
–	Onofrio Zaccone, Special Commissioner (1 June 1992 – 6 December 1993)			

=== Direct election (since 1993) ===
Since 1993, under provisions of new local administration law, the mayor of Caltanissetta is chosen by direct election, originally every four, then every five years.

	Mayor	Term start	Term end	Party	Coalition	Election
20	Giuseppe Mancuso	6 December 1993	15 December 1997	MSI	MSI	1993
21	Michele Abbate	15 December 1997	7 May 1999 (Note: Murdered in office.)	AD	PDS • PPI • PRC • AD	1997
Special Prefectural Commissioner tenure (9 May 1999 – 16 December 1999)
22	Salvatore Messana	16 December 1999	15 June 2004	DL; PD	DL • DS • PRC • SDI	1999
22	Salvatore Messana	15 June 2004	25 June 2009	DL; PD	DL • DS • PRC • SDI	2004
23	Michele Campisi	25 June 2009	11 June 2014	PdL	PdL • DC	2009
24	Giovanni Ruvolo	11 June 2014	15 May 2019	PD	PD • UDC	2014
25	Roberto Gambino	15 May 2019	25 June 2024	M5S	M5S	2019
26	Walter Tesauro	25 June 2024	Incumbent	FI	FI • FdI • NM	2024

== Bibliography ==
- Vitellaro, Antonio (2004). I tempi lunghi delle vicende nissene. Riflessioni a margine dell'opera di Giovanni Mulè Bertolo "Caltanissetta nei tempi che furono e nei tempi che sono". Lussografica.
- Candura, Giuseppe (2004). Le 42 città demaniali nella storia di Sicilia. Caltanissetta: Lussografica.
- Santagati, Luigi (1993). Fatti politici di Caltanissetta. Caltanissetta: Paruzzo Editore.
