= Giuseppe Federico =

Italian politician (born 1964)

Member of the Sicilian Regional Assembly
- In office 22 May 2008 – 5 November 2017

President of the Province of Caltanissetta
- In office 17 June 2008 – 15 November 2011
- Preceded by: Filippo Collura
- Succeeded by: Office abolished

Personal details
- Born: 18 March 1964 (age 62) Gela, Province of Caltanissetta, Italy
- Party: Movement for Autonomy; Forza Italia
- Occupation: Physician

Giuseppe "Pino" Federico (born 18 March 1964) is an Italian physician and politician who served as president of the Province of Caltanissetta from 2008 to 2011, and as a member of the Sicilian Regional Assembly from 2008 to 2017.

== Political career ==
Federico began his political career in Gela, serving as a municipal councillor and later as president of the municipal council and assessor.

In the 2008 Sicilian regional election, he was elected to the Sicilian Regional Assembly for the Movement for Autonomy, representing the Caltanissetta constituency with 9,378 preference votes. He was subsequently elected president of the Province of Caltanissetta in the June 2008 provincial election, receiving 63.50% of the vote.

He resigned as president of the province on 15 November 2011 following a dispute over the incompatibility between his regional parliamentary mandate and the provincial presidency. In the 2012 regional election, he was re-elected to the Assembly for the Party of the Sicilians–MpA in the Caltanissetta constituency. During the 16th legislature, he served on the IV Commission for Environment and Territory and joined the Forza Italia parliamentary group on 6 May 2015.

In the 2017 regional election, Federico ran for Forza Italia in the Caltanissetta constituency and received 5,437 preference votes. He was not elected, with the seat going to fellow Forza Italia candidate Michele Mancuso, who received 6,878 votes.
