= Michele Campisi =

Italian politician

Mayor of Caltanissetta
- In office 23 June 2009 – 11 June 2014
- Preceded by: Salvatore Messana
- Succeeded by: Giovanni Ruvolo

Personal details
- Born: 22 April 1963 (age 63) Caltanissetta, Sicily, Italy
- Party: The People of Freedom; New Centre-Right
- Profession: Tax advisor

Michele Campisi (born 22 April 1963 in Caltanissetta) is an Italian politician.

He was a member of the centre-right party The People of Freedom and served as Mayor of Caltanissetta from June 2009 to June 2014.

== Biography ==
He is married to Germana and has two children; he is a former officer with the Carabinieri Legion in Catanzaro. He has taught economics and business courses, served as president of the Association of Young Certified Public Accountants in the province of Caltanissetta, and served as treasurer of the Order.

In addition, for six years until 2008, he served on the Board of Auditors for the Municipality of Caltanissetta.

== See also ==
- 2009 Italian local elections
- List of mayors of Caltanissetta

Political offices
Preceded by Salvatore Messana	Mayor of Caltanissetta; 2009–2014	Succeeded by Giovanni Ruvolo
