= Rabou =

- Commune
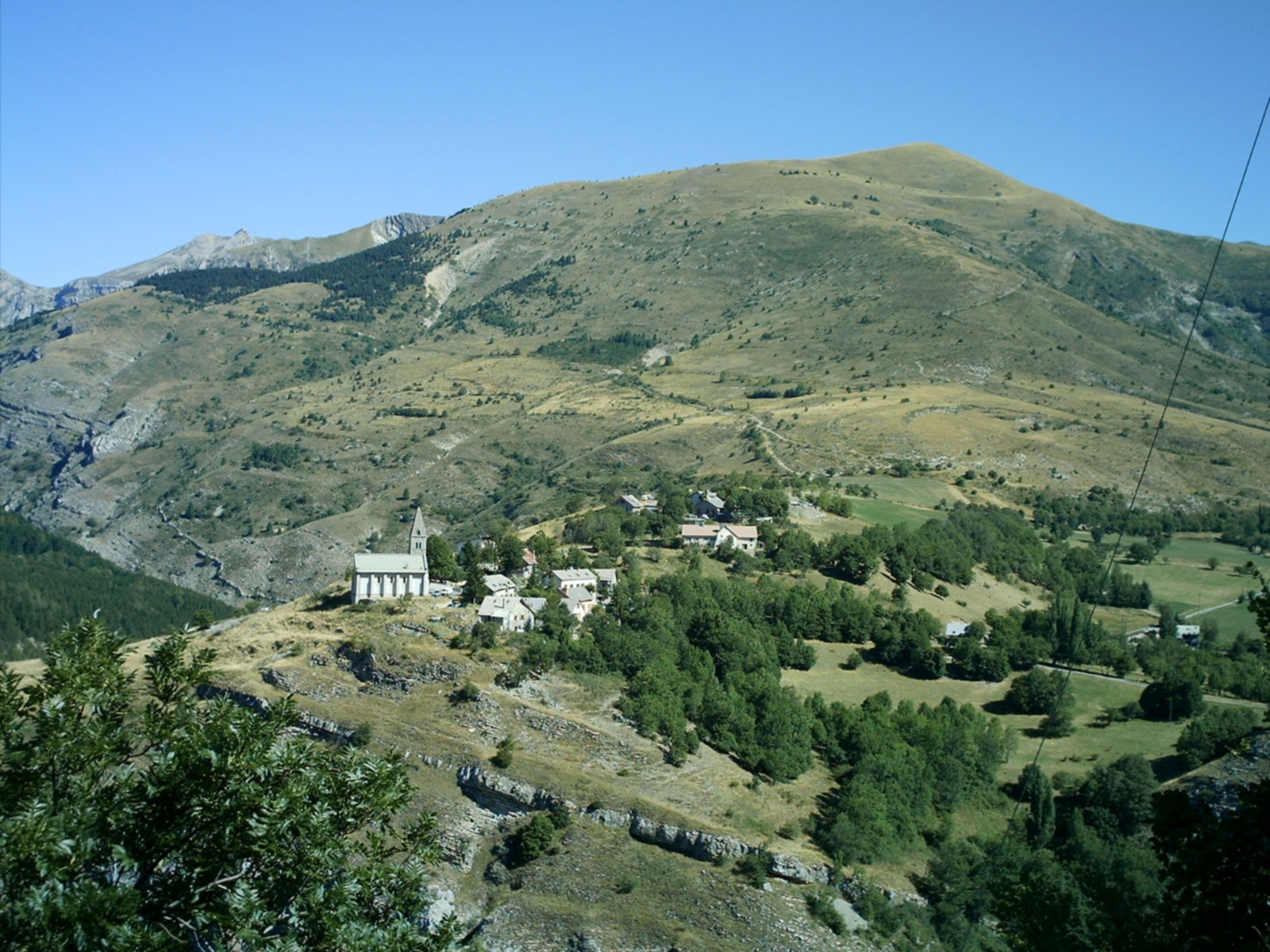
- The village of Rabou and the summit of Puy, at 1,834 m (6,017 ft)
- Location of Rabou
- Location within France Location within Provence-Alpes-Côte d'Azur
- Coordinates: 44°35′30″N 6°00′22″E
- Country: France
- Region: Provence-Alpes-Côte d'Azur
- Department: Hautes-Alpes
- Arrondissement: Gap
- Canton: Veynes
- Intercommunality: Buëch Dévoluy

Government
  - Mayor (2026–32): Marc Marcellin
- Area^{1}: 26.56 km^{2} (10.25 sq mi)
- Elevation: 933 m (3,061 ft)
- Highest elevation: 2,280 m (7,480 ft)
- Lowest elevation: 1,020 m (3,350 ft)
- Population (2023): 89
  - Density: 3.4/km^{2} (8.7/sq mi)
- Time zone: UTC+01:00 (CET)
  - Summer (DST): UTC+02:00 (CEST)
- INSEE/Postal code: 05112 /05400
- ^{1} French Land Register data, which excludes lakes, ponds, glaciers > 1 km^{2} (0.386 sq mi or 247 acres) and river estuaries.

Rabou (French pronunciation: [ʁabu]; Occitan: Rabòu) is a commune in the Hautes-Alpes department in southeastern France.

== Population ==
Historical population
Year	Pop.	±% p.a.
1968	34	—
1975	33	−0.43%
1982	31	−0.89%
1990	46	+5.06%
1999	67	+4.27%
2007	77	+1.75%
2012	78	+0.26%
2017	79	+0.26%
2023	89	+2.01%
Source: INSEE

== See also ==
- Communes of the Hautes-Alpes department
