= Theo H. Siegrist =

American professor

Theo H. Siegrist is an American professor of Biomedical and Chemical Engineering at Florida State University, where he is also affiliated with the National High Magnetic Field Laboratory. A leading researcher in materials characterization with x-ray diffraction and on the structural analysis of crystalline materials, he was selected as a Research Fellow by the Alexander von Humboldt Foundation in Germany in 2008 and an elected Fellow of the American Physical Society in 2006. For over 20 years Siegrist served in a research position at Bell Laboratories. where he made contributions in the fields of intermetallic superconductors and organic semiconductors.
