= Louis Siegriest =

American painter

Louis Bassi Siegriest
- Born: 1899; Oakland, California, U.S.
- Died: November 7, 1989 (aged 89–90); Berkeley, California, U.S.
- Occupation: Painter
- Spouse(s): Mabel Lundy; Edna Stoddart
- Children: Lundy Siegriest

Louis Bassi Siegriest (1899 – November 7, 1989) was an American painter. He was a member of the Society of Six.

== Life ==
Siegriest was born in 1899. He was trained by Frank Van Sloun.

Siegriest established a studio in Oakland, California, where he was a member of the Society of Six alongside Selden Connor Gile, August Gay, Maurice Logan, Bernard von Eichman, and William H. Clapp. He began his career as an Impressionist, and he later became an Abstract Expressionist. He painted Western landscapes, including Nevada ghost towns and cityscapes. He often exhibited his work with his son, Lundy Siegriest, who predeceased him.

Siegriest died on November 7, 1989, in Berkeley, California. According to art historian Nancy Boas, Siegriest was "the grand old man of California art." His artwork can be seen at the Fine Arts Museums of San Francisco, the San Francisco Museum of Modern Art, and the Smithsonian American Art Museum.
