= Charles Siegrist =

American circus performer (1880–1953)

- Born: Charles Patterson; November 14, 1880; Roseburg, Oregon, U.S.
- Died: September 19, 1953 (aged 72); Normal, Illinois, United States
- Other name: Charles Lee Jr.
- Occupations: Trapeze artist; performer
- Employer: Ringling Bros. and Barnum & Bailey Circus
- Known for: Flying trapeze
- Awards: Circus Hall of Fame (1966)

Charles Siegrist (November 14, 1880 – September 19, 1953) was an American trapeze artist who performed for Ringling Brothers and Barnum & Bailey Circus. He was inducted into the Circus Hall of Fame in 1966.

== Early life ==
Charles Patterson, also known as Charles Lee Jr., was born in Roseburg, Oregon, United States, on November 14, 1880.

Orphaned early in life, he was left without parents. Charles, hindered by a speech impediment, was a newspaper hawker and impressed passersby with street acrobatics. By six years old, he began tumbling in the streets of Portland, Oregon. Charles was adopted while a small child by circus proprietor Charles Lee. He was later raised in Canton, Pennsylvania. His adoptive father ran Charles Lee's Great London Circus, based in Canton for the winter seasons.

== Circus life ==
At nine years old, he was recruited as a blackface minstrel show performer in 1890 with the O’Brien Brothers act. Raised in the circus, he started horseback riding under the man who took him in, who featured him as the "boy wonder bareback rider." By 12, he excelled as an equestrian, aerialist, clown, and trick tumbler, performing somersaults atop a galloping horse.

American circus proprietor James Anthony Bailey later offered him a contract to join the Barnum & Bailey Circus in 1898. Following his entry into circus life, he adopted the surname of his trapeze mentor, Toto Siegrist, manager of the Siegrist-Silbon troupe. He toured Europe with Barnum & Bailey at the turn of the century. During the tour, he performed before Queen Victoria and Kaiser Wilhelm II. In 1903, after Barnum & Bailey's European tour, he was brought back to America and hailed as one of the world's most astounding aerialists. Relocating to New York City, he was featured at the Barnum & Bailey Circus and later Ringling Brothers and Barnum & Bailey Circus for 20 years.

With a troupe of aerialists, Charles formed his own flying trapeze act. The routine, hailed in 1908 as the greatest aerial act of its day, featured complex somersaults and mid-air transfers between trapezes.

By 1909, Siegrist became a sensation in both New York City and the circus industry. As a young man, he was the only person to accomplish a double somersault from the floor without the aid of mechanical equipment. A few years later, Siegrist performed six backward somersaults on a galloping horse. He completed them during a single lap around the ring.

While Barnum & Bailey was in winter quarters in 1910, he went on an independent tour. One stop was in Columbus, Ohio, at the Aladdin Shrine Circus.

On April 4, 1931, Siegrist was injured during a performance of the Ringling Brothers show at Madison Square Garden in New York City, as 10,000 people witnessed the accident. When the Siegrist Troupe was introduced, he ascended to his high perch in the Garden. On his first swing, he lost his grip and fell. The fall from the trapeze left him with a broken neck and fractured leg, and doctors declared his career finished. While he recovered at Polyclinic Hospital, Alfredo Codona visited daily and foresaw his comeback. After nearly fourteen weeks in a cast and two years of recovery, he performed again.

Billed as "the daring young man on the flying trapeze," he appeared with the Hagenbeck–Wallace Circus in 1935 at 51. His somersaults, pirouettes, and twisters still showed the same grace and precision that had defined his career three decades earlier.

He left performing around 1947 due to a shoulder injury from a trapeze accident.

== Personal life ==
Charles, then 26, met 16-year-old Edith when both joined the Barnum & Bailey Show. Coming from aerialist families and small circuses, they were cast together in a twenty-member act. They fell in love the first season and married before the next. He and his wife had three sons—Joe, Charles Jr., and William.

== Death ==
Charles Siegrist died at 72 years old on September 19, 1953, in Normal, Illinois, United States.

== Legacy ==
Known as the "world's foremost all-around circus performer," he earned fame for his trapeze work. He was credited with the first-ever two and a half somersaults from trapeze to catch. He gained recognition for executing feet-to-feet twirls in both directions and somersaulting under a three-foot table.

The Charles Siegrist Showmen's Club in Canton was named after the veteran circus aerialist.

Siegrist was inducted into the International Circus Hall of Fame in 1966.
