= Lundy Siegriest =

American painter (1925–1985)

- Born: 1925; Oakland, California, U.S.
- Died: November 13, 1985 (aged 59–60); Berkeley, California, U.S.
- Education: California College of the Arts
- Occupation: Painter
- Parent: Louis Siegriest
- Relatives: Edna Stoddart (stepmother)

Lundy Siegriest (1925 - November 13, 1985) was an American painter.

== Life ==
Siegriest was born in 1925 in Oakland, California. His father, Louis Siegriest, was a painter, as was his stepmother, Edna Stoddart. Siegriest graduated from the California College of the Arts in Oakland.

Siegriest became a painter in his own right. He was initially a realist and later became an abstract expressionist. He returned to realism after being injured in a fall. He painted Western landscapes en plein air, and he often exhibited his work with his father.

Siegriest died of cancer on November 13, 1985, in Berkeley, California, at age 60. His work can be seen at the Fine Arts Museum of San Francisco, the Oakland Museum of California, and the Whitney Museum of American Art in New York City.
