= Giovanni Ruvolo =

Italian biologist and politician

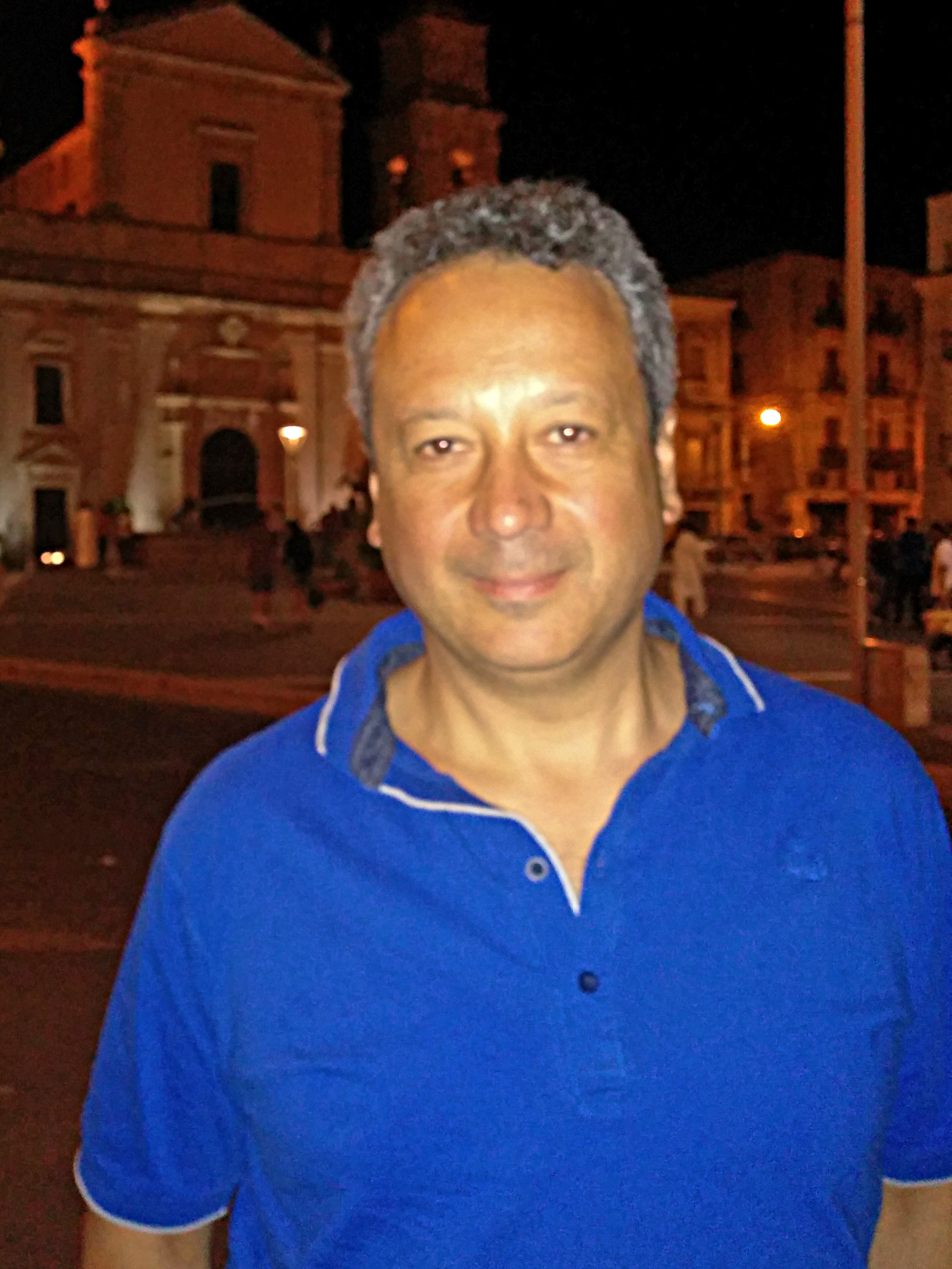

Mayor of Caltanissetta
- In office 11 June 2014 – 15 May 2019
- Preceded by: Michele Campisi
- Succeeded by: Roberto Gambino

Personal details
- Born: 8 May 1966 (age 60) Caltanissetta, Sicily, Italy
- Party: Independent (centre-left)
- Education: University of Palermo
- Profession: biologist

Giovanni Ruvolo (born 8 May 1966 in Caltanissetta) is an Italian biologist and politician.

He ran for Mayor of Caltanissetta as an independent at the 2014 Italian local elections and he was elected on 11 June 2014.

== See also ==
- 2014 Italian local elections
- List of mayors of Caltanissetta

Political offices
Preceded by Michele Campisi	Mayor of Caltanissetta; 2014–2019	Succeeded by Roberto Gambino
