= Felix Ruvolo =

American painter

- Born: 1912; New York City, U.S.
- Died: October 10, 1992 (aged 79–80)
- Education: Art Institute of Chicago
- Occupation: Painter

Felix Ruvolo (1912 - October 10, 1992) was an American painter. He was born in New York City and grew up in Sicily, Italy, where he was raised by his grandparents. He returned to the United States, where he studied at the Art Institute of Chicago. He became a professional painter and began exhibiting his artwork, first in Chicago and later in California. His artwork can be seen at the Museo ItaloAmericano in San Francisco, the Illinois State Museum, and the Art Institute of Chicago.
