= Selden Connor Gile =

American painter (1877–1947)

- Selden Connor Gile in his twenties.
- Born: March 20, 1877; Stow, Maine
- Died: June 8, 1947 (aged 70); San Rafael, California
- Known for: Painting

Selden Connor Gile (20 March 1877 – 8 June 1947) was an American painter who was mainly active in northern California between the early 1910s and the mid-1930s. He was the founder and leader of the Society of Six, a Bay Area group of artists known for their plein-air paintings and rich use of color, a quality that would later figure into the work of Bay Area figurative expressionists.

== Style ==
Though self-taught as a painter, Gile was most influenced in this exuberant use of color by the Fauves as well as the early French Impressionist paintings he saw at the Panama–Pacific International Exposition of 1915. It was those paintings that prompted a "dramatic change" from his early muted colors to those of his most successful period in the 1920s. In the mid-twenties, local exhibitions of European art added the Post-Impressionists and the Blue Four to the list of painters and paintings that had an influence on Gile's work.

Most of Gile's paintings until about 1927 are small canvases featuring California landscapes and coastline. Stylistically, along with the aforementioned vivid colors, Gile would use thick paint, "...applying loose, expressive brushstrokes of varying sizes." Rarely did his paintings contain people; instead "...Gile invested the contours of the land with sensual qualities others might save for depicting people." As opposed to the Impressionists, who would frequently return to the scene of a painting or do much of their work in the studio, Gile, along with the other Society of Six artists, preferred to complete paintings outdoors, usually in one sitting.

== Early life ==
Selden Connor Gile was born on 20 March 1877 in Stow, Maine. He was the youngest of six children born to farmer James Henry Gile and his wife Ellen Alice Bemis, who named him after the then-Governor of Maine, Seldon Connor. Though his siblings were boisterous, Gile "...was a temperate boy and notably shy with women. Like his brother Ellsworth, he displayed a love of nature, an indefatigable energy as a hiker, and a colorful imagination." After completing high school in Fryeburg in 1894, Gile went to live with his elder brother Frank. While there, he attended and graduated from Shaw's Business College in 1899. Following his graduation, Gile worked several jobs until General Marshall Wentworth, his father's commanding officer in the Union Army, set him up to work as a paymaster and clerk at a friend's ranch in Rocklin, California. The artist arrived on the west coast in either 1901 or 1903. Before he left, however, he painted what is considered his earliest known painting, a small New England landscape called Farm Scene dated 1900.

== Career ==
Though Gile was steadily employed at jobs other than art until the age of 50, his artistic output, primarily from marathon weekends spent painting, was considerable. 1915, the year of the Panama–Pacific International Exposition, marked the beginning of his maturation as an artist, despite the fact that Gile and the Society of Six would not exhibit their art beyond a few occasional paintings until 1923. From their first exhibition at the Oakland Art Gallery on March 11, 1923 to the sixth and final show as a group in 1928, Gile and the Society of Six were generally well received by critics. In the spring of 1927, Gile quit his job as an office manager for Gladding, McBean and Company and moved from his cabin on Chabot Road in Oakland (also known as the "Chow House" where the Society of Six would meet on weekends), into a cottage he had kept since the early 1920s on San Francisco Bay in Tiburon, Marin County to paint full-time.

September 1927 saw Gile's first solo show at the Northbrae Community Center in Berkeley, followed in 1928 by a flurry of other exhibitions including shows at the Galerie Beaux Arts in San Francisco and the Oakland Art Gallery. Despite an optimistic outlook and positive critical notices, after his move from the "Chow House", he was visited less frequently by his fellow painters. That, combined with the effects of the Great Depression, and Gile's sometimes excessive drinking, caused the Society of Six to move apart as a group. Though the artist remained active, changes in the art scene brought on by forces that included the economy, made his art less relevant. Gile's last major solo exhibition during his lifetime took place at the Paul Elder Gallery in May 1930.

== Later years ==
Selden Gile continued to paint and exhibited in various group shows every year until 1937. During the 1930s, the number of his oil paintings declined in favor of watercolors. Another change likely brought on by the mood around the Great Depression was to include more people, particularly workers, in his paintings. Despite his discomfort with larger formats, Gile took on the town of Belvedere's only WPA mural commission, painting a mural for the public library, where he served as a part-time librarian. Towards the end of his life, unable to pay his rent, Gile took on another mural commission, this time for a railroad office in San Francisco. He is remembered from his time in the Tiburon/Belvedere area:

"...as a loner, independent, and very proud. [Gile] enjoyed cordial relationships with some of his neighbors, often chatting with them on the street or in doorways, but he consistently refused their hospitality...In the end Gile was a sick, alcoholic old man surrounded by paintings he never sold, lonely, and not painting. The process of painting and camaraderie that he had enjoyed were past now."

A few months before he died, Selden Gile checked himself into the Marin County Hospital and Farm, where he spent the rest of his life. On June 8, 1947, Gile died of cirrhosis of the liver.

== Works ==
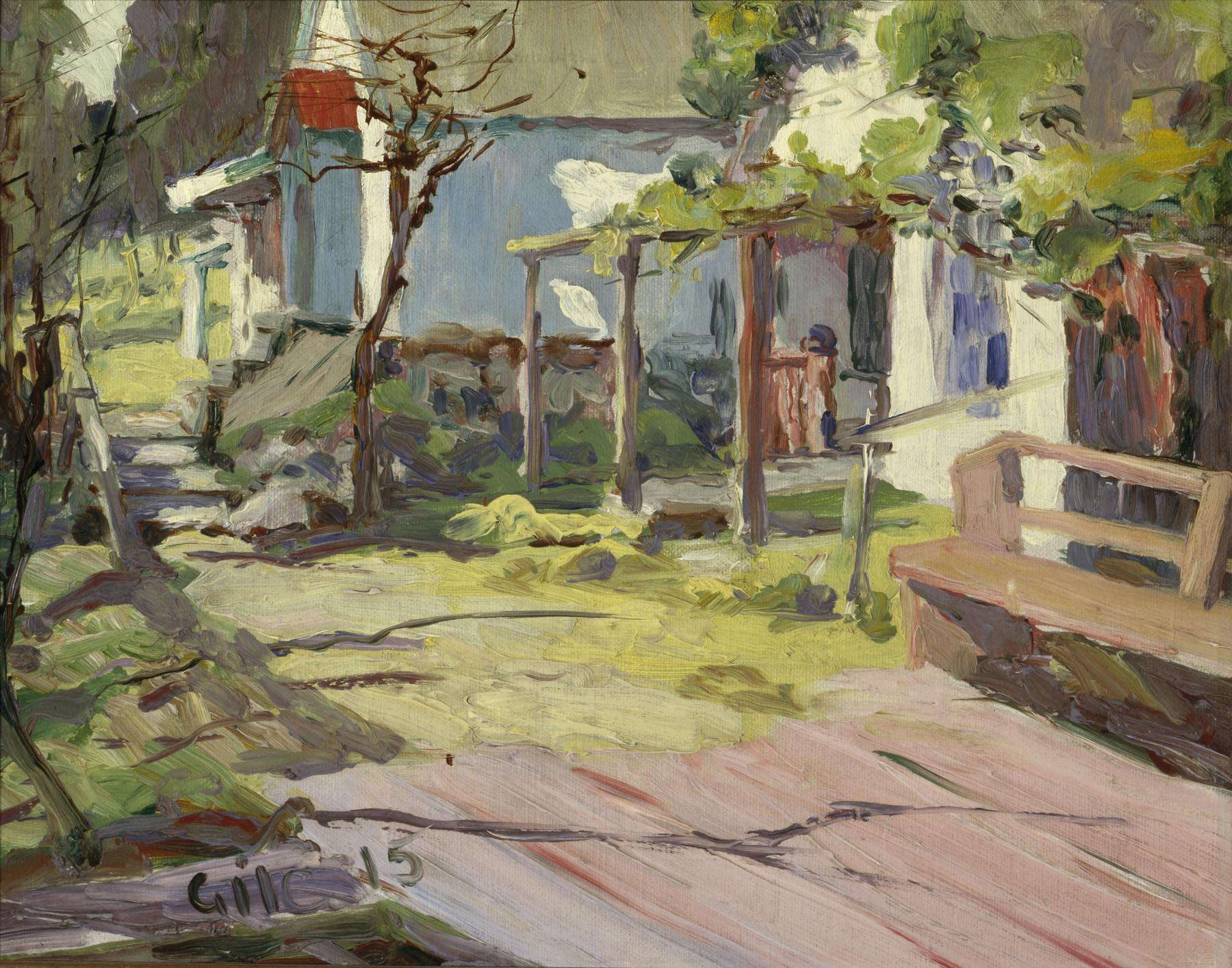
Joaquin Miller Home, 1915, oil on canvas, Oakland Museum of California

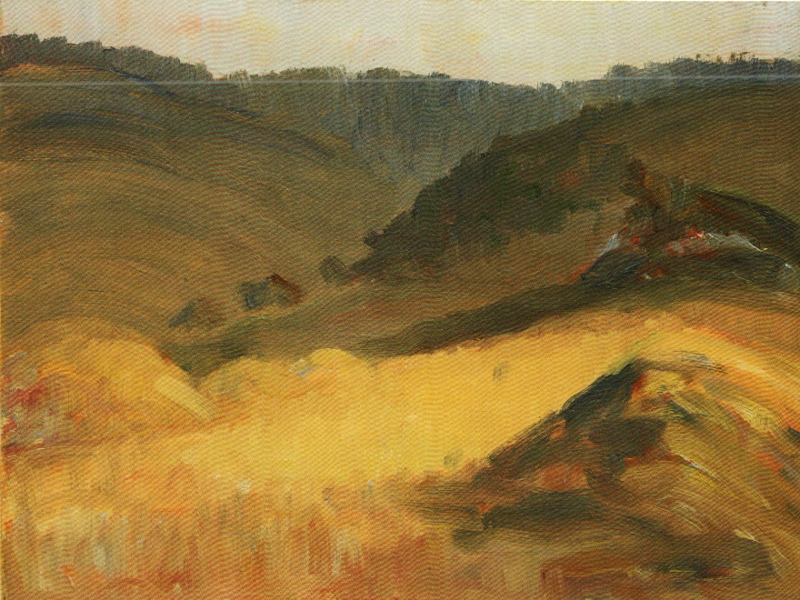
Golden Meadow, 1917-1919, oil on canvas

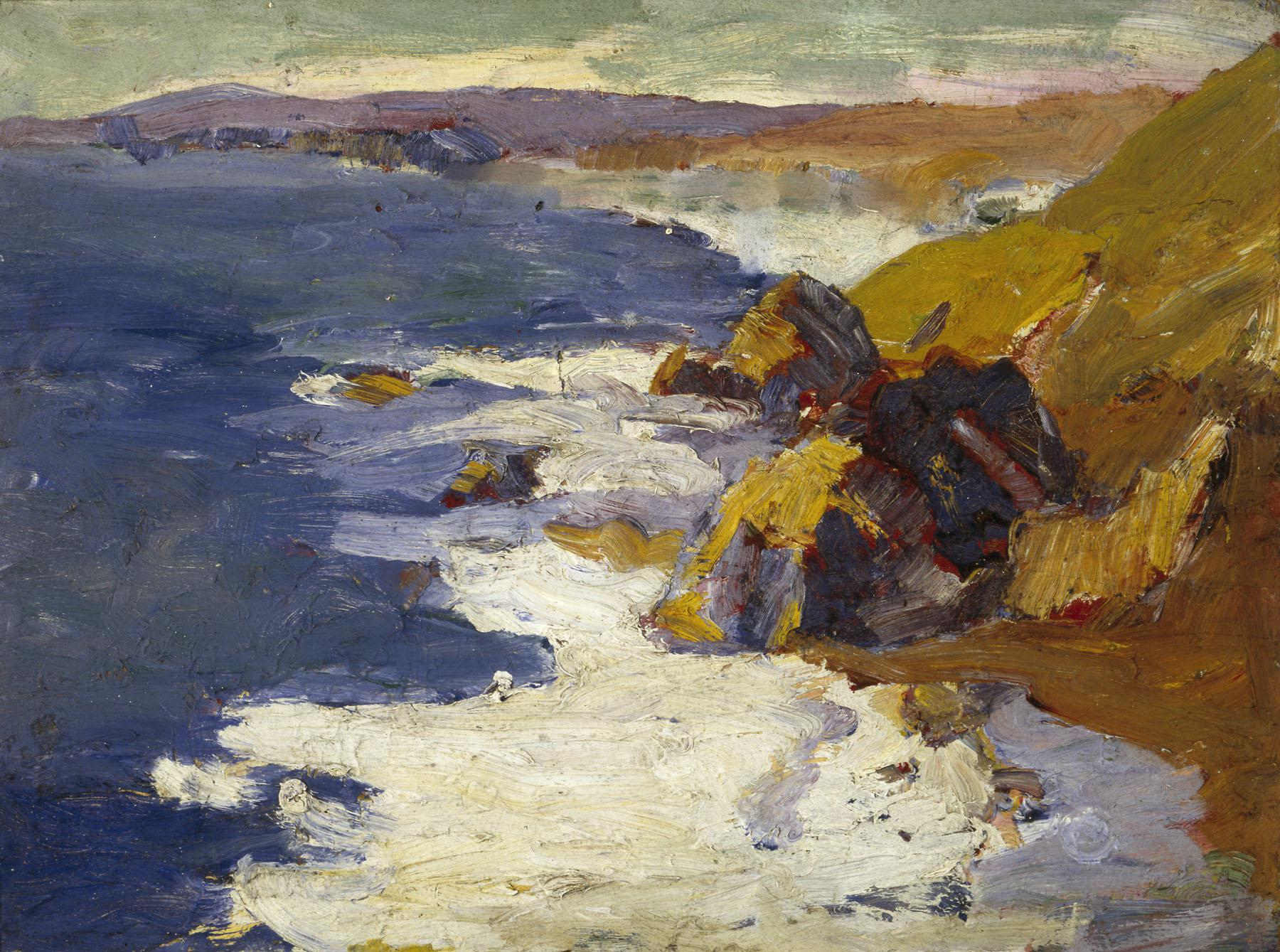
Stinson Beach, 1919, oil on cardboard

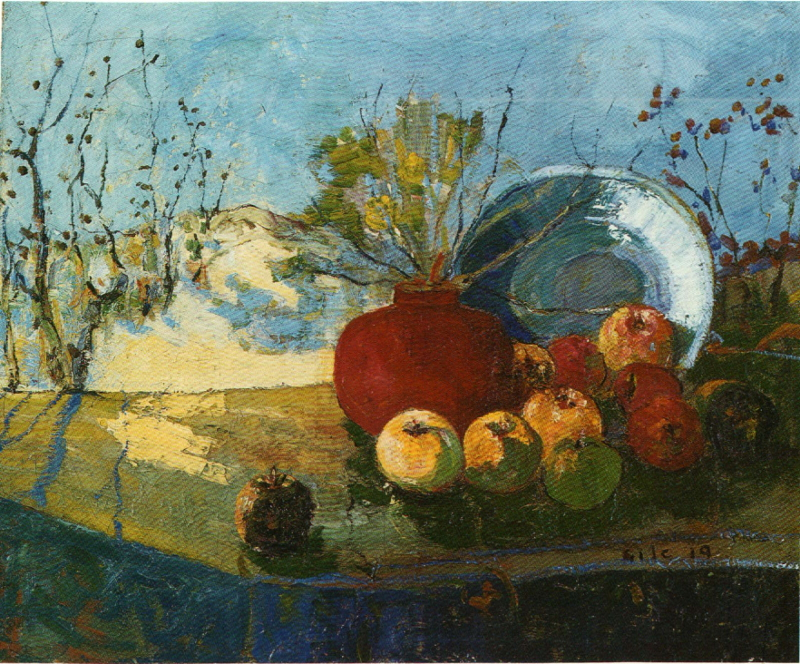
Still Life with Trees and Mountain, 1919, oil on canvas

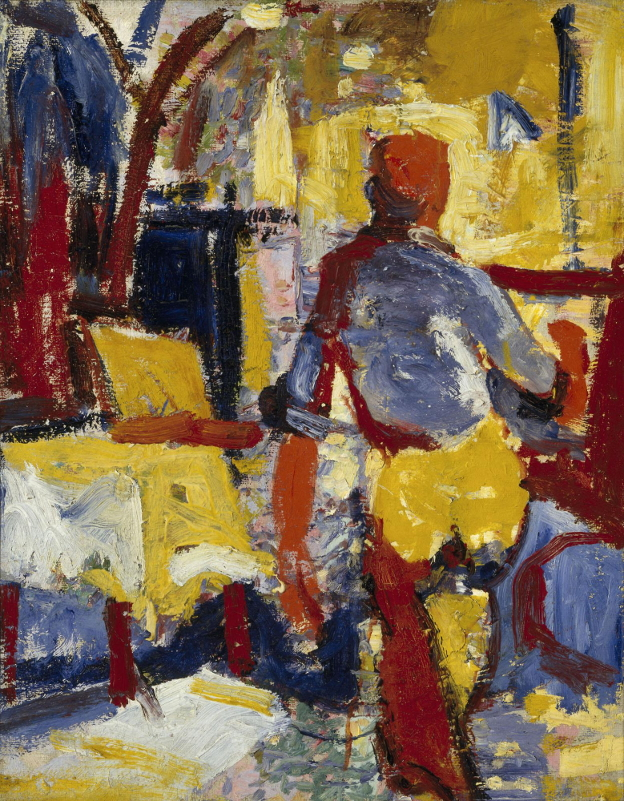
Red Von Eichman, 1920, oil on canvas

== Sources ==
- Boas, Nancy. (1988). The Society of Six: The California Colorists. San Francisco, CA: Bedford Art Publishers. ISBN 0-938491-04-0
- Gerdts, William H. (1984). American Impressionism. New York: Artabras. ISBN 0-89660-001-7
- Moure, Nancy Dustin Wall (1998). California Art: 450 Years of Painting & Other Media. Los Angeles, CA: Dustin Publications. ISBN 0-961462-24-8
- Neff, Emily Ballew (2006). The Modern West: American landscapes, 1890-1950. New Haven: Yale University Press. ISBN 0-300114-48-6
