= The Man in the Suit =

The Man in the Suit may refer to:

- "The Man in the Black Suit", a 1994 short story by Stephen King
- The Man in the Brown Suit, a 1924 novel by Agatha Christie
- The Man in the Funny Suit, a 1960 television drama
- The Man in the Gray Flannel Suit (novel), a 1955 novel by Sloan Wilson
  - The Man in the Gray Flannel Suit, a 1956 film based on the novel
  - The Man in the Gray Flannel Suit II, the 1984 sequel to the Wilson novel
- The Man in the White Suit, a 1951 movie starring Alec Guinness
  - The Man in the White Suit (play), a 2019 play by Sean Foley based on the film
- John Reese (Person of Interest), a character from the television series Person of Interest
- The Man in the Suit (web series), an analog horror web series by YouTuber Unknowingly
