= A Summer Place =

A Summer Place may refer to:

- A Summer Place (novel), 1958, by Sloan Wilson
- A Summer Place (film), a 1959 American romantic drama film based on the novel
  - "Theme from A Summer Place", a 1959 song written for the film
