= The Horse in the Gray Flannel Suit =

1968 film by Norman Tokar

- Theatrical release poster by Paul Wenzel
- Directed by: Norman Tokar
- Written by: Eric Hatch (book); Louis Pelletier
- Produced by: Winston Hibler
- Starring: Dean Jones; Diane Baker; Lloyd Bochner; Fred Clark; Morey Amsterdam; Kurt Russell; Ellen Janov
- Cinematography: William E. Snyder
- Edited by: Robert Stafford
- Music by: George Bruns
- Production company: Walt Disney Productions
- Distributed by: Buena Vista Distribution Co., Inc.
- Release date: December 20, 1968
- Running time: 113 minutes
- Country: United States
- Language: English
- Box office: $3.3 million (US/ Canada rentals)

The Horse in the Gray Flannel Suit is a 1968 American comedy film directed by Norman Tokar, with a screenplay by Louis Pelletier, and starring Dean Jones, Diane Baker, Ellen Janov, Kurt Russell, Lurene Tuttle and Fred Clark in his final film role. It is based on the 1965 book The Year of the Horse by Eric Hatch. The film's title is a humorous reference to the titular horse's color and the title of the 1955 Sloan Wilson novel (and 1956 film) about the American search for purpose in a world dominated by business, The Man in the Gray Flannel Suit.

The feature failed at the box office, and it received mostly negative reviews for its predictable script. The film was paired with the animated featurette Winnie the Pooh and the Blustery Day in its original theatrical release.

== Plot ==
Madison Avenue advertising executive Fred Bolton, a Lakeville, Connecticut widower living beyond his means, is beset by two major problems. His boss has instructed him to devise an original campaign in just 24 hours to promote their client Allied Drug & Food's over-the-counter indigestion medication, Aspercel. Allied's chairman Tom Dugan wants a "jet set" appeal campaign that will "give sour stomachs class and dignity".

Fred's other problem is his teenage daughter Helen, who loves horses, takes riding classes and has competed. She dreams of having her own horse but knows that the family cannot afford one and that her father is allergic to horses.

Fred has an idea to solve both problems at once: he will acquire a good horse, name it Aspercel and publicize the horse while Helen rides it. Helen and the horse must first win a few prizes to make the horse a celebrated figure. Fred enlists the help of Helen's riding instructor Suzie, and is assisted by teenager Ronny Gardner, who is smitten with Helen.

Helen wins some ribbons, but the resulting publicity is below Dugan's expectations. When Helen learns that her father's job is at stake, she falters under pressure and fails to win an important show. Suzie realizes Aspercel's potential when the horse carries Fred over a seven-foot wall and away from a police car. She volunteers to ride Aspercel in the Washington International Horse Show and recruits her wealthy friend and equestrian Archer Madison as a trainer. After a close competition with the reigning champion, Suzie and Aspercel win the championship. Fred is rewarded with a promotion and Suzie's love.

== Cast ==
- Dean Jones as Frederick "Fred" Bolton
- Diane Baker as Suzie "S.J." Clemens
- Lloyd Bochner as Archer Madison
- Fred Clark as Tom Dugan
- Ellen Janov as Helen Bolton
- Morey Amsterdam as Charlie Blake
- Kurt Russell as Ronnie Gardner
- Lurene Tuttle as Aunt Martha
- Alan Hewitt as Harry Tomes
- Frederico Piñero as Lorendo
- Florence MacMichael as Catherine
- Joan Marshall as Mimsey
- Robin Eccles as Judy Gardner
- Adam Williams as Sergeant Roberts
- Norman Grabowski as Truck Driver

== See also ==
- The Man in the Gray Flannel Suit
- List of films about horses
- List of American films of 1968
