= Mission Ranch =

Historic hotel in California

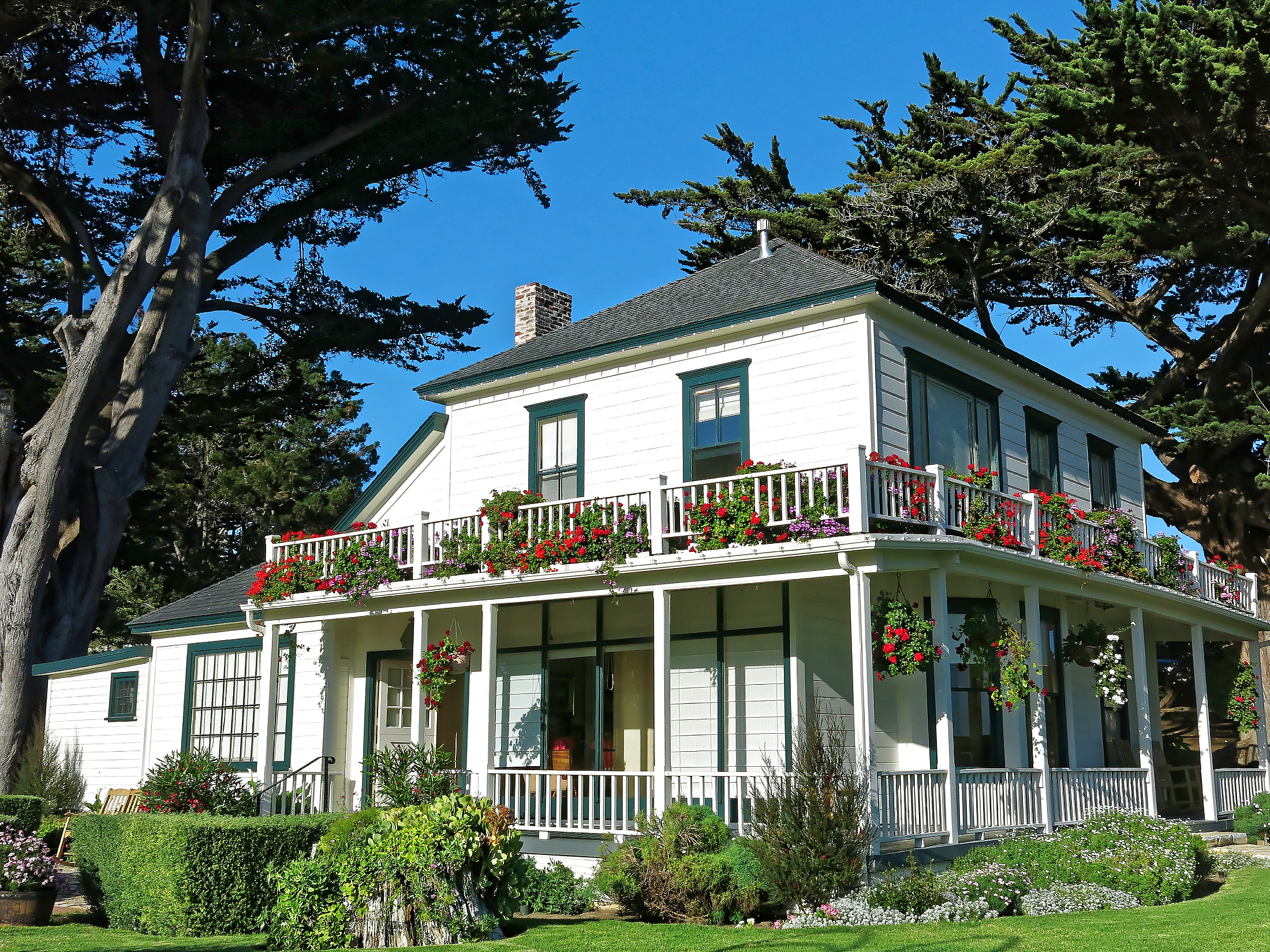
- Mission Ranch, Carmel.
- Interactive map of Mission Ranch
- 36°32′30.912″N 121°55′23.9016″W
- Location: 26270 Dolores Street, Carmel, California, US

History
- Built: 1852
- Built for: John Martin
- Rebuilt: 1986

Site notes
- Owner: Clint Eastwood
- Website: missionranchcarmel.com

Mission Ranch is a historic hotel and restaurant in Monterey County, California, United States. It is located in the unincorporated Mission Tract just south of the incorporated city of Carmel-by-the-Sea, California, near the Carmel Mission, at 26270 Dolores Street. The property was bought in 1986 by Clint Eastwood, who restored the premises in the style of the original buildings. The hotel has 31 rooms located within ten buildings on the property.

== History ==
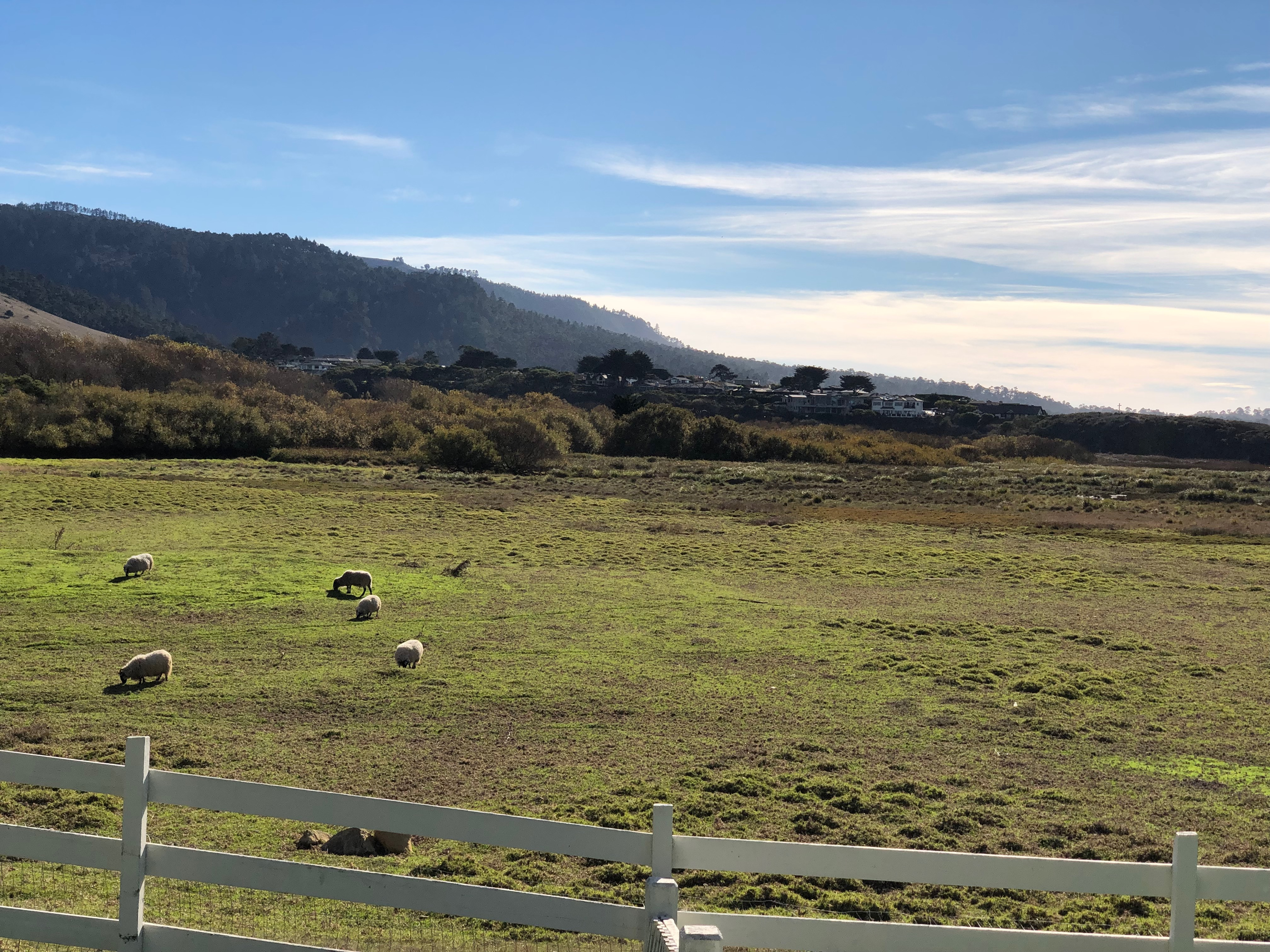
Mission Ranch meadow land with sheep grazing

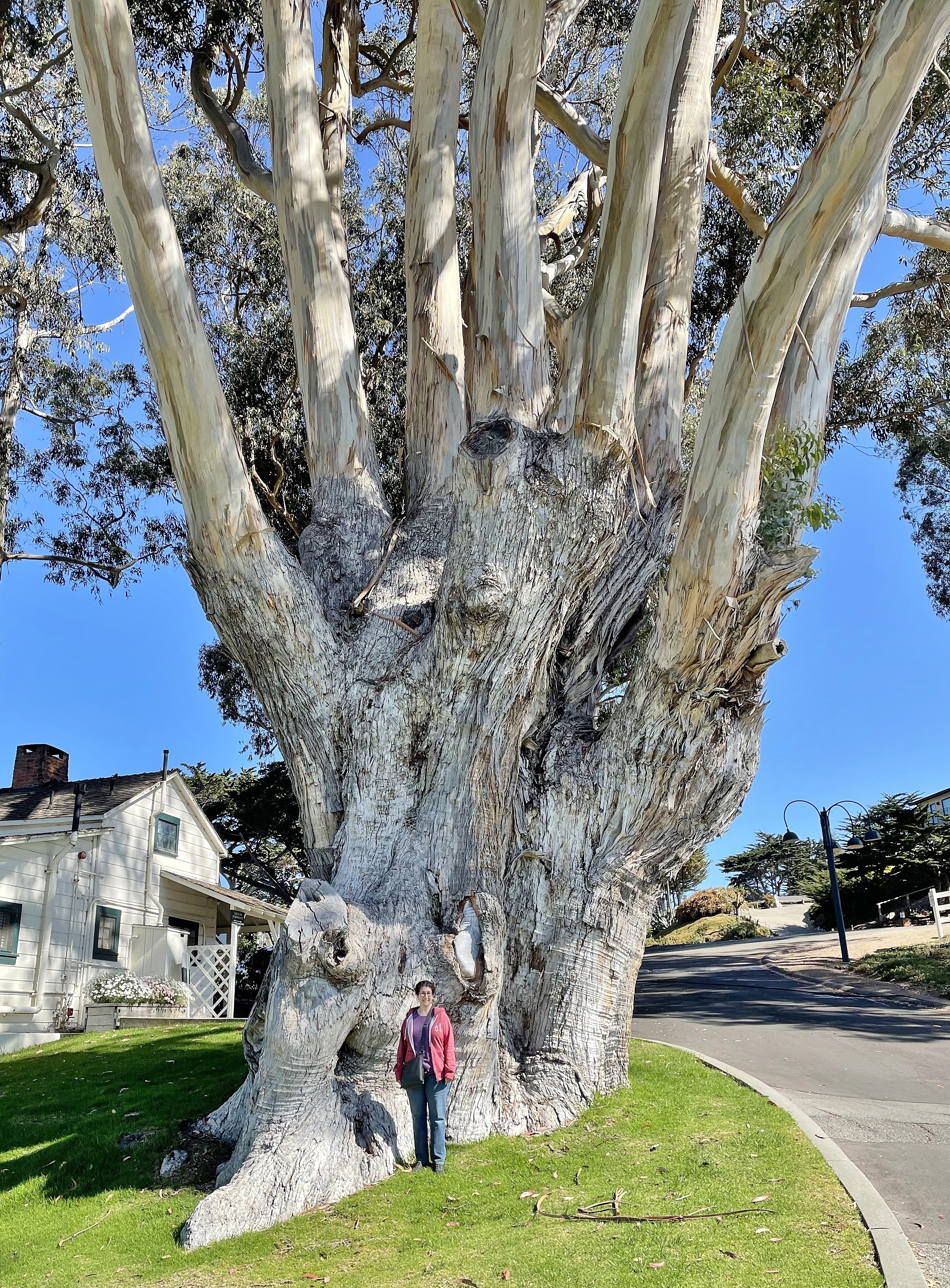
Eucalyptus tree dating back to late 1800s at Mission Ranch (June 2022)

W. J. Curtis built a creamery at the ranch in 1897. The owner retired from the dairy business in 1917 and put 65 cows up for auction.

Carmel Martin, the youngest of the Martin boys, sold the ranch on August 23, 1929, to millionaire tycoon Willis J. Walker of Pebble Beach, who was chairman of the Red River Lumber Company.

Clint Eastwood bought the ranch in 1986, rescuing it from a condominium development. He restored the property in the style of the original buildings. Buildings on the property reflect the architectural period of the 1850s, that includes the restaurant and dance barn and the century old Martin farmhouse and bunkhouse.

In the 1959 movie A Summer Place, with characters Ken Jorgenson (Richard Egan) and Sylvia (Dorothy McGuire) have a beach house, which was filmed at the Clinton Walker House with scenes filmed at a cottage located at Mission Ranch Hotel and Restaurant.

== See also ==
- Timeline of Carmel-by-the-Sea, California
