= Alden R. Hatch =

American writer (1898–1975)

Alden Hatch
- Born: Alden Ruggles Hatch; September 16, 1898; New York City, United States
- Died: February 1, 1975 (aged 76); Sarasota, Florida, U.S.
- Occupations: Writer, biographer
- Spouse(s): 1) Ruth Brown; 2) Allene Pomeroy Gaty
- Children: Evelyn, Denison (Denny) Hatch
- Relatives: Eric S. Hatch (brother)
- Writing career
- Genres: Biography, Nonfiction
- Notable works: Crown of Glory, The life of Pope Pius XII, H.R.H.Prince Bernhard of the Netherlands: An authorized biography, Buckminster Fuller At Home In The Universe, The Wadsworths of the Genesee, 'The Mountbattens:The Last Royal Success Story' (pub: Random House NY 1965;

Alden R. Hatch (September 26, 1898 – February 1, 1975) was an American writer. He was the son of May D. Hatch and Frederic H. Hatch, owner of a successful Wall Street stock brokerage firm he founded in 1888. Alden's brother, Eric S. Hatch, was a writer on the staff of The New Yorker and a novelist and screenwriter best known for his book 1101 Park Avenue that became a hit film under the title My Man Godfrey.

Born in New York City, Alden Hatch was the author of more than 40 books. A number of his works chronicled the lives of a variety of high-profile individuals such as Pope Pius XII, Pope John XXIII, Brother André, Charles de Gaulle, Prince Bernhard, Glenn Curtiss, Dwight D. Eisenhower, Mamie Eisenhower, George S. Patton, Wendell Willkie, Woodrow Wilson and Edith Bolling Wilson, Clare Boothe Luce, Buckminster Fuller and what Hatch described as a "novelized biography" of Franklin Roosevelt. A fan of Thoroughbred horse racing, in 1938 he collaborated with Foxhall Keene on a biography of the late James R. Keene, the renowned horseman and owner of Castleton Farm.

Hatch wrote several books on his friend, Dwight Eisenhower, and his official biography was used by the General during his 1952 presidential campaign. Hatch also co-authored The Circus Kings with Henry Ringling North.

Alden Hatch was first married in 1932 to Ruth Brown, they divorced in 1949 and in 1950 he remarried to Miss Allene Pomeroy Gaty.

Alden Hatch is the father of Denison (Denny) Hatch, a copywriting expert, author, and former editor-in-chief of Target Marketing magazine.

For a number of years, Alden Hatch lived in his parents' home in Cedarhurst, Long Island. Following a brief illness, he died at age seventy-six at his winter home in Sarasota, Florida.

Alden Hatch's personal typist for many years was Ruth Townsend of Cedarhurst New York. She began typing Mr. Hatch's manuscripts in her home in Cedarhurst in the early 1950s, and continued typing his books into the 1970s. When Mr. Hatch moved from Cedarhurst, New York to Sarasota, Florida, Ruth Townsend continued to type his manuscripts that were mailed from Florida to New York. (from Stockton Townsend, son of Ruth Townsend)

Alden Hatch's papers and those of his wife Allene reside in the Department of Special and Area Studies Collections at the University of Florida's George A. Smathers Libraries. A guide is available here.
