= A Summer Place (film) =

1959 film by Delmer Daves

- Film poster
- Directed by: Delmer Daves
- Written by: Delmer Daves
- Based on: A Summer Place by Sloan Wilson
- Produced by: Delmer Daves
- Starring: Richard Egan; Dorothy McGuire; Troy Donahue; Sandra Dee; Arthur Kennedy; Constance Ford
- Cinematography: Harry Stradling
- Edited by: Owen Marks
- Music by: Max Steiner
- Production company: Warner Bros. Pictures
- Distributed by: Warner Bros. Pictures
- Release date: November 18, 1959 (United States)
- Running time: 130 minutes
- Country: United States
- Language: English

A Summer Place is a 1959 American romantic drama film based on Sloan Wilson's 1958 novel of the same name, about teenage lovers from different classes who get back together 20 years later, and then must deal with the passionate love affair of their own teenage children by previous marriages. Delmer Daves directed the film, which stars Richard Egan and Dorothy McGuire as a couple, and Sandra Dee and Troy Donahue as their respective children. The film contains a memorable instrumental theme composed by Max Steiner, which spent nine weeks at number one on the Billboard Hot 100 singles chart in 1960.

== Plot ==
Alcoholic Bart Hunter (Arthur Kennedy), his long-suffering wife Sylvia (Dorothy McGuire) and their teenage son Johnny (Troy Donahue) operate a crumbling inn on Pine Island off the Maine coast. Bart receives a reservation request from an old acquaintance, Ken Jorgenson (Richard Egan), who was a lowly lifeguard on the island twenty years ago but is now a millionaire research chemist. Ken wants to bring his wife and daughter to the island for the summer. Bart wants to refuse the reservation, but Sylvia insists that he accept because they badly need the money.

Ken arrives with his wife Helen (Constance Ford) and teenage daughter Molly (Sandra Dee). As it turns out, Ken and Sylvia were teenaged lovers twenty years previously. They had broken up because Ken was a poor college student while Bart was the son of a rich, established family, so Sylvia married Bart, and Ken, after seeing Sylvia's wedding announcement in the newspaper, married Helen. Both marriages were unhappy, but Ken and Sylvia stayed in them because of their love for their respective children, Molly and Johnny. Ken and Sylvia find themselves drawn to each other again and begin secretly meeting every night. They are soon spotted by the island's night watchman, who informs Helen. Helen initially keeps quiet, planning to catch them in the act to ensure a large divorce settlement.

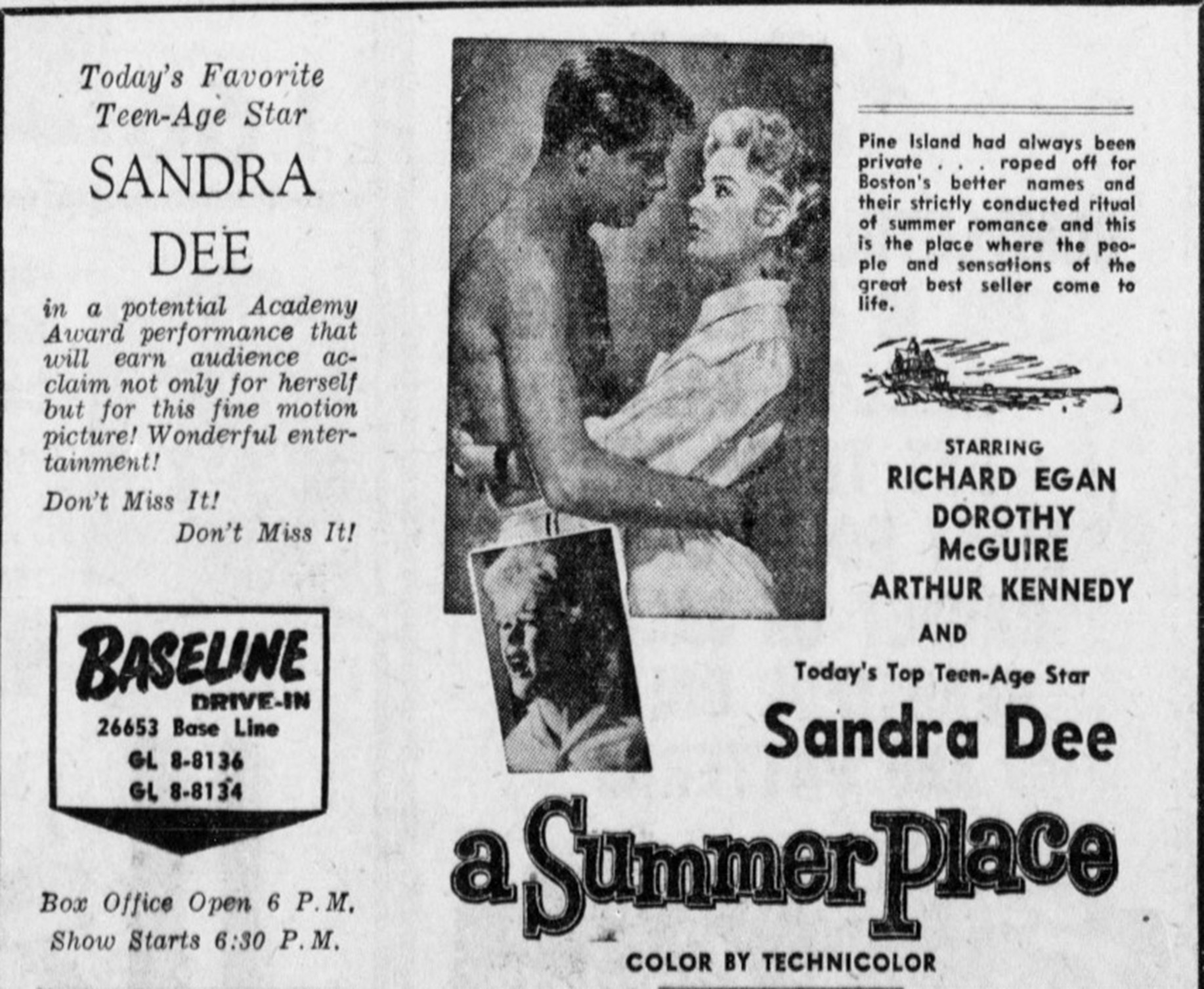
Drive-in advertisement from 1959

Ken goes on a weekend business trip, during which time Molly and Johnny, with Ken's permission, go sailing around the island. Their boat capsizes in rough water, stranding them on the beach overnight. The Coast Guard rescues them the next day. Helen is suspicious that the teens had sex on the beach, although they deny it. In a fit of anger, Helen reveals Sylvia and Ken's affair in front of Bart, Ken, Sylvia and Johnny. Bart reveals he has long known about Sylvia's love for Ken and offers to forgive her, but she cannot go back. The Hunters and Jorgensons each go through an acrimonious public divorce and the teens are sent to boarding schools several states apart. Molly and Johnny are angry at Ken and Sylvia and stop speaking to them.

Ken and Sylvia eventually marry and move into a Frank Lloyd Wright beach house. They talk Molly and Johnny into visiting them there. During their visit, Molly and Johnny have sex (off camera). Soon after, Molly discovers she is pregnant and runs away with Johnny, planning to get married. The local justice of the peace suspects that they are under legal age to marry and turns them down. In desperation, Molly and Johnny turn to Ken and Sylvia, who are supportive. In the end, the happy newlyweds return to Pine Island for their honeymoon.

== Cast ==
- Richard Egan as Ken Jorgenson
- Dorothy McGuire as Sylvia Hunter
- Sandra Dee as Molly Jorgenson
- Arthur Kennedy as Bart Hunter
- Troy Donahue as Johnny Hunter
- Constance Ford as Helen Jorgenson
- Beulah Bondi as Mrs. Emily Hamilton Hamble
- Jack Richardson as Claude Andrews
- Martin Eric as Todd Harper

== Production ==
The film was shot in Pacific Grove, California, and around the Monterey Peninsula. Sloan Wilson wrote the first screenplay, which covered the 22-year span of the novel. Delmer Daves focused the new draft on one year. Daves said:

I have two kids who are just about the same age of these two in A Summer Place and I know how difficult communication between generations can be. And while this may sound corny, it can be assisted by love and understanding. Amid some rather tempestuous social activities, this is what we are trying to demonstrate. That there are two affairs may sound sensational, but that's not the point. We have received the approval of the Johnstone office, because the intent of the picture is a moral one. Frankness and impatience will help pull the cork on a situation blocked by intolerance. What we are trying to do is dramatise that pulling of the cork.

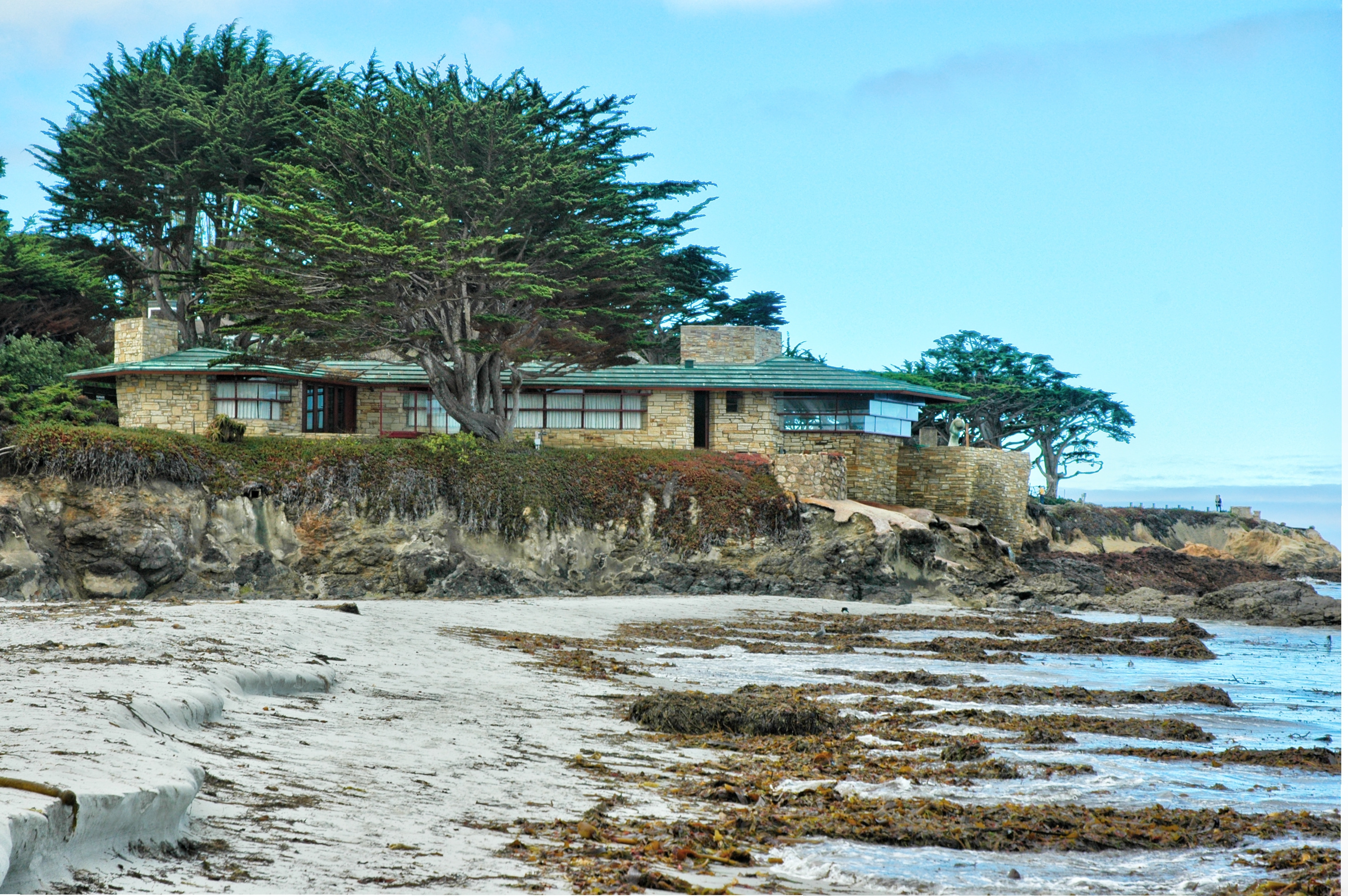
The Frank Lloyd Wright-designed Mrs. Clinton Walker House, portrayed as being on Pine Island, Maine, is in Carmel-by-the-Sea, California

Some exterior and interior scenes involving Ken and Sylvia's beach house were filmed at the Mrs. Clinton Walker House at Carmel-by-the-Sea, designed by Frank Lloyd Wright and built in 1948. In the film, Sylvia tells Molly that Wright designed the house, ostensibly located on the East Coast near the movie's "Pine Island" location (since Molly and Johnny drive from Pine Island to the house after being sent away by the justice of the peace). Though the house is depicted as if it has a lower floor at beach level, in reality the single-story home sits on ledge rock above the tide line. Additional scenes were filmed at the Honeymoon Cottage located at Mission Ranch in Carmel.

Located just outside downtown Pacific Grove, the 1895 LaPorte Mansion served as the filming location for the Pine Island Inn. In 2023, a fire destroyed the historic building.

== Release and reception ==
In spite of a mixed critical reception, the movie was popular with audiences. Harrison's Reports, an industry newsletter for independent movie theater owners, defined it "money in the bank at the box office," "a well-made bit of entertainment," and "sleek and svelte in the best tradition of popular films," but warned exhibitors the film was "devoted almost exclusively to the most popular cinema topic of the day—sex." Howard Thompson of The New York Times called it "one of the most laboriously and garishly sex-scented movies in years" with "Max Steiner's music hammering away at each sexual nuance like a pile driver". On Rotten Tomatoes, A Summer Place holds an approval rating of 83% based on six reviews, with an average rating of 6.00/10.

== Music ==
The 1960 instrumental hit "Theme from A Summer Place", composed by Max Steiner, was used in the film as a secondary musical theme (not the main title theme), originally orchestrated by Murray Cutter for scenes featuring Molly and Johnny. The version used in the film was recorded by Hugo Winterhalter. It was later rearranged and recorded by Percy Faith and performed by his orchestra. In 1960, the Percy Faith version reached number one on the Billboard Hot 100 chart for nine consecutive weeks, a record at that time. The theme has been covered in instrumental or vocal versions by numerous other artists, including The Lettermen, Andy Williams, The Chordettes, Cliff Richard, Julie London, Billy Vaughn, Joanie Sommers, and The Ventures, and has been featured in many other films and television programs. Percy Faith would re-record the piece twice; first in 1969 and later in 1976.

== In popular culture ==
Troy Donahue co-starred in The Crowded Sky, another Warner Bros. film released about ten months after A Summer Place; in a restaurant scene between Donahue's character and co-star Efrem Zimbalist Jr., the popular "Theme from A Summer Place" is heard on the restaurant sound system. In the 1971 film The Omega Man, the lead character Robert Neville (played by Charlton Heston) listens to the film’s main theme in his car on an 8-track tape during the pre-credit opening sequence. The lyrics of the song "Look at Me, I'm Sandra Dee" from the musical Grease refer in part to events from the film.

The film serves as a plot point in Barry Levinson’s 1982 film Diner; set in 1959, the character Boogie and several of his friends attend a screening of A Summer Place, during which Boogie plays a sexual prank on his date as Molly and Johnny kiss onscreen. The 1985 Canadian film My American Cousin, also set in 1959, features the song multiple times. The theme is used in a comedic scene involving two separate seductions in National Lampoon’s 1978 film Animal House.

In television, Jasper Beardsley sang the theme with humorous lyrics while auditioning for the Be Sharps in the 1993 The Simpsons episode Homer's Barbershop Quartet. An "I washed my hair for you" scene appears in Lois & Clark: The New Adventures of Superman, in the first-season episode "Honeymoon in Metropolis", where Lois spends a weekend at the Lexor Hotel and becomes bored with the romantic films shown on television. The theme also appears in The Sopranos in a comedic scene in which Tony Soprano mocks Bobby Baccalieri for confusing Nostradamus with Notre Dame, and in Buffy the Vampire Slayer during its seventh season, when a love charm causes several female characters to fall in love with a boy named R.J.

In film and later television, the song is featured in the 1997 thriller-comedy Con Air during a scene in which a character played by Dave Chappelle is thrown from an airplane, and in the 2001 remake of Ocean's Eleven during the initial scene between Daniel Ocean (George Clooney) and Tess (Julia Roberts). The theme also appeared in the 2024 television series Fallout, in a comedic scene in which the characters Lucy MacLean and Maximus discuss sex.

== See also ==
- List of American films of 1959
