= Murray Cutter =

Hollywood orchestrator

Murray Cutter (15 March 1902, Nice, France – 19 April 1983, Burbank, California) was a Hollywood orchestrator, working mainly for film composer Max Steiner, with over 150 credits spanning the mid-1930s to early 1960s. Nevertheless, he remains relatively unknown except for the much-loved original arrangement of "Over the Rainbow" from the 1939 film The Wizard of Oz. Similar to fellow arranger Alexander Courage, Cutter's name has tended to be overshadowed by the popularity of the composers with whom he was most associated.

Cutter was unusual among orchestrators who tended to specialize, in that he was adept in all genres: musicals (New Moon, Kismet, The Desert Song); romantic drama (Waterloo Bridge, A Summer Place); adventure (Northwest Passage, The Caine Mutiny); family/comedy (National Velvet, Sugarfoot); suspense (The Picture of Dorian Gray, Key Largo); epics (Helen of Troy); and westerns (The Treasure of the Sierra Madre, Johnny Belinda and The Searchers).

An early assignment were the vocal arrangements for the 1937 film version of Rosalie, which ten years before had been orchestrated for Broadway by Steiner. At MGM Cutter worked for Arthur Freed and Mervyn LeRoy on The Wizard of Oz. Under the loose musical direction of Herbert Stothart he contributed the "metallic sound" for the Tin Woodman's "If I Only Had a Heart". Cutter told Oz historian Aljean Harmetz for "Over the Rainbow" he made it sound as pretty as he could with many strings and a touch of woodwind.

After the war he collaborated most closely with Steiner during his golden period with Warner Brothers. Their work on A Summer Place netted them a US #1 hit for the insistent love theme tune. Joining ASCAP in 1946, Cutter occasionally wrote original music for the screen but rarely received a credit.

His last credit, along with Steiner's, was for the 1964 Disney film Those Calloways. No known Broadway credits are recorded for him.
