= Eric S. Hatch =

American novelist

Eric S. Hatch (October 31, 1901 - July 4, 1973) was an American writer on the staff of The New Yorker and a novelist and screenwriter best known for his novels 1101 Park Avenue, (which became the hit 1936 film, My Man Godfrey) and The Year of the Horse (adapted as the 1968 Disney comedy, The Horse in the Gray Flannel Suit).

== Biography ==
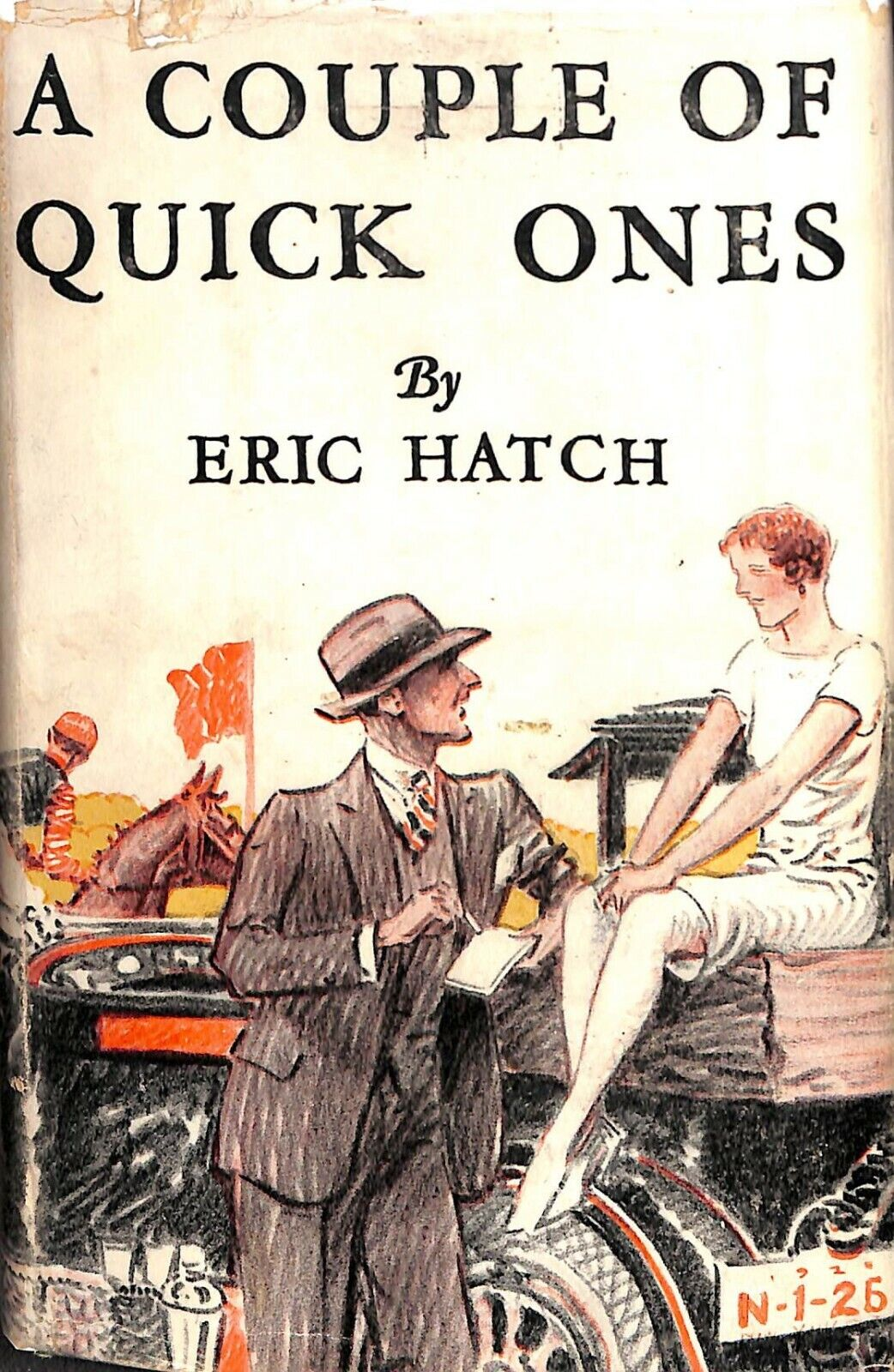
Cover of Hatch's 1928 novel, art by Paul Desmond Brown

Born in New York City, Eric was the son of May D. Hatch and her husband Frederic H. Hatch, owner of a successful Wall Street stock brokerage firm he founded in 1888. Eric was the younger brother of biographer Alden Hatch.

Boucher and McComas praised his 1950 fantasy The Beautiful Bequest, saying it had "the zestful appeal of a good novel from the lamented Unknown."

Eric Hatch died in Torrington, Connecticut at age seventy-one.

== Bibliography ==
- A Couple of Quick Ones, 1928
- Romance Prescribed, 1930
- Lover's Loot, 1931
- Five Days, 1933
- Road Show, 1934
- Fly By Night, 1935
- 1101 Park Avenue, also known as My Man Godfrey, 1935
- Good Old Jack, 1937
- Unexpected Uncle, 1941
- Words and Music, 1943
- The Unexpected Warrior, 1947
- The Beautiful Bequest, 1950
- Crockett's Woman, 1951
- The Golden Woman, 1952
- A Guide to Historic Sites in Connecticut, 1963
- The Judge and the Junior Exhibitor, 1964
- The Little Book of Bells, 1964
- The Year of the Horse, 1965
- The Colonel's Ladies, 1968
- Two and Two is Six, 1969
- What Goes on in Horses' Heads, 1970

== Screenplays ==
- 1931: Sidewalks of New York
- 1936: My Man Godfrey
- 1937: Topper
- 1951: Kelly episode of Kraft Television Theatre
- 1957: My Man Godfrey
- 1968: The Horse in the Grey Flannel Suit
