= A Summer Place (novel) =

1958 novel by Sloan Wilson

- First edition
- Author: Sloan Wilson
- Language: English
- Publisher: Simon & Schuster
- Publication date: 1958
- Publication place: United States
- Media type: Print (Hardback)
- Pages: 369 pp.(first edition)
- Preceded by: The Man in the Gray Flannel Suit

A Summer Place is a 1958 novel by Sloan Wilson, and follows his 1955 bestseller The Man in the Gray Flannel Suit. The novel is about an adult couple who rekindle a long-ago summer romance that ended because of class differences, and their two teenage children from other marriages who also fall in love with each other. It was adapted into the 1959 film A Summer Place.

== Plot summary ==
Two onetime teenage lovers, Ken Jorgenson and Sylvia Hunter, marry other people, but rediscover each other later in life. By then, Sylvia has a son, Johnny, and Ken a daughter, Molly, who also begin a romance.

While in college, the self-supporting Ken takes a summer job as a lifeguard on Pine Island, an exclusive Maine island resort, where Sylvia and her nouveau riche family are staying as guests of the old money owners. The rich young people at the resort mock Ken and exclude him from their social activities, considering him a lowly employee. Although Sylvia is strongly attracted to Ken, she feels pressure from her family and from her wealthy peers to reject the impoverished Ken and make a more suitable match with Bart Hunter, the son of a wealthy, established island family. Bart and Ken eventually come to blows over Sylvia, leading to Ken and Sylvia secretly consummating their love. Ken leaves the island for good at the end of the summer, and Sylvia marries Bart as her family wishes.

Ken becomes a millionaire through his work as a research chemist, and marries his partner's daughter, Helen, who turns out to be prudish and frigid. Meanwhile, Sylvia's husband Bart turns to alcohol as his family fortune dwindles, and he turns their island home into an inn. After twenty years away, Ken decides to visit the island again, writing Bart to ask for lodging. At first Bart wants to refuse, since he feels Ken is visiting to gloat over the relative change in their financial circumstances, but Sylvia insists that they need the money too badly to turn Ken down.

Ken brings Molly and Helen to the island, and everyone tries to be cordial. The young Johnny and Molly soon become enamored of each other, while Ken and Sylvia fall in love all over again. When Bart finds out about Ken and Sylvia, he asks for a divorce and custody of their son John. Later, a friend of Helen's alerts her to Ken's affair with Sylvia, and Ken and Helen divorce. John and Molly are sent to separate boarding schools. Ken and Sylvia eventually marry.

While at their respective schools, John and Molly begin an avid correspondence. Helen and her mother Margaret are not pleased, as they find it inappropriate for a girl Molly's age to be so attached to a boy, but the correspondence continues, with rendezvous during school breaks. John and Molly's romance culminates when they see each other again at Ken and Sylvia's beach house. The teenagers acknowledge that they are in love with one another, and they consummate it shortly thereafter.

Back at school, Molly learns from a doctor that she is pregnant, and John hitchhikes across the country to be with and support her. Ken and Sylvia give their guarded approval to John and Molly's marriage, feeling it would be hypocritical for them to deny the teenagers their love. Bart cannot attend the wedding, since his alcoholism has forced him to enter a veterans' hospital; while he disapproves, he urges John to take over the inn. Helen attends the wedding under sedation. John and Molly spend their honeymoon on Pine Island, John's "one good inheritance", as Bart terms it in a letter.

== Publishing arrangements ==
According to Time magazine, the financial terms accompanying the publication of A Summer Place were unusual:

- royalties were "above the 15% top writers receive", with income spread out for tax purposes at $25,000 a year or more;
- the pre-publication order was for nearly 50,000 copies at a $4.50 list price;
- an intermediary called Ridge Press negotiated with Simon & Schuster and other parties for rights to the novel;
- Ridge Press kept full film and television rights, denying the publisher its typical 10% cut;
- McCall's paid Ridge Press $100,000 ($1.1 million today) for serialization rights;
- The film rights were sold for $500,000 ($5.6 million today) plus 25% of the profits.
