= My Man Godfrey (1957 film) =

1957 film by Henry Koster

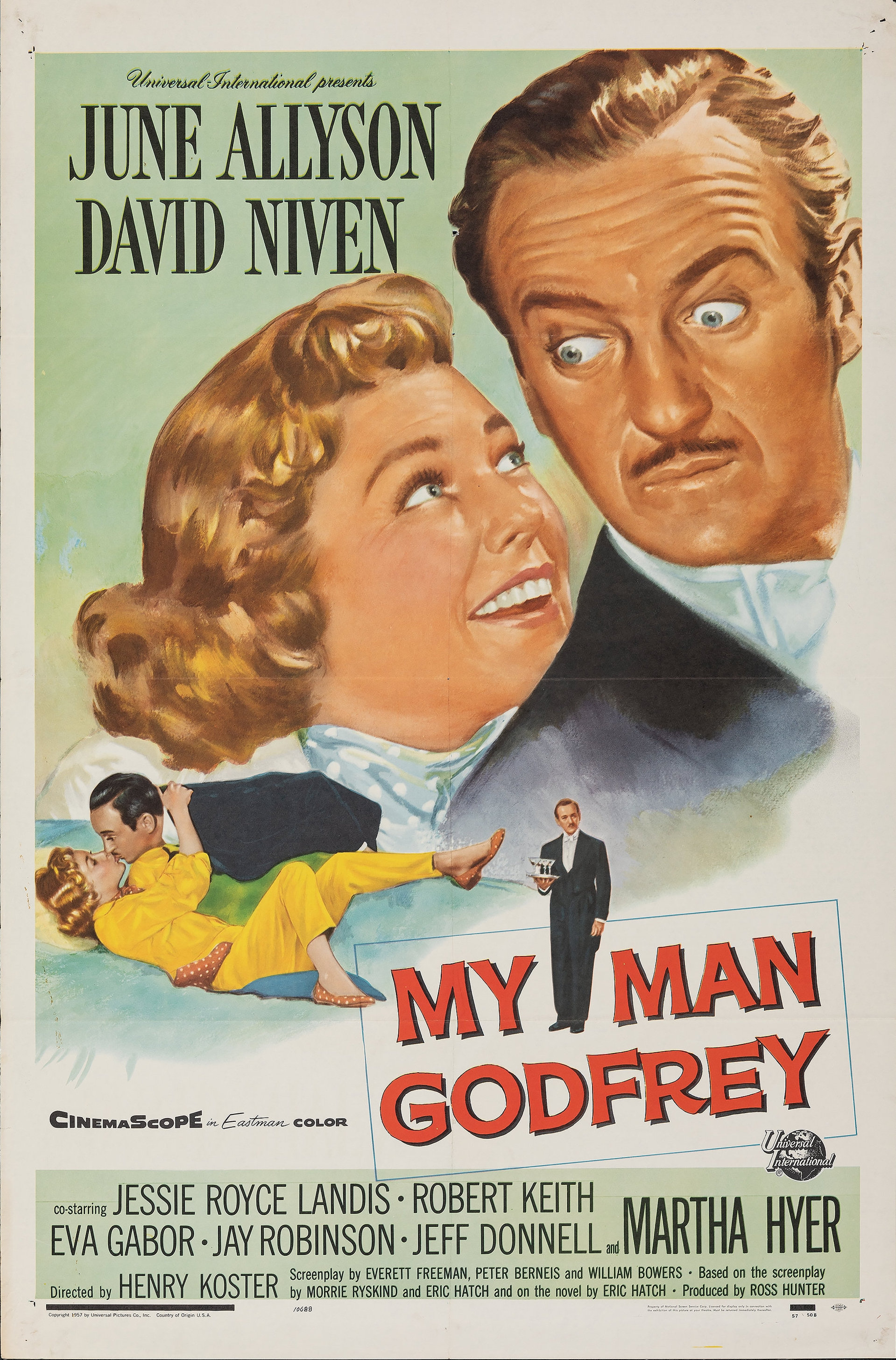
- Theatrical release poster
- Directed by: Henry Koster
- Written by: Peter Berneis; William Bowers; Everett Freeman
- Based on: My Man Godfrey; 1935 novel by Eric Hatch; My Man Godfrey; 1936 film
- Produced by: Ross Hunter
- Starring: June Allyson; David Niven
- Cinematography: William H. Daniels
- Edited by: Milton Carruth
- Music by: Frank Skinner
- Color process: Eastmancolor
- Production company: Universal Pictures
- Distributed by: Universal Pictures
- Release dates: October 11, 1957 (New York City); October 18, 1957 (United States)
- Running time: 92 minutes
- Country: United States
- Language: English
- Box office: $1.2 million

My Man Godfrey is a 1957 American CinemaScope comedy film starring June Allyson and David Niven. It was adapted by Peter Berneis, William Bowers, and Everett Freeman, and directed by Henry Koster. The film is a color remake of Gregory La Cava's 1936 screwball comedy of the same name. Allyson played the role created by Carole Lombard in the original version, and Niven took on the role made famous by William Powell. Niven had played the role of Tommy Gray, Godfrey's former classmate, in a 1938 radio version. While the original film from 1936 did not have its copyright renewed and is in the public domain, this film's copyright was renewed. (Note: Under RE0000242777) Both films are derivative works of the still-copyrighted 1935 novel by Eric S. Hatch, 1101 Park Avenue.

== Plot ==
The plot begins as a zany heiress uses and then takes pity on a man whom she believes to be homeless. She insists the man come home with her and gives him a job as the eccentric family's butler—much to the chagrin of her father, especially when it becomes clear the lady is falling head-over-heels in love with the fellow. The family's new butler, however, harbors a secret; he is actually as wealthy as and in fact more well-born than they are.

== Cast ==
- June Allyson as Irene [Bullock]
- David Niven as Godfrey
- Jessie Royce Landis as Angelica [Bullock]
- Robert Keith as Mr. [Alexander] Bullock
- Eva Gabor as Francesca [Gray]
- Jay Robinson as Vincent
- Martha Hyer as Cordelia [Bullock]
- Jeff Donnell as Molly
- Herbert Anderson as Hubert
- Eric Sinclair as Brent
- Dabbs Greer as Lieutenant O'Connor
- Fred Essler as Captain
- Fred Coby as Investigator

== Production ==
The film was meant to mark the Hollywood debut of O. W. Fischer, but he was fired two weeks into production and was sued by Universal. The film was released on September 6, 2016, as part of the Universal Vault Series on MOD DVD.
