= John Martin (pioneer) =

American pioneer

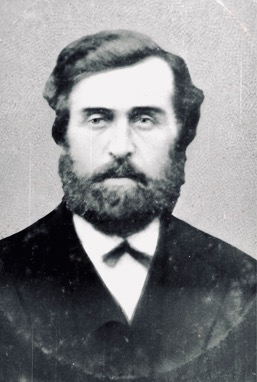
- John Martin
- Born: December 11, 1827; Strathaven, Scotland
- Died: 28 February 1893 (aged 65); Carmel-by-the-Sea, California, US
- Occupations: Farmer, dairyman
- Spouse: Elizabeth Hislop
- Children: 6

John Martin (December 11, 1827 – February 28, 1893) was a Scottish-American pioneer who arrived to Monterey County, California in 1856. He purchased 216 unsettled acres (87 ha) near the mouth of Carmel Valley, close to today's Carmel Mission, predating the development of Carmel-by-the-Sea. Martin built a farmhouse on the property in the early 1870s for his wife and children near Carmel Point, known today as Mission Ranch, owned by Clint Eastwood since 1986.

== Early life ==
John Martin was born on December 11, 1827, in Strathaven, Lanarkshire, Scotland. His parents were pioneers William Martin (1799-1885) and Agnes Martin (1797-1878). William and Agnes Martin emigrated from Scotland with their five sons. They first came to Ontario, Canada in the 1840s. During the California Gold Rush, they sailed by steam boat from Canada to Panama, traveling through the Isthmus of Panama by boat up the coast. When they landed in Monterey by ship in 1856, they acquired a ranch at Neponset, California, an area north of Monterey, where the family became farmers.

== Professional life ==
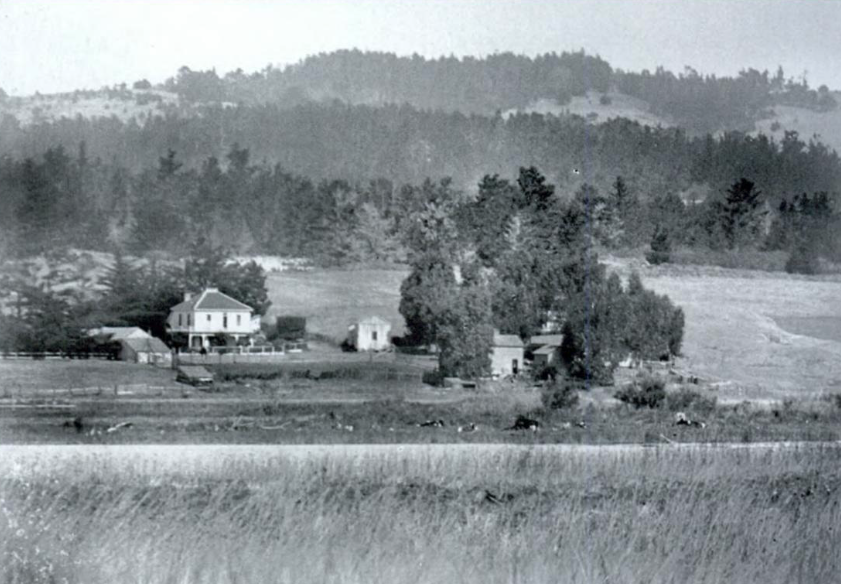
Martin Ranch in 1900

John Martin bought 216-acre (0.87 km^{2}) from land broker Lafayette F. and Annie Loveland in 1859. The land was bounded by 12th and Santa Lucia avenues, which today is known as Carmel Point, Hatton Fields, and the Carmel River. The property became known as Mission Ranch because it was so close to the Carmel Mission.

The Martin Ranch was a cattle ranch and dryland farming operation. They farmed potatoes, barley, and had a milk dairy. The property became one of the first California dairies that supplied the county with cheese and butter. The barns were used for hay and milking.

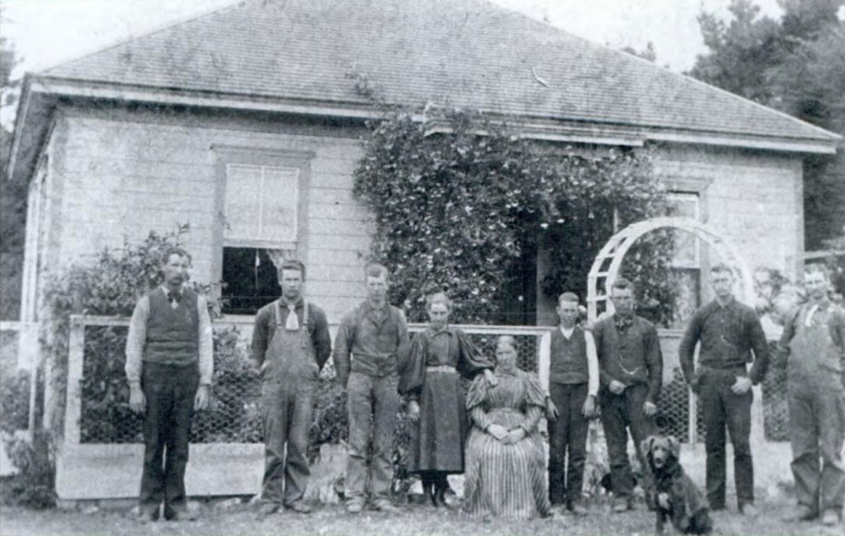
The original house on the John Martin Ranch, with Stewart/Martin family members, (standing l-r) Joseph, Will, Carmel, Isabel, Elizabeth is seated, Roy, Robert, James, and Andrew. (1870s)

Martin married Elizabeth Hislop Stewart (1840-1916) on February 10, 1871, in Middlesex, Ontario, Canada, while he was visiting Canada. She was a widow with three sons. Martin and Elizabeth had six children together in 12 years.

John Martin built a one story hipped-roof farmhouse in the early 1870s for his wife and children. The ranch included barns, bunkhouse, and several outhouses. A second story was added by 1896. The farmhouse is still present today and is part of the Mission Ranch resort. The Martin homestead is now called Mission Ranch. It was bought in 1986 by Clint Eastwood, who restored the farmhouse, cottage, and barn in the style of the original buildings.

== Death ==
Martin died by suicide on Tuesday, February 28, 1893, in what is today known as Carmel-by-the-Sea, California, at the age of 65. He had been sick for several weeks, and hanged himself from a tree on his ranch according to the coroner.

His wife, Elizabeth stayed on the ranch for the rest of her life. She died on November 25, 1916, in Carmel, having lived a long life of 76 years. Her funeral took place at the family ranch. Her remains were buried at the Martin Plot, at the Monterey City Cemetery.

== See also ==
- Timeline of Carmel-by-the-Sea, California
