= Sidewalks of New York (1931 film) =

1931 film

- Theatrical release poster
- Directed by: Zion Myers; Jules White
- Written by: Dialogue by Robert E. Hopkins, Eric Hatch, and Willard Mack; Story by George Landy and Paul Gerard Smith
- Produced by: Lawrence Weingarten
- Starring: Buster Keaton; Anita Page; Cliff Edwards; Frank Rowan; Norman Phillips, Jr.
- Cinematography: Leonard Smith
- Edited by: Charles Hochberg
- Music by: Domenico Savino
- Production company: Metro-Goldwyn-Mayer
- Distributed by: Metro-Goldwyn-Mayer
- Release date: September 26, 1931
- Running time: 74 minutes
- Country: United States
- Language: English

Sidewalks of New York is a 1931 American comedy film directed by Zion Myers and Jules White and starring Buster Keaton. The film was commercially successful.

== Plot ==
Harmon is a wealthy landlord. When he goes to visit one of his tenements, he gets caught in the middle of a brawl between groups of kids, one of whom, Clipper Kelly starts to attack Harmon. When Harmon defends himself, he is seen by Clipper's sister, Margie. Harmon falls in love at first sight and begins to woo her following his trial for attacking Clipper. In order to demonstrate that he is okay, Harmon opens a gymnasium for the street boys, but Clipper, who has fallen in with a small-time gangster, Butch, wants nothing to do with Harmon and turns the other boys against him.

Harmon tries to win them over by staging a wrestling match with his friend Poggle and a rigged boxing match with Mulvaney. In the meantime, Butch has gotten Clipper involved in a series of robberies with Clipper dressed as a woman. When Butch and Clipper believe Harmon has learned of their illegal activities, Butch orders Clipper to kill Harmon during a stage play that is being performed at the gymnasium, but Clipper gets cold feet. Butch grabs Harmon, who is dressed in Clipper's drag costume, thinking he is Clipper, and heads up to Harmon's mansion to rob it. Butch's gang joins them and Clipper and the other boys come to Harmon's rescue.

== Cast ==
- Buster Keaton as Harmon
- Anita Page as Margie
- Cliff Edwards as Poggle
- Frank Rowan as Butch
- Norman Phillips Jr. as Clipper
- Syd Saylor as Mulvaney
- Clark Marshall as Lefty
- Jerry Tucker as Little Boy (uncredited)

== Reception ==
Keaton's most commercially successful film, Sidewalks of New York grossed $885,000 with a net profit of nearly $200,000.

== See also ==
- List of boxing films
