= The Man in the Gray Flannel Suit =

1956 film by Nunnally Johnson

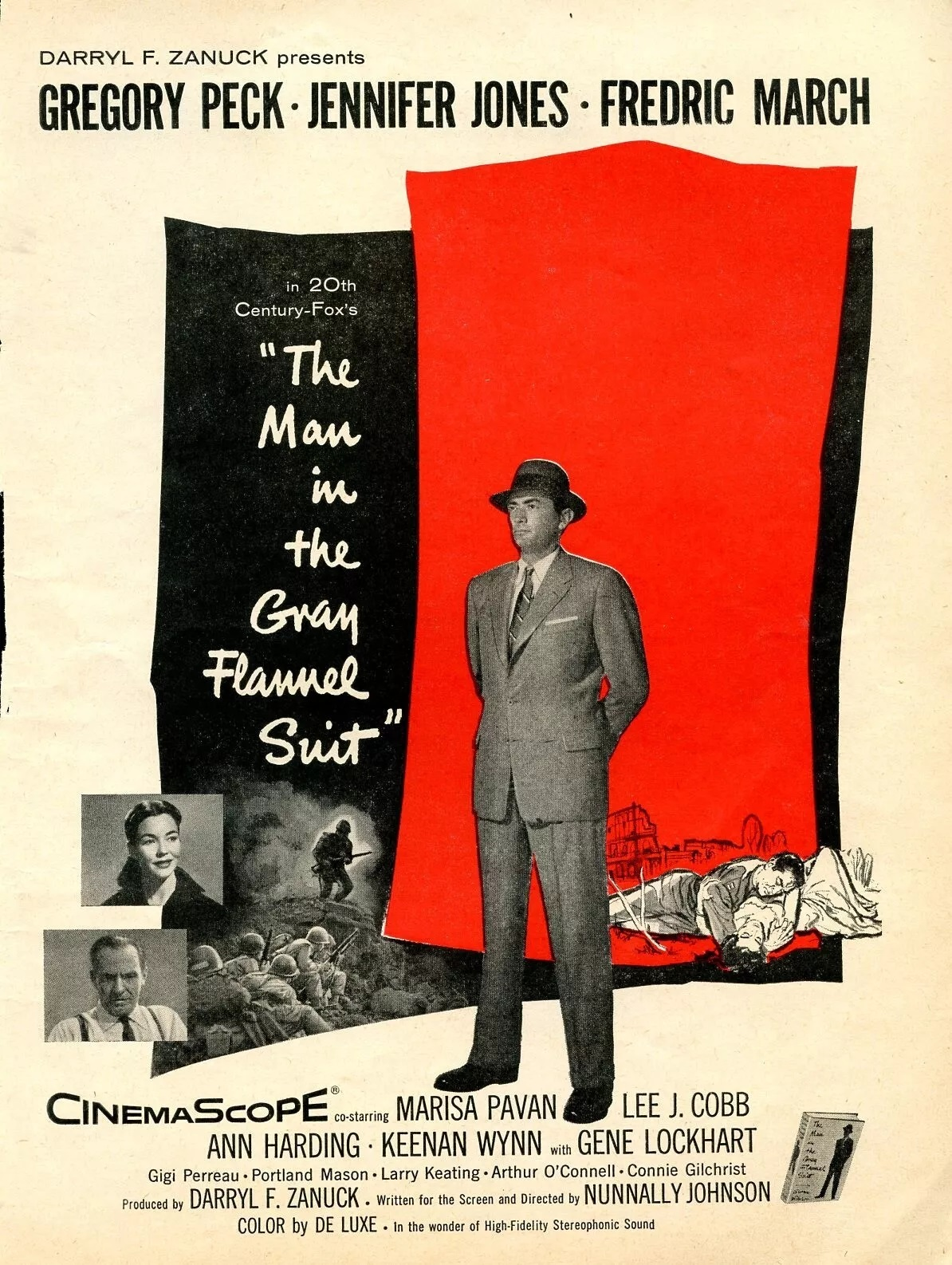
- Theatrical release poster
- Directed by: Nunnally Johnson
- Screenplay by: Nunnally Johnson
- Based on: The Man in the Gray Flannel Suit by: 1955 novel; Sloan Wilson
- Produced by: Darryl F. Zanuck
- Starring: Gregory Peck; Jennifer Jones; Fredric March
- Cinematography: Charles G. Clarke
- Edited by: Dorothy Spencer
- Music by: Bernard Herrmann
- Production company: 20th Century-Fox
- Distributed by: 20th Century-Fox
- Release date: April 12, 1956
- Running time: 153 minutes
- Country: United States
- Language: English
- Budget: $2.6 million
- Box office: $4.4 million (US rentals)

The Man in the Gray Flannel Suit is a 1956 American drama film starring Gregory Peck, Jennifer Jones, and Fredric March, with Lee J. Cobb, Keenan Wynn and Marisa Pavan in support. Based on the 1955 novel by Sloan Wilson, it was written and directed by Nunnally Johnson, and focuses on Tom Rath, a young World War II veteran trying to balance the pressures of his marriage to an ambitious wife and growing family with the demands of a career while dealing with the after-effects of his war service and a new high-stress job. The film was entered at the 1956 Cannes Film Festival.

== Plot ==
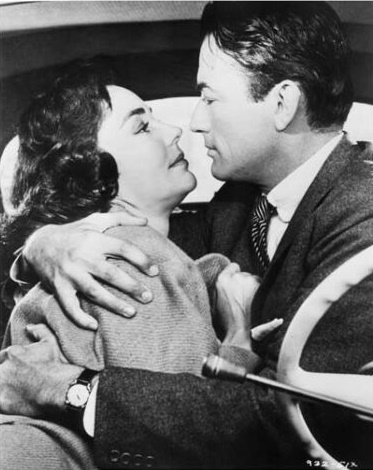
Jennifer Jones and Gregory Peck in The Man in the Gray Flannel Suit

Ten years after the end of World War II Tom Rath is living in suburban Connecticut with his wife Betsy and three children. He is having difficulty supporting his family and his wife's ambitions on his writer's salary at a Manhattan nonprofit foundation. Tom is also dealing with post-traumatic stress syndrome in the form of frequent and disquieting flashbacks of his combat service as an Army captain in the European and Pacific theaters. These include actions where he killed men in combat (including, by accident, his best friend) and had a romantic relationship with a young Italian woman named Maria when stationed in Italy, resulting in her pregnancy, while involved with Betsy.

When an inheritance from Tom's recently deceased grandmother turns out to have been depleted, leaving only her large and unsaleable estate, Betsy appeals to Tom to seek a higher-paying job. Acting on a tip from a fellow train commuter, he applies for an opening in public relations at television network United Broadcasting Company (UBC). Asked to write his autobiography as part of the interview process, he defers in favor of a simple declaration that he wants the job, expects he can grow into it and will be happy to answer any questions directly related to his application. His forthrightness catches the attention of founding network president Ralph Hopkins, who seeks his help in launching a national mental health campaign. Hopkins is powerful and highly respected but a workaholic whose success has been at the expense of his family life, leaving him estranged from his wife and rebellious daughter. He is drawn to Tom's frankness and physical traits that remind him of the son he lost in World War II.

Tom is initially supervised by Bill Ogden, an officious micromanager and office politician who rejects Tom's drafts of an important speech with which Hopkins intends to launch the campaign, substituting his platitude-filled draft of what Ogden thinks Hopkins wants to hear. Aware the impetus for that pitch came from Hopkins and dangerously pressured by Ogden, Tom plans to play along and accept that draft but coaxed by Betsy, presents his original ideas to Hopkins instead. Hopkins is stunned and intrigued by Tom's incisive approach and naked candor but their meeting at Hopkins' city suite is interrupted by the unwelcome news that his daughter has eloped with an older man. Deeply disturbed, Hopkins becomes reflective and relates to Tom that his son "did the right thing" and refused a commission in World War II and was killed in action as an enlisted man. Hopkins now regrets having ignored his family and advises Tom not to make the same mistake.

When a man makes an offer to buy the couple's modest suburban home, the family moves into Tom's late grandmother's larger house, which they dub "Dragonwyck." Complications immediately ensue when Edward, the grandmother's longtime caretaker, claims that Tom's grandmother had bequeathed him the estate. Judge Bernstein intercedes and presents evidence suggesting not only did Edward forge the bequest letter but also padded his bills, depleting the estate and accumulating a fortune that could not otherwise be explained. The Raths are able to keep the house.

At his new job, Tom runs into elevator operator Caesar, his sergeant in Italy. Caesar is married to the cousin of his Italian lover Maria and tells Tom that Maria and her son by Tom are desperate for money in their war-ravaged country. Tom has kept his relationship and child a secret from Betsy, but in a conversation that evening about the need to be truthful in marriage, Tom now tells Betsy about Maria and the child. Betsy, heartbroken and anguished by the betrayal, speeds away in the family car.

The following morning, South Bay police tell Tom that they have Betsy, who they found wandering down the Merrick Parkway, having ran out of gas during her flight. As he is about to get to the police station, Hopkins calls to ask Tom to accompany him on a trip to California in support of the new campaign. Tom declines, saying he just wants to "work 9 to 5 and spend the rest of the time with my family," a decision Hopkins respectfully but ruefully accepts. Tom retrieves Betsy and they reconcile. The couple go to Judge Bernstein to set up a third-person conduit for sending funds to Tom's son in Italy. They leave together, embrace and kiss.

== Cast ==
- Gregory Peck as Tom Rath
- Jennifer Jones as Betsy Rath
- Fredric March as Ralph Hopkins
- Marisa Pavan as Maria Montagne
- Lee J. Cobb as Judge Bernstein
- Ann Harding as Helen Hopkins
- Keenan Wynn as Sgt. Caesar Gardella
- Gene Lockhart as Bill Hawthorne
- Gigi Perreau as Susan Hopkins
- Portland Mason as Janey Rath
- Arthur O'Connell as Gordon Walker
- Henry Daniell as Bill Ogden
- Connie Gilchrist as Mrs. Manter
- Joseph Sweeney as Edward M. Schultz
- Sandy Descher as Barbara Rath
- DeForest Kelley as medic

== Reception ==
=== Box office ===
The film, like the novel on which it was based, became hugely popular with the public. Produced on a budget of $2,670,000 it grossed $4,350,000 in US rentals in 1956.

=== Theatrical reviews ===
Contemporary reviews of the film were somewhat mixed. Bosley Crowther of The New York Times declared it "a mature, fascinating and often quite tender and touching film." Variety wrote that the film "often seems episodic and it's over-long," finding Johnson's direction "uneven" and holding him "responsible for the fact that the picture so determinedly misses the point of the book which made the flannel suit a symbol rather than just a garment." Harrison's Reports called it "one of the most absorbing pictures of the year," with "exceptionally fine" acting. John McCarten of The New Yorker thought the film was too long and suggested that the flashbacks should have been trimmed, concluding that "if it were an old-fashioned serial, I'm sure we might have been able to tolerate it. In one massive dose, though, it's just too damned much, and I think you'd be better off taking a tranquilizer pill than going through all this for the sake of escaping the world and its woes." The Monthly Film Bulletin wrote: "As a sociological document, a particular view of the contemporary American middle-class scene, the film is uneasily fascinating. Otherwise, this is a characteristic best-seller adaptation, over-long, over-loaded with 'production values', padded out with flashbacks to the war years, and efficiently impersonal in its approach."

=== Social critique ===
Historian Robert Schultz argues that the film and the novel are cultural representations of what Adlai Stevenson had described in 1955 as a "crisis in the western world", "collectivism colliding with individualism," the collective demands of corporate organizations against traditional roles of spouse and parent. That increased corporate organization of society, Schultz notes, reduced white-collar workers' (represented by Tom Rath and the other gray-suited "yes men") control over what they did and how they did it as they adapted to the "organized system" described and critiqued by contemporary social critics such as Paul Goodman, C. Wright Mills, and William H. Whyte.

== See also ==
- List of American films of 1956
- The Horse in the Gray Flannel Suit
