= Mrs. Clinton Walker House =

House in Carmel Point, California

- U.S. National Register of Historic Places
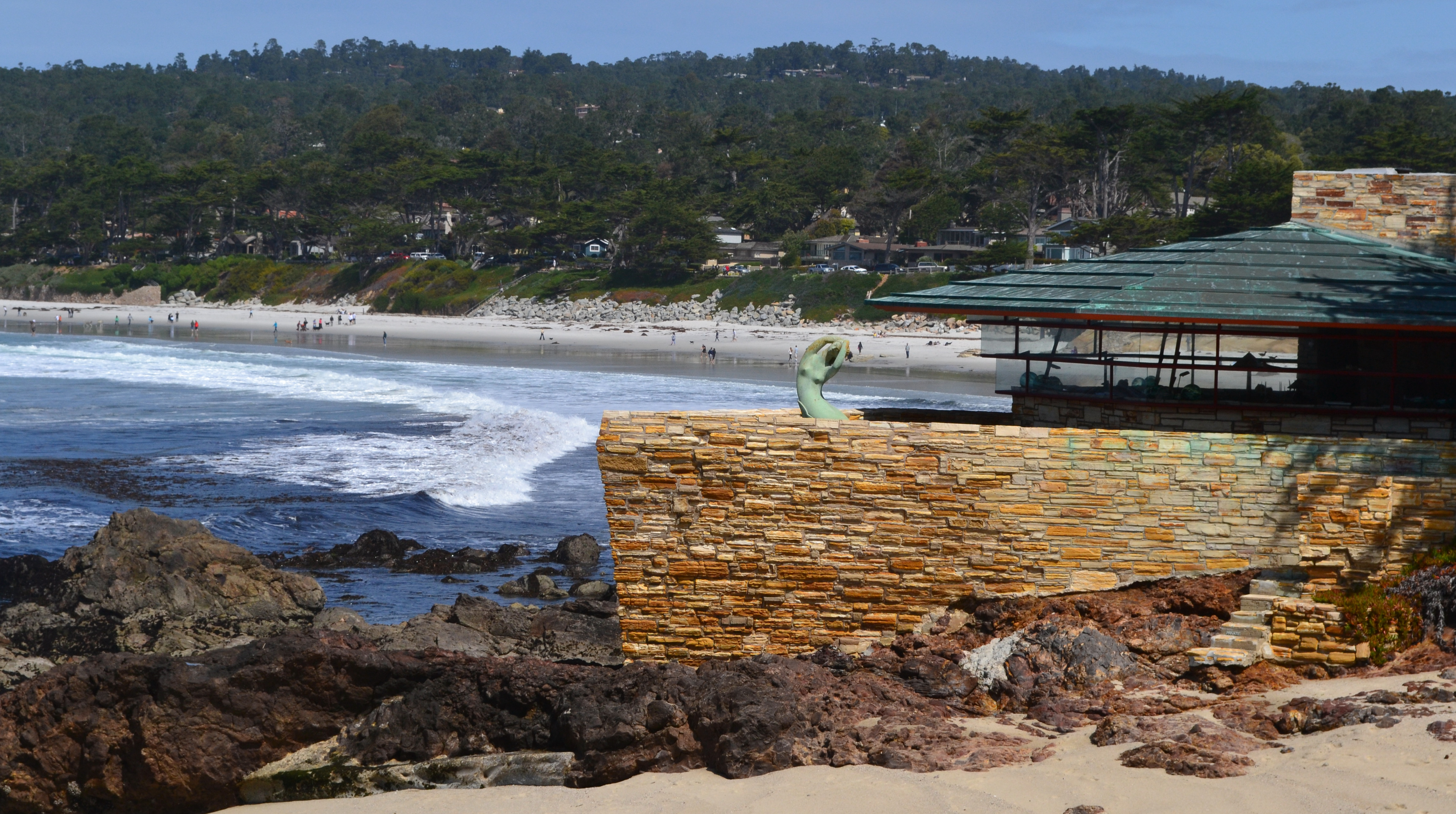

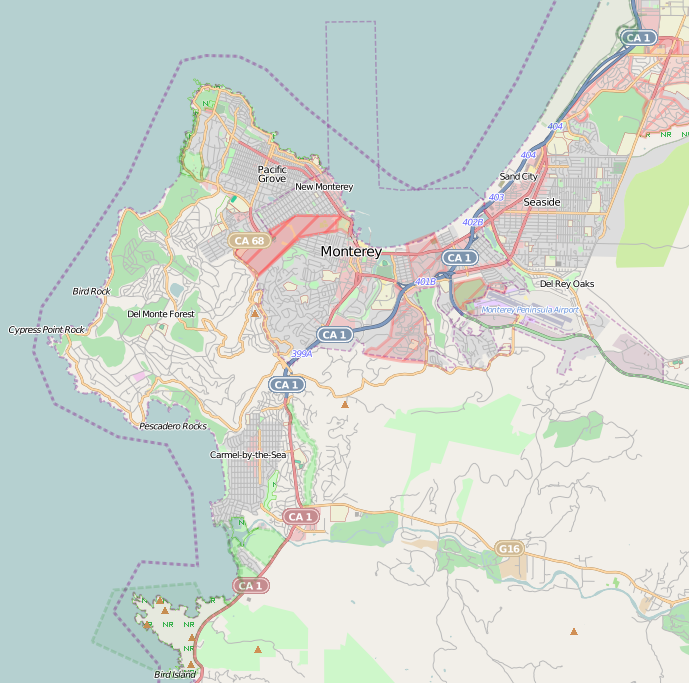
- Location within Monterey Peninsula Location within California
- Location: 26336 Scenic Road, Carmel-by-the-Sea, California
- Coordinates: 36.54484°N 121.93142°W
- Area: 1.2 acres (0.49 ha)
- Built: 1951
- Built by: Miles Bain
- Architect: Frank Lloyd Wright
- Architectural style: Organic architecture
- NRHP reference No.: 16000634
- Added to NRHP: November 17, 1977

Mrs. Clinton Walker House, also known as Cabin on the Rocks, is a beach house located on Carmel Point, near Carmel-by-the-Sea, California. Designed by Frank Lloyd Wright in 1948, it was completed in 1952 for Mrs. Clinton "Della" Walker of Pebble Beach. The home appeared in the 1959 movie A Summer Place and is listed on the National Register of Historic Places.

== History ==
In 1918, Willis J. Walker and his wife purchased 216 acres (87 ha) of land in Carmel-by-the-Sea, a city in Monterey County, California, located on the state's Central Coast. In the 1940s Mrs. Walker's sister deeded an oceanfront lot to Della Walker, with the condition that she find a noted architect to design a house. Della reached out to Frank Lloyd Wright and told him she wanted a house "as durable as the rocks and as transparent as the waves."

The home received a National Register of Historic Places designation on November 17, 1977.

== Description ==
The house is built on a mass of granite boulders, uses the local Carmel-stone, and has a blue-green roof intended to evoke the color of the sea and the shape of a ship. An example of Wright's organic architecture, it is his only residential work that overlooks the ocean.

The 1,200-square-foot (110 m^{2}) single-story home incorporates Usonian design elements. Its concrete floor is divided into hexagonal honeycomb-like 120-degree angles, with three rooms completely open with views of the ocean. Though Wright always intended the house to be roofed in copper (that would turn blue-green through natural process of verdigris), its low roof was originally covered with triangular blue porcelain panels due to copper restrictions during the Korean War of the early 1950s; these were later replaced with copper shingles. The living-dining room is centered around a floor-to-ceiling fireplace with built-in furniture. The window frames are painted in Wright's signature "Cherokee Red", with reverse-stepped glass.

In 1954, Wright said, "The over-all-effect is quiet, and the long white surf lines of the sea seem to join the lines of the house to make a natural melody." The grounds were designed by the landscape architect Thomas Church. In 1956, Walker, an artist, asked Wright to design a studio addition to the master bedroom suite. Unbuilt at that time, it was subsequently rendered by her nephew, an architect, in 1960.

== A Summer Place ==
In the 1959 movie A Summer Place, the characters Ken Jorgenson (Richard Egan) and Sylvia (Dorothy McGuire) own a beach house, which was filmed at the Clinton Walker House. In the film, Sylvia tells Molly (Sandra Dee) that Frank Lloyd Wright designed the home, seemingly located on the East Coast near the movie's "Pine Island, Maine", location. The film shows views of the Walker house's interior, exterior and patio. Additional scenes were filmed at a cottage located at Mission Ranch Hotel and Restaurant in Carmel.

== Renovations ==
Della, an artist, had requested a design for a studio addition to the master bedroom suite from Wright in 1956, which went unbuilt. She subsequently retained her nephew, Sandy, an architect, to complete the design and render it as an addition to the home in 1960. It was completed by some of the original carpenters that had built the house.

In 1964, San Francisco sculptor Robert Howard installed a crushed stone and copper ore mermaid sculpture on the deck, called Undine. The 5 ft 7 in (1.70 m) two-ton sculpture sits on a base that can be rotated for viewing.

In 2010, the front living room window mullions were replaced, the front gate repaired, and the National Historic Register Plaque was installed at the front door. Other projects included replacing the rear yard windscreen, updating the garden, and repairing the radiant heat floor.

In 2018, the wall or ship's prow of the building facing the water was replaced because the Carmel stone mortar had worn away and water had gotten inside the masonry. The home sold for $22 million in 2023.

== Gallery ==
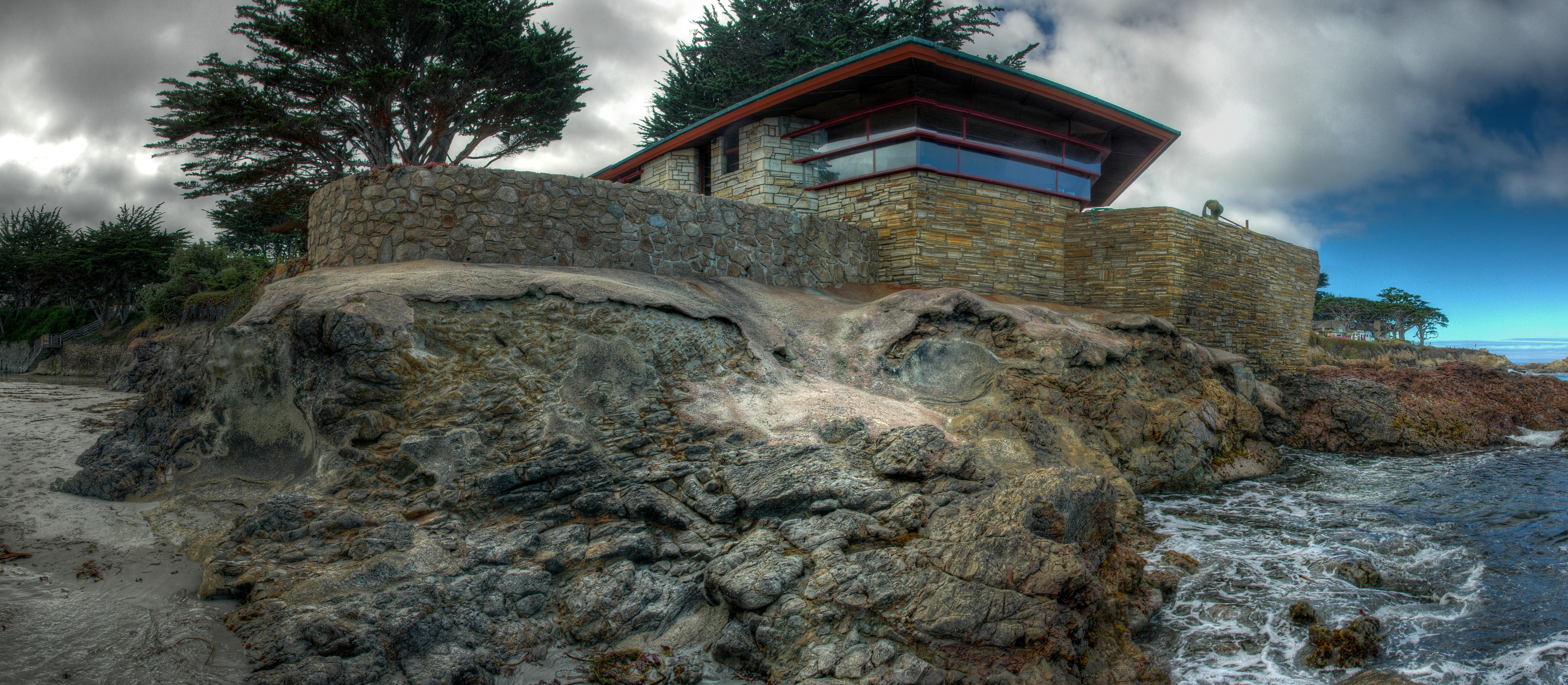
Ocean view of Mrs. Clinton Walker House

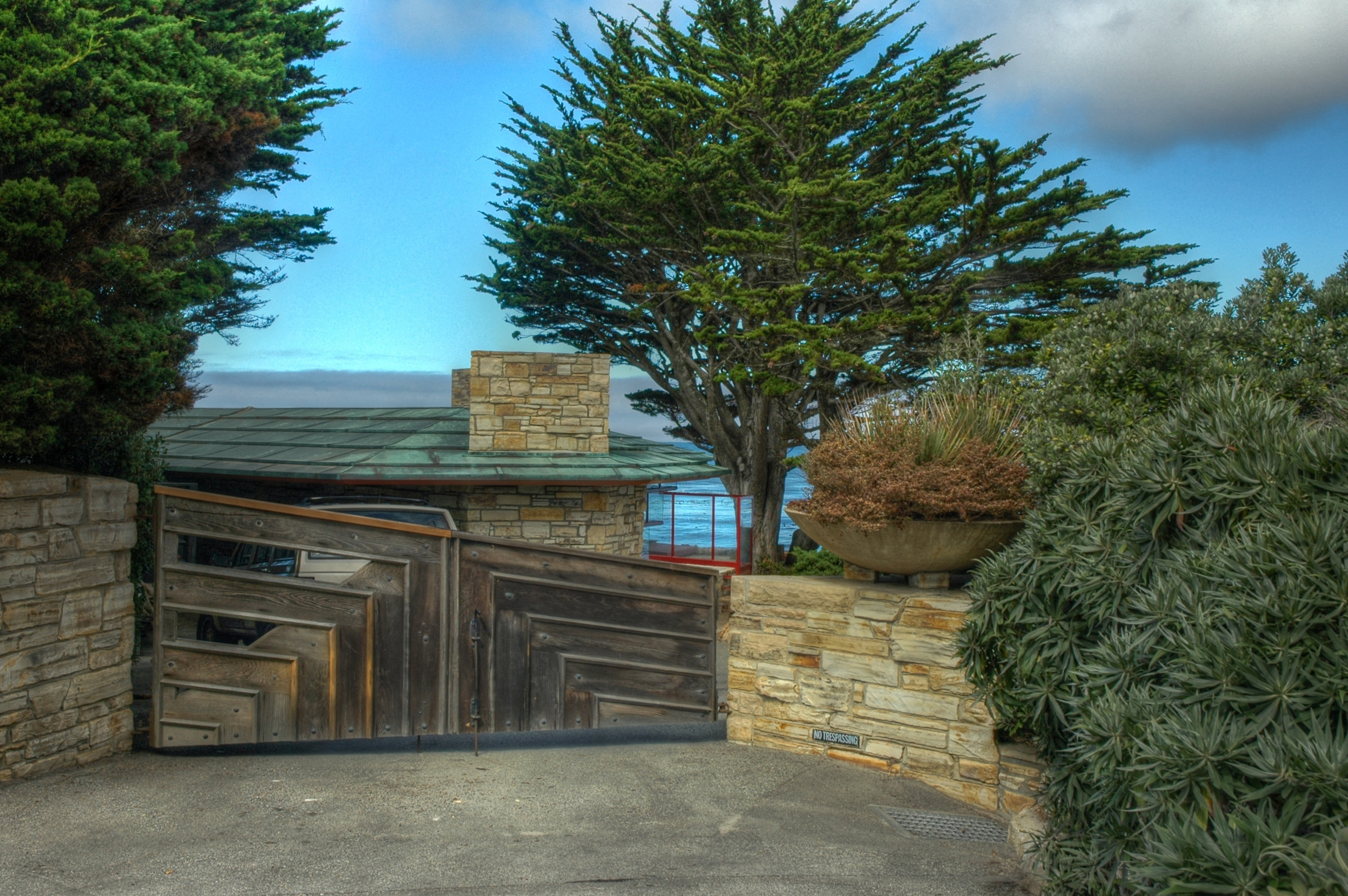
Street view of Mrs. Clinton Walker House

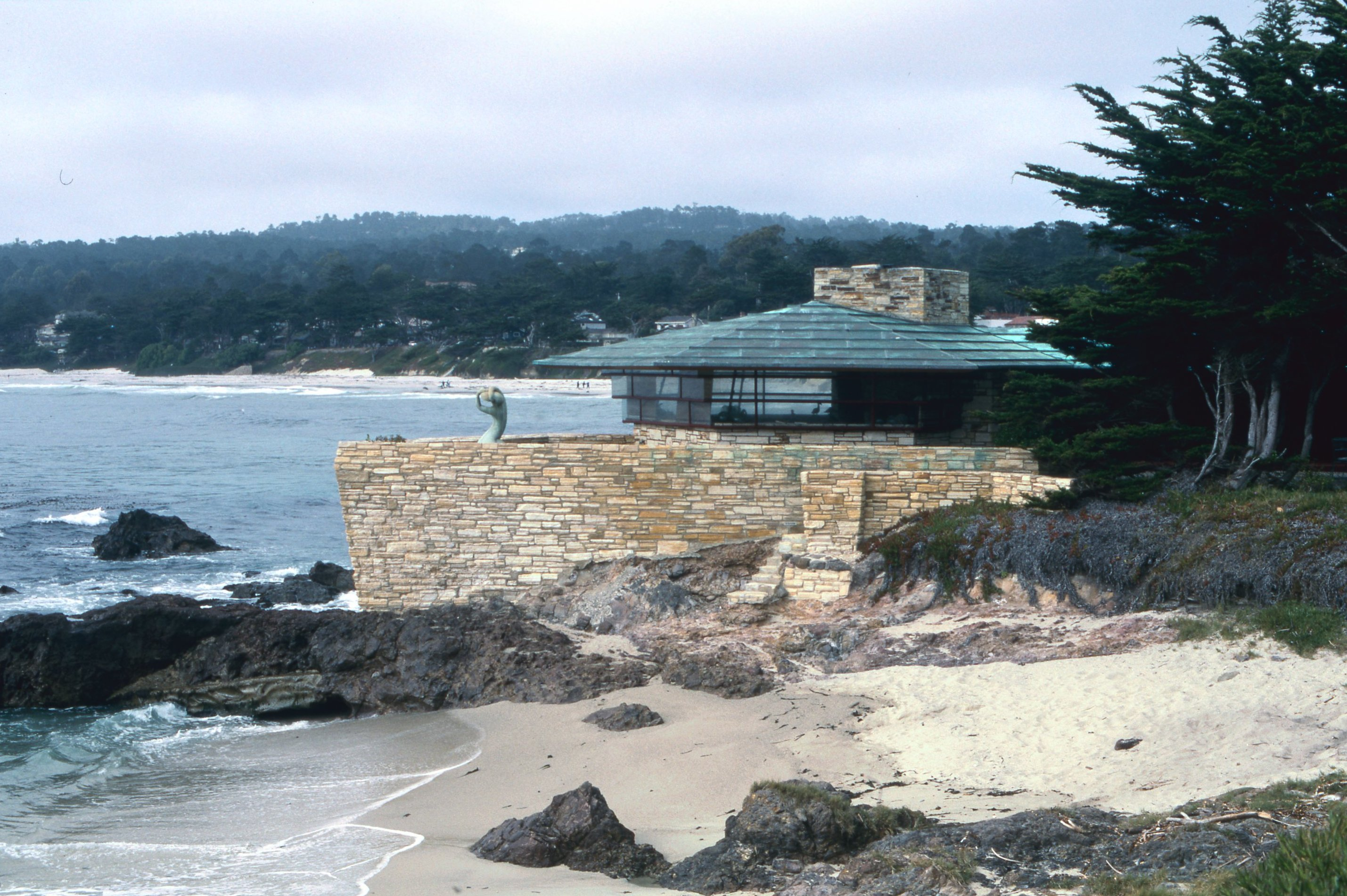
Side view of Mrs. Clinton Walker House

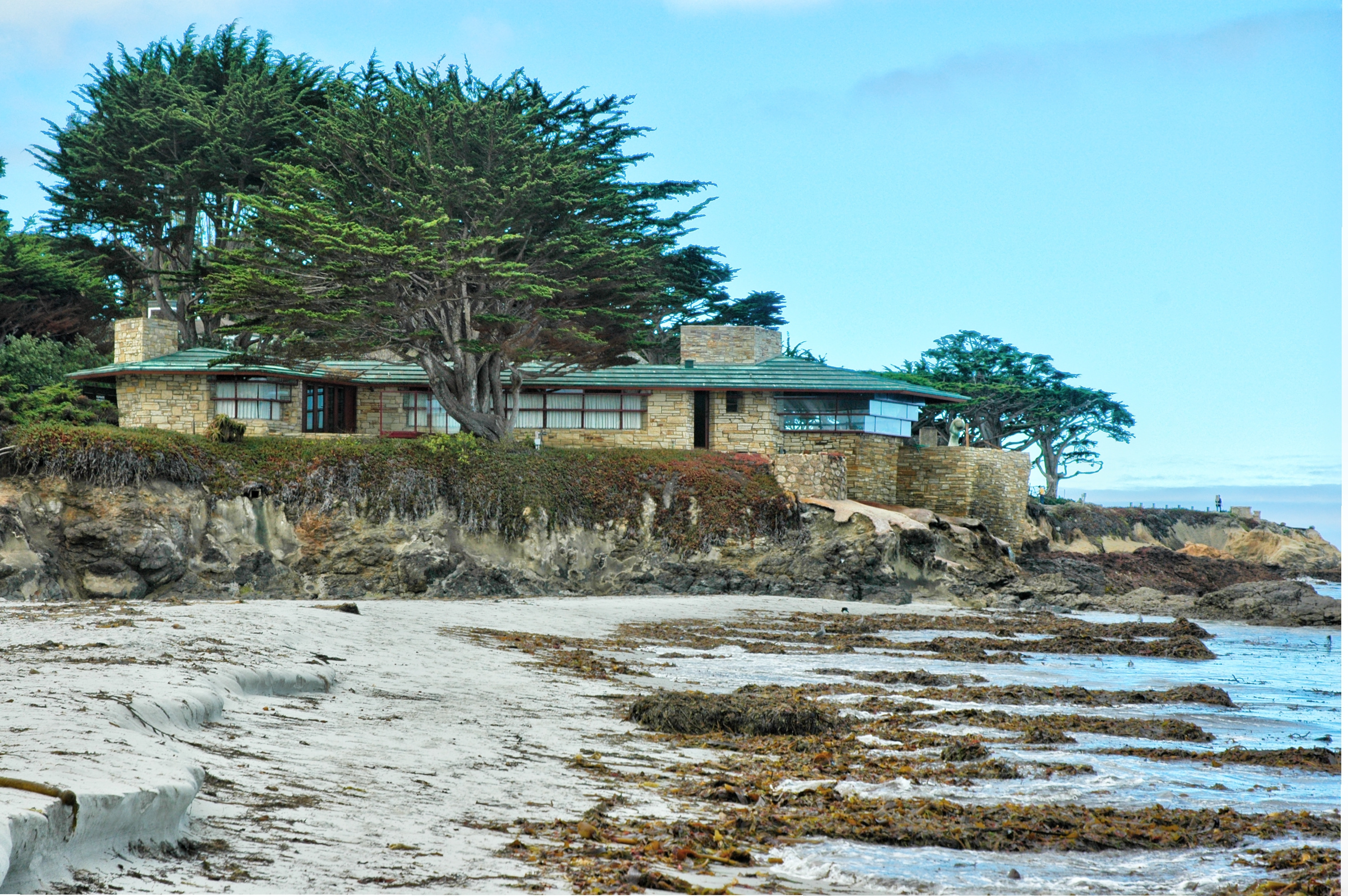
Ocean view of Mrs. Clinton Walker House

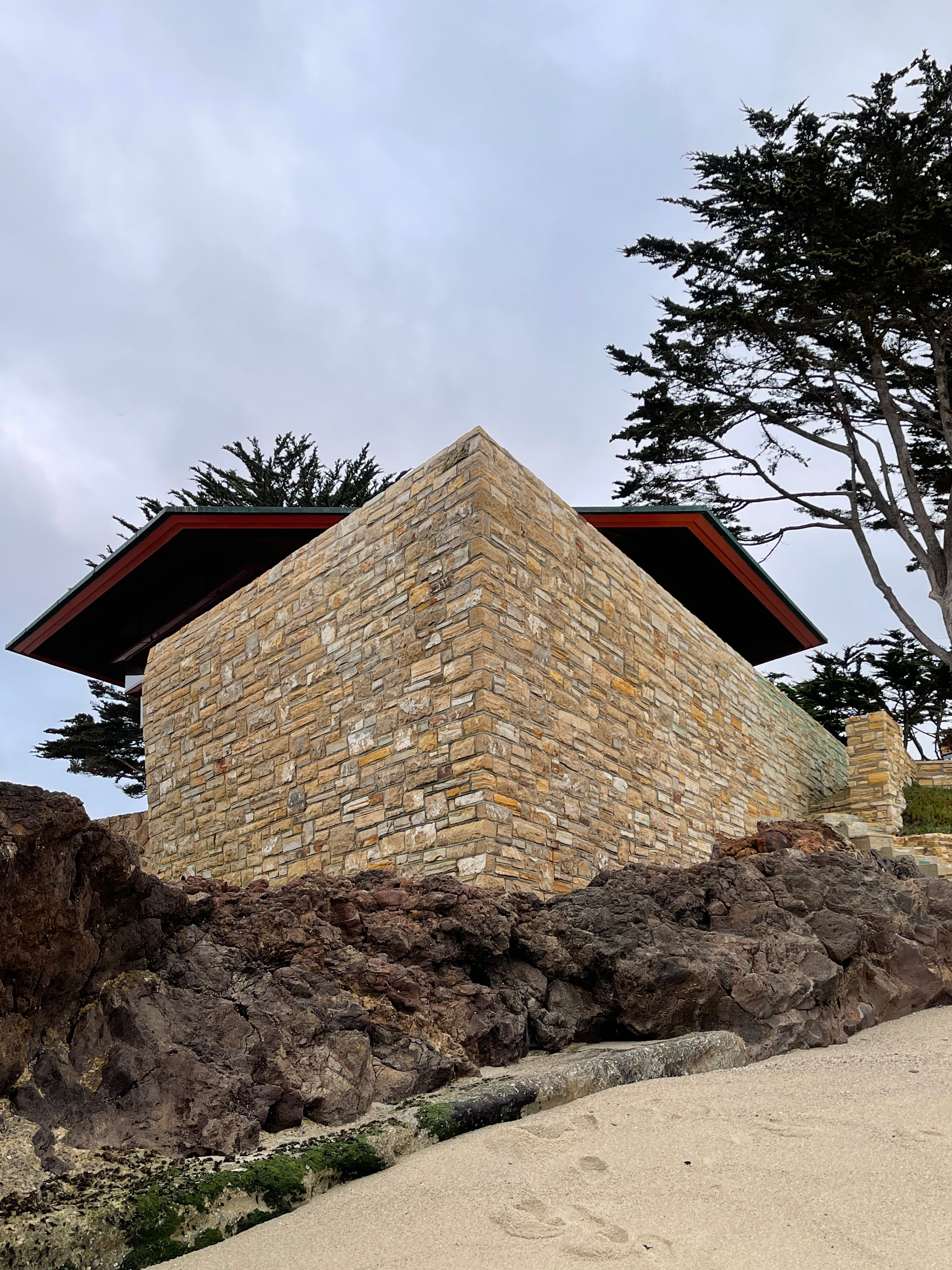
Prow view of Clinton Walker House

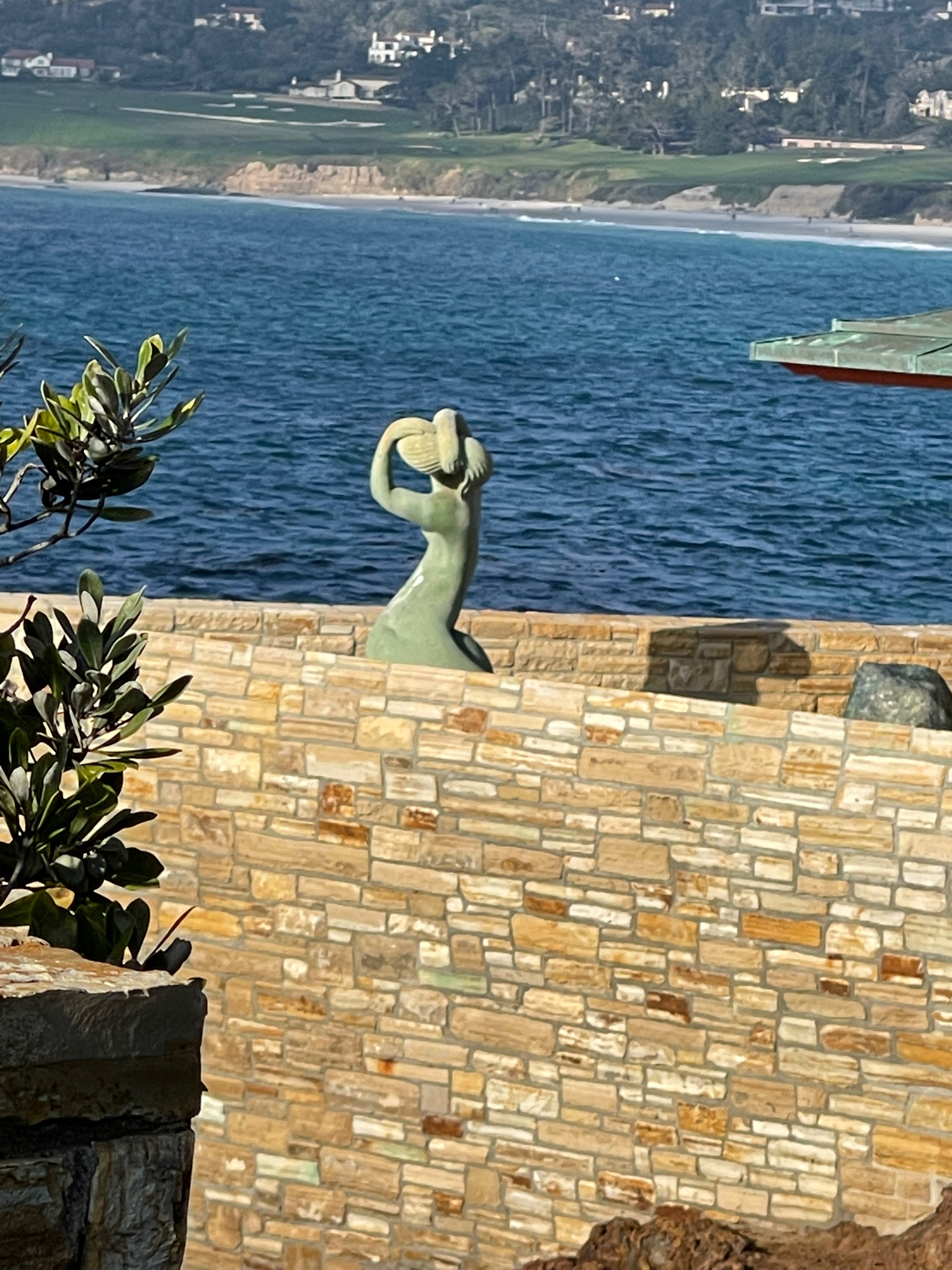
Undine mermaid sculpture at the Mrs. Clinton Walker House

== See also ==
- List of Frank Lloyd Wright works
- National Register of Historic Places listings in Monterey County, California
