= The Man in the Gray Flannel Suit II =

Novel by Sloan Wilson

First edition

The Man in the Gray Flannel Suit II is a novel by writer Sloan Wilson. A sequel to The Man in the Gray Flannel Suit (1955), it was published in 1984, nearly thirty years after its original.

== Synopsis ==
The novel focuses on the lives of most of the characters from the first novel as they approach middle age. Unlike The Man in the Gray Flannel Suit, the sequel is told in the first person: Tom Rath narrates the continuing story of his life.

Some of the first novel's main characters — including Judge Bernstein and the family of Tom's boss, Ralph Hopkins — do not appear in the sequel. One new character is Rath's son, the offspring of a World War II romance in Italy. The son visits his father at the Rath home in Southport, Connecticut only to venture out on his own, eventually enlisting in the United States Army with a tour of duty in South Vietnam. He is killed there, closing the story of Tom Rath's infidelity during his own military service.

The book begins in late 1963, around eight years after the events depicted in The Man in the Gray Flannel Suit. Wilson's narrative tells of the middle-aged Tom Rath in a relationship with a younger woman. Rath meets the younger woman while on assignment to Washington, D. C., to attend a conference on mental health. Rath's boss, Mr. Hopkins, remains interested in the issue and has sent Rath to meet with White House aides. In the turmoil following the assassination of the conference's sponsor, President John F. Kennedy, Rath begins an affair with the young woman assigned to assist him at the conference.

Rath returns home to Connecticut and soon realizes he has fallen in love with the younger woman. He concludes that his marriage of over twenty years is beyond repair. He decides to finally leave his wife, marries the younger woman, and moves to the city of New York to start a new life with her.

Wilson shows Rath's feelings as his marriage breaks up; his estrangement from his three grown children by his wife Betsy; the end of his suburban life in Fairfield County, Connecticut; the happiness and stress of a serious relationship with a younger woman; and the return and, ultimately, death of his Italian son. That Rath ultimately overcomes these events and ends a happy man is the main theme.

The continuation turns Tom's wife, Betsy, into a minor character, using her more as a springboard for events rather than following her life and her emotions. Rath's three children by Betsy get more attention this time, but mainly as benchmarks advancing the notion of the protagonist's new life.

== Reception ==
The Man in the Gray Flannel Suit II was not a commercial success. Many fans felt that the sequel did not live up to the expectations set by the original. The novel marked Wilson's last major effort in fiction writing. His autobiographical memoir What Shall We Wear to The Party?: The Man In The Gray Flannel Suit, Twenty Years Before & After, published in 1976, also marked Wilson's last non-fiction effort. After early success with The Man in the Gray Flannel Suit and A Summer Place in the 1950s — both of which became best-sellers and were made into profitable motion pictures — Wilson crafted ten more books, but none approached those early heights of popularity.
