= My Man Godfrey =

1936 American comedy-drama film directed by Gregory La Cava

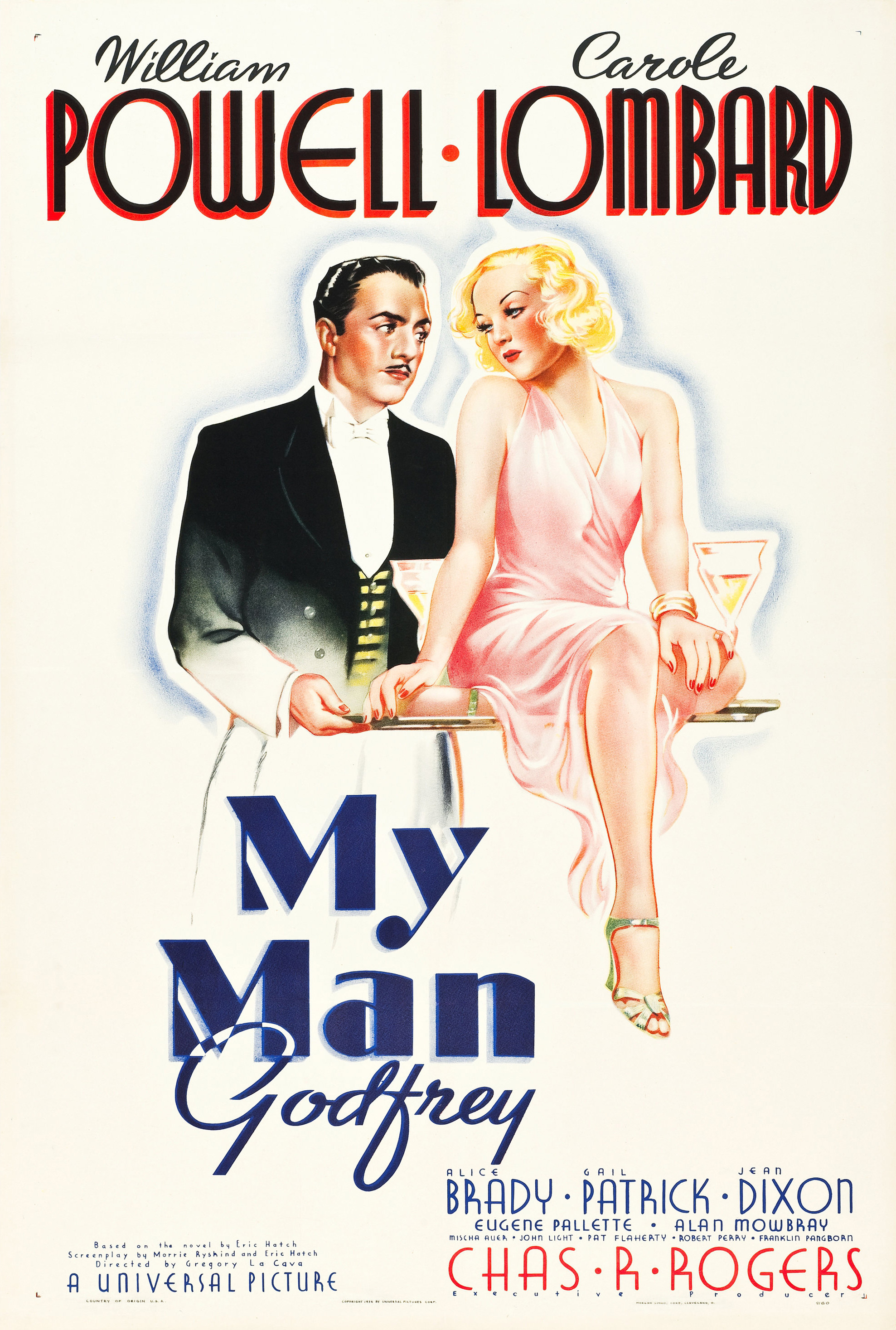
- Theatrical release poster by Karoly Grosz
- Directed by: Gregory La Cava
- Screenplay by: Morrie Ryskind; Eric Hatch; Contributing writers: Zoë Akins; Robert Presnell Sr.
- Based on: 1101 Park Avenue; 1935 novel by Eric Hatch
- Produced by: Charles R. Rogers
- Starring: William Powell; Carole Lombard
- Cinematography: Ted Tetzlaff
- Edited by: Ted J. Kent; Russell F. Schoengarth
- Music by: Charles Previn; Rudy Schrager (both uncredited)
- Production company: Universal Pictures
- Distributed by: Universal Pictures
- Release date: September 6, 1936
- Running time: 94–95 minutes
- Country: United States
- Language: English
- Budget: $575,375
- Box office: $684,200

My Man Godfrey is a 1936 American screwball comedy film directed by Gregory La Cava and starring William Powell and Carole Lombard, who had been briefly married years before appearing together in the film. The screenplay for My Man Godfrey was written by Morrie Ryskind and Eric S. Hatch, with uncredited contributions by La Cava, based on Hatch's 1935 novel, 1101 Park Avenue. The story concerns a socialite who hires a derelict to be her family's butler, and then falls in love with him.

The film was critically acclaimed and was nominated for six Oscars in the 9th Academy Awards, including best actor for leads Powell and Lombard, supporting actors Auer and Brady, director, and screenplay. It has a 97% approval rating on Rotten Tomatoes.

In 1999, the original version of My Man Godfrey was deemed "culturally significant" by the United States Library of Congress and selected for preservation in the National Film Registry. The film was remade in 1957 with June Allyson and David Niven in the starring roles.

== Plot ==
During the Great Depression, Godfrey Smith lives with other homeless men at a New York City dump in a Hooverville by the East River. One night, spoiled socialite Cornelia Bullock offers him $5 to be her "forgotten man" for a scavenger hunt. Godfrey refuses and makes her retreat and fall on a pile of ashes, much to the glee of her younger sister Irene. Godfrey finds Irene kind and offers to go with her to help her beat Cornelia and satisfy his curiosity regarding their scavenger hunt.

In the ballroom of the Waldorf-Ritz Hotel, Irene's businessman father, Alexander Bullock, waits resignedly as his ditsy wife, Angelica, and her mooching protégé, Carlo, play the game. Godfrey is authenticated as a "forgotten man", allowing Irene to win that part of the hunt. He takes the opportunity to publicly express his contempt for the players' antics before leaving in a huff. An apologetic Irene decides to make Godfrey her protégé and hires him as the new family butler.

On his first day as butler, Godfrey is warned by the Bullocks' longtime maid, Molly, that he is the latest in a long line of butlers who did not last long due to the female Bullocks' antics. Despite this, he is up to the challenge, though Cornelia holds a grudge against him. Irene becomes infatuated with Godfrey, and he tries unsuccessfully to discourage her. She kisses him, causing him to politely but firmly outline the boundaries of their employee-employer relationship.

Eventually, Godfrey is recognized by his longtime friend Tommy Gray at a tea party thrown by Irene. Godfrey makes up a story that he was Tommy's valet at Harvard; Tommy plays along by embellishing Godfrey's story with a nonexistent wife and five children. Upon hearing this, Irene impulsively announces her engagement to a surprised Charlie Van Rumple, but breaks down in tears and flees after being congratulated by Godfrey.

Over lunch the next day, Tommy wonders what one of the elite "Parkes of Boston" is doing as a servant. Godfrey explains that when he lost the woman he loved, he considered suicide, but the undaunted attitude of the homeless men living at the dump rekindled his spirits.

Eventually, Irene breaks her engagement with Charlie. Cornelia attempts to seduce Godfrey on his day off, but when he rebuffs her, she plants her pearl necklace under Godfrey's mattress and calls the police to report it missing. However, the police do not find it. Mr. Bullock realizes his daughter has orchestrated the whole thing and informs her that the pearls are not insured.

The Bullocks send their daughters to Europe to help Irene get over her broken engagement to Charlie, but when they return, her feelings for Godfrey have not changed. She stages a fainting spell and swoons into Godfrey's arms, who soon realizes she is faking it. Godfrey puts her in the shower and turns on the cold water. This, however, has an unexpected result. Irene says, "Oh Godfrey, now I know you love me...You do or you wouldn't have lost your temper."

Godfrey quits. Before he leaves, Mr. Bullock throws Carlo out (literally) and tells his family that his business is in dire straits, and he likely will go to jail. However, Godfrey provides good news; when he realized Mr. Bullock's situation, sold short, using some of the money raised by pawning Cornelia's pearl necklace to buy up the stock that Bullock had sold. He returns the stock to Mr. Bullock, saving the family from financial ruin. Godfrey also returns the necklace to Cornelia, who humbly expresses her gratitude and remorse for her behavior.

With the rest of the money Godfrey got for Cornelia's necklace, Tommy and he become business partners and convert the now-filled-in dump into a fashionable nightclub called "The Dump", which creates jobs for the homeless men with a plan to build housing for 50 of them. A determined Irene tracks Godfrey to his office and apartment at The Dump, makes it clear that she is moving in, and when Tommy sends in New York's mayor to marry them, Irene leads a startled Godfrey up by the hand and says, "Stand still, Godfrey, it'll all be over in a minute".

== Cast ==
Eugene Pallette, Mischa Auer and Alice Brady in My Man Godfrey

- William Powell as Godfrey Parke (aka Smith)
- Carole Lombard as Irene Bullock
- Alice Brady as Angelica Bullock
- Gail Patrick as Cornelia Bullock
- Jean Dixon as Molly
- Eugene Pallette as Alexander Bullock
- Alan Mowbray as Tommy Gray
- Mischa Auer as Carlo
- Pat Flaherty as Mike Flaherty
- Robert Light as Faithful George
- Grady Sutton as Charlie Van Rumple (uncredited)
- Franklin Pangborn as Scavenger Hunt Judge (uncredited)
- Bess Flowers as Mrs. Merriweather (uncredited)
- Grace Field as a socialite (uncredited)
- Jane Wyman as a socialite (uncredited)

== Production ==
The film is based on the 1935 Eric S. Hatch novel, 1101 Park Avenue. Charles Rogers, head of Universal, called it "a sure-fire laugh-getting novel". That studio purchased the film rights and assigned Hatch to write the script with Morrie Ryskind, who received top billing for the screenplay. Rogers hired Gregory La Cava to direct, "the best comedy director in Hollywood."

=== Casting ===
It was the first major film from Universal after that studio had been taken over by new management, including head of production Charles Rogers. However, the studio did not have any major stars under contract apart from Buck Jones, Boris Karloff, and Edward Everett Horton, and needed to borrow some from other studios.

The studio's original choice to play Irene, the part eventually played by Carole Lombard, was Constance Bennett, and Miriam Hopkins also was considered, but director Gregory La Cava would only agree to Bennett if Universal borrowed William Powell from MGM. Powell, for his part, only would take the role if Carole Lombard played Irene. Powell and Lombard had divorced three years earlier, but remained good friends.

Powell's casting was announced in January 1936. Universal borrowed Lombard from Paramount. As part of the deal, Universal loaned Paramount's Margaret Sullavan for the film I Love a Soldier, and Lombard's clothes designer, Travis Banton, accompanied her. Alice Brady joined the cast in March.

=== Shooting ===
My Man Godfrey was in production from April 15 to May 27, 1936, and then had retakes in early June of the year. Its budget was $575,375; Powell was paid $87,500 and Lombard $45,645. The film was one of the first under the new regime of Charles Rogers at Universal, although it had been developed under his predecessor, Carl Laemmle Jr.

La Cava, a former animator and freelancer for most of his film career, held studio executives in contempt and was known to be a bit eccentric. When Powell and he hit a snag over a disagreement about how Godfrey should be portrayed, they settled things over a bottle of Scotch. The next morning, La Cava showed up for shooting with a headache, but Powell did not appear. Instead, the actor sent a telegram stating: "WE MAY HAVE FOUND GODFREY LAST NIGHT BUT WE LOST POWELL. SEE YOU TOMORROW."

Due to insurance considerations, a stand-in stuntman (Chick Collins) was used when Godfrey carried Irene over his shoulder up the stairs to her bedroom.

In a premiere special in the Los Angeles Times, Universal producer Rogers said the key to the film's production was to make "everyone connected with the picture" feel "a happy-go-lucky mood" and "keep them laughing... madder and merrier the better", "while you're shooting the picture." Film crew described star Lombard as "a good egg" who "never stands on ceremony,... impulsive,... outspoken... extremely frank", always "gay", and particularly "a friend to everyone" who worked with her. They also called Powell as "a good egg" and humble, who asked for no special considerations, and praised others' work.

When tensions hit a high point on the set, Lombard had a habit of cursing, often to the great amusement of the cast. This made shooting somewhat difficult, but clips of her cursing in her dialogue and messing up her lines can still be seen and heard in blooper reels, along with cursing from Powell.

== Release and reception ==
=== Original ===
It was the first film released under the aegis of Charles Rogers and was given a big premiere at the Pantages Theatre in Hollywood, with comedian George Jessel as master of ceremonies. My Man Godfrey premiered on September 6, 1936, and was released in the United States on September 17. It was a runaway hit and earned huge profits for the studio.

The movie was one of the most acclaimed comedies of 1936. Variety called it a "splendidly produced comedy," with Powell and Lombard "pleasantly teamed" as Lombard plays the most "screwy" of the various "screwball dames" she has ever played.

Writing for The Spectator in 1936, Graham Greene gave the film a moderately positive review, characterizing it as "acutely funny" for three-quarters of its way. Particularly praising the scene of the scavenging party, Greene finds it to be "perhaps the wittiest, as well as noisiest, sequence of the year". Considering the end of the film, however, he notes that "the social conscience is a little confused" and he wishes for a more "dignified exit".

=== Modern ===
Modern critics have praised it as enduring amusement, and truth, and as a "landmark" icon of the 1930s screwball comedy film concept, and the overall craft of filmmaking.

In 1999, the film was selected for preservation in the Library of Congress's National Film Registry of motion pictures "selected for... historical, cultural and aesthetic contributions," saying that "Carole Lombard sparkles [at] one of her greatest roles," in this "comedic take and sometimes caustic commentary on the Great Depression," adding "William Powell portrays Godfrey with knife-edged delivery," in "one of the most exemplary screwball comedies of the 1930s." The registry also praises Ted Tetzlaff's black-and-white cinematography.

In 2023, Time selected it as one of its 100 Best Movies of the Last 10 Decades, placing it among "the greatest romantic comedies" to come out of that "decade full of terrific ones."

"God,... this film is beautiful," declared critic Roger Ebert, who praised the cinematography as "a shimmering argument" for the virtues of films produced in black-and-white, rather than color. He praised the film, and "the actors in it,... its style of production," even... "the system that produced it," as an escape from today's "pop culture of brainless vulgarity."

Pauline Kael called it an "entertaining (and hugely successful) screwball comedy ... The movie starts out with a promising satiric idea and winds up in box-office romance, but it's likable and well-paced even at its silliest. Lombard shrieks happily and Powell modulates impeccably." Leonard Maltin gave it four of four stars: "Delightful romp with Lombard and crazy household hiring Powell as butler ... But Pallette—as harried head of household—has some of the best lines." Leslie Halliwell gave it three of four stars: "Archetypal Depression concept which is also one of the best of the thirties crazy sophisticated comedies ... "

Critics have also praised the elegant set design and costumes, particularly Travis Banton's costume designs.

== Awards and honors ==
Year	Award ceremony	Category	Nominee	Result
1937	Academy Awards	Best Director	Gregory La Cava	Nominated
1937	Academy Awards	Best Actor	William Powell	Nominated
1937	Academy Awards	Best Actress	Carole Lombard	Nominated
1937	Academy Awards	Best Supporting Actor	Mischa Auer	Nominated
1937	Academy Awards	Best Supporting Actress	Alice Brady	Nominated
1937	Academy Awards	Best Adapted Screenplay	Eric Hatch, Morrie Ryskind	Nominated

My Man Godfrey was the first movie to be nominated in all four acting categories, in the first year that supporting categories were introduced. It is also the only film in Oscar history to receive a nomination in all four acting categories and not be nominated for Best Picture. It was the only film to be nominated in these six categories and not receive any award until 2013's American Hustle.

In 1999, the film was deemed "culturally significant" by the United States Library of Congress and selected for preservation in the National Film Registry. In 2000, the film was ranked #44 on the American Film Institute's list of the 100 funniest comedies, and Premiere voted it one of "The 50 Greatest Comedies Of All Time" in 2006. On the review aggregator website Rotten Tomatoes, it has an approval score of 97% based on 37 reviews, with an average rating of 8.5/10. The consensus for the film states: "A class satire in a class of its own, My Man Godfrey's screwball comedy is as sharp as the social commentary is biting."

== Public domain status ==
The original film is generally thought to have entered into the public domain in 1965 when the film's copyright was not renewed after 28 years. However the underlying work, the 1935 book 1101 Park Avenue – re-titled My Man Godfrey with the film's release – had its copyright renewed in 1963 and is thus still in copyright. According to Stanford University Library, and under rulings of the 1990 case Stewart v. Abend, in so-called multilayered works, the rights holder of the original work can claim ownership of the film script, though not the pictures, if the original book is still in copyright. "Films are often based on books ... that may maintain copyright. If the pre-existing work is protected, then rightly or wrongly, it has generally been determined that the derived film is also protected."

== Home media ==
While public domain videos of the film had been issued by several different distributors in the preceding years, the film had its first official video release on January 12, 1994, from MCA/Universal Home Video. In 2002, a restored print was made available on DVD by The Criterion Collection, which featured a new cover illustrated by Michael Koelsch. In 2005, 20th Century Fox Home Video released a colorized version. In September 2018, Criterion released the film on Blu-ray with new supplements.

== Remakes and adaptations ==
My Man Godfrey was twice adapted as a one-hour radio broadcast on Lux Radio Theatre: on May 9, 1938, with David Niven playing the part of Tommy Gray; and on November 9, 1954, with Jeff Chandler and Julie Adams. It was also adapted to radio in a half-hour version on the October 2, 1946, episode of Academy Award Theater, again starring William Powell. When the film was remade in 1957, David Niven played Godfrey opposite June Allyson, directed by Henry Koster. A stage musical version of My Man Godfrey, produced by Allan Carr and written by librettists Alan Jay Lerner and Kristi Kane and composer Gerard Kenny, was intended for Broadway in 1985, but remained uncompleted at the time of Alan Jay Lerner's death in 1986.

== See also ==
- Public domain film
- List of American films of 1936
- List of films in the public domain in the United States
