= Walker family =

American family

The Walker family came to prominence via its progenitor, T. B. Walker (Thomas Barlow Walker), a highly successful American businessman who acquired timber in Minnesota and California and built one of the largest forest products corporations in the nation at the time. He collected art that he made available to the public, and founded the Minneapolis Public Library. He is also the founder and namesake of the Walker Art Center in Minneapolis. Descendants of his son, Clinton Walker, continue to live in Northern California and own 142,500 acres of Forest Stewardship Council (FSC)-certified sustainable timberland known as Shasta Forests.

== Early family history and business interests ==
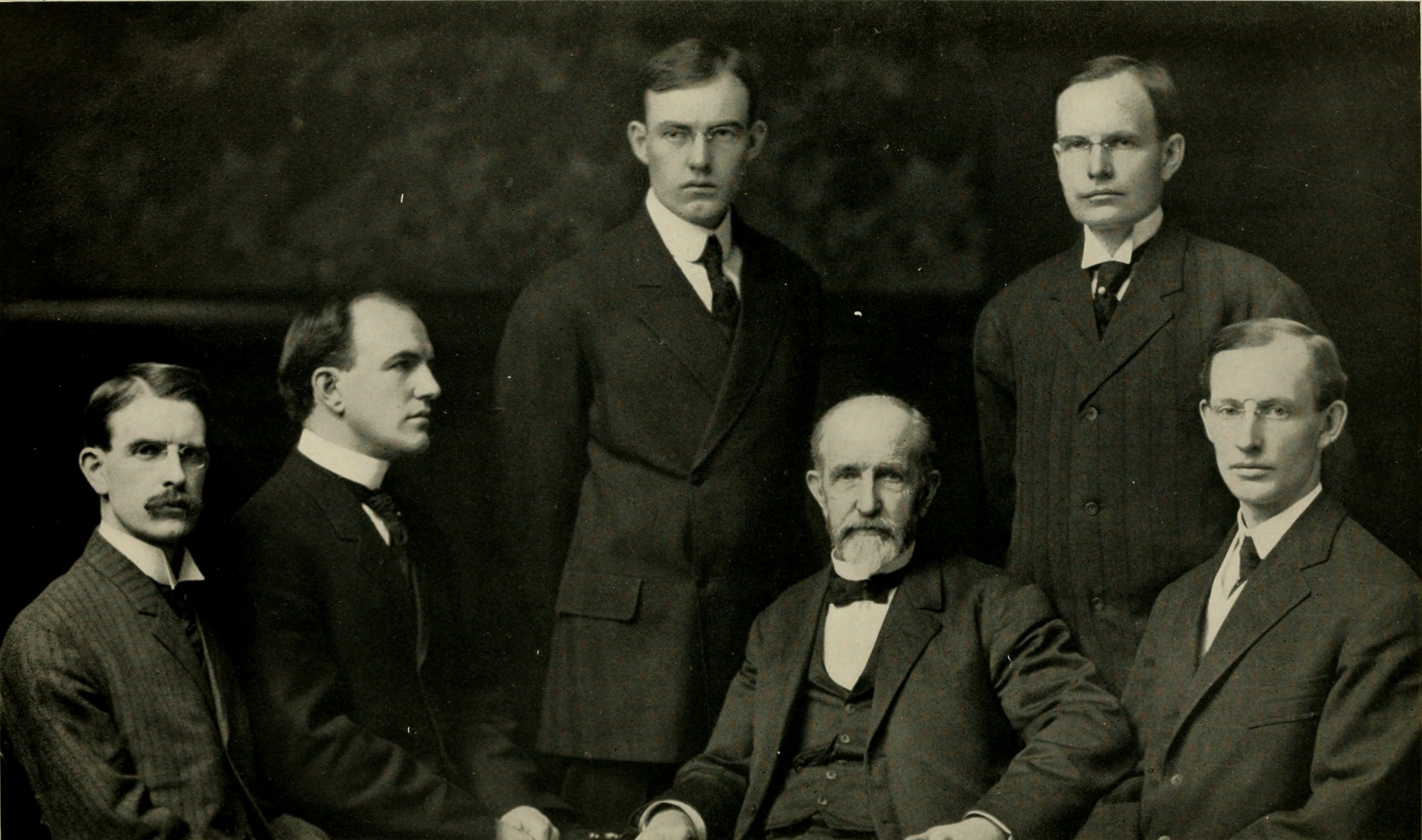
T. B. Walker and his five living sons, 1907. Left to right: Fletcher, Willis, Archie, T. B. (seated), Gilbert and Clinton in 1907.

T. B. Walker (February 1, 1840 – July 28, 1928) was born in Xenia, Ohio, to Platt Bayless Walker (1808–1849) and Anstis Keziah Barlow Walker (1814–1883). Walker married his college classmate and boss's daughter Harriet Granger Hulet (1841–1917) in 1863, with whom he had eight children. In 1862 Walker moved to Minnesota and got a job as a deputy pine surveyor, enabling him to become familiar with the timber tracts in northern Minnesota. This knowledge became the basis of his wealth in the timber business. Walker went on to form many timber business partnerships in Minnesota beginning in 1867. Despite the economic Depression of the 1890s that stunted much of Minneapolis's growth, T. B. Walker is credited with much of the city's industrial development, including building many factories, the commercial market, a streetcar line, the Walker/Syndicate building, a Methodist church, as well as hotels he built for workers and builders of the factories.

The Walker family's flagship business, the Red River Lumber Company (RRLC), was formed in 1884. It built and operated mills in Minnesota, South Dakota, and Northern California. RRLC was also the "home" of legendary character Paul Bunyan. Stories about Bunyan, a mythical lumber jack, were created by RRLC's publicist using local lumber jack stories. Bunyan eventually became synonymous with RRLC products. Walker's sons took control of RRLC soon after the first mill in California was built in 1912. Walker built several company towns during this time including Akeley, Minnesota, and Westwood, California.

Clinton Walker, whose descendants live in Northern California today, was the fifth son of T. B. Walker. He married Della Brooks circa 1901. They had three children: son Brooks Walker (1902–1984), and daughters Harriet E. Walker Henderson (1904–2007) and Alma Virginia Walker Hearst McKeever (1908–1971). He worked for his father and RRLC at various times throughout his life. He also invented automotive parts and accessories and invested in filmmaking.

Harriet died in New York while on a 1917 business trip there with her husband. T. B. Walker died at his home in Minneapolis on July 28, 1928, at the age of 88.

== Recent family history and business interests ==
Red River Lumber Company eventually became Shasta Forests Company in the 1940s. Over the last four decades the Walker family has managed much of their California timber land as an ongoing forest investment. Reflecting a commitment to sustainable forestry practices, management of Shasta Forests has engaged in tree farming and selective cutting practices to enable sustainable timber production and healthy forest ecosystems, including clean water, productive soils, wildlife habitat, forage, aesthetics and recreational opportunities. Shasta Forests is one of the first timber landowners in California to become FSC-certified. By harvesting less than growth and leaving the best trees to grow the timber volume, Shasta Forests has doubled and the forests are now healthier and more vigorous. The yield taxes paid by Shasta Forests and the jobs created directly and indirectly as a result of timber production have generated millions of dollars in federal, state and local tax revenues.

== Philanthropy ==
=== Walker Art Center ===
T. B. Walker was a lifelong art collector who was committed to making his collection available to the public. In 1879 he opened up his home in order to let the public view his personal collection and by 1915 approximately 100,000 people viewed the collection every year. By 1926 T. B. Walker built a gallery building where the present-day Walker Art Center is now located. After the city of Minneapolis refused to accept Walker's collection and gallery as a gift, the T. B. Walker Foundation, Inc. was formed in 1925 to own and manage it. Most of his collection was given away or sold to buy modern works.

T. B. Walker established the current site of the Walker Art Center in 1927. It was the first public art gallery in the Upper Midwest and is now considered one of the top museums in the United States for modern art.

=== Minneapolis Public Library ===
T. B. Walker is largely responsible for building the Minneapolis Public Library system. He was a director and president of the library board from its founding in 1885 until he died in 1928.

== Family members ==
- Platt Bayless Walker (1808–1849)
- Anstis Keziah Barlow Walker (1814–1883)
  - T. B. Walker (1840–1928) married Harriet Granger Hulet (1841–1917)
    - Gilbert M. Walker (1864–1928)
    - Julia A. Walker (1865?–1952?)
    - Leon B. Walker (1868–1887)
    - Harriet Walker (1870–1904)
    - Fletcher L. Walker (1872–1962)
    - Willis J. Walker (1873–1943)
    - Archie D. Walker (1882–1971)
    - Clinton L. Walker (1875–1944) married Della Brooks; builder of the Mrs. Clinton Walker House
      - Brooks Walker (1902–1984)
      - Harriet E. Walker Henderson (1904–2007)
      - Alma Virginia Walker Hearst McKeever (1908–1971).

== Recent family members ==
=== Brooks Walker Jr. ===
Brooks Walker Jr. is the former chairman of the board of USL Capital Corporation, director at the Schwab Charitable Fund, and a Korean War veteran. He has served on the boards of many private sector and civic organizations including Planned Parenthood/Alameda-S.F., the San Francisco Museum of Modern Art where as chairman he oversaw the building of the new SFMOMA, the San Francisco Foundation, the Fort Mason Foundation, the Addiction Research Foundation, Children's Hospital in San Francisco, the Walker Art Center, Gap Co., and San Francisco Real Estate Investors.

=== John Clinton Walker ===
John Clinton Walker is founding partner of Walker and Moody Architects, an architecture firm based in San Francisco. He has been a trustee of the San Francisco Art Institute for over 30 years.

=== Brooks Walker III ===
Brooks Walker III is founding partner of Walker/Warner Architects, Inc., a firm specializing in residential projects. He is active in the San Francisco Planning and Urban Research Association (SPUR), the Ploughshares Fund, and previously served on the boards of the Walker Art Center and Aim High Academy. Walker received his Bachelor of Architecture from the University of Oregon. He is married to Summer Tompkins; they have three children together.

=== Ann M. Hatch ===
Ann M. Hatch, T. B. Walker’s great-granddaughter, is a San Francisco native and long time philanthropist in the areas of civic enhancement, arts and education. She is a current trustee and former board chair of the California College of the Arts (CCA) in San Francisco, and has served on the boards of the Berkeley Art Museum, the Oakland Museum of California, the Addison Gallery of American Art at Phillips Academy in Andover, MA, Intersection for the Arts, the Walker Art Center, and the Telegraph Hill Neighborhood Center. Ann co-founded the Oxbow School in 1997, an independent high school for the arts in Napa, California, and the Capp Street Project, a nationally recognized artist residency program.

Ann is the recipient of many awards and honors, including honorary doctorates from California College of the Arts and the San Francisco Art Institute and an award for achievement in the prevention of child abuse. In 1991 San Francisco Mayor Art Agnos declared January 31 Ann Hatch Day in recognition of her outstanding contributions to the community. She holds a Bachelor of Fine Arts from Tufts University and the School of the Museum of Fine Arts, Boston.

=== Kirby Walker ===
Kirby Walker is an independent documentary and educational filmmaker/video producer who has a commitment to public lands, the environment and at-risk youth. She has served as a Trustee and Honorary Trustee of the Natural Resources Defense Council (NRDC) since 1983. She also serves on the Advisory Committee of the Golden Gate National Parks Conservancy (GGNPC) and of Summer Search San Francisco. She has an undergraduate degree from the University of Colorado and a Masters in Communication from Stanford University. She is married to Paul Danielsen and lives in San Francisco.

=== Jennifer Walker ===
Jennifer Walker, a 7th generation Californian, is an event designer/planner and has donated services for non-profit organizations in need of assistance in their annual fundraising efforts for the last 12 years. Jennifer is a practicing ceramic artist inspired years ago while volunteering at Creative Growth Art Center for mentally and physically disabled artists living in the East Bay. She currently serves on the board of the Oakland Museum of California. She is married to Michael Keenan, president of Keenan Winery; they have two grown children together. Jennifer also has a twin sister living in Colorado.
