= Sloan Wilson =

American writer (1920–2003)

- Born: May 8, 1920; Norwalk, Connecticut, U.S.
- Died: May 25, 2003 (aged 83); Colonial Beach, Virginia, U.S.
- Education: Harvard University
- Spouses: Elise Pickhardt (m. 1941; div. 1962) Betty Stephens (m. 1962)
- Children: 4, including David
- Relatives: John Wilson Danenhower (grandfather); Katie Wilson (granddaughter)

Sloan Wilson (May 8, 1920 – May 25, 2003) was an American writer who published works including The Man in the Gray Flannel Suit.

== Early life ==
Wilson was born in Norwalk, Connecticut, the grandson of United States Navy officer and Arctic explorer John Wilson Danenhower. He graduated from Harvard University in Cambridge, Massachusetts in 1942. He then served in World War II as an officer of the United States Coast Guard commanding a naval trawler for the Greenland Patrol and an army supply ship in the Pacific Ocean.

== Career ==
After the war, Wilson worked as a reporter for Time-Life. His first book, Voyage to Somewhere, was published in 1947 and was based on his wartime experiences. He published stories in The New Yorker and worked as a professor at the University at Buffalo also known as the State University of New York at Buffalo.

Wilson published 15 books including the bestsellers The Man in the Gray Flannel Suit (1955) and A Summer Place (1958), both were adapted into feature films. A later novel, A Sense of Values, in which protagonist Nathan Bond is a disenchanted cartoonist involved with adultery and alcoholism, was not well received. In Georgie Winthrop, a college vice president, 45, begins a relationship with the 17-year-old daughter of his childhood love. The novel, The Ice Brothers, is loosely based on Wilson's experiences in Greenland while serving with the U.S. Coast Guard. What Shall We Wear to This Party?, a memoir, recalls his experiences in the Coast Guard during World War II and the changes to his life after the bestseller Gray Flannel was published. Wilson was an advocate for integrating, funding, and improving public schools. He became the assistant director of the National Citizens Commission for Public Schools as well as assistant director of the 1955–1956 White House Conference on Education.

== Personal life ==
Wilson suffered from alcoholism throughout his adult life and Alzheimer's disease toward the end. In addition to novels and magazine articles, he supported himself during his later years by writing commissioned works like biographies and yacht histories.

Wilson was married twice, first to Elise Pickhardt in 1941. They had three children including the evolutionary biologist David Sloan Wilson. He and Betty Stephens married in 1962 and they had a daughter. In the 1970s, Wilson and his wife and daughter lived at Dinner Key Marina in Coconut Grove, Florida (an area in Miami) on a 54 ft (16 m) cruiser, the Pretty Betty. Sloan Wilson died May 25, 2003, at 83, in the sailing community of Colonial Beach, Virginia, where he had lived on a boat for several years prior to his death.

== Bibliography ==
=== Novels ===
- Voyage to Somewhere (1947)
- The Man in the Gray Flannel Suit (1955)
- A Summer Place (1958)
- A Sense of Values (1961)
- Georgie Winthrop (1963)
- Janus Island (1967)
- All the Best People (1971)
- Small Town (1978)
- Ice Brothers (1979)
- Greatest Crime (1980)
- Pacific Interlude (1982)
- The Man in the Gray Flannel Suit II (1984)

=== Autobiographies ===
- Away from It All (1969)
- What Shall We Wear to This Party?: The Man in the Gray Flannel Suit, Twenty Years Before & After (1976)

=== Short fiction (all published in The New Yorker unless noted) ===
- "The Best and Most Powerful Machines" (Harper's Magazine, June 1946)
- "The Octopus" (June 1946)
- "The Wonderful Plans" (December 1946)
- "Check for $90,000" (February 1947)
- "Bearer of Bad Tidings" (March 1947)
- "Housewarming" (May 1947)
- "A Very Old Man" (September 1947)
- "Drunk on the Train" (January 1948)
- "The Reunion" ( March 1948)
- "Bygones" (June 1949)
- "The Alarm Clock" (February 1951)
- "The Powder Keg" (October 1951)
- "The Black Mollies" (December 1951)
- "A Sword for my Children" (December 1951), not published in The New Yorker
- "A Letter of Admonition" (December 1951), not published in The New Yorker
- "Citation" (February 1952), not published in The New Yorker
- "The Cook and the Book" (April 1952)
- "The Disappearance" (May 1952)
- "The News" (June 1952)
- "The Regatta" (June 1952)
- "A Friendship Sloop" (April 1953)
- "Lollapalooza and the Rogers Rock Hotel" (October 1953)

=== Poetry ===
- The Soldiers who Sit (The New Yorker, January 1945)
- Cup and Lip (The New Yorker, March 1946)

=== Nonfiction ===
- "Public Schools Are Better Than You Think" (Harper's Magazine, September 1955)
- "It's Time to Close Our Carnival" (Life, March 24, 1958)
- "The American Way of Birth" (Harper's Magazine, July 1964)
- A Love Letter to the Big Ditch (Motor Boating & Sailing (magazine), November 1970)
- "The Heirs of Captain Slocum: Alone At Sea" (Harper's Magazine, August 1980)
