= The Man in the Gray Flannel Suit (novel) =

1955 book by Sloan Wilson

- First edition
- Author: Sloan Wilson
- Language: English
- Genre: Realistic fiction
- Set in: Westport, Connecticut and Manhattan, 1953
- Published: July 18, 1955
- Publisher: Simon & Schuster
- Publication place: United States
- ISBN: 1568582463
- Dewey Decimal: 813.54
- LC Class: PS3573 .I475 .M3
- Website: simonandschuster.com/authors/Sloan-Wilson/256844157

The Man in the Gray Flannel Suit is a 1955 novel by Sloan Wilson about the American search for purpose in a world dominated by business. The main characters, Tom and Betsy Rath, are a young middle-class couple that share a struggle to find contentment in their hectic and material culture, while several other characters fight essentially the same battle, but for different reasons.

The novel was the basis for the popular 1956 film The Man in the Gray Flannel Suit starring Gregory Peck and Jennifer Jones as Tom and Betsy Rath.

== Plot ==
Tom and Betsy Rath live in a rundown house in Westport, Connecticut in 1953. They have three children (two girls and a boy) and money problems. Tom is 33 years old, a Harvard graduate, and works at a Manhattan charitable organization.

Tom barely survived as an Army paratroop officer during World War II, having fought in both the European and Pacific combat theaters; he had an extramarital affair in Italy during the former. He has haunting flashbacks of the affair, as well as his combat experiences; he killed 17 men in combat, including accidentally killing his friend with a hand grenade in the heat of battle. His stay-at-home wife knows only that Tom has somehow "changed" since the war.

One day while reflecting on the inadequacy of his house, Tom runs into a friend who works at the United Broadcasting Corporation, a New York-based television network. This friend encourages Tom to apply for a new opening in public relations. Tom gets the job working for Ralph Hopkins, the top man at the network, an empire-builder surrounded by politicking yes-men. Hopkins is set to propose the establishment of national mental health services to a group of physicians and offer his own prestige and network toward that end. Tom must figure out how his boss can best present the proposal so that the doctors will rise in unison and appoint Hopkins to spearhead the campaign.

Hired on a six-month probationary basis, Tom reports to a humorless game-player who rejects five different drafts of the speech and ends up substituting one of his own. Hopkins is satisfied, but Tom persuades him that the approach is all wrong, that it misrepresents Hopkins' qualifications to head the campaign. Tom's approach is more sensible and Hopkins is impressed. Additionally, Tom reminds Hopkins of his own son, who was killed in combat.

In the end, Tom sees how his boss's marriage and family life have been ruined by overwork, so he turns down a high-pressure position involving travel in order to work normal hours and spend more time at home.

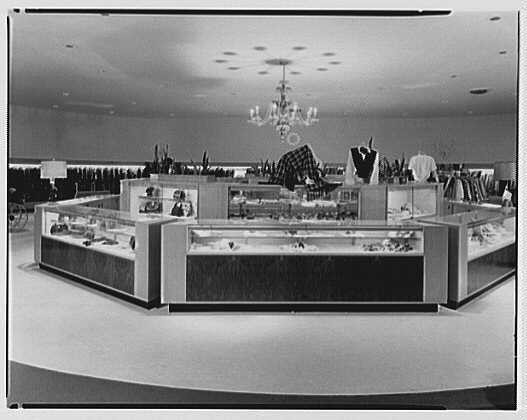
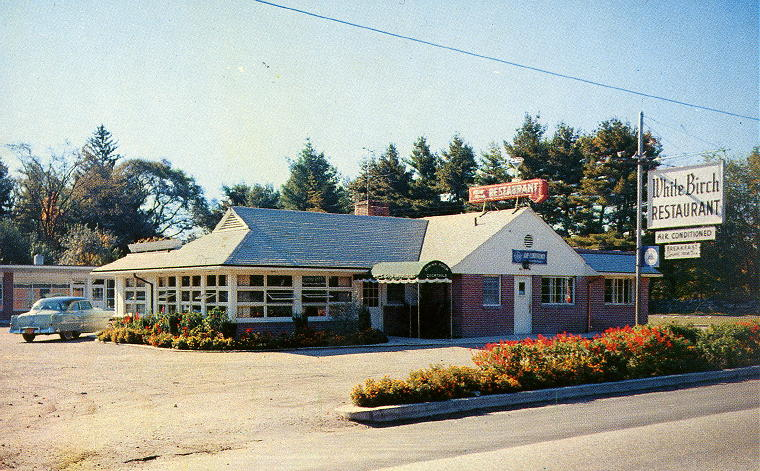
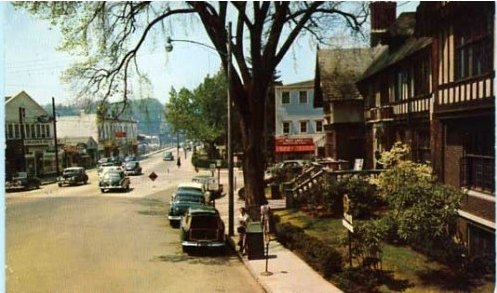
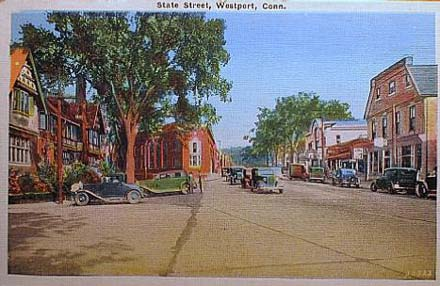
Views of Westport, Conn. in the 1930s–50s

=== Subplots ===
- The fraudulent scheme of the caretaker of Tom's late grandmother, who forged a will in an attempt to inherit the deceased woman's home.
- Hopkins' estrangement from his daughter, who quits school to elope with an undesirable man.
- Tom's wartime affair resulted in a son conceived in Italy, whose mother suddenly contacts him to seek monetary support at a most inconvenient time. With no understanding of the horrors of war, Betsy becomes furious upon learning of this secret and becomes estranged from Tom. However, she comes to understand that mutual emotional support, not just mutual ambition, bind wife and husband.

== Development ==
The book was largely autobiographical. It drew on Wilson's experiences as assistant director of the U.S. National Citizen Commission for Public Schools. The character of Ralph Hopkins, the high-ranking network executive, was based on Roy Larsen, Wilson's real-life boss at Time Inc.

== Reception ==
The novel became a bestseller. "Man in the gray flannel suit" entered the popular vernacular and the symbol has continued to appear for decades in references of sociologists to America's "discontented businessman". Columnist Bob Greene wrote in 1992 that "[t]he title of Sloan Wilson's best-selling novel became part of the American vernacular—the book was a ground-breaking fictional look at conformity in the executive suite, and it was a piece of writing that helped the nation's business community start to examine the effects of its perceived stodginess and sameness."

The book was re-issued in 2002 with a foreword by a contemporary author Jonathan Franzen.

== Film ==
The film that came out in April of the next year followed the success of the novel. Although the film became popular, critics gave it mixed reviews. Its length was sometimes brought into question but it was seen as a "tender and touching film" by The New York Times. Gregory Peck and Jennifer Jones star. The film was directed by Nunnally Johnson. The film focuses on a man coping with domestic reality after the Second World War. Variety held the director responsible for "miss[ing] the point of the book which made the flannel suit a symbol rather than just a garment".

== Sequel ==
Nearly 30 years later, in 1984, Wilson released the sequel The Man in the Gray Flannel Suit II, picking up the story just eight years after the original novel with Tom Rath's story in 1963. The plot of the sequel concerns Tom's extramarital affair with a younger woman, which leads to his subsequent divorce and remarriage, as well as the death of his son in the Vietnam War. Unlike the original novel, the sequel was neither a critical nor a commercial success.
