= In the Kingdom of Ice =

2014 non-fiction book by Hampton Sides

In The Kingdom of Ice: The Grand and Terrible Polar Voyage of the USS Jeannette
- Author: Hampton Sides
- Language: English
- Genre: Nonfiction / American history / World history
- Publisher: Doubleday
- Publication date: 2014
- Publication place: United States
- Pages: 480
- ISBN: 978-0385535373

In The Kingdom of Ice: The Grand and Terrible Polar Voyage of the USS Jeannette (Doubleday), 2014, is a nonfiction book written by the author and historian Hampton Sides. The book tells the true story of the 1879–1881 arctic voyage of the USS Jeannette and the crew's struggle to survive after having to abandon their ship in the polar ice.

== Key figures ==
- James Gordon Bennett, Jr.: Sports enthusiast, owner of the New York Herald newspaper and financier.
- August Heinrich Petermann: German cartographer whose theory helped spawn the polar expedition.

=== Notable crew of the USS Jeannette ===
- George W. De Long: Commander of the expedition and officer in the United States Navy.
- Charles W. Chipp: Lieutenant in the United States Navy and De Long's second-in-command.
- George W. Melville: Engineer, explorer, and officer in the United States Navy. Chief of the Bureau of Steam Engineering.
- John Wilson Danenhower: Explorer and officer in the United States Navy.

== Full officer & crew list ==
Officers and crew of USS Jeanette, July 1879
| Name | Rank or function |
|---|---|
| George W. De Long | Lieutenant, U.S. Navy: ship's captain |
| Charles W. Chipp | Lieutenant, U.S. Navy: executive officer |
| John W. Danenhower | Master, U.S. Navy; navigation officer |
| George W. Melville | Assistant Engineer, U.S. Navy: ship's engineer |
| James M. Ambler | Assistant Surgeon, U.S. Navy: ship's doctor |
| William M. Dunbar | Ice pilot (entered as seaman) |
| Jerome J. Collins | Meteorologist (entered as seaman) |
| Raymond L. Newcomb | Naturalist (entered as seaman) |
| John Cole | Boatswain |
| Walter Lee | Machinist |
| James H. Bartlett | Fireman first class |
| George W. Boyd | Fireman second class |
| Alfred Sweetman | Carpenter |
| William F.C. Nindemann | Seaman |
| Louis P. Noros | Seaman |
| Herbert W. Leach | Seaman |
| Henry Wilson | Seaman |
| Carl A. Görtz | Seaman |
| Peter E. Johnson | Seaman |
| Edward Starr | Seaman |
| Henry D. Warren | Seaman |
| Heinrich H. Kaak | Seaman |
| Albert G. Kuehne | Seaman |
| Frank E. Mansen | Seaman |
| Hans H. Erikson | Seaman |
| Adolph Dressler | Seaman |
| Nelsk Iverson | Seaman |
| Walter Sharvell | Seaman |
| George Lauterbach | Seaman |
| Ah Sam | Cook |
| Charles Tang Sing | Steward |
| Alexey | Hunter (joined ship in Alaska) |
| Aneguin | Hunter (joined ship in Alaska) |

== Notable reviews ==
- Time; 'In The Kingdom of Ice' brings cold comfort.
- The New York Times; Abandon Ship!
- The Miami Herald; 'In the Kingdom of Ice' recreates a disastrous Arctic voyage.
- USA Today; Crack into this harrowing 'Ice' survival tale.
- The Christian Science Monitor; 'In the Kingdom of Ice' follows a disaster-ridden journey to the North Pole.
- The Washington Post; Book review: “In the Kingdom of Ice”.
- The Los Angeles Times; 'Kingdom of Ice' uncovers a polar adventure frozen in time.
- The Wall Street Journal; Book Review: 'In the Kingdom of Ice' by Hampton Sides.

== Media ==
- The Huffington Post; What Can a 19th Century Arctic Shipwreck Tell Us About the 21st Century's Most Wicked Problem?
- The Diane Rehm Show; Hampton Sides: “In the Kingdom of Ice”.
- Weekend Edition (NPR); In 1879, Explorers Set Sail To Solve Arctic Mystery, Once And For All.
- The Wall Street Journal; Why an 1879 Voyage Is a Time Machine for Climate Change.
- Imus in the Morning; A survival story of polar exploration in the Gilded Age.

== See also ==
- Jeannette Expedition
- USS Jeannette (1878)
- Lena Delta
- De Long Islands
