= James Markham Ambler =

American naval surgeon and explorer (1848–1881)

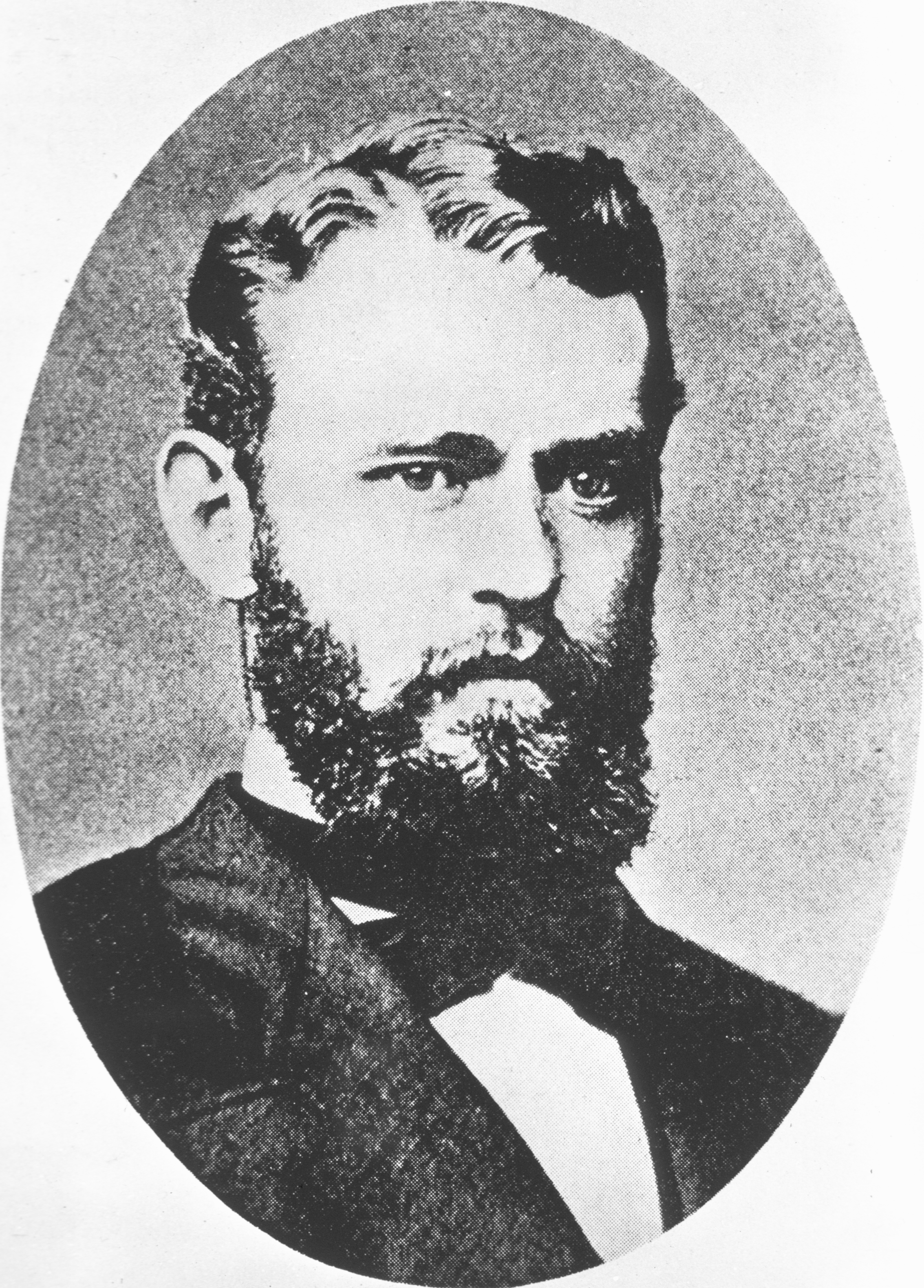
- Ambler, in the records of National Library of Medicine
- Born: December 30, 1848; Markham, Virginia, U.S.
- Died: after October 30, 1881 (aged 32)
- Occupation: Naval surgeon

James Markham Marshall Ambler (December 30, 1848 – October 30, 1881) was an American naval surgeon who served on the USS Jeannette and perished during the Jeannette expedition, in 1881, while attempting to reach the North Pole.

Ambler was born in December 1848 in Markham, Virginia. At the age of sixteen, he served in the 12th Virginia Cavalry Regiment of the Civil War. After studying medicine at Washington College and University of Maryland School of Medicine, Ambler joined the United States Navy as an assistant surgeon. After serving in few ships, he joined George W. De Long in the Jeannette expedition as a medical officer in July 1879. He performed monthly checkups of the crew including giving psychological treatments to the sick and depressed men. Jeannette sank in June 1881; a few months later, when asked either to stay or depart with two crewmen, he decided to remain aboard and provide medical attention to those alive. On October 20, he made the final entry in his journal, anticipating his death. He is presumed to have died after October 30; his body was buried later in 1884.

== Early life and education ==
James Markham Marshall Ambler was born on December 30, 1848, in Markham, Virginia, to the physician Richard Cary Ambler and his wife Susan (née Marshall). Ambler was the eldest of five children. He was named after his maternal grandfather, James Markham Marshall. His paternal ancestor, Richard Ambler, was born in York and came to Yorktown in 1716, where he established himself as a notable tobacco merchant. His maternal ancestor, Edward Jaquelin, who descended from earlier ancestors of the De la Rochejacquelein family, was born in Kent and came to Jamestown in 1697.

At the age of sixteen, Ambler volunteered in the 12th Virginia Cavalry Regiment and served during the late months of the American Civil War. After the war, Ambler entered Washington College and remained there for three years. He later took up studying medicine at the University of Maryland School of Medicine, under Nathan Ryno Smith, who was also his father's preceptor. After graduating in 1870, Ambler became a clinical recorder at the University of Maryland Medical Center and later an assistant physician at the Quarantine Hospital in Baltimore, before entering private practice with J. G. Hollyday.

== United States Navy ==
Ambler was a Confederate cavalryman during the American Civil War (1861–1865) and, after the war in 1874, he was appointed as an assistant surgeon in the United States Navy. He had his first appointment at the United States Naval Academy, followed by a cruise on the USS Kansas, and then was stationed on the USS Minnesota. After his time on the USS Minnesota, in 1877, Ambler joined the staff as an assistant surgeon at the Norfolk Naval Hospital, where he stayed until 1878.

== Jeannette expedition and death ==
Ambler was suggested by his superiors to volunteer aboard the Jeannette expedition to the North Pole as a medical officer. After consultation with his mother, Ambler made the decision to join George W. De Long on his expedition, believing that it was his duty. Ambler prepared with studies of previous expeditions, consulted specialists at the Smithsonian Institution, and made visits to the Johns Hopkins University.

Ambler made his way to San Francisco where he launched with the USS Jeannette onto the expedition on July 8, 1879. He maintained a positive attitude, being eager to preserve the crew's health. The ship became ice-bound on September 6, 1879. Ambler rationed the lime juice to prevent scurvy and performed monthly checkups on the crew including giving psychological treatments for the sick and depressed crew. In his journal, Ambler stated that he suggested doing an eye surgery of John W. Danenhower, due to a possibility of losing it, to which he agreed. After Ambler discovered that some of the crew had gotten lead poisoning due to the canned tomatoes, he treated them for stomach cramps and relating symptoms.

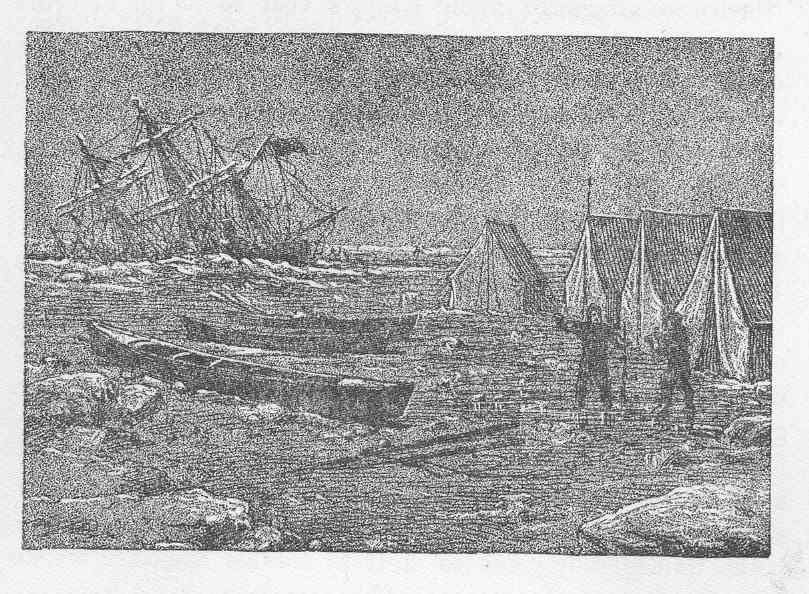
Sinking of the Jeannette

The ship sank on June 13, 1881, (Note: Sources disagree on the exact date of ship's sinking. Herman says June 11, Huggard 2000 says June 12, while Kelly & Burrage says June 13.) Ambler looked after the sick crew while on the 300 miles (480 kilometers) journey across an ice-covered landscape, with the goal of finding open sea. He wrote of his condition in the journal: "sleeping in wet clothes in a wet bag on wet ice makes every bone & separate muscle ache". After discovering open sea near the end of August 1881, the crew, while split up into three boats, got hit by a gale causing their boat to drift apart from George W. Melville's whaleboat, and Charles W. Chipp's cutter to sink, with Ambler being aboard De Long's cutter.

On October 8, 1881, after the food supplies were exhausted, De Long gave Ambler the decision to either stay or depart with the two strongest crewmen who eventually reached safety and passed command on to him. Ambler stated that "no one should leave him as long as I was alive", and stayed providing medical attention to the remaining crew. On October 20, 1881, Ambler made his final entry into his journal, stating "I have now, myself, very little hope of surviving … . I … bow my head in submission to the Divine Will." The last entry in the journal of De Long was on October 30, in which he mentioned the death of several men, but specified that Ambler was alive. Ambler is presumed to have died on or after that date; he was one of the last three members of the group to succumb to hunger and exposure. On March 23, 1882, Melville discovered the frozen bodies of the men. On February 20, 1884, Ambler's body returned to Markham. He was buried at the Leeds Episcopal Church.

In his book In the Lena Delta (1885), Melville wrote of Ambler that he "proved himself a skilled physician, an excellent officer and a noble man." The author Christopher J. Huggard wrote that Ambler's efforts made Jeannette the first arctic expedition "without a single case of scurvy".

== Works cited ==
- Ambler, Louise (1914). The Private Journal of James Markham Ambler, M.D. United States Government Publishing Office. pp. 1–99.
- Bergstrom, Peter V. "Richard Ambler (1690–ca. 1766)". Encyclopedia Virginia. Virginia Humanities.
- Herman, Jan K. "James M. Ambler (1848–1881)". Encyclopedia Virginia. Virginia Humanities.
- Huggard, Christopher J. (2000) [1999]. "Ambler, James Markham Marshall (1848-1881), naval surgeon and explorer". Ambler, James Markham Marshall. American National Biography. Oxford University Press. doi:10.1093/anb/9780198606697.article.2000022. ISBN 978-0-19-860669-7.
- Kelly, Howard A.; Burrage, Walter L. (eds.). "Ambler, James Markham Marshall" . American Medical Biographies . Baltimore: The Norman, Remington Company.
- Mayer, Frank W. (1997). "Frozen landscape". The Virginia Magazine of History and Biography. 27 (105). Virginia Historical Society: 5–6. ISSN 0042-6636.
- "Passed Assistant Surgeon, USN, (1848–1881)". Naval History and Heritage Command. Archived from the original on September 13, 2019.
- Pecquet du Bellet, Louise (1907). Some prominent Virginia families. Lynchburg: J.P. Bell Company. pp. 134–144. ISBN 978-1-29674-071-9.
- Rafa, Cheryl (November 1987). "The Ambler Family in Virginia". National Park Service.
- Sides, H. (2014). In the Kingdom of Ice: the grand and terrible polar voyage of the USS Jeannette. Oneworld. ISBN 978-1-78074-521-3.
