= John W. Danenhower =

United States naval officer

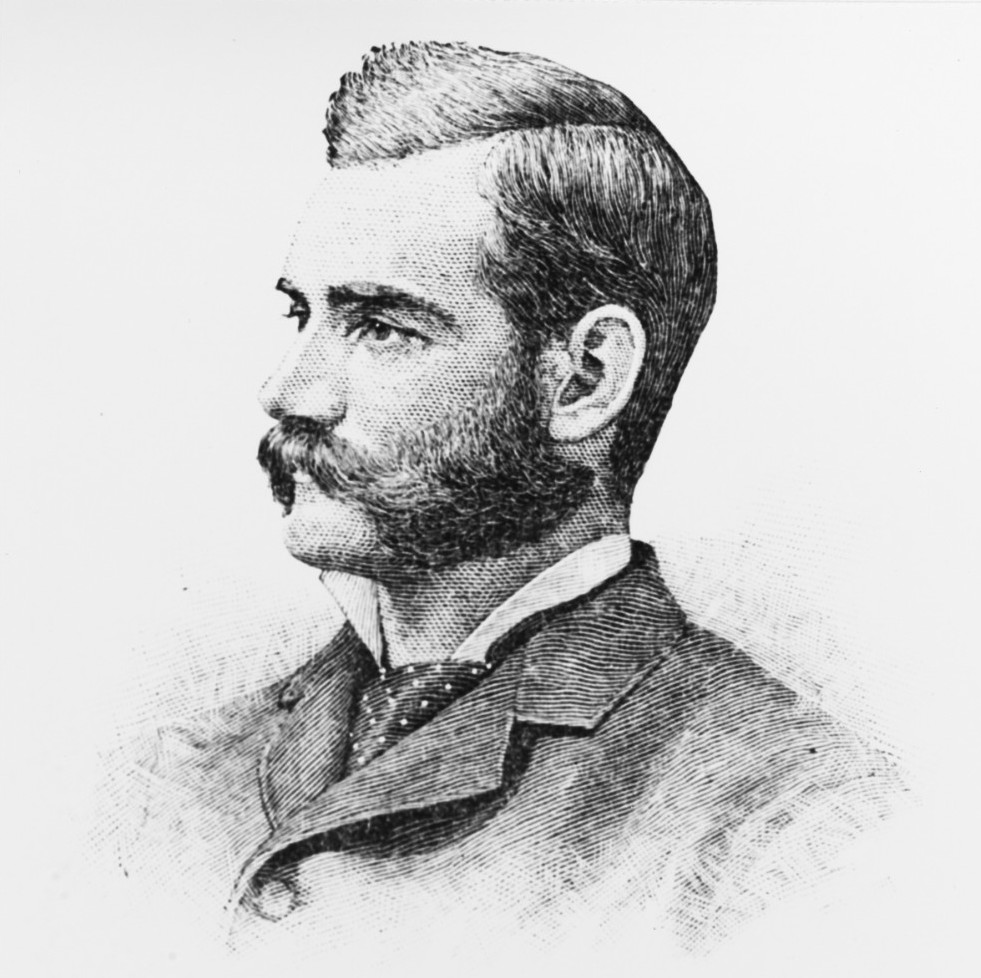
- Born: John Wilson Danenhower; September 30, 1849; Chicago, Illinois, U.S.
- Died: April 20, 1887 (aged 37); Annapolis, Maryland, U.S.
- Relatives: Sloan Wilson (grandson)
- Military career
- Branch: United States Navy
- Years of service: 1870–1887
- Rank: Lieutenant
- Expeditions: Jeannette expedition
- Awards: Gold Jeannette Medal (1890)

John Wilson Danenhower (September 30, 1849 – April 20, 1887) was a United States Navy officer best known for his participation in the Jeannette expedition.

== Early life ==
Born in Chicago, Danenhower attended local public schools, then accepted appointment to the United States Naval Academy in 1866. After his 1870 graduation, he served in the European Squadron aboard both the USS Plymouth and the USS Juniata.

Following this, he was assigned to the Portsmouth surveying party in the North Pacific. In 1875, he was assigned to the U.S. Naval Observatory where he attained the rank of master and then lieutenant in 1879. A year prior to this, he was committed to a psychiatric hospital for two months for signs of an unbalanced mind, but sufficiently recovered to return to active duty aboard the USS Vandalia in the Mediterranean Sea, attached to General Ulysses S. Grant's cruise.

== Jeannette expedition ==
From Smyrna, his petitioned services in the Arctic Jeannette expedition—officially called the United States Arctic Expedition—were accepted and he soon joined Captain George W. De Long at Le Havre, prior to sailing on to the Mare Island Navy Yard, near San Francisco. Here, the USS Jeannette was prepared and provisioned for the Arctic by Danenhower and Lieutenant Charles W. Chipp. The ship set sail for the Bering Strait on July 8, 1879. En route, Captain De Long, in a letter to his wife, Emma, praised Danenhower's work ethic.

Danenhower began a school of navigation for the crew while the Jeannette was wedged in an ice pack. Unfortunately, he was ineffective to the expedition and rendered unfit for duty on December 22, 1879, due to a months-long and ever increasingly treatment-resistant eye inflammation caused by syphilis.

Then on June 12, 1881, the ship was crushed by ice. The team was forced to drag their boats and provisions over the ice towards the Siberian coastline. Danenhower, with one eye bandaged and one covered by a dark goggle, complained often about not being allowed to take command of a group of men or lead a task, seemingly oblivious to his incapacitation. De Long was ultimately forced to order him to ride in a sledge due to his failing eyesight and frequent stumbles into crevasses.

They finally found open water and set a course for the Siberian Lena River delta in three separate boats which became separated by gale winds on September 12, 1881. Danenhower's boat, under command of Chief Engineer George W. Melville, reached the eastern Lena River Delta five days later. The crew was rescued by friendly natives. Danenhower set sail for the United States and arrived on May 28, 1882. His published book, Lieutenant Danenhower's Narrative of the Jeannette, graphically describes his experiences.

== Later life and death ==
For a few years, in ill health, he served as the assistant commander for midshipman training at Annapolis. His health problems centered around his failing eyesight. He assumed command of the USS Constellation on April 11, 1887, at Norfolk, but upon the ship's grounding while leaving Hampton Roads harbor, he returned to the academy, disturbed. There, on April 20, 1887, brooding over this incident, he committed suicide.

== Family ==
He was survived by his wife, Helen Sloan Danenhower and two children, Lieutenant Commander Sloan Danenhower, commander of the Arctic exploration submarine Nautilus, and Ruth Danenhower Wilson, an author. Danenhower's grandson was writer Sloan Wilson, who wrote The Man in the Gray Flannel Suit and was captain of a U.S. Coast Guard ship in World War II. John Wilson Danenhower was buried at Riverside Cemetery in Oswego County, New York.
