= William F. C. Nindemann =

German-American arctic explorer

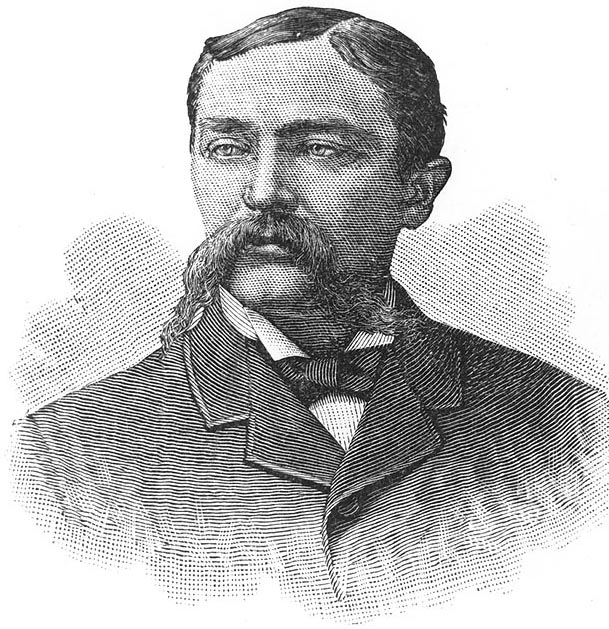
- Born: Wilhelm Friedrich Carl Nindemann; 22 April 1850; Gingst, Pomerania, Prussia
- Died: 6 May 1913 (aged 63); Hollis, New York, U.S.
- Military career
- Allegiance: United States
- Branch: United States Navy
- Service years: 1867–1902
- Expeditions: Polaris expedition; Jeannette expedition
- Awards: Silver Jeannette Medal (1890)

William Frederick Carl Nindemann (April 22, 1850 – May 6, 1913) was a German-born American Arctic explorer and recipient of the Congressional Silver Jeannette Medal.

== Biography ==
William Nindemann was born on April 22, 1850, in Gingst, on Rügen – Germany's biggest island, then part of the Province of Pomerania in the Kingdom of Prussia. He graduated in 1865 and moved to New York in 1867, where he served as a quartermaster on a yacht.

=== Polaris expedition ===
He joined the Polaris expedition, which sailed from New London, Connecticut on July 3, 1871. On October 15, 1872, the USS Polaris–leaking badly—crew was ordered to land provisions; while thus engaged the floe broke, and Nindemann with eighteen others drifted southward for 196 days without seeing the ship again. Nindemann and the others were rescued by the USS Tigress on April 29, 1873. After returning to Washington, Nindemann volunteered on the Tigress in her search for the Polaris.

=== Jeannette expedition ===
In 1879, he joined the crew of the Jeannette expedition to reach the North Pole. After the USS Jeannette sank in the ice and the party made it to the Lena Delta on the northern coast of Siberia, on October 9, 1881, Captain George W. De Long sent the two strongest members, Nindemann and Louis P. Noros to find aid for the starving crew. Taking a southern course, they wandered until October 21, when they were met by a native, who took them to Kumak Surka, where they sent a message through a Russian exile to George W. Melville—Jeannette's chief engineer—who afterward joined them at Bulun. Subsequently, Melville, James H. Bartlett, and Nindemann explored the delta for traces of De Long's party, and on March 15, 1882, they found the bodies of De Long and his companions.

=== Later life ===
In 1890, Nindemann was awarded a Congressional Gold Medal for his feats of heroism and endurance during the Jeannette expedition. During the Russo-Japanese War, he took several submarines to Japan for the Holland Submarine Boat Company. He served in the Spanish–American War. Nindemann invented a tong for the gaff of fore-and-aft rigged vessels, which was patented in 1883, and was the author of an 1885 pamphlet entitled A German Sailor's Journey to the North Pole, edited by Karl Knortz.

William Nindemann died on May 6, 1913, in Hollis, New York.
