= Jeannette Medal =

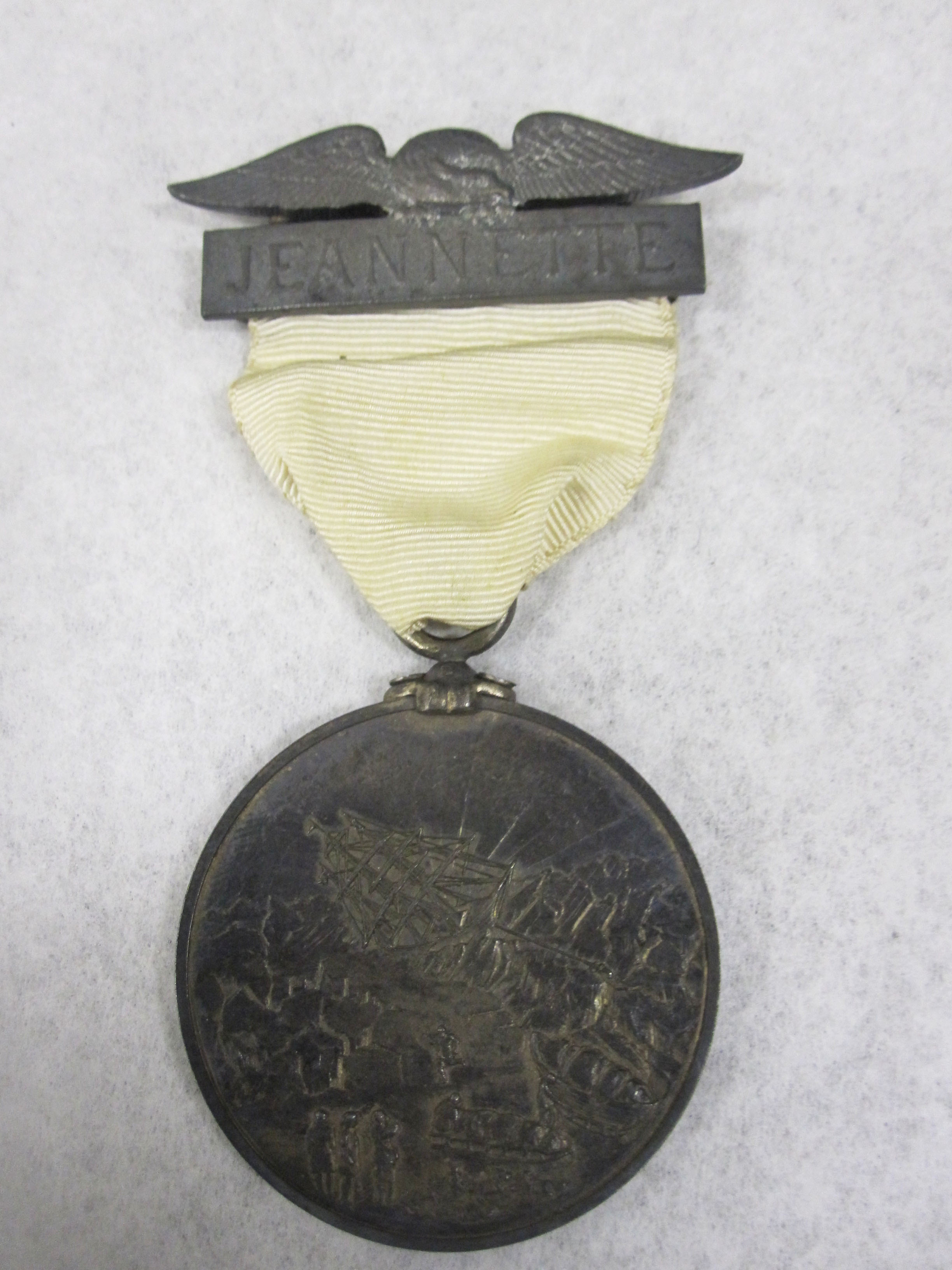
- Silver Medal
- Type: Congressional Gold Medal
- Awarded for: "... in recognition of the merits and services of [...] officers and men of the Jeannette Arctic Expedition."
- Country: United States
- Presented by: Secretary of the Navy
- Eligibility: Jeannette expedition personnel
- Status: One-time award
- Established: September 30, 1890; 135 years ago
- Total: 8 gold medals, 25 silver medals

The Jeannette Medal is a Congressional Gold Medal awarded in 1890, to officers and crew of the Jeannette expedition. Eight gold and twenty-five silver medals were struck, resulting in all thirty-three members of the crew receiving a medal. Twenty of the crew died during the expedition.

== Statute ==
"Be it enacted by the Senate and House of Representatives of the United States of America in Congress assembled, That the President be, and hereby is, authorized, by and with the advice and consent of the Senate, to advance Chief Engineer George Wallace Melville, United States Navy, one grade, to take rank from the same date but next after the junior chief engineer having the relative rank of commander at the passage of this act, as a recognition of his meritorious services in successfully directing the party under his command after the wreck of the Arctic exploring steamer Jeannette, and of his persistent efforts through dangers and hardships to find and assist his commanding officer and other members of the expedition before he himself was out of peril; and that he be allowed the pay of a chief engineer as if he had been commissioned on the same date as the junior chief engineer having the relative rank of commander at the passage of this act; such increased rate of pay to begin from the date of the passage of this act."

"That the said Melville shall hereafter continue to be next junior to the junior chief engineer having the relative rank of commander at the passage of this act; and whatever grade he may hereafter occupy shall be increased by one number, but the total number of chief engineers shall not be increased: Provided, That nothing in this act shall cause any officer to be retarded in his promotion or receive a less rate of pay than would otherwise have been the case."

"That suitable medals be struck at the United States Mint in commemoration of the perils encountered by the officers and men of the said Jeannette Arctic Expedition, and as an expression of the high esteem in which Congress holds their services in the said expedition; and that one of the said medals be presented to each of the survivors of said expedition, and one to the heirs of each of the deceased members."

"That a sufficient sum for the purposes of this act is hereby appropriated out of any money in the Treasury not otherwise appropriated."

== Recipients ==
A total of eight gold and twenty-five silver medals were struck, in decoration form and distributed as follows:

=== Gold Medal ===
- James M. Ambler^{†} – presented to his brother, Richard C. Ambler
- Charles W. Chipp^{†} – presented to his father, Warren Chipp
- Jerome J. Collins^{†} – presented to his brother, Daniel F. Collins
- John W. Danenhower^{†} – presented to his wife, Helen Sloan Danenhower
- George W. De Long^{†} – presented to his wife, Emma W. De Long
- William M. Dunbar^{†} – presented to the administrator of his estate
- George W. Melville – collected in person
- Raymond L. Newcomb – collected in person

=== Silver Medal ===
- Alexy^{†}
- Aneguin^{†}
- James H. Bartlett
- George W. Boyd^{†}
- John Cole^{†}
- Adolph Dressler^{†}
- Hans H. Erickson
- Carl A. Görtz
- Nelse Iverson
- Peter E. Johnson^{†}
- Heinrich H. Kaack
- Albert G. Kuehne
- George Lauterbach
- Herbert W. Leach
- Walter Lee
- Frank E. Mansen
- William F. C. Nindemann
- Louis P. Noros
- Ah Sam^{†}
- Walter Sharvell^{†}
- Charles T. Sing
- Edward Starr^{†}
- Alfred Sweetman^{†}
- Henry D. Warren
- Henry Wilson

== Sources ==
- "Session I. Chapter 1128." (PDF). The Statutes at Large of the United States of America. Vol. 26. Washington: GPO. 30 September 1890. pp. 552–553.
