= Bykovsky, Sakha Republic =

Bykovsky Быковский
- Selo

Other transcription(s)
  - Yakut: Быковскай
- Interactive map of Bykovsky
- Location of Bykovsky Bykovsky (Sakha Republic)
- Coordinates: 72°00′16″N 129°06′34″E
- Country: Russia
- Federal subject: Sakha Republic
- Administrative district: Bulunsky District
- Rural okrugSelsoviet: Bykovsky Rural Okrug

Population (2010 Census)
  - Total: 517
  - Estimate (January 2016): 514 (−0.6%)

Administrative status
  - Capital of: Bykovsky Rural Okrug

Municipal status
  - Municipal district: Bulunsky Municipal District
  - Rural settlement: Bykovsky Rural Settlement
  - Capital of: Bykovsky Rural Settlement
- Time zone: UTC+
- Postal code: 678412
- OKTMO ID: 98612413101

Bykovsky (also spelled Bykovskiy; Russian: Быковский; Yakut: Быковскай, romanized: Bıkovskay) is a rural locality (a selo), the only inhabited locality, and the administrative center of Bykovsky Rural Okrug of Bulunsky District in the Sakha Republic, Russia, located 80 kilometers (50 mi) from Tiksi, the administrative center of the district. Its population as of the 2010 Census was 517, up from 363 recorded during the 2002 Census.

Sakha people from around Bykovsky were among those who helped save some of George W. De Long's USS Jeannette survivors in 1881, though De Long himself died of starvation before reaching Bykovsky.

There is a memorial erected in 1989 for Finnish and Lithuanian deportees in Bykovsky. There was a high mortality rate among the deportees in 1942 and 1943. An inscription was set up in the village in Lithuanian, Russian, Sakha, and Finnish reading "Forcibly torn from their native land, fallen but not forgotten."
