= Jeannette expedition =

Failed 1879–81 American Arctic expedition

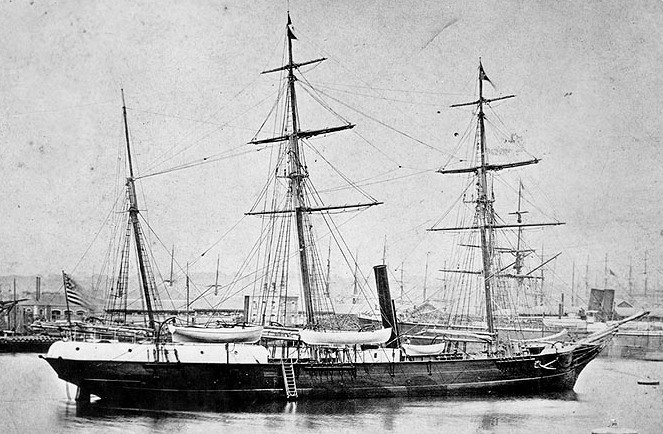
Jeannette at Le Havre in 1878, prior to her departure for San Francisco in a trip that would see her round Cape Horn

The Jeannette expedition of 1879–1881, officially called the U.S. Arctic Expedition, was an attempt led by George W. De Long to reach the North Pole by pioneering a route from the Pacific Ocean through the Bering Strait. The premise was that a temperate current, the Kuro Siwo, flowed northwards into the strait, providing a gateway to the hypothesized Open Polar Sea and thus to the pole.

This theory proved illusory; the expedition's ship, USS Jeannette and its crew of thirty-three men, was trapped by ice and drifted for nearly two years before she was crushed and sunk north of the Siberian coast. De Long then led his men on a perilous journey by sled, dragging the Jeannette's whaleboat and two cutters, eventually switching to these small boats to sail for the Lena Delta in Siberia. During this journey, and in the subsequent weeks of wandering in Siberia before rescue, twenty of the ship's complement died, including De Long.

The chief exponent of the theory of a warm-water gateway to the North Pole was the German cartographer August Petermann. He encouraged James Gordon Bennett Jr., the proprietor of The New York Herald, to finance a polar expedition based on the untried Pacific route. Bennett acquired a former Royal Navy gunboat, Pandora, and changed her name to Jeannette. De Long, whom Bennett chose to lead the expedition, was a serving United States Navy officer with previous Arctic experience. Although essentially a private venture, in which Bennett paid all the bills, the expedition had the full support of the U.S. government. Before departure the ship was commissioned into the U.S. Navy as USS Jeannette, and sailed under navy laws and discipline.

Before its demise, the expedition discovered new islands—the De Long Islands—and collected valuable meteorological and oceanographic data. Although Jeannette's fate demolished the widely believed Open Polar Sea theory, the appearance in 1884 of debris from the wreck on the south-west coast of Greenland indicated the existence of an ocean current moving the permanent Arctic ice from east to west. This discovery inspired Fridtjof Nansen to mount his Fram expedition nine years later. A monument to the Jeannette's dead was erected at the United States Naval Academy in Annapolis, Maryland, in 1890.

== Background ==
=== Early Arctic exploration ===
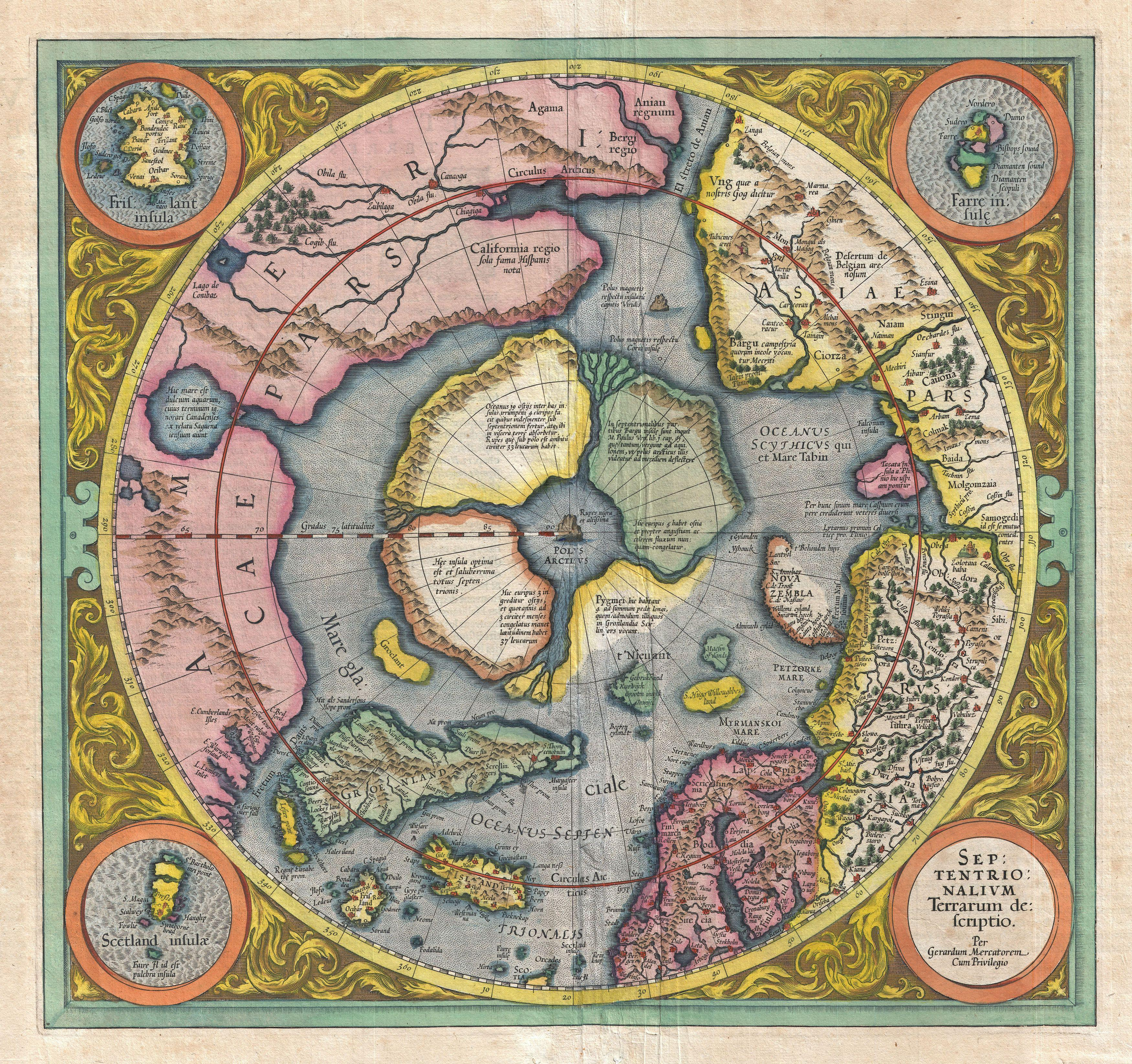
The North Pole by Gerardus Mercator shows the pole within an "Open Polar Sea" in 1606

European exploration of the Arctic regions began in the 16th century, with searches for new routes to the Pacific via the Northeast and Northwest passages. The English sea explorer Henry Hudson, namesake of the Hudson River, is presumed to have died in Hudson Bay in 1611 while trying to find the Northwest Passage. The possibility of a third route, directly across the North Pole, was raised by early geographer Richard Hakluyt. The early explorers had little success in finding these routes, but made important geographical discoveries. In time, the search for trade routes became secondary to the prestige objective of reaching the North Pole itself, or at least of registering a "Farthest North". In 1773, a British naval expedition under captain Constantine Phipps sought a route to the pole from the Seven Islands, but found the way impassably blocked by ice. On May 28, 1806, whaling captain William Scoresby achieved a new record northern latitude of 81°30' to the north of Svalbard before being stopped by ice.

The prevalent theory of polar geography throughout this period was that of a temperate "Open Polar Sea" surrounding the North Pole. The observable southward drift of Arctic ice was thought to result from the "pushing" effect of this warmer water. According to the historian Hampton Sides, despite the lack of scientific evidence the theory "gathered a logic of its own ... No amount of contrary evidence could dislodge it from the collective imagination". The fact that all northbound voyages had, sooner or later, been stopped by ice was rationalized through a belief that the undiscovered sea was encircled in a ring or "annulus" of ice which, it was thought, could be penetrated via one of several warm-water gateways or portals. The initial quest for the North Pole thus became a search for one of these portals.

After British naval expeditions in 1818 and 1827–1828 had probed north of Spitsbergen and found no sign of the supposed polar sea, the quest was in abeyance for twenty-five years. In the 1850s, the search for the lost Franklin expedition generated a rash of incursions into the Canadian Arctic. From these forays, particularly that of Edward Augustus Inglefield in 1852, emerged the theory that Smith Sound, a northerly channel between Greenland and Ellesmere Island, was one of the fabled gateways to the polar sea. This brought a succession of expeditions to this area: Elisha Kane in 1853–1855, Isaac Israel Hayes in 1860–1861, Charles Francis Hall in 1872–1874, and George Nares in 1875–1876. No gateway was found, although both Kane and Hayes claimed, mistakenly, to have seen the Open Polar Sea from a distance.

=== August Petermann ===
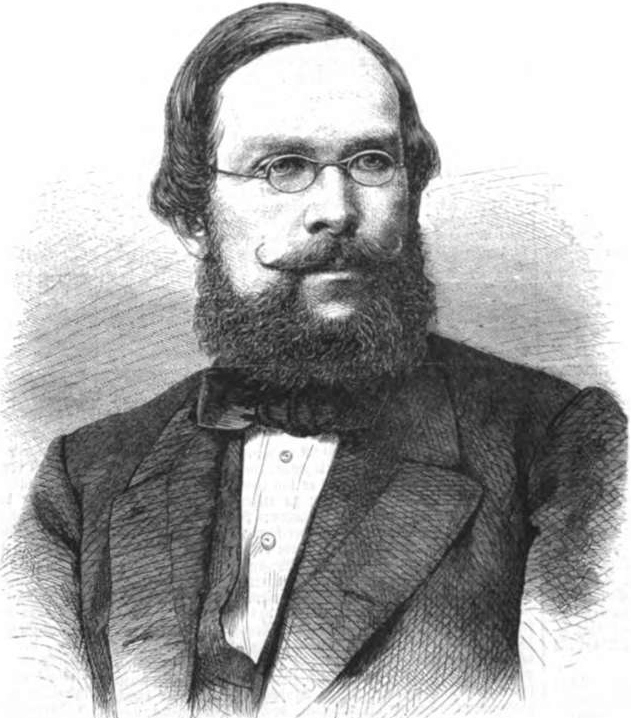
August Petermann

The Smith Sound route was not favored by everyone; among those who rejected it was leading cartographer August Petermann from Germany, widely known as the "Sage of Gotha." A firm believer in the Open Polar Sea theory, Petermann believed that the most likely portal would be found by following the Gulf Stream, which swept up the coast of Norway to the unexplored Arctic regions. He thought the current would weaken or even penetrate the protective ice ring, and that a sturdily-built steamer following the course of the stream might thus be able to break through into the supposed polar sea.

After two expeditions sponsored by Petermann—the German North Polar Expedition of 1869 led by Carl Koldewey, and the Austro-Hungarian North Pole Expedition of 1872 under Karl Weyprecht and Julius von Payer—had followed separate branches of the Gulf Stream but ultimately failed to break through the ice, Petermann grew dispirited. In the year before he took his own life in 1878 he transferred his advocacy to the Kuro Siwo, a Pacific Ocean current analyzed in the 1850s by the hydrographer Silas Bent. Petermann followed Bent in believing that a branch of the Kuro Siwo flowed through the Bering Strait and might be powerful enough to create a path to the polar sea. At the time no one had attempted to reach the polar sea by this route.

=== George W. De Long ===
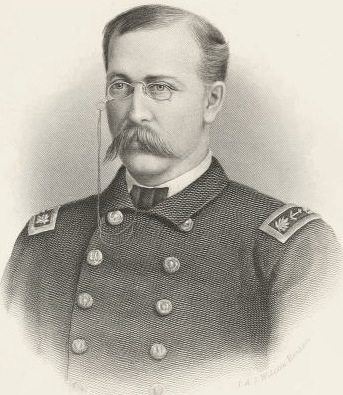
George W. De Long

In July 1873, the United States Navy dispatched USS Juniata to Greenland, to search for survivors from the Polaris expedition, which had disintegrated after the death of its leader, Charles Francis Hall. Juniata's second-in-command was George W. De Long, a 28-year-old graduate of the United States Naval Academy, making his first visit to the Arctic. Ice conditions prevented Juniata from advancing beyond Upernavik; De Long volunteered to take the ship's tender, a small steamer named Little Juniata, in the hope of finding survivors at Cape York, a further 400 nautical miles (740 km) north.

The attempt failed; Little Juniata faced extreme weather conditions and was forced to retreat a few miles from Cape York. De Long returned to Juniata in mid-August, having found no trace of the Polaris crew—who had meanwhile been rescued by the Scottish whaler SS Ravenscraig—but the experience had profoundly affected his outlook. Having earlier described the Greenland coast in a letter to his wife Emma as "a dreary land of desolation ... I hope I may never find myself cast away in such a perfectly God-forsaken place," he returned home captivated by the Arctic. Emma wrote: "The polar virus was in his blood and would not let him rest".

The abortive Little Juniata mission brought De Long to public notice, and he saw himself as a possible leader of the next U.S. Arctic expedition. He approached Henry Grinnell, a philanthropic shipping magnate who had funded several previous expeditions. Grinnell was not prepared to offer financial support, instead advising De Long to approach James Gordon Bennett Jr., owner and publisher of The New York Herald and a known sponsor of bold schemes. De Long met Bennett in New York City early in 1874; the newspaperman was impressed by De Long, and assured him that his Arctic ambitions would have the enthusiastic support of the Herald. In the meantime De Long had applied to the U.S. Department of the Navy for an Arctic command, a request that he was informed would "receive due attention."

=== James Gordon Bennett Jr. ===
James Gordon Bennett Jr. had succeeded his father as proprietor of the Herald in 1866. He had won renown in 1872, when his reporter Henry Morton Stanley, sent by Bennett to Africa in search of the British missionary-explorer David Livingstone, cabled that Livingstone had been found. Bennett knew the news value of Arctic exploration; two Herald reporters had accompanied Juniata, and in 1874 Bennett was helping to fund British sailor Allen Young and his decommissioned former gunboat Pandora, on one of the final Franklin searches.

Bennett was interested in Petermann's theories, and in 1877 traveled to Gotha to discuss possible Arctic routes with the geographer. Petermann thought that as well as providing the best path to the pole, passage through the Bering Strait using the Kuro Siwo would enable investigation of the unexplored, barely glimpsed land mass known since 1867 as "Wrangel's Land". He theorized that this land formed part of a transpolar continent, connected to Greenland; if so, it might provide an alternative, land-based route to the pole should the expedition fail to find a portal to the polar sea. "My idea", he told Bennett, "is that if one door will not open, try another". He offered Bennett full use of his maps and charts.

Petermann's advice convinced Bennett that a new American polar venture should go ahead. On his return from Gotha, he cabled De Long requesting him to seek leave of absence from the Navy, and to begin the search for a ship suitable for Arctic exploration using Petermann's Bering Strait route.

== Preparation ==
=== Ship ===
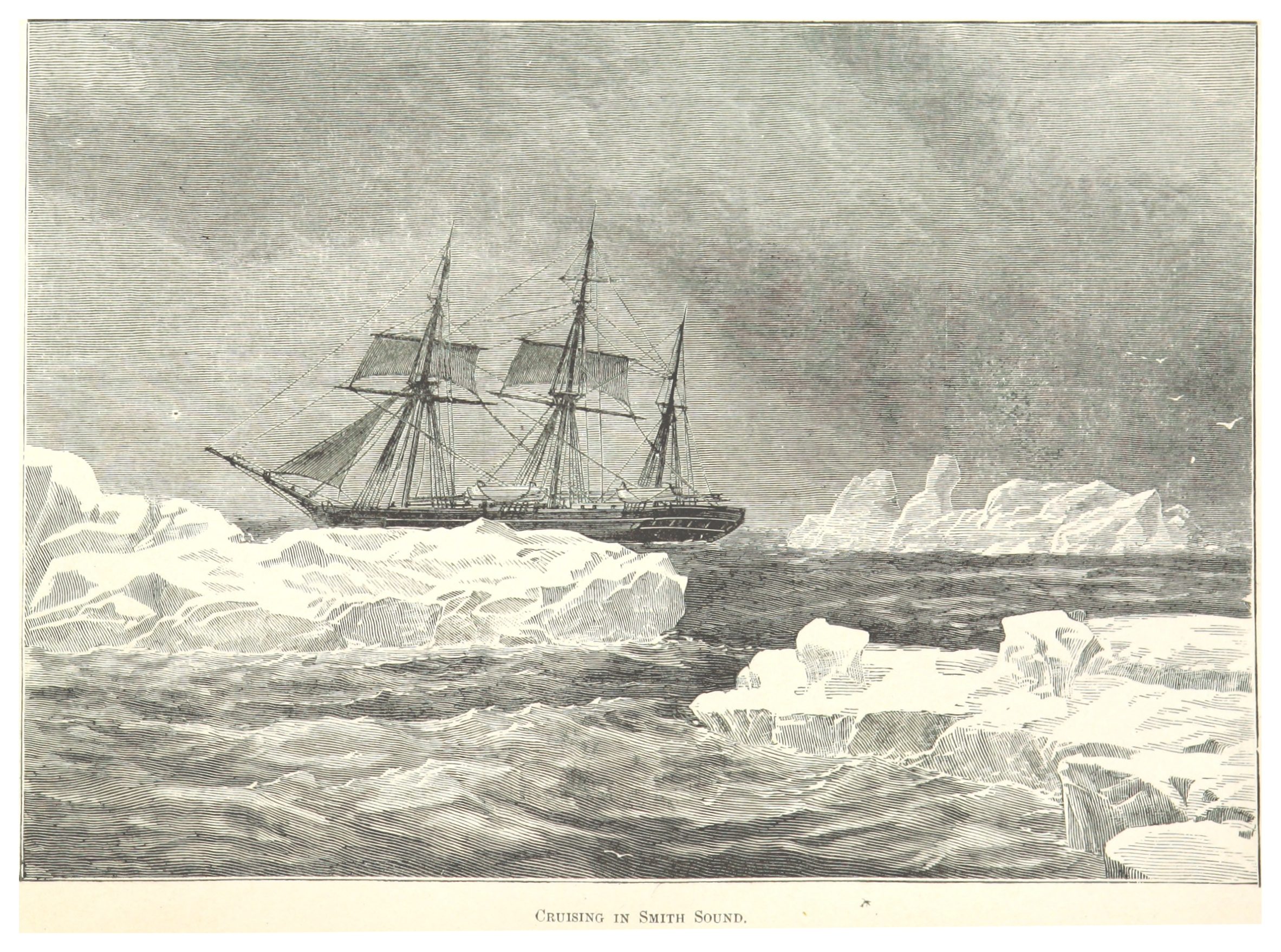
Pandora, cruising in Smith Sound during one of her Arctic voyages

As no suitable ship was available in the U.S., De Long went to England, where he found Young's Pandora on offer at $6,000. The vessel's Arctic pedigree made it seem ideal, but Young's hesitancy about selling delayed the purchase until late 1877. At Bennett's instigation, Congress passed legislation that gave the Navy Department full control over the expedition; it would fly the American flag and the crew would be engaged by the Navy and would be subject to naval discipline. Bennett remained responsible for financing the enterprise, and undertook to reimburse the government for all costs incurred. Meanwhile, De Long was released from active duty to oversee Pandora's refit in England.

In June 1878, after a thorough overhaul at Deptford on the Thames Estuary, Pandora sailed to Le Havre in France where, on July 4, she was renamed Jeannette, after Bennett's sister who performed the ceremony. On July 15, the ship, manned by De Long and a small crew, sailed from Le Havre to begin the 18,000-nautical-mile (33,000 km) voyage to San Francisco, the port from which the Arctic expedition was to sail. They arrived on December 27, 1878, and transferred Jeannette to Mare Island Naval Shipyard to undergo further work in readiness for a prolonged journey in the Arctic ice.

De Long spent much of the early part of 1879 in Washington, D.C., promoting the expedition among officials, searching for appropriate crew members, and harrying Navy Secretary Richard W. Thompson for practical support. His requests included the use of a supply ship to accompany Jeannette as far as Alaska. Among the less standard equipment acquired by De Long was an experimental arc lamp system devised by Thomas Edison which would supposedly provide light equivalent to 3,000 candles and thus transform the Arctic winter darkness. Having successfully undergone her sea trials on June 28, ten days before her scheduled departure, Jeannette was formally commissioned into the Navy as USS Jeannette.

=== Personnel ===
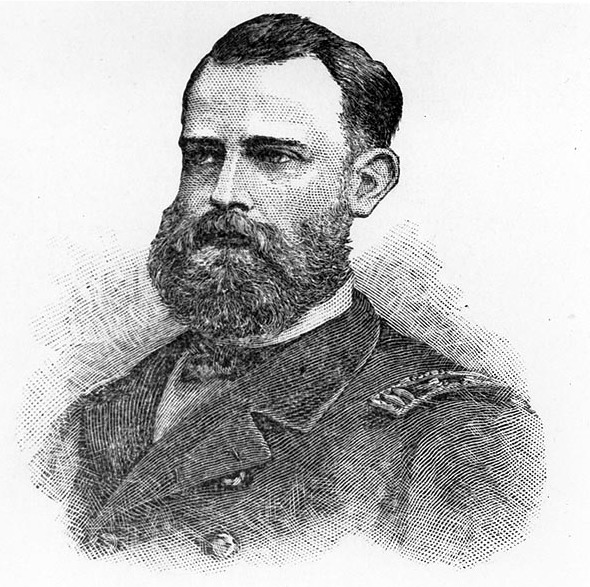
Charles W. Chipp

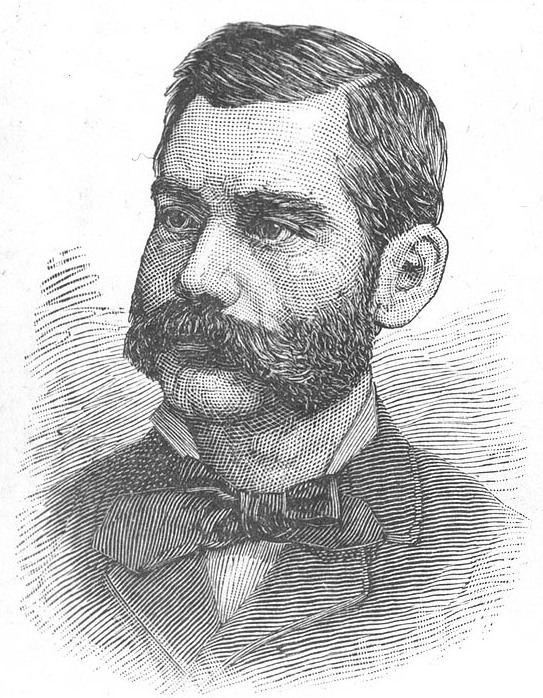
John W. Danenhower

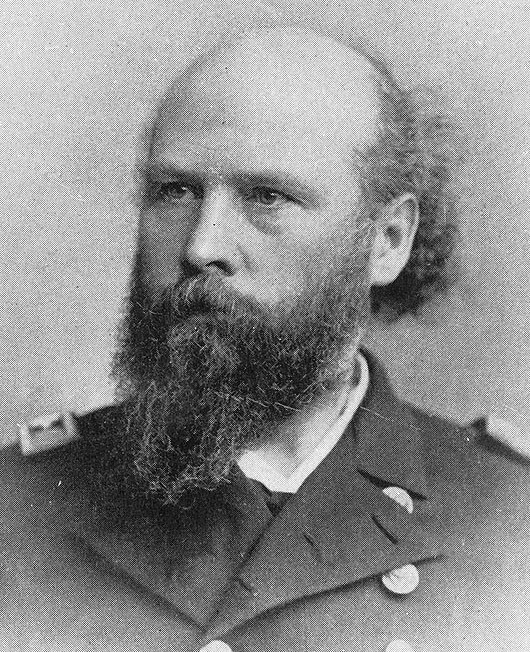
George W. Melville

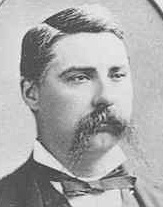
Jerome J. Collins

In selecting his crew, De Long's priority was men with Arctic experience. For his second-in-command he chose lieutenant Charles W. Chipp, who had served with him on the Little Juniata adventure. Another veteran of the Polaris rescue mission, George W. Melville, was appointed as ship's engineer. Other experienced Arctic hands were William F. C. Nindemann, a Polaris survivor, and the ice pilot William Dunbar, who had many years' experience in whalers.

The appointment of the expedition's navigating officer was problematic; John W. Danenhower, a young naval officer from a well-connected Washington family, was recommended to Bennett by former U.S. President Ulysses S. Grant. Such sponsorship won Danenhower his place, despite a history of depression that had seen him briefly incarcerated at the Government Hospital for the Insane. On Bennett's request, Danenhower accompanied De Long on the voyage from Le Havre to San Francisco, during which he confided details of his medical history. The navigator's competent performance persuaded De Long that such troubles were in the past.

The ship's surgeon, James Ambler, was assigned to the expedition by the Navy's Bureau of Medicine and Surgery, only because he was next on the list of medical officers available for sea duty. Ambler deduced from Danenhower's medical records that a probable cause of the navigator's medical lapses was syphilis, but Danenhower's influential connections ensured that he kept his place on the expedition.

Two others from Jeannette's voyage from Le Havre, carpenter Albert Sweetman and boatswain John Cole, were enlisted, as was the Herald's meteorologist, Jerome Collins. Dubbed "chief scientist," he was in charge of the Edison apparatus and of a rudimentary telephone system that De Long hoped to utilize. The remaining places were filled from a long list of applicants; the cook and steward were recruited by Danenhower from San Francisco's Chinatown district.

==== Officers ====
- George W. De Long, USN – commanding officer
- Charles W. Chipp, USN – executive officer
- John W. Danenhower, USN – navigation officer
- George W. Melville, USN – engineer
- James M. Ambler, USN – surgeon
- William M. Dunbar – ice pilot
- Jerome J. Collins – meteorologist
- Raymond L. Newcomb – naturalist

==== Crew ====
- John Cole – boatswain
- Walter Lee – machinist
- James H. Bartlett – fireman
- George W. Boyd – fireman
- Alfred Sweetman – carpenter
- Ah Sam – cook, steward
- Charles T. Sing – cook, steward
- Alexey – hunter
- Aneguin – hunter

==== Seamen ====
- Adolph Dressler
- Hans H. Erickson
- Carl A. Görtz
- Nelse Iverson
- Peter E. Johnson
- Heinrich H. Kaack
- Albert G. Kuehne
- George Lauterbach
- Herbert W. Leach
- Frank E. Mansen
- William F. C. Nindemann
- Louis P. Noros
- Walter Sharvell
- Edward Starr
- Henry D. Warren
- Henry Wilson

=== Problems ===
De Long quickly found himself at odds with the naval engineers at Mare Island, whose estimates of the work required to prepare Jeannette for the Arctic greatly exceeded his own judgement of what was necessary. De Long spent much time negotiating on Bennett's behalf with the Navy Department in an effort to reduce costs. In this he was broadly successful, but in other areas he faced setbacks. In April he learned that the Navy was unable to provide a supply ship to accompany Jeannette northward, a decision which, he thought, left the fate of the expedition "hanging by a thread." Bennett eventually resolved this difficulty by chartering a schooner, the Frances Hyde, to carry extra coal and provisions as far as Alaska.

Late in his preparations, De Long received orders from Secretary Thompson that, before proceeding with his own Arctic mission he should enquire along the Siberian coast for news of Adolf Erik Nordenskiöld and his ship Vega. The Swedish explorer was currently attempting the first navigation of the Northeast Passage; he was not overdue, and there was no evidence that he was in difficulty. Nevertheless, Bennett sensed the opportunity for a rescue story to equal his Stanley-Livingstone scoop, and persuaded Thompson to issue the order. De Long, unaware that his patron was the originator, protested that this requirement would jeopardize his primary mission, but was forced to modify his plans.

De Long was unaware, as he prepared to sail, that the United States Coast and Geodetic Survey was studying the latest hydrographical and meteorological data obtained from its research ships in the Bering Sea. The material indicated conclusively that, contrary to Bent's theories, the Kuro Siwo had no perceptible effect on the areas north of the Bering Strait. The survey's report went on to dismiss the entire concept of "gateways" and a warm polar sea. By the time these conclusions were published, Jeannette had sailed, and De Long remained in ignorance of this information.

== Voyage ==
=== Toward the Arctic ===
Jeannette's departure from San Francisco, on July 8, 1879, was a popular spectacle, witnessed by large crowds who came from all quarters of the city. The army at Fort Point provided an eleven-gun salute; in contrast, De Long noted that none of the naval vessels in and around San Francisco made any formal acknowledgement of their sister-ship's departure, "[not even] the blast of a steam whistle." Bennett, absent in Europe, cabled that he hoped to be present when Jeannette made its triumphant return. (Note: Bennett had lived for many years in Paris and rarely visited his home country. He had promised De Long that he would attend the launch on the condition that he could arrive incognito—an impossibility for so well known a figure. Nevertheless his non-arrival was a keen disappointment to De Long.)

The first weeks on the journey northwards were uneventful. On August 3, Jeannette reached Unalaska in the Aleutian Islands where De Long sought information on Nordenskiöld from the crew of a revenue cutter newly returned from the Bering Strait. The cutter had no news of him. On August 12, Jeannette reached St. Michael, a small port on the Alaskan mainland, and waited for Francis Hyde to arrive with extra provisions and coal.

At St. Michael, De Long hired two experienced Inuit dog drivers, and took on board sled dogs. On August 21, after transferring provisions and fuel, Francis Hyde departed; Jeannette set out for the Chukchi Peninsula on the Siberian coast, to enquire after Nordenskiöld. (Note: Nordenskiöld had left Sweden on July 4, 1878, and followed the Siberian coastline eastwards from Finland. He wintered in the ice at around longitude 180°, and managed to send a message overland to Yakutsk, notifying his position. In early 1879 he completed the Northwest Passage; on August 21, as De Long left St. Michael to look for him, Vega was well to the south, heading for Yokohama in Japan.) At Saint Lawrence Bay the Chukchi people reported that an unidentified steamer had recently passed by, going south. De Long then headed through the Bering Strait towards Cape Dezhnev, where he learned from locals that a ship had called at Cape Serdtse-Kamen, further along the coast. Here, a shore party from Jeannette quickly established from artifacts left behind with villagers that this ship was Vega and that Nordenskiöld's expedition had therefore safely completed the Northeast Passage. De Long left a note of his findings for transmission to Washington.

On August 31, Jeannette left, in the assumed direction of Wrangel's Land, where De Long hoped to establish his winter quarters.

=== Icebound ===
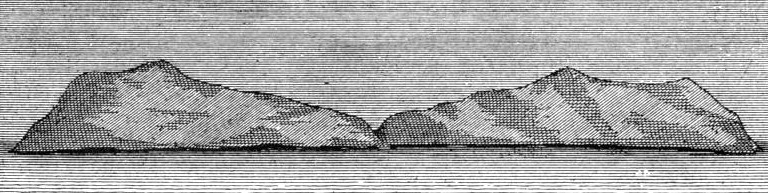
Herald Island, sketched in 1881 from the Corwin

Jeannette initially made good speed northward; on September 2 she was about 100 nautical miles (190 km; 120 mi) from the charted position of Wrangel's Land, but with ice thickening all around, movement became slow and erratic. On September 4, from the crow's nest, Dunbar sighted the known landmark of Herald Island, (Note: The island's name had no connection with Bennett's newspaper. It was given by a British whaling captain in 1849, after his ship.) but the ice now presented an almost insuperable obstacle to progress. De Long raised steam and repeatedly charged the pack, seeking to batter a way forward. The thick plume of smoke from Jeannette's stack, observed by whalers, was the final sighting of Jeannette by the outside world.

The next day, September 5, the crew caught a brief glimpse of Wrangel's Land—or perhaps, as De Long surmised, a mirage. Ice conditions now made it impossible to move closer to this tantalizing shore, and De Long made Herald Island his new objective. Shortly afterwards, Jeannette was sealed within the pack, "as tightly as a fly in amber" according to historian Leonard Guttridge.

Herald Island was still about 15 nautical miles (28 km; 17 mi) away; a sled party under Chipp set off across the ice to investigate the possibility of a winter harbor should Jeannette regain maneuverability. Chipp's party was unable to get closer to the island than six nautical miles (11 km) before the volatile ice conditions forced their return to the ship. De Long still hoped for a change in the weather that would release them from the ice, writing in his journal: "I am told that in the later part of September and early part of October there is experienced in these latitudes quite an Indian Summer". The following weeks brought no increase in temperature, and De Long reluctantly accepted that Jeannette was trapped for the winter.

=== Drifting ===
The initial direction of Jeannette's drift was haphazard, back and forth—on October 13, nearly a month after the ship was first trapped, Herald Island was still in sight. As October developed, the direction of drift shifted to the northwest, and it became apparent to De Long that "Wrangel's Land" was not after all a land mass, but was a relatively small island. At the same time, analyses of sea currents, salinity and temperature provided data confirming the Geodetic Survey's findings, by then known in Washington, that the Kuro Siwo had no effect north of the Bering Strait. The vista of endless ice surrounding the ship raised profound doubts about the entire concept of the Open Polar Sea. Amid the boredom of the largely eventless drift, the crew ate well; ship's stores were boosted by regular hunting parties which brought a harvest of seal and polar bear meat.

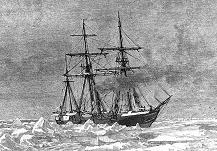
Jeannette trapped in the ice, off Herald Island

In late October, as winter approached, De Long ordered the Edison arc lighting system erected, but the generating mechanism failed to produce even the dimmest of lights and the apparatus was swiftly abandoned, along with the equally ineffective telephone system. Christmas 1879, and the start of the new year, were celebrated without great joy; De Long wrote of Christmas as "the dreariest day of my life, and it is certainly the dreariest part of the world".

On January 19, 1880, Jeannette's hull was breached by the ice and she began to take in water rapidly. De Long prepared to abandon ship, but she was saved by the actions of Nindemann and Sweetman, who waded into the freezing water in the hold and staunched the inflow by stuffing whatever materials were available into the breaches. Melville used elements of the discarded Edison apparatus to build a mechanical pumping system, and the problem was largely resolved by the construction of a new watertight bulkhead. De Long noted in his journal that the efforts of Nindemann and Sweetman were at least worthy of recommendation for the Medal of Honor.

For months on end Jeannette hardly moved at all; De Long recorded on March 2 that their position was almost precisely what it had been three months earlier. On May 5, the ship passed to the west of the 180° meridian, but two months later had retreated back to the other side of the line. The summer brought no relief; although it briefly seemed possible in August that Jeannette might break free and find open water, this proved a false hope. The condition of Danenhower was a further source of anxiety. His syphilis began to take toll of his body, particularly his left eye which, despite Ambler's repeated operations—stoically endured, given the lack of anesthetic—left the navigator largely incapacitated and unable to perform his duties. On the last day of 1880 De Long wrote in his journal: "I begin the new year by turning over a new leaf, and I hope to God we are turning over a new leaf in our book of luck".

=== Crushed ===
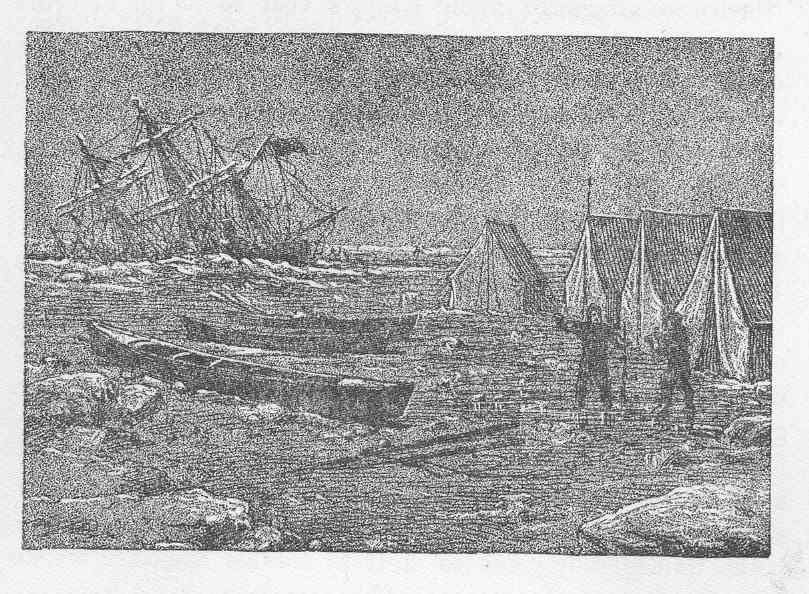
Sinking of the Jeannette

Early in 1881, De Long noted that after sixteen months, Jeannette was still only 220 nautical miles (410 km; 250 mi) from the point where she had been trapped. He wrote: "We are drifting about like a modern Flying Dutchman ... thirty-three people are wearing out their lives and souls". On May 16, an island was sighted, followed almost immediately by another—the first land seen for well over a year. "There is something then beside ice in the world!", wrote De Long. They were in uncharted seas, so these islands were discoveries. De Long named the first Henrietta Island, after Bennett's mother, and the second Jeannette Island. A sledge party under Melville was dispatched to Henrietta Island, to claim the territories for the United States.

At around this time, the USRC Thomas Corwin was in Alaskan waters, seeking news of De Long's expedition. Corwin's captain, Calvin Hooper, heard stories of a shipwreck in the far north and set off to investigate. For five weeks he circled the Bering Sea; encounters with locals convinced him that the wreck was not that of Jeannette. On June 16, another relief vessel, USS Rodgers, left San Francisco but was destroyed by fire in Saint Lawrence Bay in November.

On board Jeannette, the discovery of the islands had raised De Long's spirits—the expedition would, wherever the drift took it, have some concrete geographical achievement to its credit. The onset of the brief Arctic summer brought fresh hopes that Jeannette would at last be released from the ice, and on June 11, she was briefly free, afloat in a small pool. However, the next day the ice returned with renewed force, which battered the ship and finally penetrated the hull beyond repair. De Long supervised an orderly evacuation of men, dogs, equipment and provisions. In the early morning of June 13, 1881, Jeannette sank—her final recorded position being 77°15′N 155°0′E—around 300 nautical miles (560 km; 350 mi) off the Siberian coast.

=== Journey across the ice ===
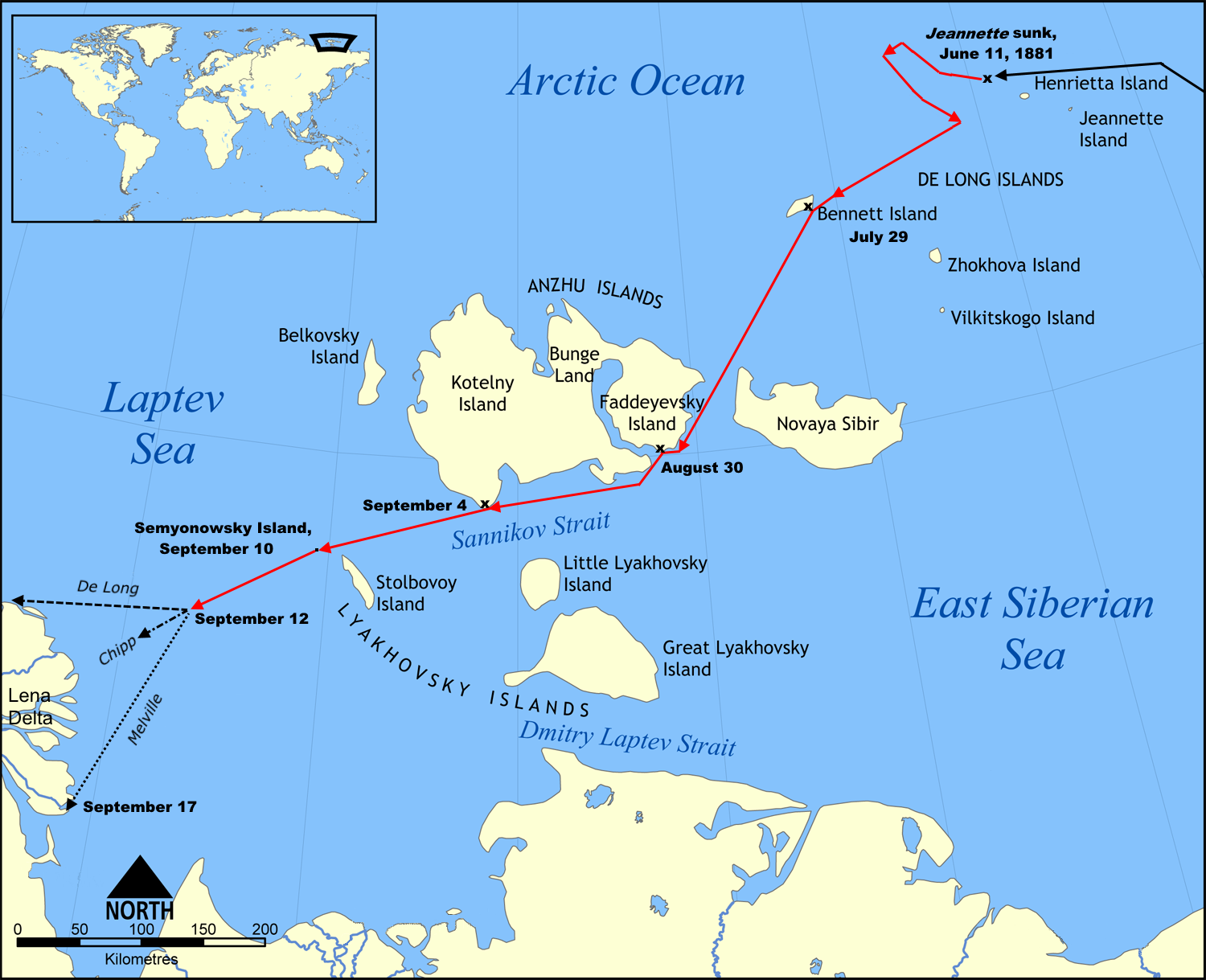
June 12 to September 17, 1881: Progress towards the coast of Siberia De Long, Chipp, and Melville's routes after separation

The entire crew of thirty-three men was still together. De Long's general plan was to march with dogs and sleds to the New Siberian Islands, somewhere to the south, and then use the boats to carry his party to the Siberian mainland. According to Petermann's maps his intended landfall, the Lena Delta, was studded with settlements that would provide them with shelter and safety. By June 25, after a week's hard traveling on the ice, the northward drift had nullified their progress; they were further from land than they had been when they set out.

When the direction of the ice shifted, the party was finally able to advance in the right direction, but the going was slow and difficult. Part of the problem lay with the dogs which, after nearly two years of relative idleness, were either lethargic or quarrelsome, unable to work in harness. Some of the worst offenders were shot for food.

On July 12, land appeared to the south; fleetingly, De Long thought this was part of the New Siberian Islands, but it was another uncharted island. When the party reached it on July 29, De Long named it Bennett Island, and called the point of landing "Cape Emma", after his wife. Meanwhile, hundreds of miles to the east, Corwin had given up on its rescue mission. After months of searching vainly for definite news or traces of Jeannette, Hooper had concluded that the vessel was lost and headed back to San Francisco.

After a week's rest, the party departed Bennett Island on August 6, leaving a message in a cairn. The ice was now too loose for sled travel, so the party transferred to the boats. Having no further use for the dogs, De Long ordered them shot. The general direction of the ice flow carried the party south-west, and on August 20 the most easterly of the New Siberian Islands, Novaya Sibir, was in sight. For the first time since moving away from Herald Island nearly two years previously, they were in the charted world.

De Long steered the boats through the channel between Novaya Sibir and Kotelny Island, before skirting the southern coast of Kotelny and beginning the final stage of the journey, across the open sea to the Lena Delta. Their last halt on September 10 was on the tiny Semyonovsky Island, fewer than 100 nautical miles (190 km; 120 mi) from the Siberian coast.

== Lena Delta ==
=== Storm and landfall ===
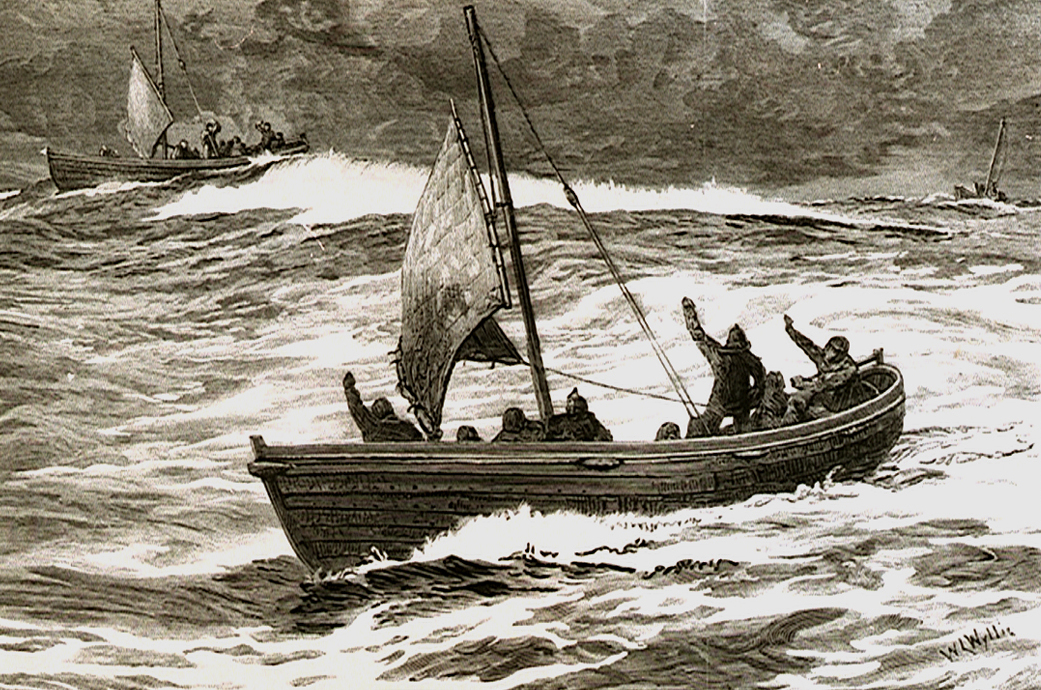
Separation of the boats in a gale

The entire crew were still together on Semyenovsky Island. The boats left the island early in the morning of September 12, in fair weather. Thirteen men were with De Long in the large cutter, Chipp with seven others took the smaller cutter, while Melville and ten men sailed in the whaleboat. Danenhower, who outranked Melville, complained bitterly to De Long about being placed under the engineer's command, but De Long replied that Danenhower was unfit for duty, a view confirmed by Ambler. De Long instructed that the boats should each aim for a point indicated as "Cape Barkin" on the Petermann map; if they became separated, and landed in different areas, the parties should rendezvous at Bulun, a sizeable settlement about 100 miles (160 km) from the coast.

The boats made good progress through the morning, and Melville initially thought they might strike land after a single night at sea. In the afternoon the weather worsened; the boats separated and lost sight of each other. De Long used a sea anchor to stabilize his craft in the ferocious seas and, despite having his sail torn away by the wind, managed to hold a course to the west. The storm had largely subsided by the morning of September 14, but progress was erratic in the absence of the sail, and it was three more days before the cutter ran aground at the most northerly limit of the Lena Delta. De Long and his crew waded ashore, carrying their provisions from the boat, and prepared for a long foot journey. Based on their map, the nearest settlement appeared to lie 95 miles (153 km) away. De Long thought their rations would last for three-and-a-half days.

In the whaleboat, Melville had, like De Long, ridden out the storm by means of a sea anchor. The boat's course was far to the south of De Long's; they finally reached land at one of the main mouths of the Lena, and were able to navigate upriver. Within a few days they encountered a native fishing camp, and by September 25 had reached the settlement of Arrhu. Chipp's cutter never reached land; overwhelmed by the storm, it presumably foundered, with the loss of all eight on board.

=== De Long party ===
De Long's party found no immediate sign at their landing-place of any human habitation, and had only a sketchy idea of where they were—Petermann's map provided few useful details. On September 19, having buried their non-essential possessions in a mound marked by a tent pole, they set out in search of settlements. Progress was hampered by the poor physical condition of the men, in particular Eriksen, who was badly affected by frostbite. On September 21 they halted at two empty huts, probably part of a hunting camp, where Alexey raised spirits by shooting a deer to replenish their dwindling food stocks. De Long allowed his exhausted party several days' rest before resuming the march.

On September 28 the party found a large hut, with signs of recent occupation–edible food in the store and moccasin tracks in the snow. When searches in the locality brought no sign of people, De Long decided to move on. By October 4, Eriksen could not continue; the party halted at another abandoned hut where, on October 6, Eriksen died. On October 9, with the condition of several men worsening, De Long decided to send two of the fittest in the group, Nindemann and Noros, to seek help. Ambler was offered the opportunity to go with them, but felt that his duty as a doctor required him to stay with the main body.

For the next week De Long's party struggled on, sometimes making barely a mile a day. Although they jettisoned more of their possessions on the way, De Long insisted on carrying his maps and journals. His entry for October 10 recorded that there was "nothing for supper but a spoonful of glycerine". A few days later Alexey, the group's principal hunter, shot a ptarmigan which provided soup. However Alexey was weakening, and died on October 17.

On October 20, trapped by the weather and without supplies, the party came to a final halt. Throughout the march De Long had written up his journal each day, but after October 20 his entries became intermittent, largely limited to terse statements of the dying and the dead. He noted the deaths of Kaak and Lee on October 21, Iverson on the 28th, and Dressler on the 29th. His last entry, dated October 30, records the deaths of Boyd and Görtz and ends "Mr Collins dying".

=== Melville, Nindemann, and Noros ===
Nindemann and Noros

After resting at Arrhu, Melville's group moved out, aiming for the agreed rendezvous at Bulun. On September 19 they encountered native Tungus huntsmen, who led the party first to the tiny settlement of Little Borkhia, and then on to the larger village of Zemovialach. Here, locals advised them that they would have to wait for the river to freeze before attempting to reach Bulun.

After several weeks, Melville learned from a Russian traveler that two Americans were recuperating at Bulun. Weather conditions were now suitable for travel, so Melville hired a pair of expert local dog drivers to take him there. He left Danenhower in charge, with instructions to lead the party to Bulun as soon as practicable, and from there to proceed as best he could to Yakutsk, a large city hundreds of miles to the south. Melville arrived in Bulun on November 3, where he found Nindemann and Noros, weak but recovering.

From Nindemann and Noros, Melville learned of De Long's plight and his urgent need for rescue. The pair had endured a harrowing experience since leaving De Long nearly a month previously: they had struggled for ten days, sleeping in improvised shelters and eating what they could catch or shoot. In this fashion they reached a small, abandoned camp which they later learned was named Bulcour. Here, they had been found by a nomadic band of Yakut hunters, who had taken them to a large camp at Kumakh-Surt. To their great frustration they were unable to make the Yakuts understand that they were shipwrecked mariners whose comrades were in dire straits. They did manage to convey their desire to reach Bulun, and were taken there by sled. They arrived on October 29, a few days before Melville joined them there.

=== Searches ===
From Bulun, Melville sent messages to Washington and the Herald, advising them of Jeannette's loss and listing the survivors and missing parties. (Note: It would be many weeks before these messages reached their destinations. They had to be carried by sled and riverboat to the nearest telegraph station, at Irkutsk, 3,000 miles (4,800 km) away.) On November 5, he set out with two local guides, using rough maps supplied by Nindemann and Noros, to begin his search for De Long.

At the village of North Bulun, natives brought him notes left by De Long's party in cairns. One note directed Melville to the cache of logbooks and instruments that De Long had buried at his landing-place. Although now convinced that De Long and his comrades must have perished, Melville continued the search, but the encroaching Arctic winter meant that he could do no more that season. He returned to Bulun at the end of November and then traveled on to Yakutsk to be reunited with the other Jeannette survivors.

In January 1882, while most of the survivors began their long journey home, Melville, Nindemann and James Bartlett prepared to head a new search in the Lena Delta when weather allowed. They left Yakutsk on January 16, and resumed their search when the thaw began in mid-March. Beginning at the spot where Nindemann and Noros had left De Long the previous October, Melville began a systematic examination of the area. On March 23, he found Alexey's hunting rifle and, nearby, the remains of a camp. The team found further artifacts, a frozen human arm protruding from the snow, and finally De Long's journal. From this they learned the story of the party's final days.

Soon, all the bodies except that of Alexey, which was never found, had been recovered. Those of the last three to die—De Long, Ambler and Ah Sam—were some distance from the rest, where they had evidently attempted to set up a final camp on higher ground. Melville's party wrapped all the bodies in canvas and carried them to a hill high enough to be safe from seasonal flooding. There they placed them in a large coffin improvised from driftwood, which they covered with rocks surmounted by a large wooden cross, inscribed with the names of the lost men. Melville's group left the site on April 7, 1882, then spent a further month in the delta, searching without success for signs of Chipp and his crew.

== Aftermath ==
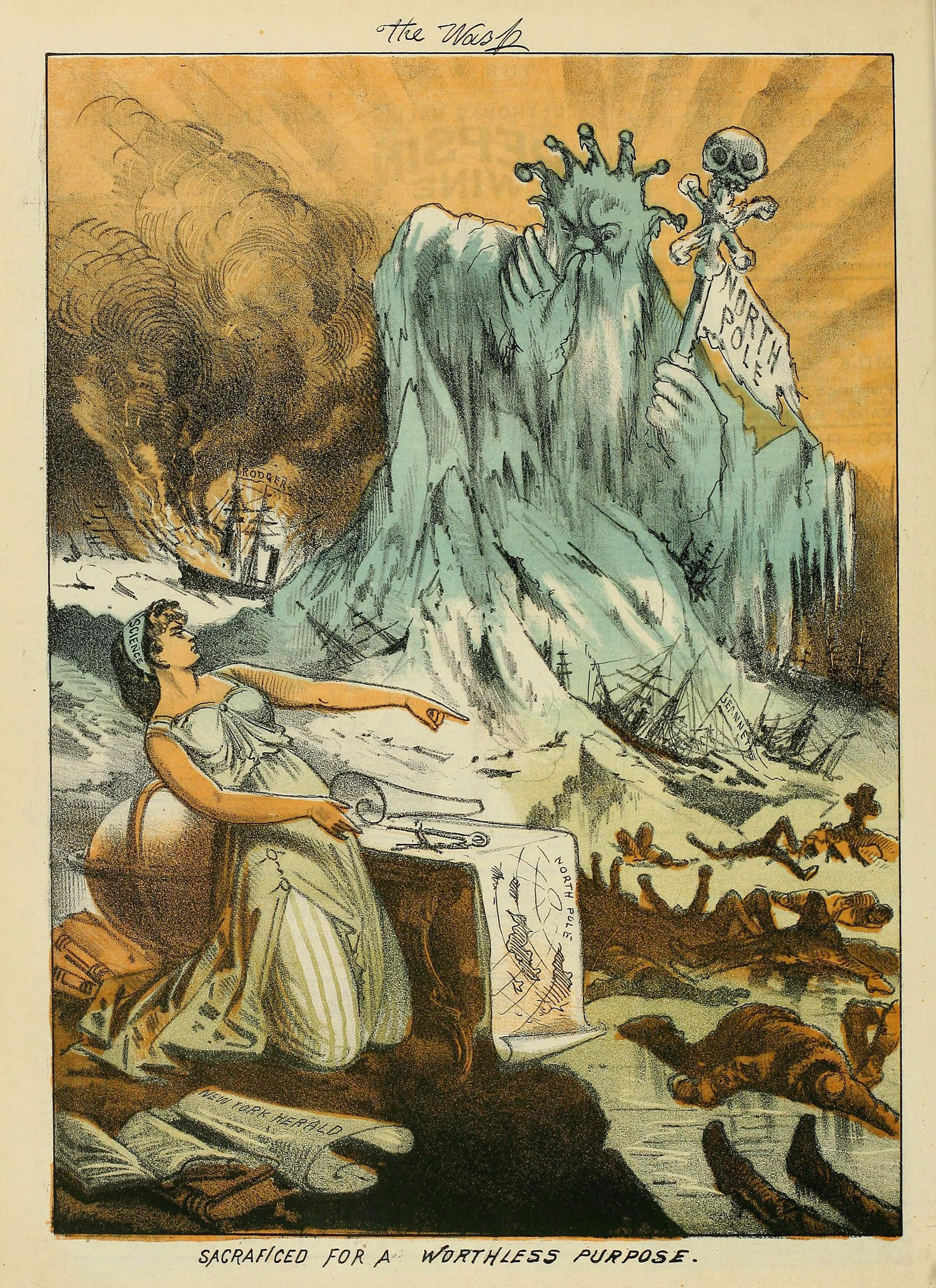
The Wasp: "sacrificed for a worthless purpose," 1882

Of the total expedition party of thirty-three men, thirteen returned alive to the U.S. The first group of survivors landed in New York in May 1882, but celebrations were deferred until the arrival, on September 13, of Melville, Nindemann, and Noros. They were welcomed as heroes, given a civic reception, and treated to a banquet at the celebrated Delmonico's restaurant.

Public interest in the Jeannette expedition had been high since the first news of the ship's fate had been received from Yakutsk. Bennett had dispatched several Herald reporters to Russia, including John P. Jackson, who had reached the Lena Delta and found De Long's tomb. In his zeal for a story, Jackson had opened the tomb to search for papers or other records, an act of desecration that Emma De Long described to Bennett as "the bitterest potion I had to swallow in my whole life". Jackson had also interviewed Danenhower, who made allegations of discord within the party and of ill-treatment of certain officers, particularly himself.

A naval inquiry into the loss of Jeannette convened at the beginning of October, at which the survivors were the principal witnesses. In February 1883, the board announced its findings: Jeannette was a fit vessel for Arctic service; difficulties such as the late start and the diversion to search for news of Vega were not De Long's fault, nor was he to blame for the ship's loss. He had conducted the subsequent retreat in an exemplary manner.

Not everybody was satisfied, however; relatives of Collins, who had heard during the evidence of trouble between De Long and the meteorologist, did not believe that the whole truth had been told and termed the enquiry a "whitewash". (Note: Collins had proved an irritant to De Long at various stages of the expedition. He was reprimanded in January 1880 for disregarding an order to take exercise; the following December, after further insubordination, De Long suspended him from duty. After the sinking, De Long had prevented Collins from working the sleds, but allowed him to hunt for seal and walrus. At the enquiry, Melville described Collins as "a duffer, bone lazy", while Danenhower cast doubt on his competence.) In April 1884, a House of Representatives Naval Affairs subcommittee reviewed the evidence, and confirmed the findings of the earlier enquiry.

In February 1882, Secretary Thompson had dispatched naval Lieutenants Giles Harber and William H. Schuetze to the Lena Delta to search for any traces of the lost explorers, particularly of Chipp's party. They were unsuccessful, but in November received orders from the secretary to supervise the return of the bodies of De Long and his comrades to the U.S. Weather and bureaucracy delayed them for a year; in November 1883 the bodies were taken from Yakutsk by train to Moscow, Berlin, and finally Hamburg, from where they were transported to New York City by SS Frisia in February 1884. Harber and Schuetze's role and considerable other detail on the expedition were included in President Chester A. Arthur's second State of the Union address.

The funeral cortège for the fallen explorers was escorted by naval and military detachments to the Church of the Holy Trinity on Madison Avenue for a memorial service. Afterwards the bodies of Ambler, Collins, and Boyd were claimed for private burial; those of De Long and six others were taken to Woodlawn Cemetery in the Bronx and buried together. In October 1890, a large monument to the expedition's dead was unveiled at the United States Naval Academy in Annapolis, Maryland. Its design is based on the original cairn and cross raised at the burial site on the Lena Delta. The sculpture Serenity by Josep Clarà i Ayats was placed in 1924 in Washington, D.C.'s Meridian Hill Park in memory of Schuetze by his friend and Naval Academy classmate Charles Deering.

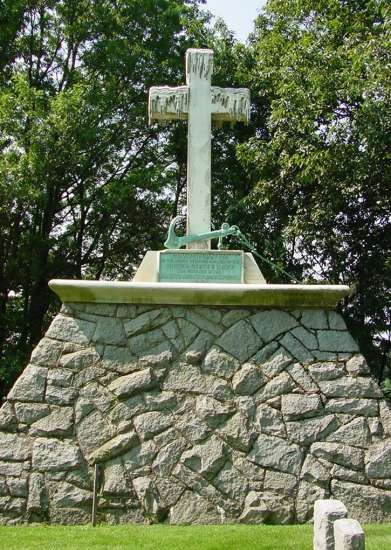
Monument at Annapolis

A mountain range in Alaska, and two naval ships, were named in De Long's honor. The three Arctic islands discovered during the expedition, plus two others discovered a few years later, form an archipelago that bears the name De Long Islands; despite Melville's planting of the American flag, the islands have always been accepted as Russian territory.

On September 30, 1890, Congress authorized the Jeannette Medal; eight Congressional Gold Medals and twenty-five Congressional Silver Medals in commemoration of the perils encountered by the officers and men of the expedition.

The expedition provided some key scientific information. On June 18, 1884, wreckage from Jeannette was found on an ice floe near Julianehåb, near the south-western corner of Greenland. This proved that a continuous ocean current flowed from east to west across the polar sea, and was the basis of Nansen's Fram expedition of 1893–1896. Also, although the Open Polar Sea theory ended with Jeannette's voyage, the ship's meteorological and oceanographic records have provided 21st-century climatologists with valuable data relating to climate change and the shrinking of the polar icecap.

=== Survivors ===
Only one of the main survivors in the Jeannette drama, Melville, returned to the Arctic, where he helped rescue survivors of Adolphus Greely's Lady Franklin Bay Expedition of 1881–1884. His naval career prospered, and he eventually achieved the rank of rear admiral. He died in 1912. Danenhower continued in the navy, but shot himself during a fit of depression in 1887.

In 1892, James Bartlett, who struggled with mental problems after his return, first threatened to kill his wife and niece before attempting to make good on his promise the next day. His wife survived with a gunshot wound to the shoulder, but both the niece and Bartlett died. Nindemann worked as a naval engineer until his death in 1913. The last survivor of the expedition was Herbert Leach, who became a factory worker; he lived until 1935. Emma De Long died at the age of 91, in 1940.
