= USS Jeannette (1878) =

American exploration vessel

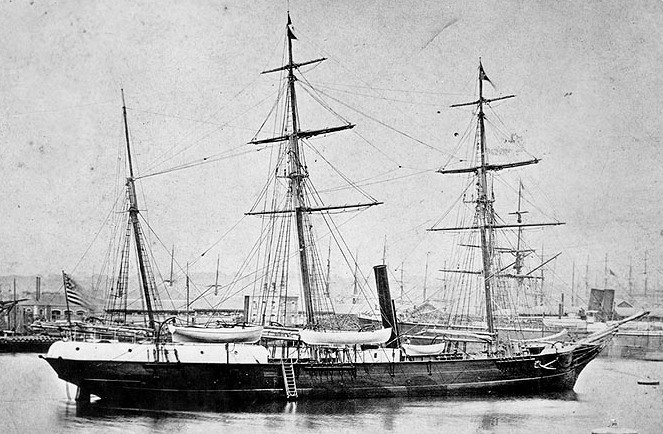
- Jeannette at Le Havre in 1878

History

United Kingdom
- Name: HMS Pandora
- Ordered: 8 April 1859
- Builder: Pembroke Dockyard
- Laid down: 30 March 1860
- Launched: 7 February 1861

United States
- Name: USS Jeannette
- Namesake: Jeanette Gordon Bennett
- Expedition: Jeannette expedition
- Departure: 8 July 1879
- Fate: Crushed in ice and sunk
- Date sunk: 13 June 1881

General characteristics
- Class & type: Philomel-class gunvessel
- Displacement: 570 long tons (579.1 metric tons)
- Tons burthen: 428 tons (bm)
- Length: 142 feet (43.3 meters)
- Beam: 24 1/3 feet (7.4 meters)
- Draft: 13 feet (4.0 meters)
- Sail plan: Bark-rigged
- Speed: ~10 knots (11.5 mph; 18.5 km/h)
- Complement: 60 officers and men

USS Jeannette was a naval exploration vessel which, commanded by George W. De Long, undertook the Jeannette expedition of 1879–1881 to the Arctic. After being trapped in the ice and drifting for almost two years, the ship and her crew of 33 were released from the ice, then trapped again, crushed and sunk some 300 nautical miles (560 km; 350 mi) north of the Siberian coast. The entire crew survived the sinking, but eight died while sailing towards land in a small cutter. The others reached Siberia, but 12 subsequently perished in the Lena Delta, including De Long.

The vessel had begun her active career in 1861 as HMS Pandora, a Royal Navy gunboat. After more than a decade's service off the West African coast and in the Mediterranean, Pandora was retired from duty and sold as a private yacht to a British explorer, Allen Young. Young took her on two voyages to the Arctic, in 1875 and 1876, before selling her to James Gordon Bennett Jr., proprietor of the New York Herald, who changed her name to Jeannette. Although she sailed to the Arctic under the U.S. flag as USS Jeannette, subject to naval laws and discipline, Bennett remained responsible for the costs of the expedition.

== Service history ==
=== Construction and launch ===
The ship that became USS Jeannette began her life as a Royal Navy gunboat, built at the Pembroke Naval Dockyards in 1860. She was of wooden construction, 146 feet (45 m) in length and 25 feet (7.6 m) at the beam, with a draft of 13 feet (4.0 m). Her tonnage, calculated by Builder's Measure, was 428 tons, with a displacement of 570 tons. She was rigged as a barque, but her principal means of propulsion was by a steam-driven screw.

After her launch on 7 February 1861, Pandora was taken from Pembroke to Portsmouth Dockyard, where she was fitted with her engines and boilers, and underwent trials before commissioning. On October 22, she concluded her trials successfully, achieving a speed of 9.25 knots over a measured mile.

=== Pandora ===
In November 1861, during the American Civil War, the diplomatic incident known as the Trent affair caused the Admiralty to bring additional ships into active service. On 27 December 1861, Pandora was formally commissioned, as tender to HMS Majestic, and the following day sailed for Liverpool where Majestic was berthed. The crisis was quickly resolved; Pandora remained at Liverpool until January 1862 before returning to Portsmouth.

In April 1863, Pandora left Portsmouth for service off the coast of West Africa. On 2 October 1866, she collided with sister ship HMS Griffon off Little Popo. Griffon sank; her crew were rescued. Pandora returned in Portsmouth in 1867, and was transferred to the reserve. In April 1868, she was recommissioned, and returned to West Africa. Two years later she was transferred to the Mediterranean squadron, based at Valletta, Malta. This was her last commission in British naval service. In July 1872, after two years in the Mediterranean, she returned to Spithead, where she was taken out of active commission and berthed in Portsmouth as part of the steam reserve.

=== Allen Young ===
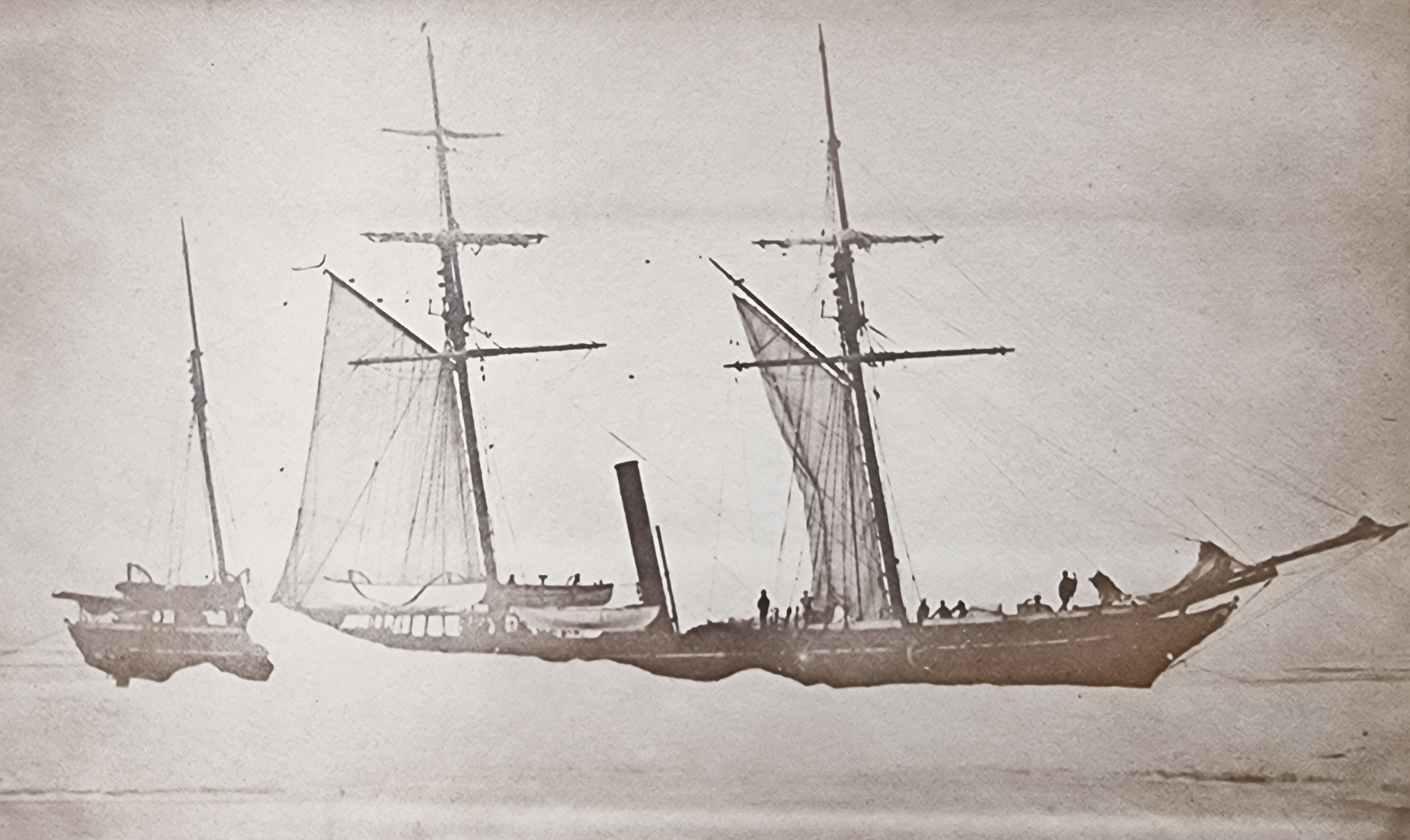
The Pandora blocked by ice around Peel Sound, 1 September, 1875

In 1875, Pandora was acquired from the navy by the yachtsman Allen Young, for use in one of the last expeditions sent to the Canadian Arctic to investigate the disappearance, 30 years previously, of the Franklin expedition. Young sailed in June 1875, seeking not only for signs of Franklin, but to discover and complete the Northwest Passage, then unconquered. He was unsuccessful on both counts; he found no traces of Franklin, was stopped by ice in Peel Sound, and he returned to England. One of the financiers for this venture was James Gordon Bennett Jr., the owner of the New York Herald.

In 1876, Young took Pandora north again, for a second attempt on the Northwest Passage. He was diverted by a request from the Admiralty to look for the British Arctic Expedition under George Nares, which was engaged in an attempt to reach the North Pole from Smith Sound. The expedition did not require Pandora's assistance, and Young returned home. In 1877, Young sold Pandora to Bennett, who was planning his own Arctic expedition.

=== Polar expedition ===
Bennett's plan was to sail a vessel through the Bering Strait, on the theory that the warm Pacific Ocean current known as the Kuro Siwo would provide a "thermometric gateway" whereby a suitable ship might reach the North Pole. This was the primary objective, but the ship was also equipped for scientific observation. By agreement with the U.S. Department of the Navy, Bennett would finance the expedition, but would sail under naval laws and discipline, and would be commanded by a naval officer, George W. De Long. Pandora was renamed Jeannette, after Bennett's sister, and in January 1879 arrived at the Mare Island Naval Shipyard, to be fitted for Arctic service.

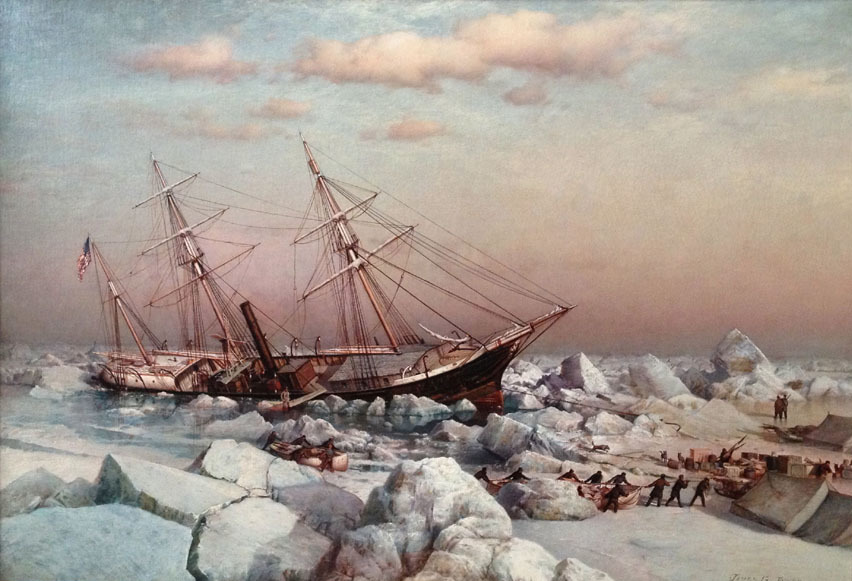
Abandoning Jeannette

Jeannette departed San Francisco on 8 July 1879. She sent her last communication to Washington from Saint Lawrence Bay, Chukotka, on 27 August. Shortly afterwards she encountered ice, of increasing severity as she pushed her way forward to Herald Island. On 7 September, she was caught fast in the ice at 71°35′N 175°6′E. For the next 21 months, Jeannette drifted in an erratic fashion, generally to the northwest but frequently doubling back on herself.

In May 1881, two islands were discovered, which De Long named Henrietta Island—after Bennett's mother—and Jeannette Island. On the night of 12 June, when they had reached 77°15′N 155°0′E, the pressure of the ice finally began to crush the Jeannette. De Long and his men unloaded provisions and equipment onto the ice, and watched until the ship sank in the early morning of June 13.

The expedition began the long trek to the Siberian coast, hauling their sledges with boats and supplies. On their way they discovered a further island which they named Bennett Island in honor of the expedition's sponsor. After reaching the New Siberian Islands and gaining some food and rest, the party took to their three boats on September 12 for the last stage of their journey to the Lena Delta, their planned landfall. As a violent storm blew up, one of the boats—with lieutenant Charles W. Chipp and seven men—capsized and sank. The other two craft, commanded by De Long and chief engineer George W. Melville with 14 and 11 men respectively, survived the severe weather but landed at widely separated points on the delta.

The party headed by De Long began the long march inland over the marshy, half-frozen delta to hoped-for native settlements. After much hardship, with many of his men severely weakened, De Long sent the two strongest, William F. C. Nindemann and Louis P. Noros, ahead for help; they eventually found a settlement and survived. De Long and his 11 companions died of cold and starvation. In the meantime, on the other side of the delta, Melville and his party had found a native village and were rescued. Melville persuaded a group of locals to help him search for his commander. He succeeded in finding their landing place on the delta, and recovered De Long's logbook and other important records but returned without locating the De Long group. In the following spring, Melville set out again, and found the bodies of De Long and his companions on 23 March 1882.

On 18 June 1884, wreckage from Jeannette was found on an ice floe near Julianehåb, near the south-western corner of Greenland. This indicated that an ocean current flowed from east to west across the polar sea. It gave the Norwegian explorer Fridtjof Nansen the idea that a properly-constructed ship could enter the ice in the east, survive the pressure during the drift, and emerge in the Atlantic, perhaps having traversed the pole itself. This theory was the basis of Nansen's Fram expedition of 1893–1896.

Although the Open Polar Sea theory ended with Jeannette's voyage, the ship's meteorological and oceanographic records have provided 21st-century climatologists with valuable data relating to climate change and the shrinking of the polar icecap.

== Recovery plan ==
In February 2015 the Russian adventurer, traveler and media personality Andrey Khoroshev announced that in consultation with the Russian Geographical Society, he was developing plans to locate and raise the wreck of Jeannette. Khoroshev told The Siberian Times: "This vessel lies at a depth of only 18 metres (59 ft), with the known location down to 1,000 metres (3,300 ft). So in modern day conditions, to find and raise it is not such a hard task." He imagined that the event would be a great boost for Russia's relations with the United States, "which are not very good right now". However, a survey of the area where the ship sank did not reveal any results and as of December 2019, it had not been found.

== In fiction ==
Captain Edward Ellsberg recounted the voyage of the Jeannette in his book Hell on Ice published in 1938. It tells the journey through the eyes of the chief engineer.

The path and fate of the Jeannette is mentioned several times in Buddy Levy's account of the disastrous journey of HMCS Karluk, Empire of Ice and Stone. The crew of the Karluk were familiar with how eerily similar their circumstances were with those experienced by the Jeannette.

== Bibliography ==
- Coleman, E. (2007). The Royal Navy and Polar Exploration. Stroud: Tempus. ISBN 9780752442075.
- De Long, E., ed. (1884). The Voyage of the Jeannette. Boston: Houghton Mifflin. ISBN 9780665141454. OCLC 906090766.
- Newcomb, R., ed. (1882). Our Lost Explorers. Hartford: Am. Pub. Co. OCLC 1050243399.
- Fleming, F. (2002). Ninety Degrees North. London: Granta. ISBN 9781862075351.
- Guttridge, L. (1988). Icebound. Shrewsbury: Airlife. ISBN 9781853100062.
- Sides, H. (2014). In the Kingdom of Ice. London: Oneworld. ISBN 9781780745213.
