= Raymond Lee Newcomb =

American naturalist, taxidermist, and astronomer

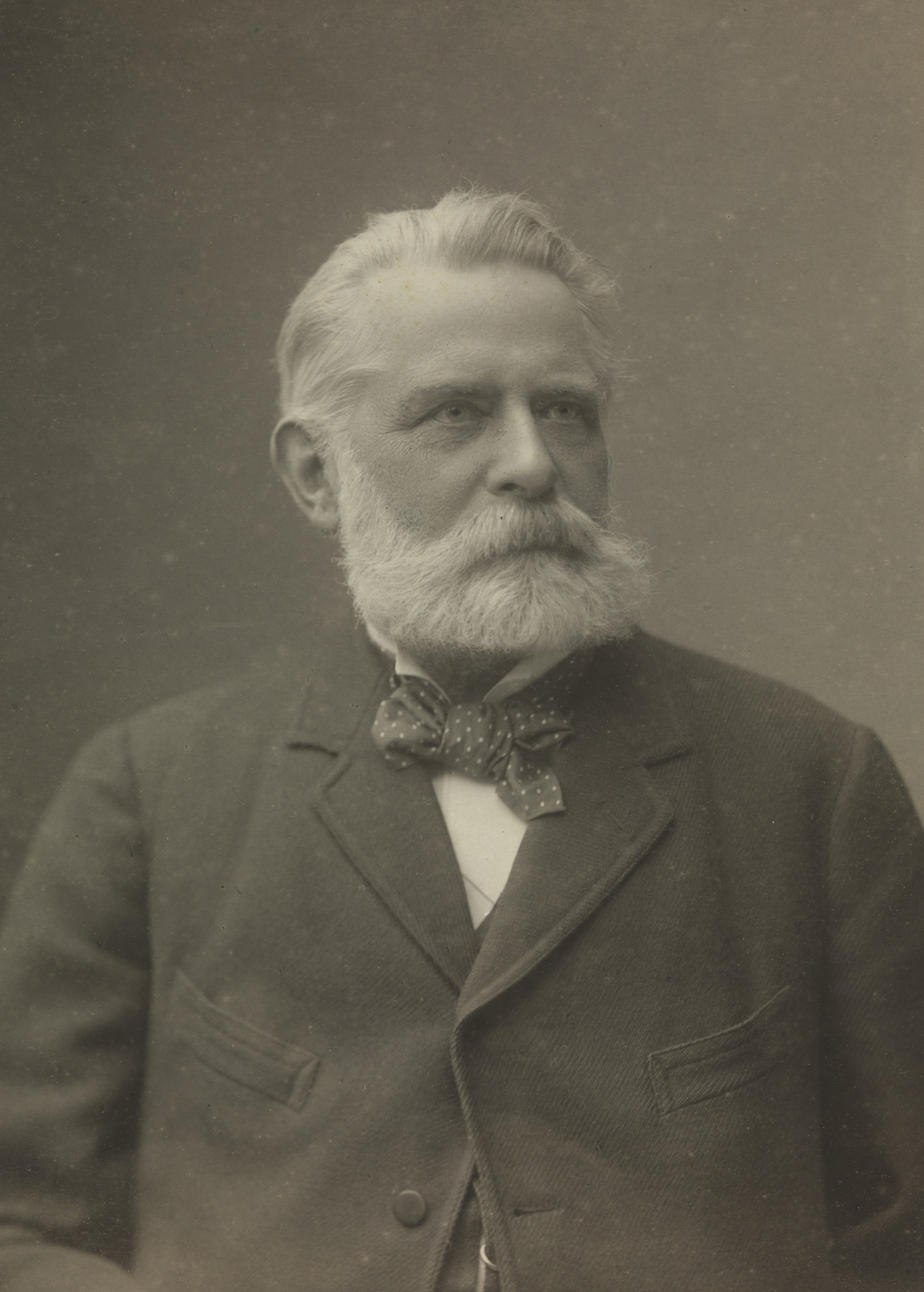
Newcomb around 1900

Raymond Lee Newcomb (December 31, 1849 – June 28, 1918) was an American naturalist, taxidermist, artist, and astronomer from Salem, Massachusetts. He was part of the Jeannette expedition and edited and co-authored Our Lost Explorers: the narrative of the Jeannette Arctic expedition as related by the survivors. The book incorporated material from his journal accounts of the expedition. He was to produce studies and bring home specimens from the ill-fated Arctic expedition.

== Biography ==
He and the other survivors were welcomed back to the United States after their Arctic expedition. In 1882, he gave a presentation to the Essex Institute. In 1883, he was scheduled to give a lecture on the expedition at Wellesley College with stereopticon images for illustration. A Congressional Set from 1884 catalogs various documents related to the expedition including statements by Newcomb. Newcomb's work included taxidermy to preserve specimens.

After his return from the Arctic expedition, he served as Salem's health officer. In 1893, he became secretary of the Salem Camera Club. In 1895, he wrote an article about photography and the expedition for Anthony's Photographic Bulletin. Edward Ellsberg wrote about Newcomb and the expedition in Cruise of the Jeannette published in 1949.
