= Charles W. Chipp =

American navy officer and arctic explorer (1848–1881)

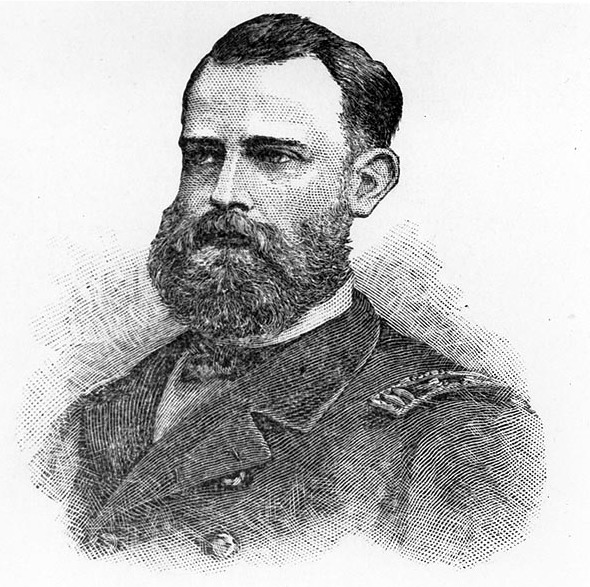
- Born: Charles Winans Chipp; August 23, 1848; Kingston, New York, U.S.
- Died: c. September 12, 1881 (aged 33); Laptev Sea, off Yakutsk, Siberia
- Military career
- Allegiance: United States
- Branch: United States Navy
- Service years: 1868–1881
- Rank: Lieutenant
- Expeditions: Korean expedition (1871); Jeannette expedition (1879)
- Awards: Gold Jeannette Medal (1890)

Charles Winans Chipp (August 23, 1848 – c. September 12, 1881) was a United States Navy officer and explorer.

== Naval career ==
Born in Kingston, New York, Chipp was educated at the United States Naval Academy in Newport, Rhode Island and Annapolis, Maryland.

After graduating in 1868, Chipp served in the steam frigate USS Franklin, flagship of the European Squadron. In 1871, he participated in the U.S. Korean expedition. In 1873 he served in USS Juniata when that ship was ordered to the coast of Greenland to search for the Arctic steamer USS Polaris. Also serving aboard Juniata was lieutenant George W. De Long, who would later be Chipp's commanding officer.

After service in several other ships, Chipp was ordered to San Francisco to serve as executive officer of USS Jeannette, with De Long commanding. Jeannette was fitting out for her mission, which would be to attempt to sail to the North Pole via the Bering Strait.

=== Jeannette expedition ===
On July 8, 1879, the Jeannette stood out to sea through the Golden Gate on her voyage of exploration. At that time, De Long wrote to his wife, "Chipp is, as he always was and always will be, calm and earnest. He has always something to do, and is always doing it in that quiet, steady and sure manner of his. He smiles rarely and says very little, but I know where he is and how reliable and true he is in every respect."

Jeannette reached St. Lawrence Bay, Siberia, on August 27, 1879, then headed north into the Chukchi Sea. She became trapped in the pack ice near Wrangel Island and in June 1881 was crushed and sank. After the ship's crew trudged across the rugged ice to open water, they set out in three small boats toward the Siberian mainland. The boats were commanded by De Long, Chipp, and the chief engineer, George W. Melville.

On September 12, 1881, the three boats were separated in a storm. Lieutenant Chipp's boat, with Chipp and seven other men aboard, was never seen again and no trace of it was ever found. The date of separation is the assumed date of Chipp's death.

== Legacy ==
The Chipp River in northern Alaska, as well as Chipp Peak on Kupreanof Island, are named in his honor.

== See also ==
- List of people who disappeared mysteriously at sea

== Bibliography ==
- De Long, E. J. (ed.) (1893). The Voyage of the Jeannette. Comprising the journals of George W. De Long.
- Danenhower, J. W. (1882). The Narrative of the Jeannette
- Guttridge, L. F. (1986). Icebound: The Jeannette Expedition's Quest for the North Pole. Annapolis: Naval Institute Press. ISBN 087021330X.
- Melville, G. W. (1885). In the Lena Delta
- Robinson, M. (2006). The Coldest Crucible: Arctic Exploration and American Culture
