= George W. Melville =

American admiral, engineer and Arctic explorer (1841–1912)

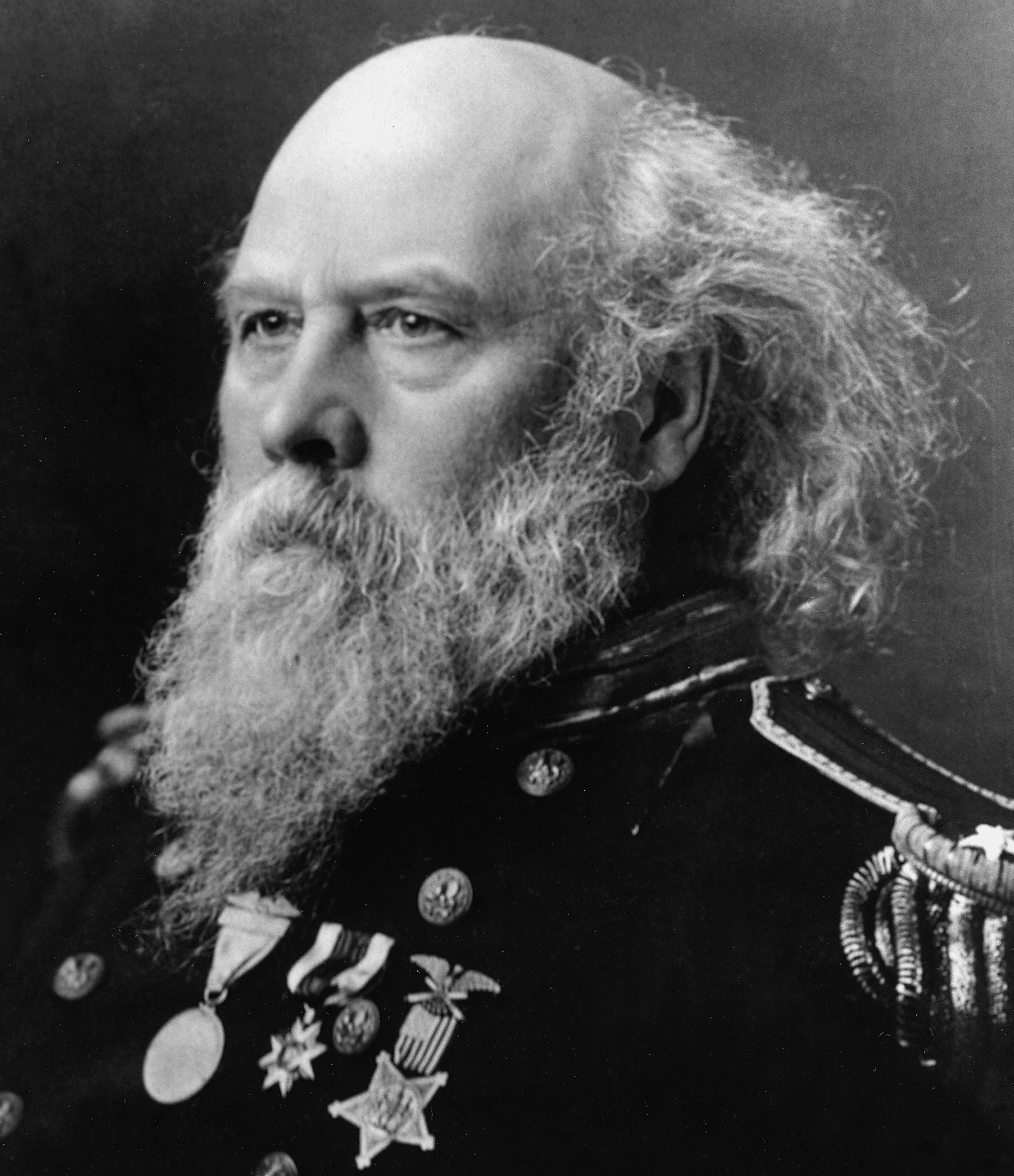
- Melville in 1904

Chief of the Bureau of Steam Engineering
- In office August 9, 1887 – August 8, 1903
- Preceded by: Charles Harding Loring
- Succeeded by: Charles Whiteside Rae

Personal details
- Born: George Wallace Melville; January 10, 1841 New York City, U.S.
- Died: March 17, 1912 (aged 71) Philadelphia, Pennsylvania, U.S.
- Resting place: Laurel Hill Cemetery, Philadelphia, Pennsylvania, U.S.
- Education: Brooklyn Polytechnic Institute
- Notable works: In the Lena Delta (1884)

Military service
- Allegiance: United States
- Branch: United States Navy
- Service years: 1861–1903
- Rank: Rear admiral
- Wars: American Civil War
- Expeditions: Jeannette expedition
- Awards: Gold Jeannette Medal (1890)

George Wallace Melville (January 10, 1841 – March 17, 1912) was a United States Navy officer, engineer and Arctic explorer.

He joined the U.S. Navy in 1861 and served as an engineer during the American Civil War. He was a member of three Arctic expeditions: a rescue operation aboard the USS Tigress in search of the lost Polaris expedition in 1873, the ill-fated Jeannette expedition in 1879, and aboard the USS Thetis in search of the Lady Franklin Bay expedition in 1884. During the Jeannette expedition, in search of the Open Polar Sea, Jeannette became icebound and was eventually crushed. Melville was one of the 13 survivors from the thirty-three men that began the expedition. The United States Congress awarded Melville the Congressional Gold Jeannette Medal for his gallantry and resourcefulness. He published a book in 1884 titled In the Lena Delta, about his experiences on the Jeanette expedition.

He was promoted to engineer in chief of the Navy in 1881, where he reformed the service and increased the professional status of Navy engineers. He established an engineering experimental station near the United States Naval Academy in Annapolis to test machinery and equipment before its installation in Navy ships as well as to aid in training engineering officers.

He served as chief of the Bureau of Steam Engineering from 1887 to 1903 and was promoted to rear admiral in 1889. He oversaw the design of 120 ships and introduced innovations including the water-tube boiler, the triple-screw propulsion system, vertical engines, the floating repair ship, and the distilling ship.

== Early life ==
Melville was born in New York City on January 10, 1841, the son of Alexander Melville, a chemist, and Sarah Wallace. He was educated at the School of the Christian Brothers, a religious academy, where he studied mathematics, and at the Brooklyn Collegiate and Polytechnic Institute.

== Naval career ==
=== American Civil War ===
He entered the U.S. Navy on July 29, 1861, and became an officer of the engineer corps, with the rank of third assistant engineer. His first year afloat was spent on the Great Lakes' gunboat Michigan, during which time he was promoted to second assistant engineer. Melville served in the sloops of war Dacotah and Wachusett from mid-1862 until late in 1864, taking part in the capture of CSS Florida in October 1864.

He finished the Civil War in the Hampton Roads, Virginia, area working with torpedo boats and as an engineer on the gunboat Maumee. After the war was over, First Assistant Engineer Melville served aboard several ships, among them the experimental cruiser Chattanooga, gunboat Tacony, steam sloop Lancaster and Asiatic Squadron flagship Tennessee. For the remainder of his life, Melville belonged to the Military Order of the Loyal Legion of the United States, serving as national commander-in-chief of the Loyal Legion from 1911 to 1912.

In 1867, Melville married Henrietta Beatty Waldron of Buffalo. The couple had three children.

=== Arctic exploration ===
In 1873, he volunteered for duty as chief engineer of USS Tigress for her rescue in Baffin Bay of 19 survivors of the Polaris expedition to the Arctic.

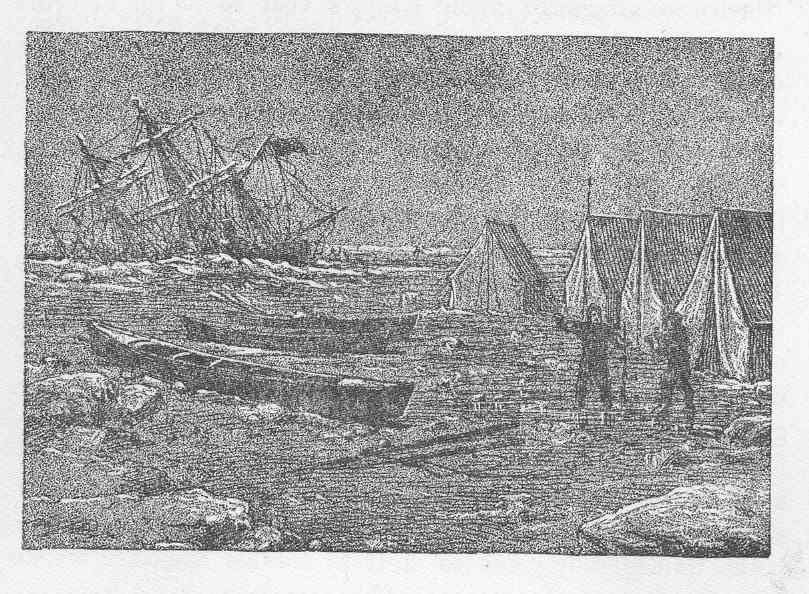
Sinking of the Jeannette

In the summer of 1879, he volunteered for the Jeanette expedition under Lieutenant Commander George W. De Long and left San Francisco aboard USS Jeannette on August 7, 1879, to try to find a way to the North Pole via the Bering Strait. Jeannette became icebound in the Chukchi Sea off of Herald Island. After two years of effort to save her, Jeanette was crushed by the ice and sank June 12, 1881 – leaving the crew stranded on the ice floes in mid-ocean in three small boats and with scant provisions.

Melville was the only boat commander to find safety in the Lena Delta in Siberia. He and his boatmates were rescued by Tungusic hunters. Four months later, he mustered a rescue team in search of De Long and his men only to find them dead. However, he was able to recover and bring back the ships' logbooks which contained the records of the expedition. The logbooks are currently maintained at the U.S. National Archives. The third boat, under the command of Charles W. Chipp, was never found and Chipp and seven other men were presumed dead.

The United States Congress rewarded Melville for his gallantry and resourcefulness by advancing him 15 numbers on the promotion list and awarded him the gold Jeannette Medal. He published his experiences and hardships of the expedition in his book, In the Lena Delta, published in 1884.

Melville was promoted to the rank of chief engineer during his time in Jeannette and returned to the Arctic in USS Thetis in 1884, for the Lady Franklin Bay Expedition in search of the survivors of an Arctic expedition commanded by Army Lieutenant Adolphus Greely.

=== Steam engineering ===
He obtained the rank of chief engineer in 1881. He served as Inspector of Coal in 1884–1886, then performed his final seagoing duty in the new cruiser Atlanta. President Grover Cleveland appointed Melville Chief of the Bureau of Steam Engineering August 9, 1887, with the relative rank of commodore.

During more than a decade and a half in that post, he was responsible for the Navy's propulsion systems during an era of remarkable force expansion, technological progress and institutional change. Melville superintended the design of 120 ships of the "New Navy". Among the major technical innovations that he helped introduce, often in defiance of the conservative opinion within the naval establishment, were the water-tube boiler, the triple-screw propulsion system, vertical engines, the floating repair ship, and the distilling ship.

He was promoted to rear admiral March 3, 1899. Melville entirely reformed the service, putting Navy engineers on a professional rather than an artisan footing.

The Annapolis laboratory was a brainchild of Melville. As engineer-in-chief of the Navy, he fought hard to get an appropriation of $400,000 for an experiment and testing laboratory to be located at Annapolis. In 1903, he finally was successful in obtaining the appropriation for the engineering experiment station.

His primary argument for the establishment of an experiment station was that it would increase the efficiency of the Navy. His idea was to establish a dependable means for testing—before installation—machinery and equipment designed for Navy ships. His secondary argument was that it could aid in training engineering officers and accordingly should be located in Annapolis near the Naval Academy.

Prior to his retirement, Melville headed a committee tasked with studying how to use fuel oil in Navy boilers instead of coal. They strongly recommended that a testing plant be developed to test methods of burning fuel in Navy boilers. On November 18, 1910, the Secretary of Navy authorized "... the construction and equipment, at an estimated cost of $10,000.00, of a structure simulating a naval fireroom, for the purpose of instigating the subject of fuel oil burning in connection with the design of proposed oil burning battleships" in an existing building at the Philadelphia Navy Yard.

== Retirement ==
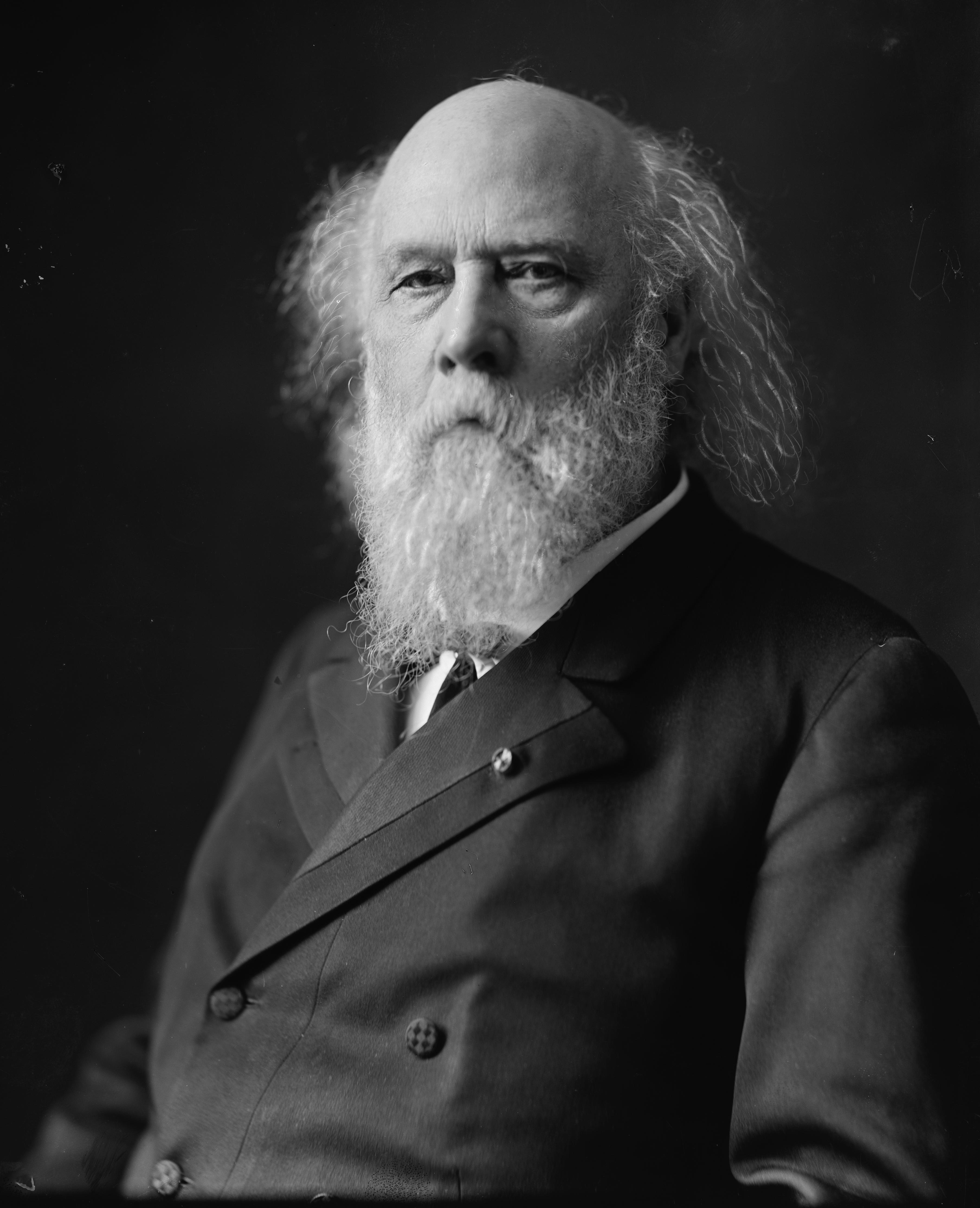
Melville between 1890 and 1910

He retired from active duty on January 10, 1903, and spent his final years in Philadelphia, where he continued to be engaged in matters relating to his profession. His first wife having died in 1882, Melville married Estella Smith Polis in 1907. She died two years later. There was no issue from their marriage.

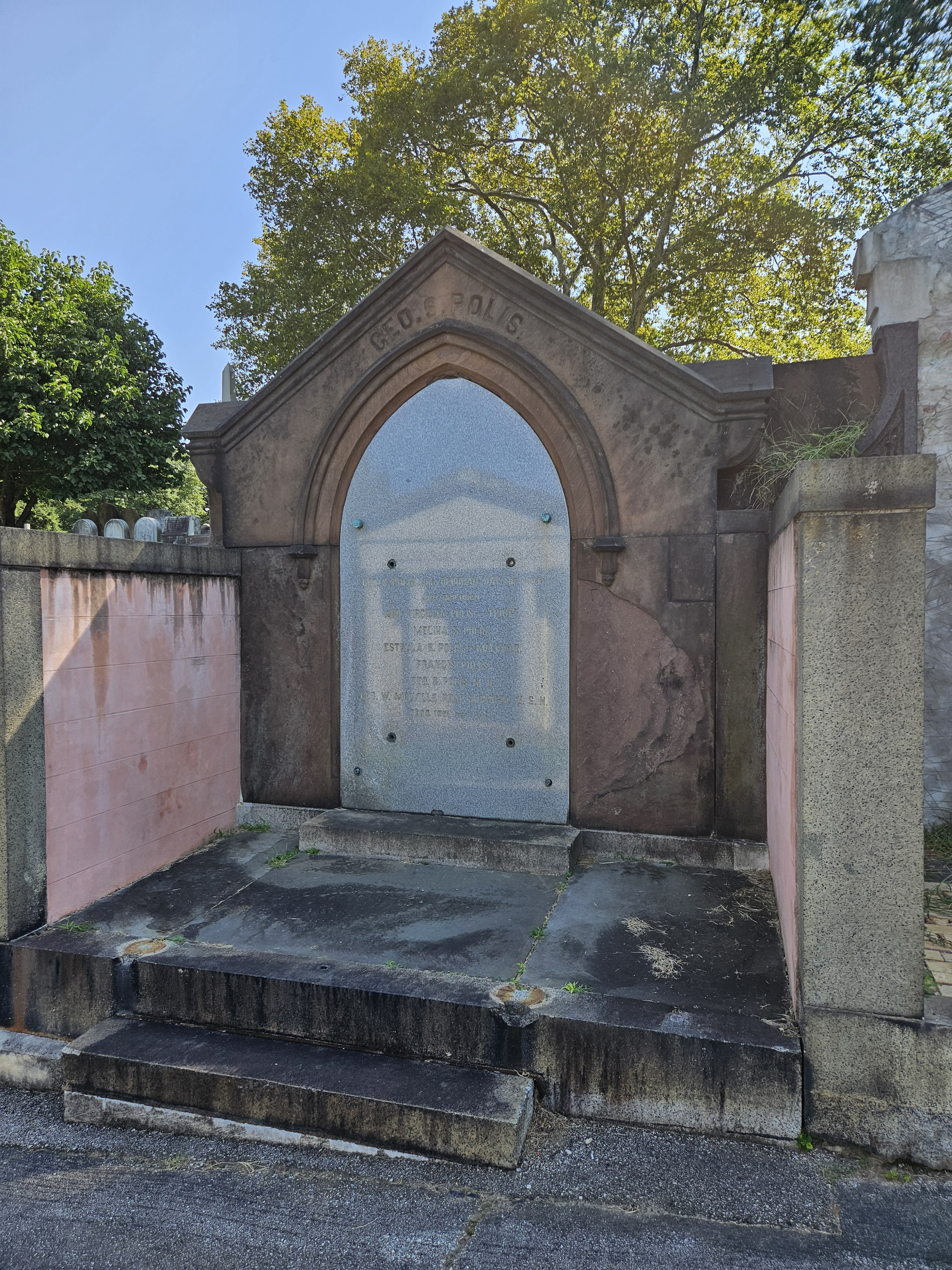
Melville's mausoleum in Laurel Hill Cemetery

Melville was the recipient of many honors during his lifetime, both in the United States and internationally. He was one of the 33 founding members of the National Geographic Society. He died in Philadelphia on March 17, 1912, and was interred at Laurel Hill Cemetery.

Melville was a companion of the District of Columbia Commandery of the Naval Order of the United States – a military society of naval officers and their descendants. In 1886, he became a companion of the Pennsylvania Commandery of the Military Order of the Loyal Legion of the United States and served as its commander from 1908 to 1909 and also served as national commander-in-chief of the Order from 1911 to 1912. He was a member of the Grand Army of the Republic and an honorary member of the American Society of Mechanical Engineers and served as its 18th president. He was also an elected member of the American Philosophical Society.

== Legacy ==
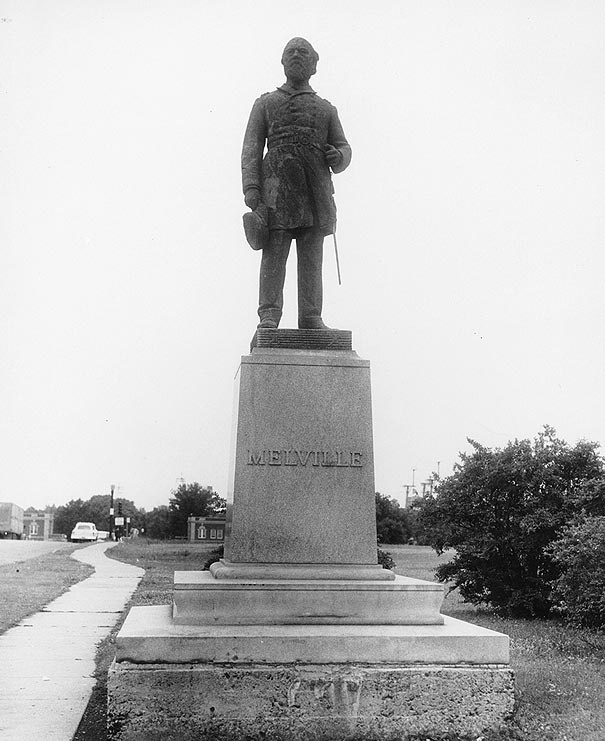
Statue of Melville by Samuel Murray in the Philadelphia Naval Shipyard

The U.S. Navy has named two ships in his honor: the destroyer tender USS Melville and the oceanographic research ship USNS Melville. Melville, Montana was named in his honor in 1877.

The Navy's George W. Melville Award recognizes outstanding engineering contributions in the applications of knowledge toward research and development of materials, devices, and systems or methods; including design, development, and integration of prototypes and new processes. The Melville Medal is awarded periodically by the American Society of Mechanical Engineers in honor of the best original paper from its transactions.

Melville Hall, built in 1937 on the campus of the United States Naval Academy, was used as classroom and laboratory space for the steam and electrical engineering departments. The hall was razed in 1982 to make way for the Academy’s Alumni Hall. Melville's name lives on as the new hall's Melville Entrance. A statue of Admiral Melville in Navy Park at the Philadelphia Naval Shipyard was created by Samuel Murray.

The Melville Glacier and Melville Land in Greenland were named after him by Robert Peary.

Melville was the subject of a portrait painted by Thomas Eakins in 1897.

== Published works ==
- In the Lena Delta; a Narrative of the Search for Lieut.-Commander DeLong and his Companions Followed by an Account of the Greely Relief Expedition and a Proposed Method of Reaching the North Pole, Houghton, Mifflin and Company, Boston, 1885
- Views of Commodore George W. Melville, Chief Engineer of the Navy, as to the Strategic and Commercial Value of the Nicaraguan Canal, the Future Control of the Pacific Ocean, the Strategic Value of Hawaii, and its Annexation to the United States, Government Printing Office, Washington, D.C., 1898
