= George W. De Long =

American polar explorer (1844–1881)

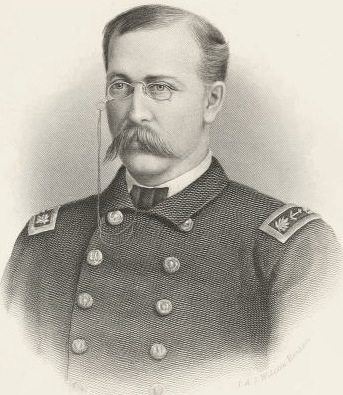
- De Long before 1879
- Born: George Francis (Note: De Long thought his middle name—"Francis"—sounded feminine. He had it legally changed to "Washington" in 1860.) De Long; August 22, 1844; New York City, U.S.
- Died: c. October 31, 1881 (aged 37); Yakutia, Siberia, Russia
- Burial place: Woodlawn Cemetery, Bronx
- Spouse: Emma Wotton De Long
- Military career
- Branch: United States Navy
- Service years: 1865–1881
- Rank: Lieutenant commander
- Expedition: Jeannette expedition
- Awards: Gold Jeannette Medal (1890)
- Memorials: Jeannette Monument

George Washington De Long (August 22, 1844 – c. October 31, 1881) was a United States Navy officer and explorer who led the ill-fated Jeannette expedition of 1879–1881, in search of the Open Polar Sea.

== Career ==
=== Jeannette expedition ===
In 1879, backed by James Gordon Bennett Jr.—owner of the New York Herald—and under the auspices of the United States Navy, Lieutenant Commander De Long sailed from San Francisco on the ship USS Jeannette with a plan to find a way to the North Pole via the Bering Strait. As well as collecting scientific data and animal specimens, De Long discovered three islands and claimed them for the United States in the summer of 1881. The government did not endorse this claim, and the islands are under Russian jurisdiction.

The USS Jeannette became trapped in the ice pack in the Chukchi Sea northeast of Wrangel Island in September 1879. It drifted in the ice pack in a northwesterly direction until it was crushed in the shifting ice and sank on June 12, 1881 in the East Siberian Sea. De Long and his crew then traversed the ice pack to try to reach Siberia, pulling three small boats.

After reaching open water on September 11 they became separated and one boat, commanded by Executive Officer Charles W. Chipp, was lost; no trace of it was ever found. De Long's own boat reached land, but only two men sent ahead for aid survived. The third boat, under the command of Chief Engineer George W. Melville, reached the Lena Delta and its crew were rescued. Melville later found and brought to the U.S. the ship's log books which now sit in the U.S. National Archives.

== Death ==
De Long died of starvation near Matvay Hut, Yakutia. Melville returned a few months later and found the bodies of De Long and his boat crew. Overall, the doomed voyage took the lives of 20 expedition members, as well as additional men lost during the search operations. De Long's death – and that of the other men – was assumed to have occurred at or about the end of October. Local Sakha people living in Bykovsky helped his crew to make their way up the Lena. By direction of the United States government, the remains of De Long and his companions were brought home and interred with honour in his native city.

=== Legacy ===
In 1890, the officers and men of the United States Navy dedicated the Jeannette Monument, a granite-and-marble monument designed by George P. Colvocoresses—a cross with carved icicles hanging from it that sits atop a cairn. The 24-foot (7.3 m)-high structure is in the United States Naval Academy Cemetery overlooking the Severn River.

His journal, in which he made regular entries up to the day on which he died, was edited by his wife and published in 1883 under the title Voyage of the "Jeannette", and an account of the search which was made for him and his comrades by Melville was published a year later under the title of In the Lena Delta.

Union veterans in the Kingdom of Hawai‘i on September 23, 1882, named the post of the Grand Army of the Republic there after him.

Two United States Navy ships have been named USS DeLong after George W. De Long. In addition to the De Long Islands, the De Long Mountains in northwest Alaska, The De Long Strait separating Wrangel Island from mainland Eurasia and the De Long Fjord in Greenland bear his name.

It was noted that the help provided to De Long's USS Jeannette expedition by the Sakha people of Bykovsky became a point of local pride and interest in the years after the incident. De Long's expedition was studied by schoolchildren in geography classes.
