= History of the Jews in Ireland =

Irish Jews
Giúdaigh Éireannacha (Irish) יהודים איריים (Hebrew)
- The location of Ireland (dark green) in relation to the rest of Europe

Total population
- 2,892 (2016 census, Republic of Ireland, 2011 census, Northern Ireland)

Regions with significant populations
- Dublin, Belfast

Languages
- English; historically Hiberno-Yiddish, and Ladino

Religion
- Judaism

Related ethnic groups
- Ashkenazi Jews, British Jews, French Jews, Litvaks, Sephardic Jews

The history of the Jewish People in Ireland extends for almost a millennium. The Jewish community in Ireland has always been small in numbers in modern history, not exceeding 5,500 since at least 1891.

== Middle Ages through 16th century ==
The earliest reference to the Jews in Ireland concerns the year 1079. The Annals of Inisfallen record that in that year "Five Jews came from overseas with gifts to Toirdelbach Ua Briain (the king of Munster) and they were sent back again overseas".

No further reference is found until the 1169 Norman invasion of Ireland launched by Richard de Clare, 2nd Earl of Pembroke (commonly known by his nickname, Strongbow) in defiance of a prohibition by Henry II of England. Strongbow seems to have been assisted financially by a Jewish moneylender, for under the date of 1170 the following record occurs: "Josce Jew of Gloucester owes 100 shillings for an amerciament for the money which he lent to those who against the king's prohibition went over to Ireland".

By 1232, there was presumably a Jewish community in Ireland, as a grant of 28 July 1232 by King Henry III to Peter de Rivel gives him the office of Treasurer and Chancellor of the Irish Exchequer, the king's ports and coast, and also "the custody of the King's Judaism in Ireland". This grant contains the additional instruction that "all Jews in Ireland shall be intentive and respondent to Peter as their keeper in all things touching the king". The Jews of this period probably resided in or near Dublin. In the Dublin White Book of 1241, there is a grant of land containing various prohibitions against its sale or disposition by the grantee. Part of the prohibition reads "vel in Judaismo ponere" (prohibiting it from being sold to Jews). The last mention of Jews in the "Calendar of Documents Relating to Ireland" appears about 1286. After the 1290 Edict of Expulsion of Jews from England, Jews living in the English Pale around Dublin may have had to leave English jurisdiction.

Jews certainly lived in Ireland long before Oliver Cromwell in 1657 revoked the English Edict of Expulsion. A permanent settlement of Jews was established in the late 15th century. Following their expulsion from Portugal in 1497, some of these Sephardic Jews settled on Ireland's south coast. One of them, William Annyas, was elected mayor of Youghal, County Cork, in 1555. Francis Annyas (Ãnes), was a three-time Mayor of Youghal in 1569, 1576 and 1581.

== 17th to 19th century ==
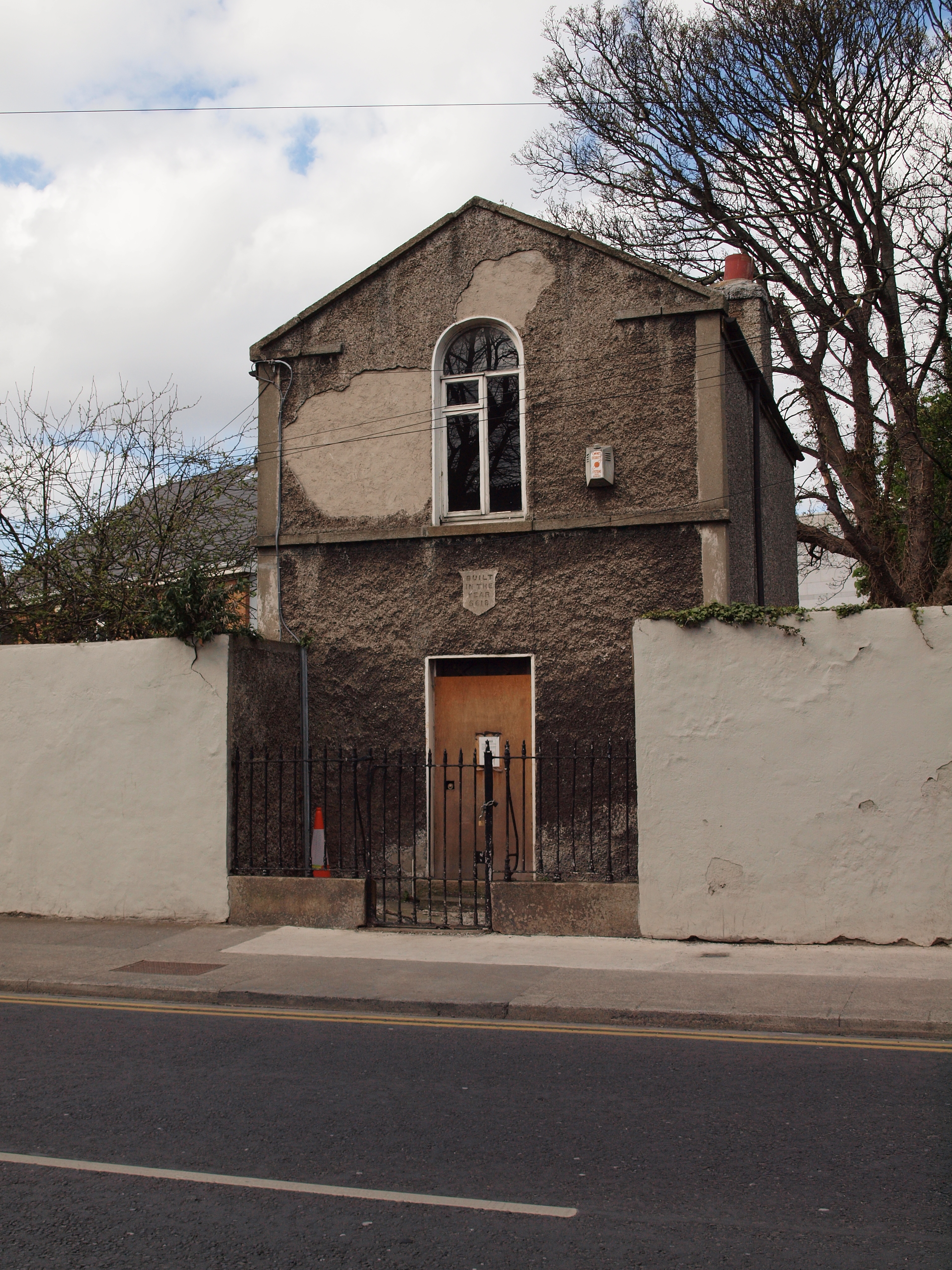
Ballybough Jewish Cemetery gate lodge in 2020

Ireland's first synagogue was founded in 1660 near Dublin Castle. The community acquired a plot of land in 1718 that became Ireland's first Jewish cemetery, called Ballybough Cemetery. The cemetery is located in the Fairview district of Dublin, where there was a small Jewish colony.

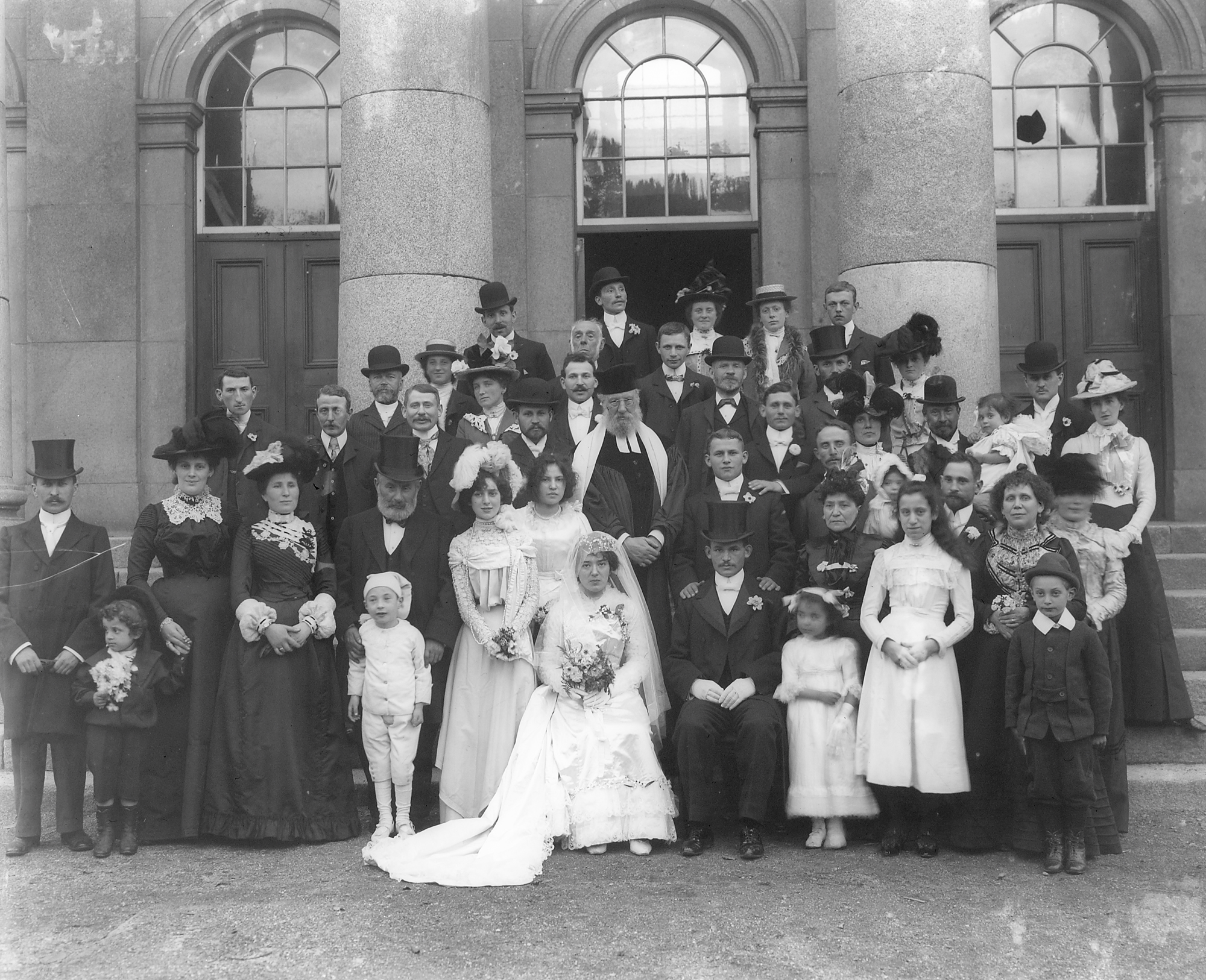
Jewish wedding at the Waterford Courthouse, early September 1901

=== Emancipation ===
In December 1714, Irish philosopher John Toland issued a pamphlet entitled Reasons for Naturalizing the Jews in Great Britain and Ireland. In 1746, a bill was introduced in the Irish House of Commons "for naturalising persons professing the Jewish religion in Ireland". This was the first reference to Jews in the House of Commons up to this time. Another was introduced in the following year, agreed to without amendment, and presented to the Lord Lieutenant of Ireland William Stanhope, 1st Earl of Harrington to be transmitted to London, though it never received royal assent. These Irish bills, however, had one crucial result; namely, the formation of the Committee of Diligence, which was organized by British Jews at this time to watch the progress of the measure. This ultimately led to the organization of the Board of Deputies, an important body which has continued in existence to the present time. Jews were expressly excepted from the benefit of the Irish Naturalization Act 1783 (23 & 24 Geo. 3. c. 38 (I)). The exceptions in the Naturalisation Act 1783 were abolished in 1846. The Marriages (Ireland) Act 1844 (7 & 8 Vict. c. 81) expressly made provision for marriages according to Jewish rites in section XII.

Daniel O'Connell is best known for the campaign for Catholic emancipation, but he also supported similar efforts for Jews. In 1846, at his insistence, the law "De Judaismo", prescribing a special dress for Jews, was repealed. O'Connell said: "Ireland has claims on your ancient race, it is the only country that I know of unsullied by any one act of persecution of the Jews". During the Great Famine (1845–1852), in which approximately one million Irish people died, many Jews helped to organize and gave generously towards famine relief. A Dublin newspaper, commenting in 1850, pointed out that Baron Lionel de Rothschild and his family had,

...contributed during the Irish famine of 1847 ... a sum far beyond the joint contributions of the Devonshires, and Herefords, Lansdownes, Fitzwilliams and Herberts, who annually drew so many times that amount from their Irish estates.

In 1874, Lewis Wormser Harris was elected to Dublin Corporation as Alderman for South Dock Ward. Two years later he was elected as Lord Mayor of Dublin, but he died 1 August 1876 before he took office. In 1901, Albert L. Altman, a successful Dublin salt merchant, was elected to the corporation as Usher's Quay ward Town Councilor. He served for three years until his death in 1903. During his time in office he was at the center of some of the most volatile nationalist controversies of the era, including the Post-Parnell split within the Irish Parliamentary Party, his own leadership of a Temperance-labor insurgency within Home Rule circles, and the council's decision to refuse a formal welcome to Edward VII on his first visit to the city as the new king, an event James Joyce made the centre of his Dubliners' story "Ivy Day in the Committee Room." Although a convert to Catholicism, Altman suffered Jew-baiting and antisemitic jeers throughout his many years seeking municipal office.

There was an increase in Jewish immigration to Ireland during the late 19th century. In 1871, the Jewish population of Ireland was 258; by 1881, it had risen to 453. Most of the immigration up to this time had come from England or Germany. A group who settled in Waterford were Welsh, whose families originally came from Central Europe.

In 1892 a new headquarters of the Dublin Hebrew Congregation was established. The building was consecrated by Hermann Adler, Chief Rabbi of the British Empire, who declared "Ireland is the only country in the world which cannot be charged with persecuting Jews".

== 20th century ==
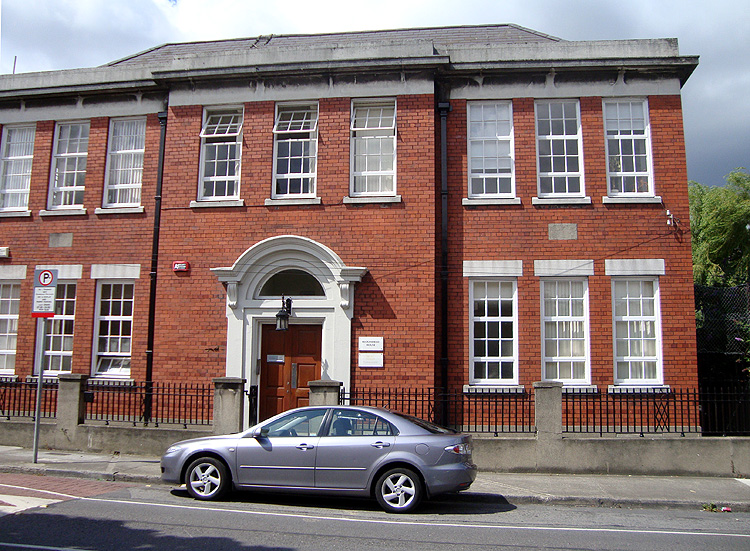
The former Jewish school in Bloomfield Avenue, Portobello, Dublin

In the wake of pogroms in the Russian Empire, there was increased Jewish immigration to Ireland, mostly from Eastern Europe (in particular Lithuania). By 1901, there were an estimated 3,771 Jews in Ireland, over half of them (2,200) residing in Dublin. By 1904, the total Jewish population was an estimated 4,800 people. New synagogues and schools were established to cater to the immigrants, many of whom established shops and other businesses. Many of the subsequent generations became prominent in business, academic, political, and sporting circles.

On 10 September 1908 Irish Jews founded the "Judeo-Irish Home Rule Association" to advocate for Home rule in Ireland. It held its inaugural meeting at the Mansion House, Dublin, an occasion facilitated by Dublin Councillor Mendal Altman. The association pledged itself to "full grant of self-government, such as accepted by the Irish Parliamentary Party, to foster Irish industries and in general to promote the welfare and prosperity of Ireland".

From 1925 to 2002, a Jewish Scout Group operated in Dublin, the 16th Dublin, with its own campsite in Powerscourt Estate for much of that period. This is only Jewish Scout campsite to have existed in the UK or Ireland. One of the Scout Groups leaders, Maurice "Morrie" Gordon, was thought on his retirement to be the longest-serving Jewish Scout leader in the world. He was awarded the Silver Elk, the highest award of the Scout Association of Ireland.

=== Limerick Boycott ===
The economic boycott waged against the small Jewish community in Limerick City in the first decade of the 20th century is known as the Limerick Boycott (and sometimes the "Limerick Pogrom") and caused many Jews to leave the city. It was instigated by an influential Redemptorist priest, Father John Creagh who called for a boycott during a sermon in January 1904. A teenager, John Raleigh, was arrested by the police and imprisoned for a month for attacking Rabbi Elias Levin, the community's rabbi, but returned home to a welcoming throng. According to an RIC report, five Jewish families left Limerick "owing directly to the agitation" and 26 families remained. Some of the five went to Cork, where trans-Atlantic passenger ships docked at Cobh (then known as Queenstown). They intended to travel to America. Gerald Goldberg, a son of this migration, became Lord Mayor of Cork in 1977. In 1970, Goldberg characterized it as a "near genocide perpetrated … against some 150 defenceless Jewish men, women and children" and that Jews did not "need a dictionary to define a pogrom".

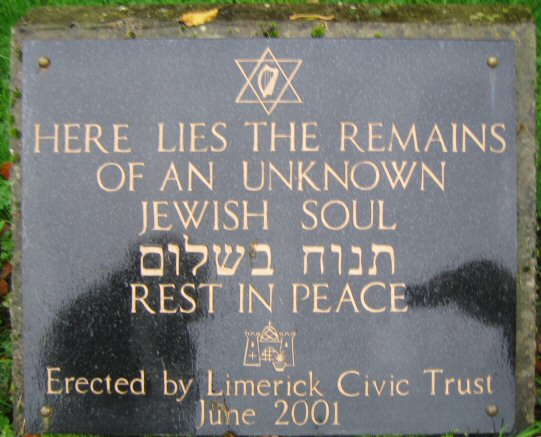
Grave of an unknown Jew in Castletroy, Limerick - now known to be Elsa Reininger, who committed suicide, rather than being returned to Austria in 1938

The boycott was condemned by many in Ireland, among whom was the influential Standish O'Grady in his paper All Ireland Review, depicting Jews and Irish as "brothers in a common struggle", though using language differentiating between the two. The Land Leaguer Michael Davitt (author of The True Story of Anti-Semitic Persecutions in Russia), in the Freeman's Journal, attacked those who had participated in the riots and visited homes of Jewish victims in Limerick. His friend, Corkman William O'Brien MP, leader of the United Irish League and editor of the Irish People, had a Jewish wife, Sophie Raffalovic.

Father Creagh was moved by his superiors initially to Belfast and then to an island in the Pacific Ocean. In 1914 he was promoted by the Pope to be Vicar Apostolic of Kimberley, Western Australia, a position he held until 1922. He died in Wellington, New Zealand in 1947.

Joe Briscoe, son of Robert Briscoe, the Dublin Jewish politician, describes the Limerick episode as "an aberration in an otherwise almost perfect history of Ireland and its treatment of the Jews". Since 1983, several commentators have questioned the traditional narrative of the event, and especially whether the event's description as a pogrom is appropriate. Historian Dermot Keogh sympathised with the use of the term by the Jews who experienced the event, and respected its use by subsequent writers, but preferred the term "boycott". Creagh's antisemitic campaign, while virulent, did not result in the murder of any member of Limerick's Jewish community. The 1911 census records that, not only were 13 of the remaining 26 families still resident in Limerick six years later but that nine new Jewish families had joined them. The Jewish population numbered 122 persons in 1911 as opposed to 171 in 1901. This had declined to just 30 by 1926.

=== War of Independence ===
Two Irish Jews supported the Irish Republican Army (IRA) and the First Dail during the Irish War of Independence. Michael Noyk was a Lithuanian-born solicitor who became famous for defending captured Irish Republicans such as Sean MacEoin. Robert Briscoe was a prominent member of the IRA during the Irish War of Independence and the Irish Civil War. He was sent by Michael Collins to Germany in 1920 to be the chief agent for procuring arms for the IRA. Briscoe proved to be highly successful at this mission, and arms arrived in Ireland in spite of the British blockade. Briscoe was also involved later in the Israeli independence movement and advised Menachem Begin to disband the Irgun militia, to prevent a civil war among the Israelis afterwards, after learning from the Irish struggle. Years later, when his son Ben Briscoe visited Israel in 1974, he recalled that Begin had fond memories of his role. Michael Collins also hid in a Jewish home and disguised himself in Jewish attire to hide from the British authorities at one point and even cursed at the Black and Tans in Yiddish.

=== Irish Free State Senate ===
In an effort to provide minority communities with political representation in parliament (as was the case with minority Christian denominations) Ellen Cuffe (Countess of Desart), a member of the Jewish community, was appointed for a twelve-year term by W. T. Cosgrave to the Irish Senate in 1922. She sat as an independent member until her death in 1933. She was also an advocate for the Irish language and served as President of the Gaelic League.

=== Constitutional provision ===
The Irish Constitution of 1937 specifically gave constitutional protection to Jews. This was considered to be a necessary component to the constitution by Éamon de Valera because of the treatment of Jews elsewhere in Europe at the time. The reference to the Jewish Congregations in the Irish Constitution was removed in 1973 with the Fifth Amendment, the same amendment that removed the 'special position' of the Catholic Church, as well as references to the Church of Ireland, the Presbyterian Church, the Methodist Church, and the Religious Society of Friends.

=== Kindertransport to Northern Ireland ===
A committee organized the Kindertransport. About ten thousand unaccompanied children aged between three and seventeen from Germany and Czechoslovakia were permitted entry into the United Kingdom without visas in 1939. Some of these children were sent to Northern Ireland. Many of them were looked after by foster parents but others went to the Millisle Refugee Farm (Magill's Farm, on the Woburn Road) which took refugees from May 1938 until its closure in 1948.

=== World War II and aftermath ===
The Irish envoy to Berlin, Charles Bewley, appointed in 1933, became an admirer of Hitler and National Socialism. His reports contained incorrect information on the treatment of Jews in Germany, and he was against allowing Jews to move to Ireland. After being reprimanded by Dublin, he was dismissed in 1939.

The Irish state was officially neutral during World War II, known in Ireland as "The Emergency", although it is estimated that about 100,000 men from the state took part on the side of the Allies. In Rome, T.J. Kiernan, the Irish Minister to the Vatican, and his wife, Delia Murphy (a noted traditional ballad singer), worked with the Irish priest Hugh O'Flaherty to save many Jews and escaped prisoners of war. Jews conducted religious services in the church of San Clemente of the 'Collegium Hiberniae Dominicanae', which had Irish diplomatic protection.

There was some domestic anti-Jewish sentiment during World War II, most notably expressed in a notorious speech to the Dáil in 1943, when newly elected independent TD Oliver J. Flanagan advocated "routing the Jews out of the country". On the other hand, Henning Thomsen, the German chargé d'affaires, officially complained of press commentaries. In February 1939, he protested against the Bishop of Galway who had issued a pastoral letter, along similar lines, accusing Germany of "violence, lying, murder and the condemning of other races and peoples".

There was some official indifference from the political establishment to the Jewish victims of the Holocaust during and after the war. This indifference would later be described by Minister for Justice, Equality and Law Reform Michael McDowell as being "antipathetic, hostile and unfeeling". Dr. Mervyn O'Driscoll of University College Cork reported on the unofficial and official barriers that prevented Jews from finding refuge in Ireland although the barriers have been down ever since:

Although overt anti-Semitism was not typical, the southern Irish were indifferent to the Nazi persecution of the Jews and those fleeing the Third Reich. ... A successful applicant in 1938 was typically wealthy, middle-aged, or elderly, single from Austria, Roman Catholic and desiring to retire in peace to Ireland and not engage in employment. Only a few Viennese bankers and industrialists met the strict criterion of being Catholic, although possibly of Jewish descent, capable of supporting themselves comfortably without involvement in the economic life of the country.

Two Irish Jews, Ettie Steinberg and her infant son, are known to have been murdered in the Holocaust, which otherwise did not substantially directly affect the Jews actually living in Ireland. At least 6 Jews from Ireland are known to have been murdered in the Shoah. The Wannsee Conference listed the 4,000 Jews of Ireland to be among those marked for killing in the Holocaust.

Post-war, Jewish groups had great difficulty in getting refugee status for Jewish children, whereas the Irish Red Cross had no difficulties with Operation Shamrock, which brought over 500 Christian children, mainly from the Rhineland. The Department of Justice explained in 1948 that:

It has always been the policy of the Minister for Justice to restrict the admission of Jewish aliens, for the reason that any substantial increase in our Jewish population might give rise to an anti-Semitic problem.

However, de Valera overruled the Department of Justice and the 150 refugee Jewish children were brought to Ireland in 1948. Earlier, in 1946, 100 Jewish children from Poland were brought to Clonyn Castle in County Westmeath by Solomon Schonfeld. The children were later reunited with their families or started new lives in Israel, the United Kingdom, and United States. In 2000 many of the Clonyn Castle children returned for a reunion. In 1952 he again had to overrule the Department of Justice to admit five Orthodox families who were fleeing the Communists. In 1966, the Dublin Jewish community arranged the planting and dedication of the Éamon de Valera Forest in Israel, near Nazareth, in recognition of his consistent support for Ireland's Jews.

== 21st century ==
In 2006, Tesco, a British supermarket chain, had to apologize for selling The Protocols of the Elders of Zion and other antisemitic titles via its online stores in Britain and Ireland. Shaheed Satardien, head of the Muslim Council of Ireland, said this was effectively "polluting the minds of impressionable young Islamic people with hate and anger towards the Jewish community".

== Congregations, synagogues and amenities ==
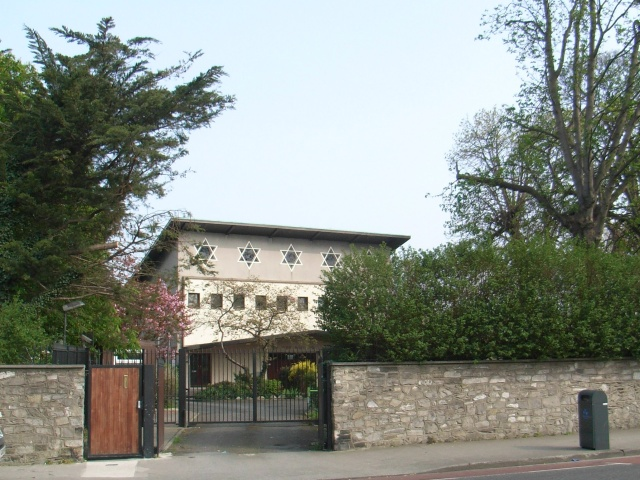
Orthodox Synagogue, Terenure, Dublin

The Jewish Representative Council of Ireland (JRCI) is the main body representing the Jewish community in the Republic of Ireland. There is one Orthodox congregation in Dublin and one Progressive, each with a synagogue. Machzikei Hadass, the last Haredi denomination, shut down in 2022. The synagogue in Cork closed in 2016, although a new Reform Jewish community started after the closure – currently without a synagogue building.

There is one Orthodox congregation in Belfast in Northern Ireland.

Two schools founded by the Dublin Jewish community continue to operate, in Rathgar - Stratford National School, and Stratford College, a secondary school. There is also a Chabad house. In March 2023, a kosher restaurant called Deli 613 opened in Dublin, the first fully kosher eatery operating in Ireland since the late 1960s.

The Irish Jewish Museum, including a former synagogue, is situated in Portobello.

== Irish Jews in sport ==
Bethel Solomons played rugby union for Wesley College and for Ireland earning 10 caps from 1907 to 1910.

The Lithuanian-born Louis Buchalter (later Bookman) (1890–1943) who moved to Ireland as a child, played soccer at international level for Ireland (winning the Home International Championship in 1914), as well as playing at club level for Shelbourne and Belfast Celtic, he also played cricket for Railway Union Cricket Club, the Leinster Cricket Club and for the Irish National Cricket Team.

Louis Jacobson played cricket for Ireland opening the innings on 12 occasions, and also at club level in Dublin as the opening bat for Clontarf C.C. and earlier, for Carlisle Cricket Club in Kimmage which was made up of members of the Dublin Jewish community.

Dublin Maccabi was a soccer team in Kimmage/Terenure/Rathgar. They played in the Dublin Amateur Leagues; only players who were Jewish played for them. Maccabi played their games in the KCR grounds which opened in the 1950s. They disbanded in 1995 due to dwindling numbers and disputes over fees, and many of their players joined the Parkvale F.C.

For a time, the Dublin Jewish Chess Club played in the Leinster Chess Leagues, winning the Ennis Shield in 1936 and being promoted to play in the Armstrong Cup. Riga born Philip Baker (1880–1932) was Irish Chess Champion in 1924, 1927, 1928 and 1929.

There was also a Dublin Jewish Boxing Club, on the south side of the city. It was based for its existence of many years, in the basement of the Adelaide Road Synagogue, which was the largest synagogue in the country. Many fine boxers were produced, amongst whom were Sydney Curland, Freddie Rosenfield, Gerry Kostick, Frank and Henry Isaacson, and Zerrick Woolfson. As a boxer, Gerry Kostick represented Ireland at the 1949 Maccabiah Games and the 1953 Maccabiah Games and, representing Trinity College Dublin, won two Universities Athletic Union titles. Kostick also played rugby and football for Carlisle for over ten years, while Woolfson also played cricket for Carlisle C.C. for several years, and, in 1949 for Dublin University, when he bowled a hat-trick in his first match. As reported in the newspapers, he dismissed John V. Luce, Mick Dargan, and Gerry Quinn with 3 successive balls. He also played first division table-tennis for Anglesea T.T.C. as the number 3 player, joining Willie Heron and Ernie Sterne, both international players, on the 1st team.

== Antisemitism ==
Antisemitism in Ireland may have included a range of manifestations, however, some say that its history is often excluded from collective narratives. In 1904, an anti-Jewish incident known as the Limerick boycott took place, and in 1961, a Dublin synagogue was vandalised with Nazi swastikas.

According to the Anti-Defamation League, 21% of Ireland's adult population hold "antisemitic or anti-Israel" views. In 2024, some Irish Jews reported feelling threatened because of their Jewishness, while the President of the World Jewish Congress criticised elements of the Irish school curriculum as "unabashedly antisemitic", citing an element entitled "Talk about Palestine".

=== In politics ===
Arthur Griffith, founder of Sinn Féin, took a hardline anti-Dreyfusard stance as editor of the United Irishman. In a series of editorials, Griffith attacked "the Jew traitor" Dreyfus, saying they are, "almost all Jew rags"; and decried

Fifty other rags like those which have nothing behind them but the forty or fifty thousand Jewish usurers and pick- pockets in each country and which no decent Christian ever reads except holding his nose as a precaution against nausea.

Other editorials in Griffith's United Irishman that year had expressed concern about a conspiracy where "the Jew capitalist has got a grip on the lying "Press of Civilization" from Vienna to New York and further", and concluded "we know that all Jews are pretty sure to be traitors if they get the chance." The United Irishman also published articles signed by 'The Home Secretary' (Frank Hugh O'Donnell) that were antisemitic in tone, including one in 1899 that stated:

I have in former years often declared that the Three Evil Influences of the century were the Pirate, the Freemason, and the Jew.

In 1904, a piece in the paper voiced support for the Limerick boycott, a boycott of Jewish businesses in Limerick organised by a local priest, declaring that

the Jew in Limerick has not been boycotted because he is a Jew, but because he is a usurer" and that "If Jews —as Jews— were boycotted, it would be outrageously unjust.

Griffith was apparently unaware that the Jews of Limerick had little or no involvement in moneylending or similar practices. The United Irishman also published articles by Oliver St. John Gogarty that contained antisemitic sentiments, which were common in the Ireland of the time.

George Noble Plunkett, father of Joseph Plunkett and member of various government cabinets, warned Taoiseach Eamon de Valera of the nefarious qualities and influence of Jews, which included claims about Jews' "inferior morality", that Jews were "responsible for World War I and were trying to destroy the papacy, controlled the press in various countries, published pornography", and were "very troublesome immigrants."

In 2022, Réada Cronin, a Sinn Féin TD for Kildare North, was criticized for a number of antisemitic tweets dating back nearly a decade, which included claims that Jews were "responsible for European wars", that Adolf Hitler was a "pawn of the Rothschilds", and that the Mossad was "influencing" British elections; Cronin apologized and received no further disciplinary action from Sinn Féin. According to The Jewish Chronicle, Chris Andrews, another Sinn Féin TD, appeared to suggest that Hitler may "not have been too far wrong," and liked social posts referring to Israelis as "murderous Zionist bastards;" Mick Wallace, an MEP who affiliates with The Left in the European Parliament, shared publications on social media that suggested Jews control the media, blamed Israel for the September 11 attacks and characterized Jewishness as a "tribal sociopathy".

In January 2026, a new survey commissioned by the New York-based Conference on Jewish Material Claims Against Germany, conducted online with 1,000 adults in Ireland, claimed that about half of Irish adults were unaware that six million Jews were murdered during the Holocaust, with substantial proportions underestimating the death toll, claiming to have never heard of the Holocaust, or believing it to be a myth. Specifically, 12% of respondents said they had never heard of the Holocaust or were unsure whether they had. The survey also revealed that many respondents, particularly younger adults, reported encountering Holocaust denial or distortion on social media, while 92% supported Holocaust education, and 88% such education in schools. These findings have prompted Jewish community representatives and educators to voice concern about gaps in public knowledge and the risk of Holocaust distortion. The rise of fascism and anti-Semitism in Germany, and the Holocaust itself, have been included in the history syllabus for Irish secondary school students for many years.

==== Catholic Church ====
Throughout the 20th century, several leading figures in the Catholic Church have promoted antisemitic beliefs and attitudes, and a number of leading Catholic newspapers and journals, including the Irish Catholic, the Catholic Bulletin, the Irish Mind, the Irish Rosary, and the Cross, carried what the historian Dermot Keogh has termed "radical anti-Jewish articles." Keogh singles out the Denis Fahey, professor of theology in the Holy Ghost Fathers' seminary at Kimmage, Dublin, and the Jesuit priest Edward Cahill, a close friend of de Valera. Fahey viewed the "Internationalisms of Jewry and Freemasonry" as the two great threats to consider; in his view, communism was "the most recent development in the age-long struggle waged by the Jewish Nation against the Supernatural Messias, our Lord Jesus Christ." Cahill considered Jews to be responsible for the "contamination" of western society as a result of their control over the presses, cinema, and banks of the major western countries.

On Passion Sunday 1932, John Charles McQuaid, the Primate of Ireland, Archbishop of Dublin, and a major political influence on Irish politics throughout much of the 20th century, delivered an antisemitic sermon to Blackrock College; in it, he denounced Jews on the grounds that

From the first persecutions till the present moment, you will find Jews engaged in practically every movement against Our Divine Lord and His Church. A Jew as a Jew is utterly opposed to Jesus Christ and all the Church means....by Satan we mean not only Lucifer and the fallen Angels, but also those men, Jews and others, who...have chosen Satan for their head.

He then went on to assert that the international press and Hollywood were controlled by the "Jew-enemy of our Saviour," that the Great Depression was "the deliberate work of a few Jew financiers," and that this and other schemes were all part of a larger plot to bring the world under the control of the "Jew-controlled League of Nations." In May 1949, McQuaid wrote to Chief Rabbi Immanuel Jakobovits to threaten the Jewish community in Ireland if the new state of Israel did not address Christian places of worship there to McQuaid's satisfaction; in his report on the matter to the Papal Nuncio, McQuaid asserted the morality of using as a weapon

that which most worries a Jew: the fear of reprisals.

Other noted antisemites in the Catholic Church of Ireland include John Creagh, whose sermons incited the Limerick Boycott, also known as the Limerick Pogrom. In his first sermon, delivered on 11 January 1904, Creagh discussed how the Jews had crucified Jesus Christ and cried out "His blood be upon us and all our children"; invoked the blood libel; said that "after sucking the blood of other nations," the Jews

...came to fasten themselves upon us like leeches, and to draw our blood...the question is whether or not we will allow them to fasten themselves still more upon us, until we and our children are the helpless victims of their rapacity.

and concluded

I do not hesitate to say that there is no greater enemies of the Catholic Church than the Jews.

== Northern Ireland ==
The location of Northern Ireland (dark green) in relation to the United Kingdom and the rest of Europe

The Jews of Northern Ireland have lived primarily in Belfast, where the Belfast Hebrew Congregation, an Ashkenazi Orthodox community, was established in 1870. Former communities were located in Derry and Lurgan. The first reference to Jews in Belfast dates from 1652, and a "Jew butcher" was mentioned in 1771, suggesting some semblance of a Jewish community at that time.

=== Belfast rabbinic lineage ===
The first minister of the congregation was Joseph Chotzner, who served at the synagogue which was located at Great Victoria Street from 1870 to 1880 and 1892 to 1897. Later spiritual leaders at the synagogue included Yitzhak HaLevi Herzog (1916–1919), who later become Chief Rabbi of Israel. His son Chaim Herzog, who became the 6th President of Israel, was born in Belfast. Rabbi John Ross, Rabbi Jacob Schachter and Rabbi Alexander Carlebach followed in this rabbinic lineage.

=== The Belfast Hebrew Congregation ===
In the 17th century, Jews reportedly lived in Ulster, the northern province of Ireland, most of which is now in Northern Ireland. A few records also note a Jewish presence during the 18th and early 19th centuries. In the 19th century as the pogroms in Russia and Poland increased, the Belfast Jewish population increased from 52 in the 1861 census, to 78 in 1881 and 273 in 1891. There was very little religious conversion but an interesting noble exception was the Countess of Charlemont. The Hon. Elizabeth Jane Somerville, born on 21 June 1834, was the daughter of William Somerville, 1st Baron Athlumney and Lady Maria Harriet Conyngham. She married James Molyneux Caulfeild, 3rd Earl of Charlemont, son of Hon. Henry Caulfeild and Elizabeth Margaret Browne, on 18 December 1856. Her mother-in-law was a favourite in Queen Victoria's court. As a result of her marriage, Hon. Elizabeth Jane Somerville was styled as Countess of Charlemont on 26 December 1863. Soon thereafter she attended synagogue services in Belfast and converted to Judaism. She died on 31 May 1882 aged 47, at Roxborough Castle, Moy, County Tyrone without issue. There were no Jews in Moy, so her initial exposure to Judaism is worthy of research.

Due to the influx of Russian and Polish Jews near the turn of the century, the Jewish community set up a board of guardians in 1893, a Hebrew ladies' foreign benevolent society in 1896, and a Hebrew national school in 1898 to educate their children. For a short time, there was a second Jewish synagogue, the Regent Street Congregation.

Sir Otto Jaffe and Lady Jaffe

Otto Jaffe, Lord Mayor of Belfast, was the life-president of the Belfast Hebrew Congregation and he helped build the city's second synagogue in 1904, paying most of the £4,000 cost. He was a German linen importer who visited Belfast several times a year to buy linen. He prospered and decided to live in Belfast. The synagogue he founded was located at Annesley Street, off Carlisle Circus in the north of the city where most Jews then lived. Subsequently, Barney Hurwitz, a prominent businessman in Belfast, was the president of the congregation for at least two decades. He was also a Justice of the Peace for many years and married Ceina Clein, of the well known Clein family of Cork City. Mrs. Ceina Hurwitz' first cousin Sara Bella Clein, also from that well known Cork family, married William Lewis Woolfson of Dublin, a member of a very prominent and numerous Dublin Jewish business family, whose many descendants are today spread all over the world including Ireland and Israel. The Clein family re-unions routinely were attended by up to 3,000 family members and in-laws.

During World War II, a number of Jewish children escaping from the Nazis, via the Kindertransport, and post-war Jewish orphans airlifted to Belfast from Prague reached and were housed in Millisle. The Millisle Refugee Farm (Magill's farm, on the Woburn Road) and was founded by teenage pioneers from the Bachad movement. It took refugees from May 1938 until its closure in 1948.

In 1901 the Jewish population was reported to be 763 people. In 1929, records show that 519 Jews had emigrated from Northern Ireland to the United States. In 1967, the population was estimated at 1,350; by 2004 this number had fallen to 130. It is now estimated to be around 70 to 80. The current membership of the Belfast Hebrew Congregation is believed to be as low as 80.

Gustav Wilhelm Wolff, a partner in Harland and Wolff in Belfast, came from a Jewish family that had converted to Protestantism. Harland and Wolff was the largest single shipyard in Britain and Ireland. Edward Harland bought the shipyard for $5,000 from Hickson and Co in 1860/61 with funds from a Liverpool Jewish investor, G.C. Schwabe. Schwabe sent his nephew Gustave Wilhelm Wolff to Belfast to oversee the investment and the company assumed the name Harland and Wolff the following year, 1862. Harland and Wolff built many large ships including the Titanic.

Well known Belfast Jews include: Ronald Appleton, crown prosecutor during The Troubles in Northern Ireland, who was elected President of the Belfast Hebrew Congregation and served in that post until he retired in 2008; Belfast actors Harold Goldblatt and Harry Towb; pioneer of modern dance in Northern Ireland Helen Lewis; and jazz commentator Solly Lipschitz.

== Demographics ==
According to the 2016 Irish census, Ireland had 2,557 Jews by religion in 2016, of whom 1,439 (56%) lived in its capital, Dublin. This number declined to 2,193 at the time of the 2022 Irish Census.

Historical Irish Jewish population
Year	Pop.	±%
1861	341	—
1871	230	−32.6%
1881	394	+71.3%
1891	1,506	+282.2%
1901	3,006	+99.6%
1911	3,805	+26.6%
1926	3,686	−3.1%
1936	3,749	+1.7%
1946	3,907	+4.2%
1961	3,255	−16.7%
1971	2,633	−19.1%
1981	2,127	−19.2%
1991	1,581	−25.7%
2002	1,790	+13.2%
2006	1,930	+7.8%
2011	1,984	+2.8%
2016	2,557	+28.9%
2022	2,193	−14.2%
Source: Info is from various Irish censuses (and enumerates Jews by religion); all-Ireland until 1911 and from 1926, only the 26 southern counties

Historical Northern Irish Jewish population
Year	Pop.	±%
2001	365	—
2011	335	−8.2%
2021	439	+31.0%

% population Jewish
Year	% Jewish
1891	0.04%
1901	0.09%
1911	0.12%
1926	0.12%
1936	0.13%
1946	0.13%
1961	0.12%
1971	0.09%
1981	0.06%
1991	0.04%
2002	0.05%
2006	0.05%
2011	0.04%
2016	0.05%
2022	0.04%

% of total Irish Jewish population living in Dublin (since 1891)
Year	% Jewish
1891	70.19%
1901	72.16%
1911	77.92%
1926	85.46%
1936	89.94%
1946	89.86%
1961	94.13%
1971	93.09%
1981	91.77%
1991	87.48%
2002	68.16%
2006	63.01%
2011	65.42%
2016	56.28%

== See also ==
- List of Irish Jews
- Little Jerusalem, Portobello for an account of Little Jerusalem.
- Chief Rabbis of Ireland
- Ireland-Israel relations
- Lebor Gabála Érenn
