= List of Irish Jews =

Jews have lived in Ireland for centuries. Notable individuals from the community include:

- Lenny Abrahamson, Irish film director
- Leonard Abrahamson (1896–1961), Gaelic scholar, who switched to medicine and became a professor, was born in Russia, grew up in Newry where he attended the local Christian Brothers school and lodged with the Nurock family in Dublin while studying at Trinity College Dublin
- Max Abrahamson, lawyer; author of "Engineering Law and the ICE(Institute of Civil Engineers) Contract" which became known worldwide as "the engineers' bible"
- William Annyas (Ãnes), Mayor of Youghal (1555) Marrano merchant
- Francis Annyas (Ãnes), Mayor of Youghal in 1569, 1576 and 1581, Youghal garrison commander and a spy for Francis Drake
- Philip Baker (1880–1932), Irish chess champion in 1924, 1927, 1928, and 1929
- Justice Henry Barron, Irish Supreme Court judge 1997-2003
- Leopold Bloom, fictional protagonist of Ulysses
- Louis Bookman (1890–1943), Irish international soccer and cricket player
- Michael Noyk, Irish Republican and solicitor during the Irish War of Independence
- Robert Briscoe, member of the Irish Republican Army during the Anglo-Irish War and twice Lord Mayor of Dublin (1956 and 1961)
- Ben Briscoe (son of Robert Briscoe), former Fianna Fáil T.D. and Lord Mayor of Dublin (1988)
- Joe Briscoe (son of Robert Briscoe), member of the Jewish Representative Council (predating Israeli Embassy) and Commandant in the Irish Army
- Michelle Citron, feminist film, video and multimedia producer, scholar and author
- Max Eager (son of George Eager), first Chief Rabbi of Ireland
- Elaine Feldman (1916–2006), co-founder of the first secondary school for the Jewish community in Dublin
- Maurice Freeman (1875–1951), Mayor of Johannesburg 1934/35
- Bob Geldof, singer-songwriter, actor and activist had a Jewish grandmother
- Gerald Goldberg, Lord Mayor of Cork in 1977
- Rabbi Yitzhak HaLevi Herzog, Chief Rabbi of Ireland from 1919 to 1937, later of the British Mandate of Palestine and Israel
- Chaim Herzog, sixth President of Israel and British World War II veteran, born in Belfast, raised in Dublin. During and after his service in the British Army, he was also known as "Vivian Herzog" ("Vivian" being the English equivalent of the Hebrew name "Chaim")
- Amy Huberman and Mark Huberman, actress and actor; their father was a Polish Jew
- Sir Otto Jaffe, Lord Mayor of Belfast (1899 and 1904)
- Immanuel Jakobovits, Chief Rabbi of Ireland between 1949 and 1958, later British Chief Rabbi
- Harry Kernoff, painter (1900–1974)
- Louis Lentin, director (documentary films, television, theatre)
- Ronit Lentin, Head of Sociology, director of the MPhil in Race, Ethnicity, Conflict, Department of Sociology and founder member of the Trinity Immigration Initiative, Trinity College Dublin
- Con Leventhal (1896–1979), lecturer, essayist, and critic
- June Levine, feminist, journalist and writer
- Maurice Levitas (1917–2001), (born Dublin) anti-fascist who took part in the Battle of Cable Street and fought in the International Brigades during the Spanish Civil War, and the father of Ruth Levitas
- David Marcus (1924–2009), author, editor, broadcaster and lifelong supporter of Irish-language fiction
- David Marcus, author and professor of Bible and ancient languages at The Jewish Theological Seminary
- Louis Marcus, documentary filmmaker
- Max Nurock, Israeli Consul-General to Australia, subsequently Israel's first Ambassador to Australia
- Yaakov Pearlman, Ireland's Chief Rabbi
- Alan Shatter, former Fine Gael TD for Dublin South and formerly Minister for Justice and Equality and Minister for Defence
- Bethal Solomons (1885–1965), medical doctor, Master of the Rotunda, Irish Rugby International
- Edwin Maurice Solomons (1879 – 22 April 1964) prominent businessman and first member of the Dublin stock exchange.
- Estella Solomons (1882–1968), landscape and portrait artist and member of Cumann na mBan
- Stella Steyn (1907–1987), Dublin-born artist
- Mervyn Taylor, former Labour Party T.D. and Minister for Equality and Law Reform
- Harry Towb (1925–2009), Stage and Screen actor, born in Larne, County Antrim
- Abraham Weeks (or Abraham Wix) was a London born conscientious objector, who had moved to Ireland to avoid conscription, who joined he Irish Citizens Army and was killed during 1916 Easter Rising (A Jewish comrade who joined on Easter Monday and died in action), Weeks had been assigned to the ICA Garrison in the GPO
- District Judge Hubert Wine, family court judge and prominent member of Dublin's Jewish community
