= Dolphins Barn Jewish Cemetery =

Burial place in Dublin, Ireland

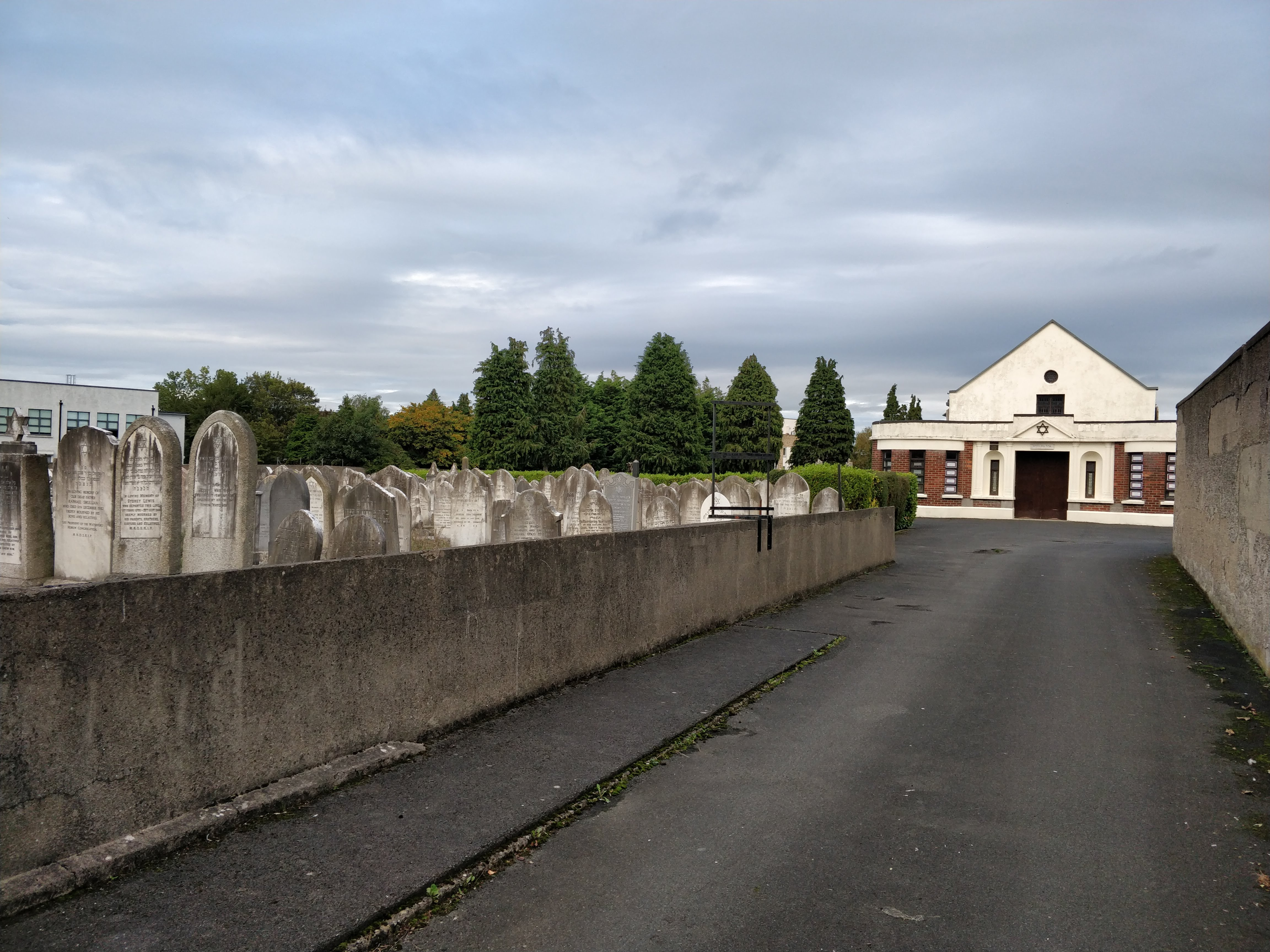
- Interactive map of Dolphins Barn Jewish Cemetery

Details
- Established: 1898
- Location: Aughavanagh Road, Dublin
- Country: Ireland
- Coordinates: 53.3290491°N 6.2876947°W
- Type: Jewish (Orthodox)
- Owned by: Dublin Jewish Holy Burial Society
- Find a Grave: Dolphins Barn Jewish Cemetery

Dolphins Barn Jewish Cemetery (Irish: Reilig Ghiúdach an Charnáin) is the principal Jewish burial place in Dublin, Ireland.

== History ==
The cemetery was established in 1898 by Robert Bradlaw, a dentist and prominent member of Dublin's Jewish community, who raised £300 in donations to set up a new chevra kadisha and the Dublin Jewish Holy Burial Society (HBS), founded in 1884. It was dedicated to financier and philanthropist Sir Moses Montefiore. It replaced Ballybough Cemetery in Fairview as the principal Jewish cemetery in Dublin.

== Location and facilities ==
The burial ground lies close to the South Circular Road, in the vicinity of which a large number of Jews lived, and is located near where the districts of Dolphin's Barn, Harold's Cross, Crumlin and Drimnagh meet. There is a prayer room on the site.

Dolphin's Barn is an Orthodox Jewish cemetery, and Dublin also has a Progressive Jewish burial place, Woodtown Progressive Jewish Cemetery, on Oldcourt Road, Rathfarnham, established in 1952.

== Burials ==
The cemetery's earliest burial is that of Ze'ev, son of Gedaliya Levi Goldring, who died on 6 September 1898. It contains one Commonwealth grave from World War II, that of Flight Lieutenant [Pilot] Maurice Donald Khan. The cemetery's founder, Robert Bradlaw, is also buried here.
