= Joseph Prag =

Joseph Prag (1859, Liverpool – 23 June 1929, London) was an English Jewish communal leader. He was educated at the Liverpool Institute and Queen's College. A leader in Zionist circles, Prag founded the English section of Hovevei Zion and frequently contributed articles on the emigration of Jews to Palestine. He was a member of the Anglo-Jewish Association, acted as its delegate to the International Conference on the Jews of Rumania in 1901, and served as treasurer of the Board of Jewish Deputies (as well as a member of its Committee on Palestine). Prag took an active part in arranging matters after the Limerick boycott of 1904.
