= Dublin Hebrew Congregation =

Jewish community in Dublin, Ireland

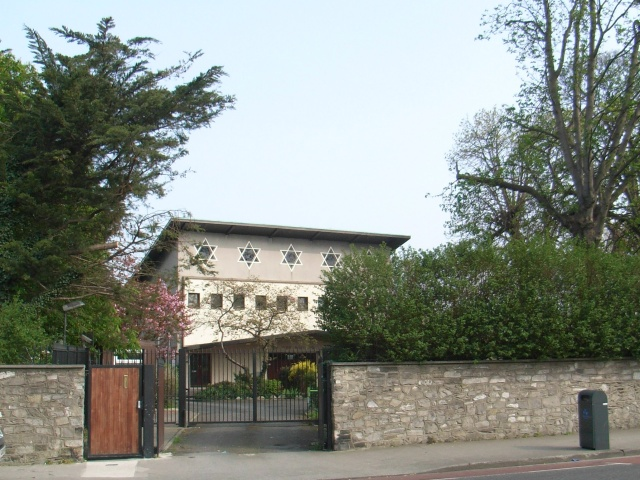
- The former synagogue in 2007

- Location of the former synagogue in Dublin

Religion
- Affiliation: Orthodox Judaism
- Rite: Nusach Ashkenaz
- Ecclesiastical or organizational status: Synagogue
- Status: Active

Location
- Location: 77 Terenure Road North, Terenure, Dublin
- Country: Ireland
- Interactive map of Dublin Hebrew Congregation
- Coordinates: 53°18′30″N 6°17′00″W

Architecture
- Architect: Wilfred Cantwell
- Type: Synagogue architecture
- Established: 26 September 1936 (as the Terenure Hebrew Congregation)
- Materials: Concrete

Website
- dublinhebrew.org

The Dublin Hebrew Congregation is an Orthodox Jewish congregation, with its synagogue at 77 Terenure Road North, not far from its long-operating synagogue at 32a Rathfarnham Road, both in Terenure, Dublin, Ireland.

The congregation was formed from a merger of two existing communities, begun in 1999 and completed in 2005.

== History ==
In 1892, a new headquarters for the Dublin Hebrew Congregation was established. The building was consecrated by Hermann Adler, Chief Rabbi of the British Empire, who declared "Ireland is the only country in the world which cannot be charged with persecuting Jews". The Adelaide Road congregation, with its base at 36-7 Adelaide Road, had built the Romanesque Revival synagogue in 1892.

The Terenure Hebrew Congregation was established at a meeting on 26 September 1936. The community aimed to provide services for members in the areas of Rathgar, Rathmines, and Terenure. The congregation rented rooms at 6 Grosvenor Place, Rathmines. In April 1940, the congregation purchased 52 Grosvenor Road. At Rosh Hashanah in 1948, the group moved to a Nissen hut at “Leoville”, Rathfarnham Road, Terenure, which had been donated to the congregation by Woulfe Freedman and violinist Erwin Goldwater. Construction of a new synagogue began in August 1952 and was dedicated on 30 August 1953. The Nissen hut became a function hall.

=== Fire ===
On 9 February 1966, the Terenure synagogue was set on fire. The synagogue was severely damaged, and several Siffrei Torah were destroyed. The Nissen hut was converted back into a synagogue so that no Shabbat services would be missed. On 26 May 1968, the congregation opened and dedicated the refurbished synagogue.

=== Merger and the 21st century ===
In January 1999, the Terenure Congregation and the Adelaide Road Congregation held extraordinary general meetings (EGMs) at which the members of both congregations agreed to begin the process of merging the congregations. The Adelaide Road Synagogue was sold and some proceeds of the sale were used to build a new mikveh and synagogue complex on the Terenure property. On 15 December 2004, the congregations held simultaneous EGMs and agreed to a complete merger. On 25 January 2005, the new Dublin Hebrew Congregation held its first council meeting.

The long-operating synagogue, which was located at 32a Rathfarnham Road, Dublin, was put up for sale in 2023. Sold, it was demolished in July 2026, with plans to build 60 apartments on the site having been approved on appeal in 2025. In the meantime, the community moved to new premises at 77 Terenure Road North, in another part of Terenure, during the first half of 2026.

== Burial grounds ==
Ballybough Cemetery, built in 1718, is the oldest Jewish cemetery in Ireland. As it reached capacity in the late 1800s, it was replaced by the current cemetery in Dolphin's Barn, administered by the Holy Burial Society. The new cemetery was established in 1898 by Robert Bradlaw who raised £300 in donations to set up a new chevra kadisha.

== See also ==
- History of the Jews in Ireland
