= John Creagh =

Irish priest (antisemite, missionary)

John Creagh CSsR
- Vicar Apostolic of Kimberley in Western Australia
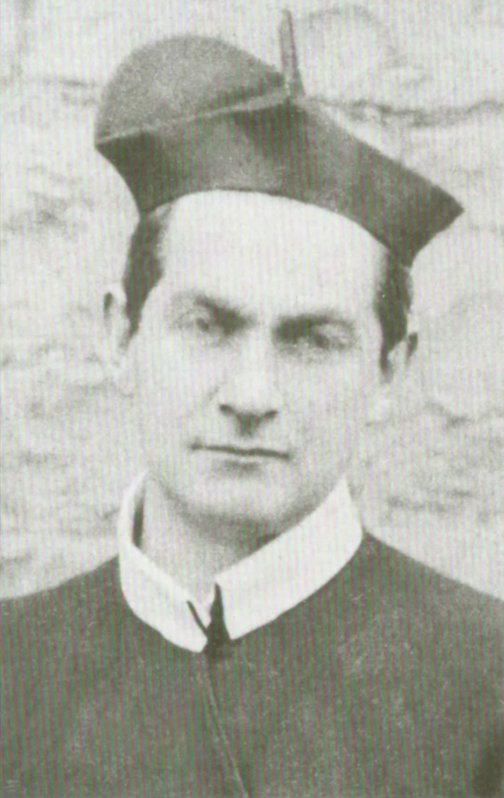
- Father John Creagh in 1904
- Church: Catholic Church
- See: Apostolic Vicariate of Kimberley in Western Australia
- In office: 1914 – 1922
- Predecessor: Fulgentius Torres
- Successor: Ernesto Coppo

Personal details
- Born: 1870 Thomondgate, County Limerick, United Kingdom of Great Britain and Ireland
- Died: 24 January 1947 (aged 76–77) Wellington, Dominion of New Zealand, British Empire

John Creagh, CSsR (1870 in Thomondgate, Limerick, Ireland – 1947 in Wellington, New Zealand) was an Irish Redemptorist priest. Creagh is best known for, firstly, delivering antisemitic speeches in 1904 responsible for inciting riots against the small Jewish community in Limerick, as well as, secondly, his work as a Catholic missionary in the Kimberley region of Western Australia between 1916 and 1922.

== Limerick boycott ==
Creagh played a significant role in launching the Limerick boycott of 1904–1906, in which many non-Jews economically boycotted, on an antisemitic basis, the small Jewish community in Limerick. The boycott was accompanied by antisemitic assaults and intimidation, and caused some Jews to leave the city. The boycott and associated events are sometimes referred to as the Limerick pogrom (a name derived, in part, from the Eastern European origins of many Jews in Limerick).

There had been a community of Irish Jews in Limerick City as early as 1790. A small number of Lithuanian Jews, fleeing persecution in their homeland, began arriving in Limerick in 1878. They formed an accepted part of the city's retail trade, and established a synagogue and a cemetery. From 1884, there was occasional and sometimes violent, antisemitic activity.

On Monday, 11 January 1904, Creagh, already a priest and Spiritual Director of the (lay) Arch Confraternity of the Sacred Heart, gave a speech at the Confraternity's weekly meeting at the Redemptorist Church at Mount Saint Alphonsus, attacking Jews in general. He repeated many historical myths about Jews, including that of ritual murder, and said that the Jews had come to Limerick "to fasten themselves on us like leeches and to draw our blood". Immediately after Creagh made his call for a boycott, according to historian Dermot Keogh, people left the church, passing "Colooney Street where most ... Jews lived... many [members of the crowd] were fired up by Creagh's [speech] ... The Jewish community ... [who may have] sensed the menacing mood of the crowd ... remained ... in their homes as [the crowd] ... passed ... Jewish shops, however, remained open and their owners felt menaced. One old Fenian ... single-handedly defended a shop ... until ... police arrived to mount a guard." While 300 people reportedly attacked "Jewish" businesses, few arrests were made. A 15-year-old youth was arrested and later imprisoned for a month, for throwing a stone at the local rebbe that hit him on the ankle. Once released, Raleigh was welcomed by a demonstration protesting that he was innocent and that his sentence had been too harsh.

The boycott was condemned by figures from across the political spectrum in Ireland and Creagh was criticised publicly by his Catholic superiors, who said that "religious persecution had no place in Ireland". An anonymous letter to the Redemptorists labelled Creagh a "disgrace to the Catholic religion". The Arch Confraternity did not regret the turn of events. At one of its meetings it passed a resolution: "We tender to Fr Creagh our very best wishes on his recent lectures on the ways and means of Jewish trading and at this meeting representing 6,000 members of the Confraternity we express our full confidence in his views."

According to a police report, five Jewish families, numbering 32 people, left Limerick due to the boycott and other, concurrent antisemitic activity, while another 26 families remained. The boycott appeared to accelerate a general decline in the numbers of Jews in Limerick. While the 1911 census suggested nine Jewish families new to the area had joined 13 families that had remained in Limerick, the Jewish population numbered only 122 people. By 1926, this number had declined dramatically, to just 30 people. Many descendants of Jewish families and individuals that left Limerick due to the boycott later became prominent in other parts of Ireland or overseas.

== Missionary ==
Creagh was moved briefly by his superiors to Belfast, and transferred as a missionary to the Philippines. There Creagh had a nervous breakdown in 1906. A year later he was posted to Wellington, New Zealand. By 1914, Creagh had been transferred to Australia. He was appointed, soon afterwards, as rector of the Redemptorist monastery in North Perth.

In 1915, A. O. Neville, Chief Protector of Aborigines in Western Australia, argued that the Catholic mission at Lombadina, in the Kimberley should be closed, because the property of 8,100 hectares (20,000 acres) belonged to a Filipino immigrant from Manila, Thomas Puertollano, who was married to a Catholic woman from the Aboriginal Bardi people and who was technically employing Aboriginal people. This was a breach of Australian law at the time.

Fr. Creagh's brief accordingly included safeguarding the mission from threats of closure from the government. Creagh's brother and a partner bought the land for £A 1,100, equivalent to A$127,200 in 2022, and the lease was transferred from Puertollano's name to that of Fr. Creagh's brother. Creagh, however, thought very highly of Puertollano, writing that he was "a man to whom I am under the greatest obligations. He was the former owner of Lombadina and for years he kept the Mission there going".

Following the outbreak of World War I, German Pallotine missionaries at Broome, in the Kimberley were interned. In May 1916, Creagh was appointed vicar apostolic at Broome to replace the Pallotines.

Creagh officially opened and blessed the Church of Christ the King in Beagle Bay, south of Lombadina, on the Feast of the Assumption in August 1918. He was also involved in supporting the work of the St John of God Sisters in the Broome area. He obtained regular salaries for the Sisters at the Japanese Hospital and had the Sisters put on the staff of the District Hospital where they undertook night duty. Creagh also built a beach house for the Sisters at Broome, located a few miles from town where there was a good water supply. A vegetable garden was planted and goats and poultry were kept, tended by a family from Lombadina. This small farm enterprise helped to supply the convent with fresh produce. In the early 1920s, before leaving Broome, Creagh authorised the Sisters to launch an appeal to purchase more land and build a new convent.

He was parish priest at Bunbury (1923–1925), Pennant Hills (1926–1930) and Waratah where he suffered a stroke. After recovering from the stroke, he spent the rest of his life conducting retreats and preaching. He was a member of the Redemptorist monastery at Hawker Road, Wellington, New Zealand and died at Lewisham Hospital – now Wakefield hospital – on January 24, 1947.

== Sources ==
- Fisk, Robert. In Time of War, Paladin: London, 1985. ISBN 0-586-08498-3
- Keogh, Dermot. Jews in Twentieth-Century Ireland, Cork; Cork University Press, 1998. ISBN 1-85918-150-3
- Keogh, Dermot, McCarthy, Andrew. Limerick Boycott 1904: Anti-Semitism in Ireland, Mercier Press, 2005. ISBN 978-1-85635-453-0
