= Jerome J. Collins =

Irish engineer, meteorologist, journalist and activist

Jerome J Collins
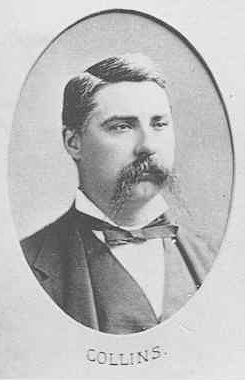

Personal details
- Born: October 17, 1841 Cork City, Ireland
- Died: October 30, 1881 (aged 40) Lena Delta, Russia
- Resting place: Curraghkippane Cemetery, County Cork
- Occupation: Meteorologist, Irish republican activist, journalist, civil engineer, Arctic explorer
- Known for: Founding Clan na Gael in the US, death in Jeannette expedition

Jerome J. Collins (1841–1881) was an Irish-American journalist, meteorologist and civil engineer, who was the founder of the Irish republican organization Clan na Gael in the United States. With the support of the Meteorology Department of the New York Herald, he became a meteorologist and correspondent in the ill-fated Jeannette Arctic Expedition, in which he died.

== Early life and Irish republicanism ==
Jerome Janus Collins was born on October 17, 1841, in Cork City, Ireland to Mark Collins, a lime and salt works owner, and his wife Elle. He was educated at St Vincent's Seminary in Cork, and eventually became a civil engineer. He was involved with the construction of Cork city's North Gate Bridge in 1864, before immigrating to London for other engineering work. Whilst in London he became involved in a plot to free Fenian Prisoners from Pentonville Prison using explosives. However, this plot was exposed and he had to flee to the United States in 1866. When he arrived he found the Fenian movement in America divided, so he created the Irish republican organization the Napper Tandy Club on the Irish rebel Wolfe Tone's birthday on June 20, 1867, in New York as common institution to unite the divided Fenian factions. This club soon grew into the large and influential Clan Na Gael.

Collins moved away from active involvement with Clan na Gael in the 1870s as it became more militant, but remained close to its leaders John Devoy and William Carroll. In 1877, as a possible war between Russia and the British Empires loomed, Collins sent a memorandum to St. Petersburg requesting that the Tsar's regime should aid Irish rebels against the British Empire. Devoy meanwhile ensured that the different factions of Fenians and Irish nationalists would be united to receive and act on Russian Military aid if received.

== Meteorology ==
Collins was employed at the New York Herald, first as a science reporter. Because of his keen interest in meteorology, he suggested using telegraphy information networks to help forecast weather. Starting in 1875, James Gordon Bennett appointed him "Clerk of the Weather", heading the Herald's Meteorology Department. Collins collected weather data across the United States and used it to predict weather systems moving across the Atlantic to Europe for Bennett's international newspaper empire in Europe. Collins was able to predict storm systems, but accuracy was low especially during the department's first year.

== The Jeannette expedition ==
James Gordon Bennett Jr., who had sponsored the successful Livingston expedition in order to gain press coverage in his papers, proposed financing a similar expedition to attempt to reach the North Pole using the Warm Kuro Siwo Current through the Bering Strait, as proposed by German Cartographer August Petermann. Contacted by American Naval Officer George W. De Long who was seeking backing for American Arctic expedition, Bennett purchased the British Naval vessel HMS Pandora, which had been updated for Arctic Exploration previously to search for survivors of the Franklin Expedition. At Bennett's request, Collins was appointed as meteorologist, correspondent and chief scientist for the expedition in charge of maintaining the various scientific apparatuses on the ship. With additional sponsorship the Pandora rechristened USS Jeannette left San Francisco on July 9, 1879, with De Long as commander.

Collins and De Long had a tense relationship. De Long being a naval man saw the civilians like Collins on the ship as "unnecessary accessories" and was incensed that he was not granted deference from the very independently spirited journalist, who he believed defied authority. Collins also received hostility from members of the crew for his Irish Catholic background. When the Jeannette became trapped in pack ice in September 1879, the tension between Collins and his commander grew, and in December 1880 Collins was relieved of his position by De Long for disrespecting orders.

After fifteen months trapped in the ice, in June 1881 the ship the crew evacuated the ship, which was being crushed, in three lifeboats. Collins and De Long shared a lifeboat. They landed near the Lena Delta on the Siberia cost.

== Death and legacy ==
The entire party eventually succumbed to exposure and hunger; De Long's diary, which was discovered with their remains by a later search party, notes that Collins died on October 30, 1881.

The Navy had the remains of Collins and other deceased crew transported back to the United States. They received a grand public funeral in New York on February 22, 1884, Collins body was returned to County Cork, Ireland and buried in Curraghkippane Cemetery in March 1884. His surviving brother, Daniel Collins, was angry when evidence of his brother's maltreatment by De Long was revealed in a congressional inquiry on the Jeannette disaster. Daniel Collins used influence to have a second congressional hearing in order to clear his brother's name, but the results of this upheld the findings of the earlier inquiry. On September 30, 1890, the US congress awarded Jerome J. Collins a Congressional Gold medal, along with the other officers, both living and dead, who had taken part in the expedition.
