= Lewis Wormser Harris =

Financier; first Jewish Lord Mayor of Dublin

Lord Mayor of Dublin (Died before taking office)

Personal details
- Born: 5 April 1812; Stuttgart, Germany
- Died: August 1, 1876 (aged 64); County Wicklow, Ireland
- Spouses: Caroline Picard (m. 1836–1855); Juliette Joseph (m. 1857)
- Children: 9

Lewis Wormser Harris (5 April 1812 – 1 August 1876) was an Irish bill-broker, financier, member of the Dublin Corporation and prominent member of the Dublin Hebrew Congregation. He was the first Jew elected Lord Mayor of Dublin, but died before he could take office.

== Background ==
Harris was born Samuel Wormser on 5 April 1812, to Isaac Samuel Wormser and Sheinle Ephraim, in Aldingen, near Stuttgart, Germany. He moved to Ireland in 1821, living in the residence of a Charles Harris, a watchmaker, and soon after adopted the surname Harris. He operated very successfully as a financier with offices in Suffolk Street, Dublin.

== Political career ==
In 1874, he was elected Alderman of Dublin Corporation representing the South Dock Ward, the first member of Dublin's Jewish community to hold such a position. In 1876 he was the first Jew elected as Lord Mayor; however, he died just before he was due to take up the office.

== Jewish community ==
On three occasions he was President of the Dublin Hebrew Congregation: 1847–1848, 1851–1852, and 1860–1863. In 1853, he was involved in the foundation of the synagogue in Stafford Street.

== Family ==
Harris was married twice, first to Caroline Ellen Picard (1817–1855). She was born Hendel b. Raphael Picard in Strasbourg, France. They married in 1836 and had four children.

After his first wife's death, Harris married Juliette Joseph (1821–1908) in 1857 with whom he had five children. Juliette died in Brighton in 1908 and was interred at Ballybough Cemetery, Dublin, one of the last people to be buried at that cemetery.

Harris' son Alfred Wormser Harris was also elected an Alderman for Dublin Corporation and like his father was President of the Dublin Hebrew Congregation from 1867 to 1873. In 1880 Alfred stood for election in Kildare as a Liberal.

== Death ==
Harris died on 1 August 1876 in Bray, County Wicklow.
