= Hubert Wine =

Irish Jewish leader

Hubert C. Wine (3 April 1922 – 15 November 2011) was an Irish solicitor, District Court judge, athlete and prominent member of the Irish Jewish community who served as the chairman of the Jewish Representative Council of Ireland for fourteen years.

Wine was educated at the Dublin Talmud Torah and Trinity College, Dublin, and was called to the bar. His family were antique dealers in Dublin. In his youth, Wine was an international table-tennis player, and won Irish singles and doubles championships. He worked alongside Mervyn Taylor with Herman Good Solicitors.

In 1976 Wine was appointed a District Judge in Dublin. In 1989 in the Dun Laoghaire District Court, he highlighted the situation caused by cutbacks whereby the health board was not providing suitable detention facilities for juvenile offenders by refusing to send a 13-year-old girl to detention in an adult facility.

Wine retired from the bench in 1992. He died in 2011.
