= Curraghkippane Cemetery =

13th-century churchyard and graveyard in County Cork, Ireland

- Reilig Churrach Cheapáin
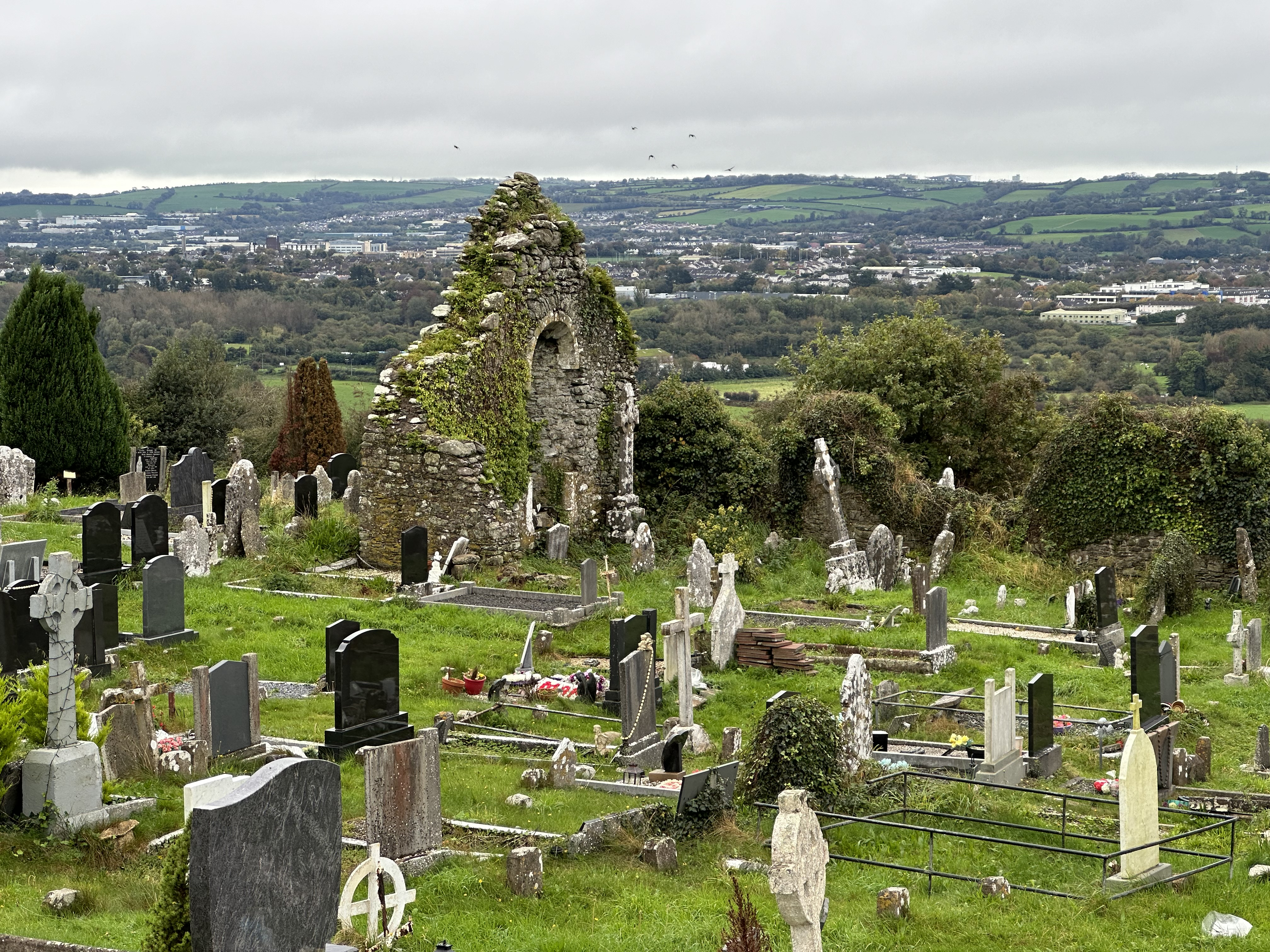
- Curraghkippane, view of the ancient chapel ruins
- Interactive map of Curraghkippane Cemetery

Details
- Location: Kerry Pike, Cork
- Country: Ireland
- Coordinates: 51.9043°N 8.5473°W

Curraghkippane Cemetery or Currykippane Cemetery (Irish: Reilig Churrach Cheapáin), also known as St Mary's Cemetery, is a cemetery in Clogheen in the Kerry Pike area west of Cork in Ireland. The cemetery site, in use since at least the medieval period, overlooks Carrigrohane and the western part of Cork city, the River Lee valley, and the eastern part of Ballincollig. The Curraghkippane name is a metonymy, as its meaning used to apply to the entire area on the hill, but was reduced to refer to the cemetery alone. The wider area, including the townland to the east inclusive of the cemetery, has been thereafter referred to as Mount Desert.

There are ruins of an old church on the cemetery, of which only the eastern gable and traces of a ringfort surrounding the structure remain. An ancient church at the site can be traced to 13th century, and it may have been destroyed and reduced to the current ruin as early as 17th century.

The first headstones are believed to have been erected in 1730, and among those buried in the graveyard are Edward O'Callaghan, a lieutenant of the British Navy who died in 1808, and Jerome Collins, an arctic explorer and meteorologist from Cork who died in 1881 but was buried only much later in 1884. While most headstones in Curraghkippane, as in many old graveyards, face east, that of Collins with a large Celtic cross faces North to commemorate his ill-fated expedition to the North Pole. Collins's funeral is believed to be "the longest funeral in history", while anecdotally also the shortest one took place in the same cemetery when a sexton from the little cottage located within the area of the graveyard died and was taken out of the window to be buried just a few meters away. Also buried here is Gerald Goldberg, the first Jewish Lord Mayor of Cork. Soldiers from the World War I, patients from the old Cork mental hospital, some passengers from the sunken ship Lusitania, and people who donated their bodies to medical research, are also buried here.

In 1885, the Cork Jewish Community purchased land adjacent to the old churchyard to consecrate for the Jewish Cemetery, and further expansion occurred in 1949. However, in the 1990s it became clear that the burial site would not be used fully, and the superfluous area was given to Cork County Council for the establishment of St Mary's Cemetery, Curraghkippane.

Due to its location and history, the Curraghkippane graveyard has given inspiration to several songs and poems.
