= Thomondgate =

Thomondgate is a district on the northside of Limerick city, Ireland. In times past the district was located at an important portal from the west of Ireland and the then Kingdom of Thomond (now County Clare) into the ancient City of Limerick, which was then confined to the Englishtown area of the city. Thomondgate was part of the "Northern" Liberties granted to Limerick in 1216. This area was the border between Munster and Connacht until County Clare, which was created in 1565, was annexed by Munster in 1602. Thomondgate is connected to Limerick by Thomond Bridge over the River Shannon.

The Treaty of Limerick following the 1690 Siege of Limerick is believed to have been signed in the area. The Treaty Stone on which it was signed is now standing on a pedestal at Clancy's Strand.

Today, Thomondgate is a mainly working class district of the city and has grown rapidly over the past years. Thomond Park stadium and TUS (formerly Limerick Institute of Technology) are located nearby.

St. Munchin's Church is located in the area at Clancy's Strand, overlooking the Shannon.
