= Gerald Goldberg =

Irish Jewish politician and activist; Lord Mayor of Cork

Gerald Yael Goldberg
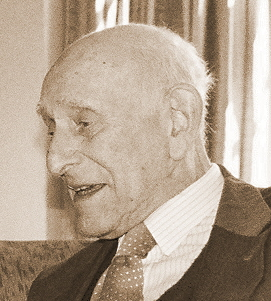
- Gerald Goldberg at his home, "Ben Truda", in Cork

Lord Mayor of Cork
- In office 1977–1978
- Preceded by: Seán French
- Succeeded by: Brian C. Sloane

Cork City Councillor
- In office 1967–1985

Personal details
- Born: 12 April 1912 Cork, Ireland
- Died: 31 December 2003 (aged 91) Cork, Ireland
- Party: Fianna Fáil
- Other political affiliations: Independent, Progressive Democrats
- Spouse: Sheila Beth Smith
- Children: 3

Gerald Yael Goldberg (12 April 1912 – 31 December 2003) was an Irish lawyer and politician who in 1977 became the first Jewish Lord Mayor of Cork. Goldberg was the son of Lithuanian Jewish refugees; his father was put ashore in Cork with other Jews and told that "Cork was the gateway to America."

== Early life ==
Goldberg was born in Cork, the 11th of 12 children to Lithuanian Jewish emigrants Louis and Rachel (née Sandler) Goldberg. His birth name was Yael or Yoel; the anglicised 'Gerald' was chosen for him by his sisters in infancy.

Goldberg's father was a peddler and shopkeeper, and his parents were both born in the small village of Akmenė (Yiddish: Akmian or אוקמיאַן) and part of a wave of immigrants who fled antisemitism in the Russian Empire at the end of the 19th century. In 1882, 14-year-old Louis set out from Riga, Latvia for the United States, but was unaware how far the journey was and went ashore when the boat arrived in Cobh. At the docks he encountered Isaac Marcus, who regularly met boats to see if any other Jews arrived needing help. In Cork, Louis was invited to stay with the Sandler family, coincidentally also from Akmian, where he met Rachel. They were married nine years later.

The Jewish population in southern Ireland was growing steadily. In 1862, there was one Jew in Limerick, 35 in 1888 and 130 in 1890. By 1900, there were 25 families from Lithuania who had settled in Limerick. Louis Goldberg was very well-educated, speaking multiple languages, but worked as a street peddler in Ireland, walking on foot all over the island, before eventually opening a drapery store. He was able to bring his mother and two brothers over. However, he was beaten during the 1904 Limerick boycott and his store boycotted, leading him to move his growing family to Cork.

Gerald Goldberg grew up in a Yiddish-speaking Orthodox home. The family were active Irish Republicans, dangerous due to raids by the Black and Tans. His father hung the wedding photo of Prince Edward and Princess Alexandra (later King Edward VII and Queen Alexandra) on the wall, which satisfied a British officer they were loyal to the crown. It was a similar trick they had used in Russia, when hanging photos of the Tsar to avoid harassment by Cossacks. During the First World War, his father worked as a jam-jar supplier.

Goldberg was interested in politics from a young age. He saw the bodies of both Lord Mayors of Cork Tomás Mac Curtain and Terence MacSwiney lying in state, which had a profound effect on him, as did the four times he saw Michael Collins speak.

Gerald was educated at the Christ Church National School (Church of Ireland) and the Cork Central Model School (Roman Catholic), before being sent with his brothers to a Macaulay College, a Jewish boarding school in Sussex, England, for a few years. The brothers eventually ran into trouble when they refused to take part in Armistice Day events on account of the deaths of Mac Curtain and MacSwiney, and were given three lashes in punishment. This incensed their father, who ordered them to return to Cork. Goldberg continued his education at Presentation Brothers College (PBC) in Cork and University College Cork, serving as president of the University Law Society. Earlier he was refused permission to speak at the UCC Philosophical Society, one of UCC's two debating societies (the other being the Law Society) because of his Jewish background. Goldberg received an LLB from UCC and received a Master of Arts degree from the university in 1968, along with an honorary doctorate in laws in 1993.

According to Goldberg's biographical entry in the Dictionary of Irish Biography, PBC's headmaster helped him to "overcome the reluctance of the Cork solicitors' firm Barry Galvin and Son to accept a Jewish apprentice." He reputedly attributed his choice of profession to familiarity with Talmudic law.

After qualifying as a solicitor in 1934, Goldberg had a career in Criminal Law practice in Cork for 63 years, once representing the noted Cork writer Frank O'Connor. He was the first Jewish president of the Incorporated Law Society of Ireland.

Goldberg had a long career as a solicitor, and retired in 1996. He served on the council of the Southern Law Association (the Cork city solicitors' governing body) and became vice‐president, but was not re‐elected to the council in the year he would have become president by rotation. According to his biography in the Dictionary of Irish Biography, this Goldberg ascribed this to anti-Semitism, and resigned from the association and "was on bad terms with it for many years."

During the Second World War he set up a committee to assist Jews fleeing Nazism, but encountered resistance from various arms of the government, which had discouraged Jewish immigration to Ireland during "The Emergency".

Goldberg served in the Douglas unit of the part‐time Local Defence Force during the 1939–45 emergency, and later claimed that Jews suffered discrimination within the force. The Goldbergs made contingency plans which proposed that, in the event of Nazi invasion, the Goldbergs' sons would be sent to live with friends and passed off as their own sons while privately bringing them up as Jews before sending them to US relatives. Although Goldberg was a Zionist and regularly visited Israel, he reportedly turned down several offers of positions in Israel, stating that he felt he "owed a debt to Cork for its hospitality".

Throughout his life Goldberg remained a believing and observant Jew; he was a cohen (descendant of the priestly tribe of Levi), which involved certain religious duties. In 1943 he was elected president of the Cork Hebrew Congregation, and remained the public face of Cork Jewry until his death; he served as cantor and occasionally taught Hebrew classes. His republican views led him to express the opinion that partition and the consequent severance of Belfast Jewry (which remained affiliated to the British rabbinate) had been damaging to Irish Jewry as a whole. Relations with the Dublin Jewish authorities, whom Goldberg always believed looked down on the Cork community, were sometimes fraught, as in April 1947 when, after one dispute, Goldberg withdrew the Cork representative from the Jewish representative council of Ireland.

== Political life ==
=== Early involvement and city councillor ===
As a student Goldberg attempted to join the Blueshirts but was refused on the grounds that only Christians were admitted; this, and experiencing anti‐semitism from some students, gave him a longstanding antipathy to Fine Gael. He was also critical of the Irish government for their refusal to let in more Jewish refugees throughout the World War II period.

He was elected an alderman to Cork Corporation as an independent in 1967. Goldberg unsuccessfully sought the mayoralty in 1970. He accused Patrick Cooney, the Minister for Justice, of condoning torture of those (mostly Irish republicans and other advocates of political violence) held under the Offences Against the State Act 1939 in 1974.

Goldberg was among those who condemned the speech in 1970 by Steve Coughlan, Mayor of Limerick, who made justifying references to the 1904 Limerick Boycott, which had forced Goldberg's family to flee Limerick for Cork, and had clashed with a previous Limerick Mayor on the same matter in 1951. Goldberg previously attended a symposium on the Limerick Boycott in 1965, which had also attracted local opposition, which faded during the reading of the first sermon of Father John Creagh, who along with other members of the clergy, including the local bishop, had motivated his Roman Catholic parishioners to carry out the 1904 boycott, for which one teenager, John Raleigh, was arrested.

He joined Fianna Fáil in 1970, stating that it was impossible for an isolated councillor to achieve anything on the corporation and that Fianna Fáil were the "most honest, progressive and united of the major parties".

=== Lord Mayor ===
In 1977–1978, by which time he had moved to representing the south‐east ward, he was elected Lord Mayor of Cork by the corporation. He was the first Jew to hold this office. He toured the United States as Lord Mayor where he was given the freedom of several cities including Philadelphia, New York and Dallas.

During his term he researched the history of the civic regalia, including the mayoral chain (he published a pamphlet on its connection with Terence MacSwiney) and the mace (leading him to make a public appeal for the British Museum to return to Cork several former Cork maces it had acquired over the years).

As Lord Mayor of Cork he was styled "The Rt. Worshipful, Lord Mayor Gerald Yael Goldberg of Cork". During his term of office he opened the Trinity pedestrian bridge. Named after an adjacent church, local wags nicknamed it "the Passover". The bridge is also close to the local synagogue on South Terrace, where he had been president, and is approximately a mile from Shalom Park, near the traditionally Jewish area of the city (Monarea Terrace).

His mayoralty was a source of pride to him, and he regarded his selection as a successor to MacCurtain and MacSwiney not just as recognition of his individual services but as proof that Cork rejected anti‐semitism and recognised him as "an Irishman and a Jew" (the title of a 1982 RTÉ television documentary about him which he scripted and presented).

== Author ==
Goldberg had an interest in history, especially local history of Cork, and published a number of books including The Adventurers of Cork; A History of the Jews of Cork and Johnathan Swift and contemporary Cork. He contributed the article on the Jews of Ireland in the Encyclopedia of Ireland and a chapter on Cork to the History of the Jews in Ireland.

== Later life ==
Following the Israeli invasion of Lebanon in 1982, he received death threats and the Cork synagogue was firebombed, the motivation of which he ascribed to unbalanced reporting in the media. He considered leaving Ireland, but chose to remain.

He blamed the Irish media for encouraging anti‐semitism by its Middle Eastern reportage, and openly accused himself of having "betrayed my Jewish heritage" through his attachment to Cork, though this attachment "later reasserted itself". He retired from Cork Corporation in 1985.

In 1986, after his retirement from active politics, Goldberg criticised Charles Haughey's leadership of FF and was one of the early defectors from Fianna Fáil to the Progressive Democrats.

In 1998, he defended the extent of the Vatican apology for The Holocaust issued by Pope John Paul II, in contrast to the disappointment expressed by many prominent Jews such as Israeli Chief Rabbi Yisrael Meir Lau. Goldberg noted Pope Pius XII's stated fear of the consequences of excommunicating Nazis for their persecution of Europe's Jews, saying "These things must be brought to an end, we must put them behind us. Could the man have said more?" Goldberg's life was featured in an RTÉ documentary, An Irishman, a Corkman and a Jew.

He married his wife Sheila Beth Smith (who predeceased her husband), a member of a well known Northern Jewish family, in Belfast in 1937 and they lived their married lives at "Ben Truda" on Cork's Rochestown Road. Their house was a "gathering place for students, artists and intellectuals". He collected antiques, and the extent of the collection was highlighted in an auction in 2004 that included pictures, bronzes, antique furniture, silver, porcelain and glass.

According to the Dictionary of Irish Biography, Goldberg's relationship with his wife was "close and loving, cemented by shared artistic and charitable interests".

In 1964, Goldberg was honoured by the National Association of Claimants Attorneys of America and in 1987 he received a life membership of the Royal Dublin Society. For much of his life he was active in various sporting codes, and was goalkeeper to the Cork Jewish soccer team "well into middle age". As a young man he was active in the Scouting Association of Ireland, through which he met his wife. He was a freemason, joining the Cork Harmony lodge in 1938. The writer and journalist David Marcus (1924–2009) was his nephew.

He was a patron of the arts, who assisted (amongst others) Aloys Fleischmann (qv) and Joan Denise Moriarty (qv). He had a fine private art collection, including glass, ceramics, silver, antique furniture and a large library of Hebrew books. Over the years he presented works of art to many Cork institutions, including Christian Brothers' College, the Augustinian church, and the Cork School of Music. In 1964 he was a government appointee to the board of the National Gallery of Ireland and he was extensively involved, as patron and donor, with Cork's Crawford Art Gallery (where the Goldbergs founded the practice of holding lunchtime concerts). Until his death he remained president of the Cork Orchestral Society. Shortly before his death Goldberg donated his library to University College Cork.

Goldberg had served on the board of governors of the National Gallery of Ireland and reportedly had one of the largest private Jewish libraries in Ireland. As a patron of the arts he was involved with the Cork Orchestral Society, Irish Theatre Ballet and Irish National Ballet and the lunchtime concerts in the Crawford College of Art and Design. He was said to have been delighted at the announcement that Cork had become the European Capital of Culture in 2005.

== Death ==
In his latter years he tutored students of Irish-Jewish history from University College Cork in his home. He died at the age of 91 at Cork's Marymount Hospice. His sons John, Theo and David survived him.

He received a civic funeral to the Cork Jewish graveyard at Curraghkippane on 4 January 2004; Cork City Council members wore skullcaps in his honour.

Civic offices
| Preceded by Seán French | Lord Mayor of Cork; 1977 | Succeeded by Brian C. Sloane |
