= Dolphin's Barn =

Inner suburb of Dublin, Ireland

Dolphin's Barn An Carnán (Irish)
- Suburb
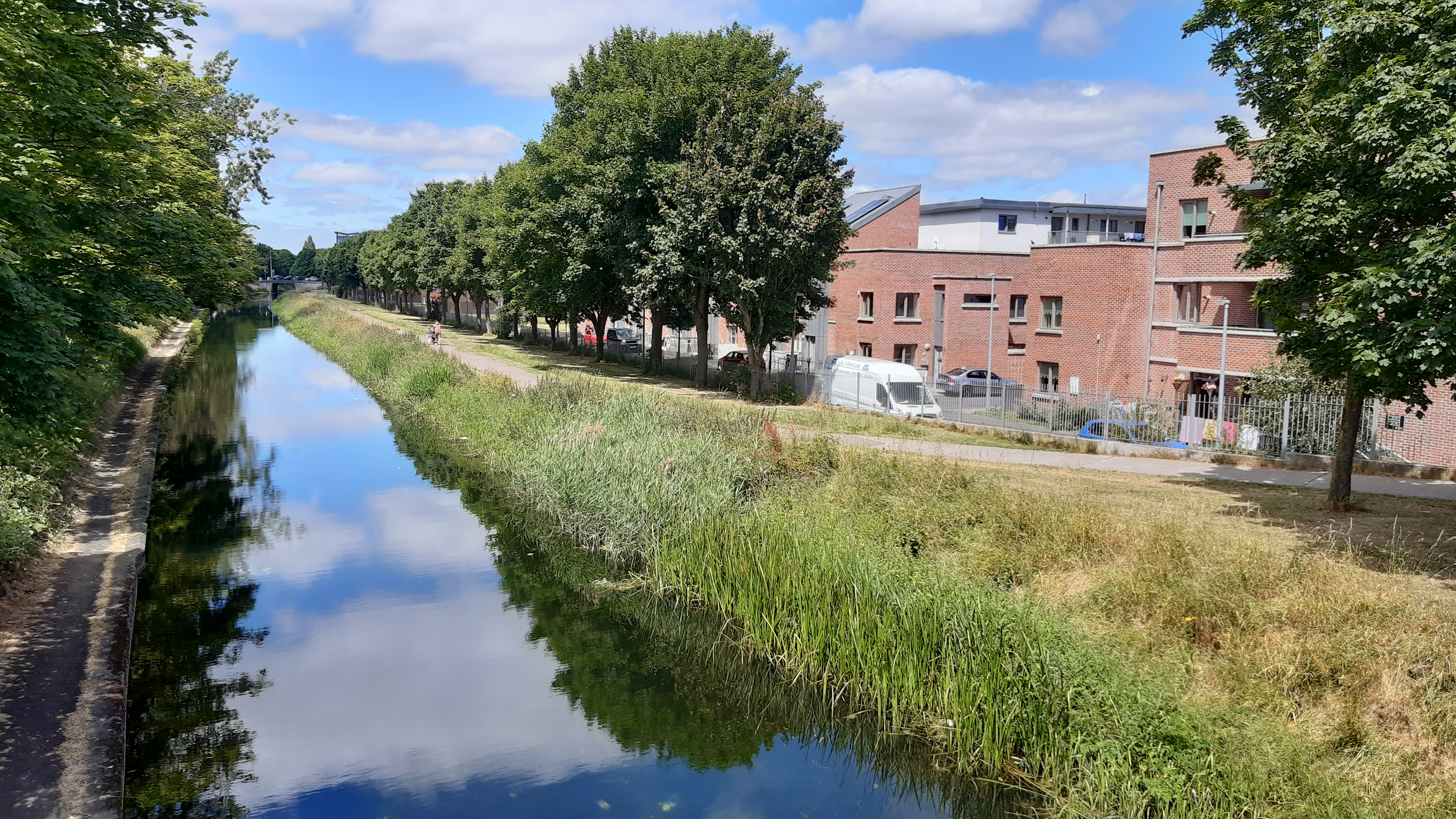
- The Grand Canal passing through Dolphin's Barn

- Location in Ireland
- Coordinates: 53°19′53″N 6°17′38″W
- Country: Ireland
- Province: Leinster
- County: Dublin
- Local Authority: Dublin City Council
- Eircode routing key: D08, D12

Dolphin's Barn (Irish: An Carnán, meaning 'the (small) cairn or mound') is an inner suburb of Dublin, Ireland, situated on the Southside of the city in the Dublin 8, and partially in the Dublin 12 postal district.

== Etymology ==
The district's English name may derive from an Anglo-Norman family named Dolphyn who owned a storehouse there in medieval times. However it could also derive from its more ancient name of Carnán Cluana Úi Dhunchada (the little cairn of the meadow of the Úi Dhunchada) or its shortened version of Carn Úi Dhunchada (the cairn of the Úi Dhunchada), anglicised as "Dunphy's Cairn" and ending as "Dolphin's Barn". The Úi Dhunchada were one of the three branches of the Úi Dúnlainge dynasty from which came most of the Kings of Leinster from the 5th to the 11th century AD.

== Location and access ==
Surrounding areas include The Liberties, Inchicore, Islandbridge, Kilmainham and Crumlin.

== History ==
The Grand Canal passes through the centre of the locality under Dolphin's Barn Bridge. The City Watercourse historically passed through the area to get to the City Basin.

In 1958, the first branch of Irish music retailer Dolphin Discs was established in the suburb, later branching into a record label named Dolphin Records.

== Sport ==
Dolphin's Barn is the home of Templeogue Synge Street GAA who own Dolphin Park and a local hurling and camogie club called Kevin's Hurling Club who have promoted Gaelic games in the area since 1902. Former League of Ireland club Dolphin FC also previously used the grounds.

The Dublin marathon passes down South Circular Road in Dolphin's Barn.

== Amenities ==
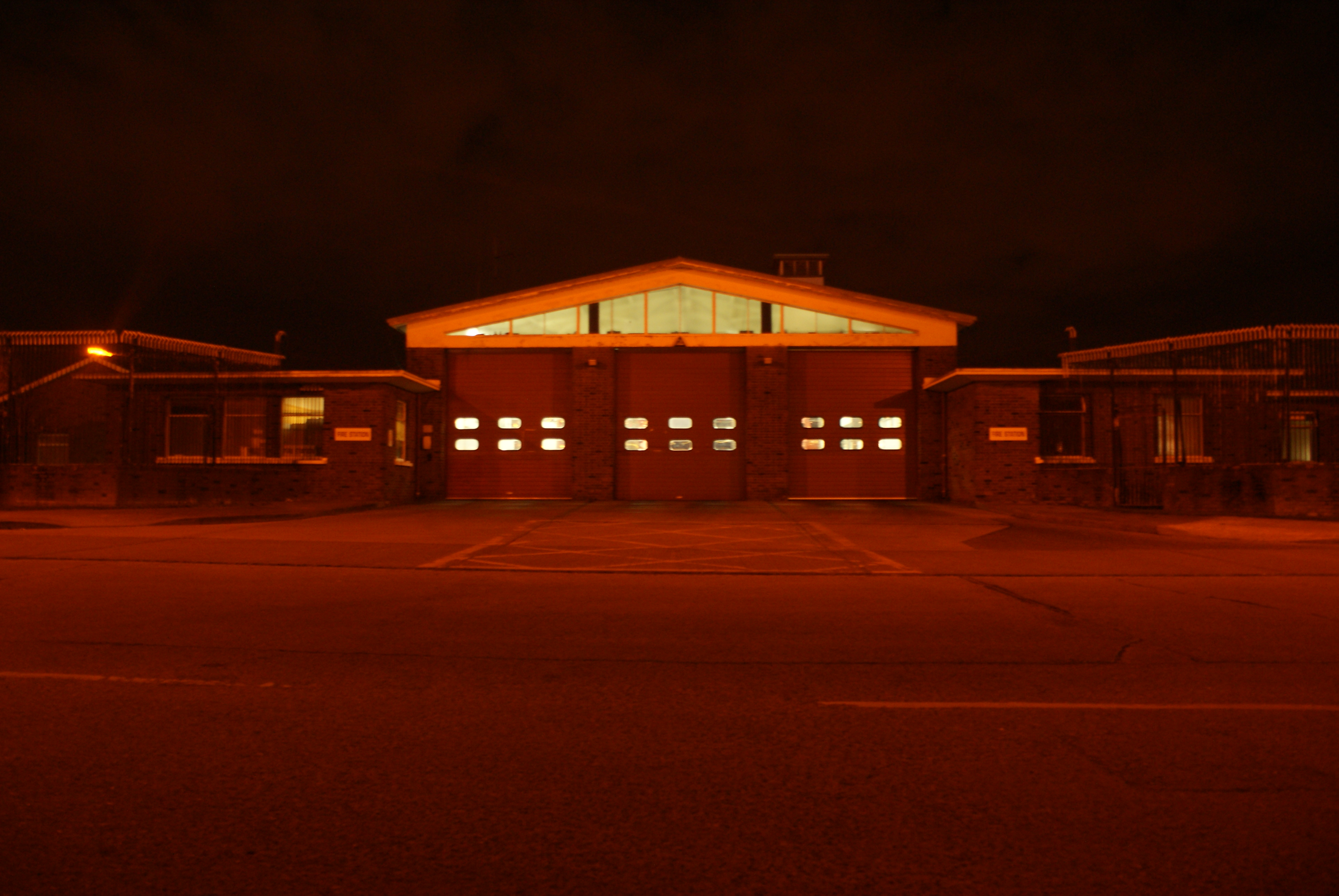
Dolphin's Barn Fire Station at night

Dolphin's Barn is home to one of the city's fire stations which is situated on the corner of Parnell Road and Rutland Avenue.

=== Jewish cemetery ===
The official Jewish cemetery of Dublin is on Aughavannagh Road near Dolphin's Barn. It was established in 1898 by Robert Bradlaw and the Dolphin's Barn Jewish Burial Society to replace the Ballybough Cemetery which was nearing capacity. Bradlaw was one of the founders of the St. Kevin's Parade Synagogue. The cemetery was dedicated to Sir Moses Montefiore.

=== Hospital ===
The Coombe Lying-In Hospital moved from the Liberties to modern buildings in Dolphin's Barn in 1967. It was renamed the Coombe Women's Hospital in 1993 and again renamed as the Coombe Women & Infants University Hospital in January 2008.

=== Dolphin House flats ===
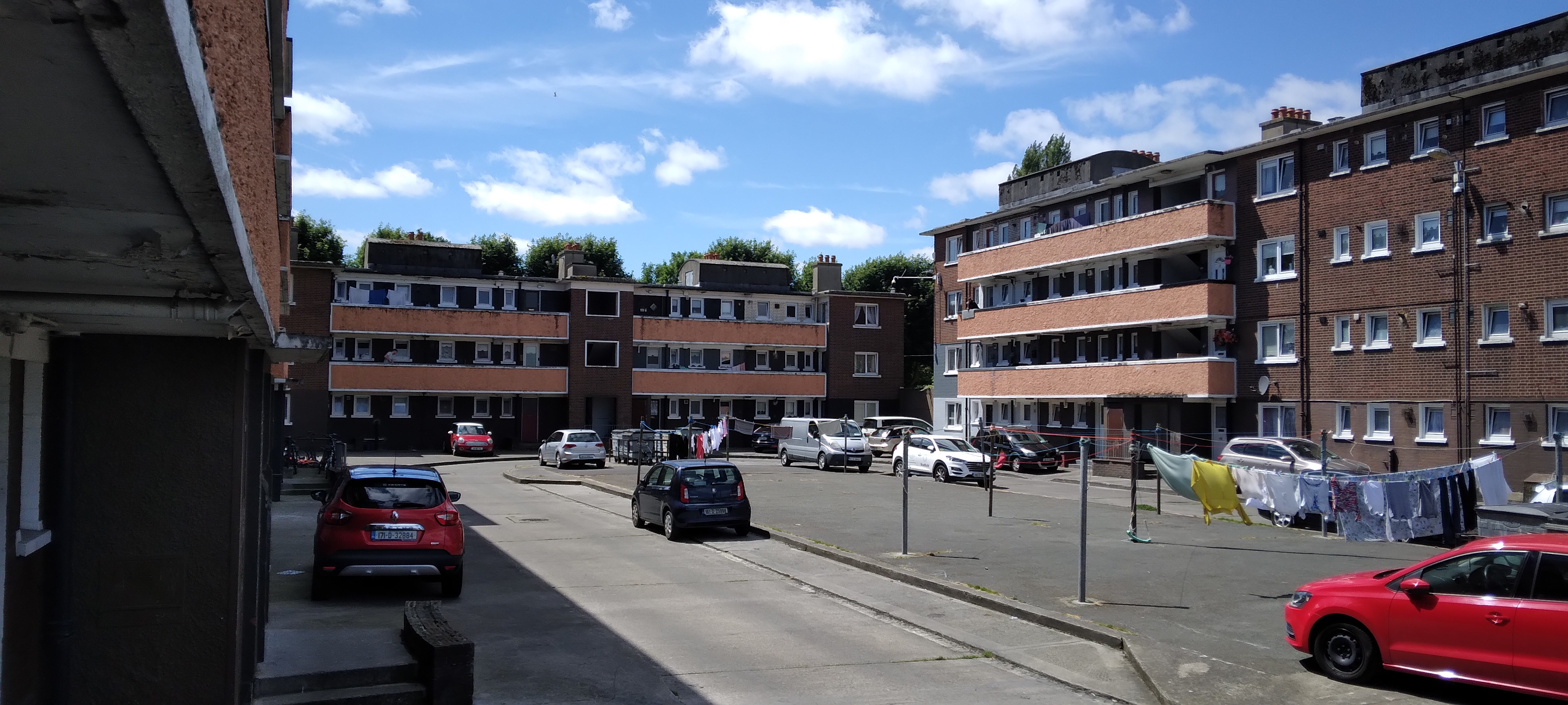
One of the courtyards in the Dolphin House complex

A group of brutalist flats called Dolphin House are located in Dolphin's Barn. They were constructed in 1957 and comprise 392 flats. It is Dublin’s largest remaining public housing flat complex and, as of 2023, was going through a regeneration project by Dublin City Council.

== See also ==
- List of towns and villages in Ireland.
