= Robert Bradlaw =

Dublin-based dentist and Jewish community leader

Robert Bradlaw (born Reuven Brudno; 22 February 1840 – ?) was a dentist and prominent Jewish leader in Dublin, Ireland.

== Background ==
Bradlaw was born Robert Brudno in Smorgon, Belarus on 22 February 1840. He moved to England in 1867 and then to Dublin, Ireland, in 1880. He died on 27 February 1904 aged 64.

== Community work ==
Bradlaw was active in the Dublin Jewish community and was affectionately nicknamed "the prince of the immigrants". He established a synagogue at 7 St. Kevin's Parade in 1883 and a new chevra kadisha and cemetery at Dolphin's Barn in 1898, replacing the Ballybough Cemetery. The Jewish Chronicle reported that Bradlaw formed the synagogue to break away from the Dublin Hebrew Congregation which had reportedly denied him membership. He obtained donations of £300 to fund the chevra. Bradlaw participated in the foundation ceremony for the opening of Adelaide Road Synagogue in 1892.

== Family ==
Bradlaw's grandson, Professor Robert Vivian Bradlaw (1905–1992), was a renowned dentist who founded the Faculty of Dental Surgery of the Royal College of Surgeons of England and served as Dean of the Eastman Dental Hospital from 1959 to 1970. His son-in-law Dr George Selig Wigoder was a Talmudic scholar.

He was married to Hannah Robinson (Rubenstein), housewife and helper of the poor. She died in November 1906, aged 64.
