= Edwin Maurice Solomons =

Edwin Maurice Solomons (1879 – 22 April 1964) was a prominent figure in Irish Jewry and international business. He was the first member of the Dublin stock exchange.

== Personal life ==
He was born in Dublin, Ireland to a prominent Jewish family, one of the oldest Jewish families in Ireland. The family moved to Ireland from England in 1824. Bethel Solomons was the son of Maurice Solomons (1832–1922), an optician whose practice is mentioned in James Joyce's novel Ulysses, His mother, Rosa Jacobs Solomons (1833–1926), was born in Hull in England.

Edwin's brother, Bethel Albert Herbert Solomons (27 February 1885 – 11 September 1965), was an Irish medical doctor and an international rugby player for Ireland and supporter of the 1916 Rising. His sister Estella Solomons (1882–1968) was a leading artist, and a member of Cumann na mBan during the 1916 Rising; she married poet and publisher Seumas O'Sullivan. His younger sister Sophie was a trained opera singer.

Solomons was a former president of the Dublin United Hebrew Congregations and of the Jewish Representative Council of Eire.

== Career ==
He traveled extensively in Latin America, mostly in oil-rich countries such as Mexico and Venezuela, promoting oil and commodities trade, along with Jewish cultural exchange.
