= London Protocol (1877) =

1877 treaty between Russia and the United Kingdom

The London Protocol was signed on 21 March 1877 between Russia and the United Kingdom. The Russians agreed not to establish any client states in case they attained victory in the looming Russo-Turkish War. In return, the British agreed to remain neutral in any conflict between the Ottoman Empire and Russia. The agreement was an effort to maintain a balance of power in the Balkans and to avoid intervention by the other Great Powers. Russian attempts to create a large Bulgaria in the Treaty of San Stefano led to the British withdrawal from the Protocol and threatened military intervention, quieted only by the Congress of Berlin.
