= Mervyn Taylor =

Irish politician and lawyer (1931–2021)

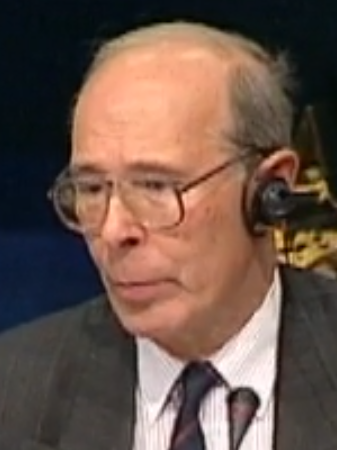
- Taylor in 1996

Minister for Equality and Law Reform
- In office 15 December 1994 – 26 June 1997
- Taoiseach: John Bruton
- Preceded by: Máire Geoghegan-Quinn
- Succeeded by: John O'Donoghue (Justice, Equality and Law Reform)
- In office 12 January 1993 – 17 November 1994
- Taoiseach: Albert Reynolds
- Preceded by: New office
- Succeeded by: Máire Geoghegan-Quinn

Teachta Dála
- In office June 1981 – June 1997
- Constituency: Dublin South-West

Personal details
- Born: 28 December 1931 Dublin, Ireland
- Died: 23 September 2021 (aged 89) Dublin, Ireland
- Party: Labour Party
- Spouse: Marilyn Fisher (m. 1962)
- Children: 3
- Education: Trinity College Dublin

Mervyn Taylor (28 December 1931 – 23 September 2021) was an Irish Labour Party politician who served as Minister for Equality and Law Reform from 1993 to 1994 and from 1994 to 1997. He served as a Teachta Dála (TD) for the Dublin South-West constituency from 1981 to 1997. He was the first ever Jewish cabinet minister in Ireland.

== Early life ==
Taylor was born to a Jewish family in Dublin. He was educated at Zion School in Rathgar, Wesley College, Dublin and Trinity College Dublin. He later qualified as a solicitor.

== Legal practice ==
He worked for Herman Good Solicitors, alongside Herman Good and future district judge Hubert Wine. Good's involvement in the Labour Party was instrumental in Taylor getting involved in politics. Taylor later established his own firm of Taylor and Buchalter Solicitors with Don Buchalter, and practised as a solicitor for over 50 years before retiring from active practice in his 70s. He continued as a consultant to the firm of Taylor and Buchalter Solicitors for most of his 70s.

== Politics ==
Taylor was elected to Dublin County Council in the 1970s, and became cathaoirleach of the council. He was elected to Dáil Éireann as a Labour Party Teachta Dála (TD) for Dublin South-West at the 1981 general election, on his third attempt. He then held the seat at every election until his retirement from politics in 1997.

He was Chairman of the Labour Party from 1987 to 1991, and Labour chief whip, from 1981 to 1988. He was assistant government chief whip from 1981 to 1982, and again from 1982 to 1987.

Taylor was a strong supporter of Israel, an unpopular cause in the Labour Party.

== Minister for Equality and Law Reform ==
Taylor served two periods as Minister for Equality and Law Reform, in the 1993-94 Government under Taoiseach Albert Reynolds, and the 1994-97 Government under Taoiseach John Bruton.

=== 1993–1994 Government ===
In January 1993, he was appointed to the newly created position of Minister for Equality and Law Reform in the Fianna Fáil–Labour coalition government led by Albert Reynolds as Taoiseach.

Legislation introduced by Taylor and enacted during his initial term of office included the Interpretation (Amendment) Act 1993 – providing for gender inclusive language in Acts of the Oireachtas, the Jurisdiction of Courts and Enforcement of Judgments Act 1993, the Stillbirths Registration Act 1994, Maintenance Act 1994 and the Maternity Protection Act 1994 extending maternity rights.

=== 1994–1997 Government ===
Labour resigned from government in November 1994, and from December 1994 it was part of a new coalition government of Fine Gael, Labour and Democratic Left formed without a new election, dubbed the Rainbow government, led by John Bruton as Taoiseach. Taylor was again appointed as Minister for Equality and Law Reform.

In 1995 Taylor was in charge of the government proposal to legislate to remove the prohibition of divorce from the constitution; he steered the relevant bills through Dáil Éireann and Seanad Éireann. The subsequent referendum was approved by a margin of 0.5 per cent. In the course of the campaign he survived criticism of the measure directed at his Jewish faith, as well as a Supreme Court ruling that public monies could not properly be spent in promoting the government's opinion on a referendum proposal.

=== Measures introduced by Taylor and enacted by the subsequent Dáil ===
Taylor also introduced two wide-ranging anti-discrimination measures: the Employment Equality Bill and the Equal Status Bill. These were struck down by the Supreme Court but revised versions were approved by the Government in the final months of Taylor's term of office, and were ultimately published and enacted during the following Dáil term.

== Family and personal life ==
Taylor was married to Marilyn Taylor (née Fisher), who is the author of numerous books for young people. They had two sons, a daughter, and eight grandchildren. Their younger son, Gideon, is chief executive officer of New York's Jewish Community Relations Council and of the Jewish Restitution Successor Organization and is adjunct professor of law at Fordham University in New York City.

== Death and legacy ==
Taylor died on 23 September 2021, aged 89. Tributes to Taylor were led by President of Ireland, Michael D. Higgins, describing him as "one of the most gracious, unselfish and kindest members ever to serve in the Dáil". Stephen Collins, former political editor for The Irish Times, described him as "a rarity in politics, a quiet man who avoided any hint of flamboyance yet made a substantial impact on the State he served during an important time of social change".

A collection of Mervyn Taylor's papers from his time as the Minister for Equality and Law Reform is held at the National Library of Ireland.

Political offices
New office	Minister for Equality and Law Reform; 1993–1994	Succeeded by Máire Geoghegan-Quinn
Preceded by Máire Geoghegan-Quinn	Minister for Equality and Law Reform; 1994–1997	Office abolished Department merged with Department of Justice
Party political offices
Preceded by Michael D. Higgins	Chairperson of the Labour Party; 1987–1991	Succeeded by Niamh Bhreathnach

Dáil	Election	Deputy (Party)	Deputy (Party)	Deputy (Party)	Deputy (Party)	Deputy (Party)
13th	1948	Seán MacBride (CnaP)	Peadar Doyle (FG)	Bernard Butler (FF)	Michael O'Higgins (FG)	Robert Briscoe (FF)
14th	1951	Seán MacBride (CnaP)	Peadar Doyle (FG)	Bernard Butler (FF)	Michael ffrench-O'Carroll (Ind.)	Robert Briscoe (FF)
15th	1954	Seán MacBride (CnaP)	Peadar Doyle (FG)	Bernard Butler (FF)	Michael O'Higgins (FG)	Robert Briscoe (FF)
15th	1956 by-election	Seán MacBride (CnaP)	Noel Lemass (FF)	Bernard Butler (FF)	Michael O'Higgins (FG)	Robert Briscoe (FF)
16th	1957	James Carroll (Ind.)	Noel Lemass (FF)	Bernard Butler (FF)	Michael O'Higgins (FG)	Robert Briscoe (FF)
16th	1959 by-election	James Carroll (Ind.)	Noel Lemass (FF)	Richie Ryan (FG)	Michael O'Higgins (FG)	Robert Briscoe (FF)
17th	1961	James Carroll (Ind.)	Noel Lemass (FF)	Richie Ryan (FG)	James O'Keeffe (FG)	Robert Briscoe (FF)
18th	1965	John O'Connell (Lab)	Noel Lemass (FF)	Richie Ryan (FG)	Joseph Dowling (FF)	Ben Briscoe (FF)
19th	1969	John O'Connell (Lab)	Noel Lemass (FF)	Seán Dunne (Lab)	Joseph Dowling (FF)	4 seats 1969–1977
19th	1970 by-election	John O'Connell (Lab)	Noel Lemass (FF)	Seán Sherwin (FF)	Joseph Dowling (FF)	4 seats 1969–1977
20th	1973	John O'Connell (Lab)	Noel Lemass (FF)	Declan Costello (FG)	Joseph Dowling (FF)	4 seats 1969–1977
20th	1976 by-election	John O'Connell (Lab)	Brendan Halligan (Lab)	Declan Costello (FG)	Joseph Dowling (FF)	4 seats 1969–1977
21st	1977	Constituency abolished. See Dublin Ballyfermot				

Dáil	Election	Deputy (Party)	Deputy (Party)	Deputy (Party)	Deputy (Party)	Deputy (Party)
22nd	1981	Seán Walsh (FF)	Larry McMahon (FG)	Mary Harney (FF)	Mervyn Taylor (Lab)	4 seats 1981–1992
23rd	1982 (Feb)	Seán Walsh (FF)	Larry McMahon (FG)	Mary Harney (FF)	Mervyn Taylor (Lab)	4 seats 1981–1992
24th	1982 (Nov)	Seán Walsh (FF)	Michael O'Leary (FG)	Mary Harney (FF)	Mervyn Taylor (Lab)	4 seats 1981–1992
25th	1987	Seán Walsh (FF)	Chris Flood (FF)	Mary Harney (PDs)	Mervyn Taylor (Lab)	4 seats 1981–1992
26th	1989	Pat Rabbitte (WP)	Chris Flood (FF)	Mary Harney (PDs)	Mervyn Taylor (Lab)	4 seats 1981–1992
27th	1992	Pat Rabbitte (DL)	Chris Flood (FF)	Mary Harney (PDs)	Mervyn Taylor (Lab)	Éamonn Walsh (Lab)
28th	1997	Pat Rabbitte (DL)	Chris Flood (FF)	Mary Harney (PDs)	Conor Lenihan (FF)	Brian Hayes (FG)
29th	2002	Pat Rabbitte (Lab)	Charlie O'Connor (FF)	Seán Crowe (SF)	Conor Lenihan (FF)	4 seats 2002–2016
30th	2007	Pat Rabbitte (Lab)	Charlie O'Connor (FF)	Brian Hayes (FG)	Conor Lenihan (FF)	4 seats 2002–2016
31st	2011	Pat Rabbitte (Lab)	Eamonn Maloney (Lab)	Brian Hayes (FG)	Seán Crowe (SF)	4 seats 2002–2016
31st	2014 by-election	Pat Rabbitte (Lab)	Eamonn Maloney (Lab)	Paul Murphy (AAA)	Seán Crowe (SF)	4 seats 2002–2016
32nd	2016	Colm Brophy (FG)	John Lahart (FF)	Paul Murphy (AAA–PBP)	Seán Crowe (SF)	Katherine Zappone (Ind.)
33rd	2020	Colm Brophy (FG)	John Lahart (FF)	Paul Murphy (S–PBP)	Seán Crowe (SF)	Francis Noel Duffy (GP)
34th	2024	Colm Brophy (FG)	John Lahart (FF)	Paul Murphy (PBP–S)	Seán Crowe (SF)	Ciarán Ahern (Lab)
