= Limerick boycott =

Early 20th century antisemitic boycott

The Limerick boycott, also known as the Limerick pogrom, was an economic boycott waged against the small Jewish community in Limerick, Ireland, between 1904 and 1906. It was accompanied by assaults, stone throwing and intimidation, which caused many Jews to leave the city. It was instigated in 1904 by a Redemptorist priest, Father John Creagh. According to a report by the Royal Irish Constabulary, five Jewish families left Limerick "owing directly to the agitation" while another 26 families remained.

== Background ==
There were seven Jews living in Limerick City in 1790. Census returns record one Jew in Limerick in 1861. This doubled by 1871 and doubled again by 1881. Increases to 35, 90 and 130 are shown for 1888, 1892, and 1896 respectively. A small number of Lithuanian Jewish tradespeople, fleeing persecution in their homeland, began arriving in Limerick in 1878. They formed an accepted part of the city's retail trade, centred on Colooney Street (now Wolfe Tone Street). The community established a synagogue and a cemetery in the 1880s. Easter Sunday of 1884 saw the first of what were to be a series of sporadic violent antisemitic attacks and protests. The wife of Lieb Siev and his child were injured by stones and her house damaged by an angry crowd for which the ringleaders were sentenced to hard labour for a month. In 1892 two families were beaten and a stoning took place on 24 November 1896.

In 1903, a reception was held in Limerick to mark the emigration of Bernard Wienronk to South Africa. The former Mayor of Limerick John Daly was asked to preside. He proposed a toast on the night to "Israel a Nation". Many details about Limerick's Jewish families are recorded in the 1901 census that shows most were pedlars, though a few were described as drapery dealers and grocers.

== Events ==
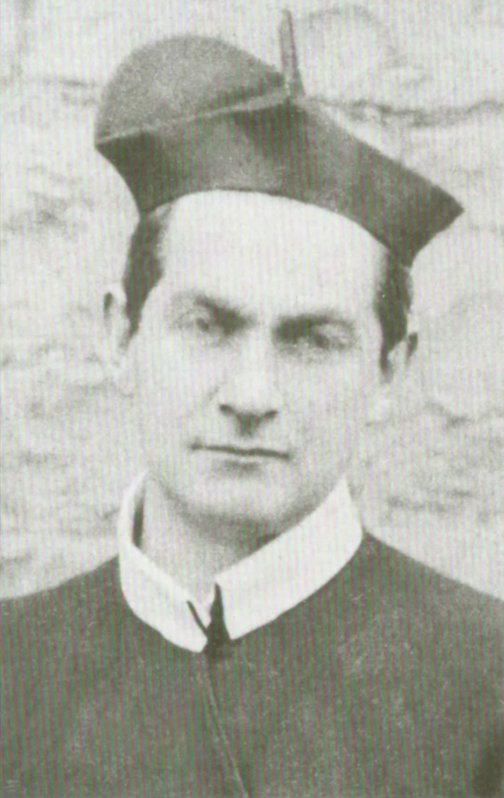
John Creagh, who incited the boycott

In 1904 Father John Creagh, a Redemptorist and Spiritual Director of the Arch Confraternity of the Sacred Heart, gave a sermon at their weekly meeting attacking Jews. He repeated many antisemitic conspiracy theories, including that of ritual murder, and said that the Jews had come to Limerick "to fasten themselves on us like leeches and to draw our blood". Dermot Keogh describes what happened after Creagh delivered his lecture calling for a boycott on 11 January 1904.

Collooney Street (now named Wolfe Tone Street), where most Limerick Jews lived, was only a few minutes' walk from the Redemptorist church. The hundreds who left the church after the meeting had to pass the top of Colooney Street on their way home; many were fired up by Creagh's incendiary sermon. The Jewish community immediately sensed the menacing mood of the crowd turned mob, and remained locked in their homes as the church militants passed by. Jewish shops, however, remained open, and their owners felt menaced. One old Fenian – a member of the confraternity – single-handedly defended a shop from attack until the police arrived to mount a guard.

John Raleigh, a teenager (15 years of age), was arrested and incarcerated in Mountjoy Prison for one month for throwing a stone at the rabbi (which struck him on the ankle). Once released he returned home to a welcoming throng who were protesting that the teenager was innocent and that the sentence imposed was too harsh. While in prison Raleigh was called a "Limerick Jew slayer" by a warder, but Raleigh, who claimed he was innocent, was insulted by this and reported the incident to the chief warder.

Later, after 32 Jews had left Limerick due to the boycott, Creagh was disowned by his superiors, who said that "religious persecution had no place in Ireland". There was a voice of opposition among the local population which was expressed in an anonymous letter to the Redemptorists labelling Creagh a "disgrace to the Catholic religion".

The economic boycott of the Jewish community lasted over two years. It is sometimes referred to as the "Limerick pogrom"; Dermot Keogh suggests that this derives from the experience of Lithuanian Jews in their homeland, and was used even though no one was killed or seriously injured in Limerick. Limerick's Protestant community, many of whom were also traders, supported the Jews at the time, but despite this five Jewish families (numbering 32 persons) left the city because of the boycott. Some went to Cork, intending to embark on ships from Cobh to travel to America.

== Aftermath ==
Some of the families that left Limerick due to the boycott were the Ginsbergs, the Jaffés (to Newcastle), the Weinronks (to South Africa), and the Goldbergs (to Leeds). The Goldberg family ended up leaving Leeds and settling in Cork. Gerald Goldberg, a son of this migration, became Lord Mayor of Cork in 1977, and the Marcus brothers, David and Louis, grandchildren of the boycott, became hugely influential in Irish literature and Irish films respectively. Among the Jaffé family that left Limerick due to the boycott was Henry Jaffé, the grandfather of the journalist and popular historian Simon Sebag Montefiore, and of his brother Hugh. But Montefiore's great-great-grandparents Benjamin and Rachel remained in Limerick and were living in Catherine St. in 1911 along with his great-grandparents Marcus and Leah, who at this time employed two local Roman Catholics who were resident at the same address. Marcus Jaffé, who was a dentist, was still practising in Limerick in 1925. The boycott was condemned by many in Ireland, among them the influential Standish O'Grady in his paper All Ireland Review, depicting Jews and Irish as "brothers in a common struggle". The Land Leaguer Michael Davitt, author of The True Story of Anti-Semitic Persecutions in Russia in the Freeman's Journal, attacked those who had participated in the riots and visited homes of Jewish victims in Limerick. His friend, Corkman William O'Brien MP, leader of the United Irish League and editor of the Irish People, had a Jewish wife, Sophie Raffalovic. Arthur Griffith, who founded the Sinn Féin party in 1905, supported the boycott, advocating shunning Jewish-owned businesses in the city. He also said

If Jews—as Jews—were boycotted, it would be outrageously unjust. But the Jew in Limerick has not been boycotted because he is a Jew, but because he is a usurer. And we deny that we offend against ethics by most heartily advocating the boycott of usurers, whether they be Jew, Pagan or Christian.

Father Creagh was moved by his superiors initially to Belfast and then to an island in the Pacific. In 1914, he was promoted by the Pope to be Vicar Apostolic of Kimberley, Western Australia, a position he held until 1922. He died in Wellington, New Zealand in 1947. Since 1983, several commentators have questioned the traditional narrative of the event, and especially whether the event's description as a pogrom is appropriate. Historian Dermot Keogh sympathised with the use of the term by the Jews who experienced the event, and respected its use by subsequent writers, but preferred the term "boycott". Creagh's antisemitic campaign, while virulent, did not result in the end of Limerick's Jewish community. The 1911 census records that, not only were 13 of the remaining 26 families still resident in Limerick six years later, but that nine new Jewish families had joined them. The Jewish population numbered 122 persons in 1911 as opposed to 171 in 1901. After the Irish Free State left the United Kingdom in 1922, this number declined to just 30 by 1926.
