= William Annyas =

Irish mayor

William Moses Annyas Eanes was an Irish politician who in 1555 was elected mayor of Youghal in County Cork. He was the first Jew to hold such an elected position in Ireland. His grandfather was a Converso Jew who had emigrated from Belmonte, Portugal.
