= Dermot Keogh =

Irish academic (1945–2023)

Dermot Keogh (12 May 1945 – 6 September 2023) was an Irish historian. He was Professor of History and Emeritus Jean Monnet Professor of European Integration Studies at University College Cork. Keogh died on 6 September 2023, at the age of 78.

== Bibliography ==
- Keogh, Dermot (2007). "The Catholic Church, the Holy See and the 1916 Rising". In Gabriel Doherty (ed.). 1916 : the long revolution. Cork: Mercier Press. pp. 250–309.
- Church and Politics in Latin America ISBN 0-312-02815-6
- Ireland and Europe, 1919 - 1948 ISBN 0-389-20803-5
- Ireland and the Vatican:The Politics and Diplomacy of Church-State Relations 1922-1960 ISBN 0-902561-96-0
- Jews In Twentieth Century Ireland:Refugees, Anti-Semitism and the Holocaust ISBN 1-85918-150-3 (Awarded the 1999 James S. Donnelly Sr Prize by the American Conference for Irish Studies in the history/social science category)
- The Rise of the Irish Working Class:The Dublin Trade Union Movement and Labour Leadership 1890-1914 ISBN 0-904651-75-4
- Twentieth Century Ireland:Nation and State ISBN 0-7171-1624-7
- The Vatican, the Bishops and Irish Politics 1919-1939 ISBN 0-521-30129-7
