= Ballybough Cemetery =

Jewish cemetery in Dublin, Ireland

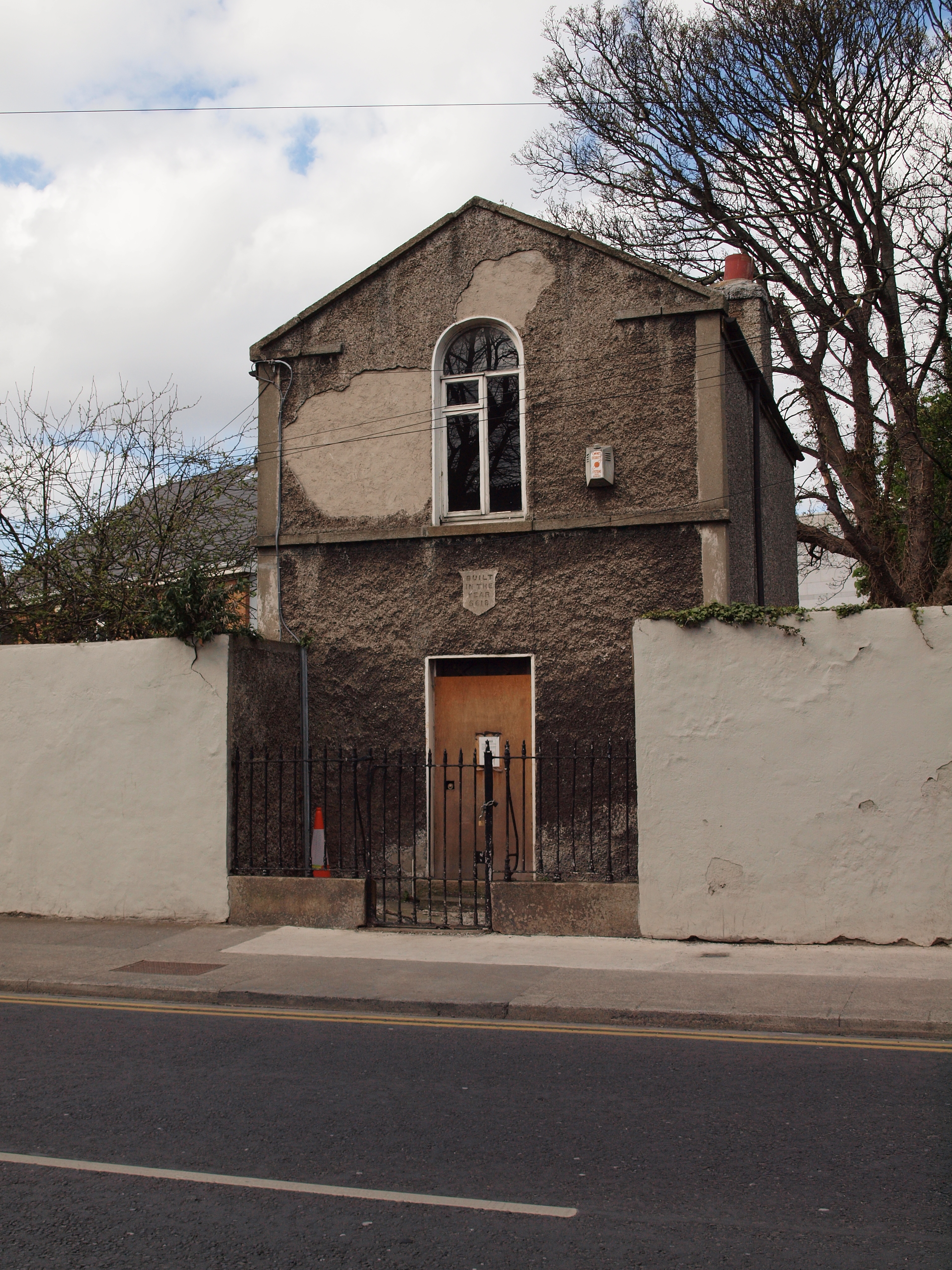
- Ballybough Cemetery gate lodge, April 2020
- Interactive map of Ballybough Cemetery

Details
- Established: 1718
- Closed: 1958
- Location: 65 Fairview Strand, Ballybough, Dublin 3
- Country: Ireland
- Coordinates: 53°21′45″N 6°14′29″W
- Type: Jewish
- Size: 935 m^{2} (10,060 sq ft)
- Find a Grave: Ballybough Cemetery

Ballybough Cemetery (Irish: Reilig an Bhaile Bhoicht) is a Jewish cemetery in Ballybough, Dublin. Founded in 1718, it is Ireland's oldest Jewish cemetery.

== Location ==
The cemetery is bounded on one side by a former Royal Irish Constabulary barracks (1830–1910). On the other side is the site of Elrington House, the 1748 home of John Dioderici (also referred to as Deoderice or Dioderice), maternal grandfather of the Provost of Trinity College Dublin, Bishop Thomas Elrington.

== History ==
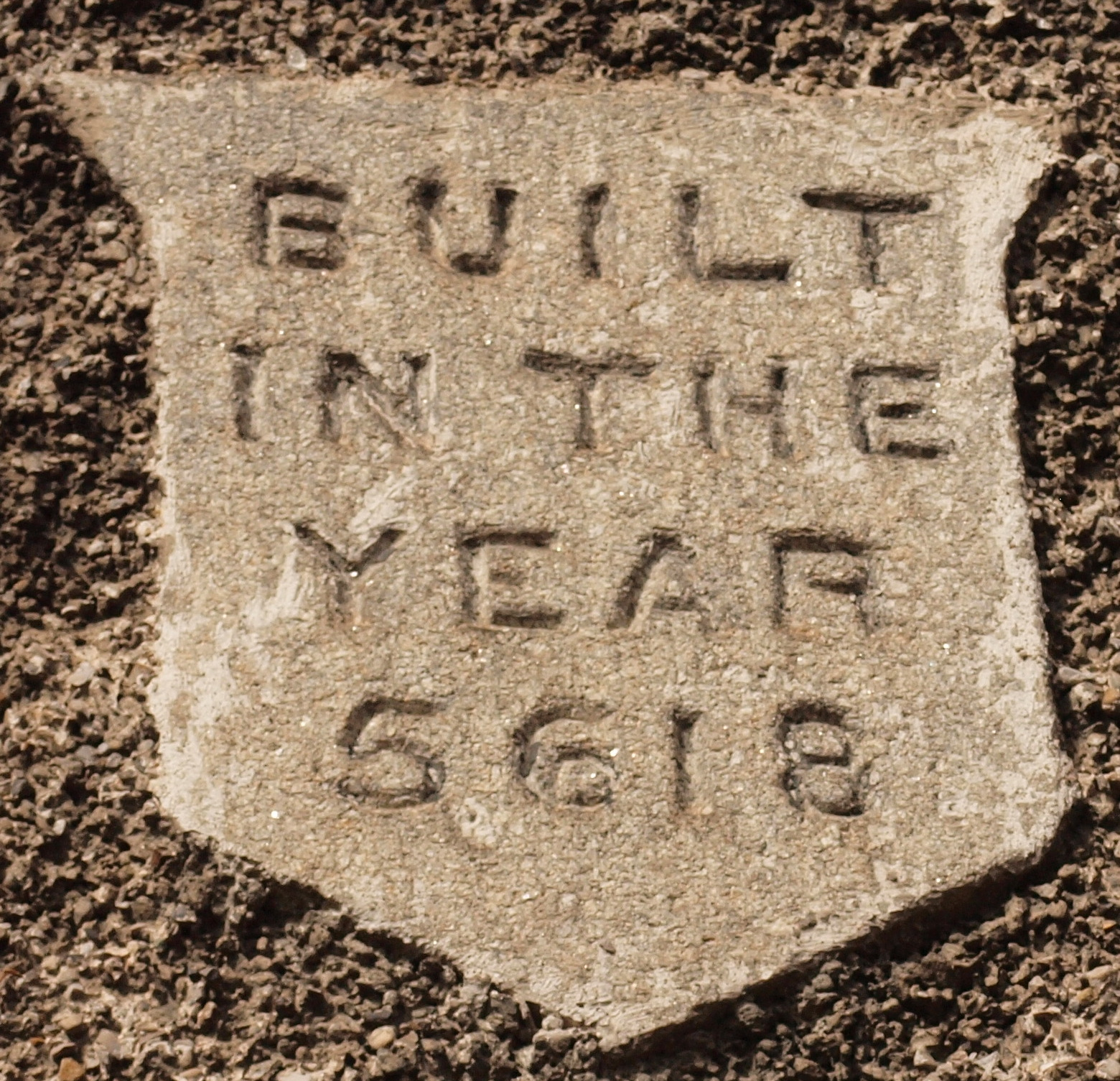
Gate lodge date inscription (indicating AD 1857)

In the 1700s, a small number of Jews settled in the Annadale area off Ellis Avenue (what is now Philipsburg Avenue), Fairview; most of these marrano Jews came from Spain and Portugal (with some coming from the Netherlands), escaping the Inquisition.

On 28 October 1718, Alexander Felix (David Penso), Jacob Do Porto, and David Machado Do Sequeira, on behalf of the Ashkenazim, leased from Captain Chichester Phillips of Drumcondra Castle (an MP in the Irish Parliament) a plot of land on which the graveyard was subsequently built.

The Jewish community sought assistance from German and Polish Jews in London to build a wall around the cemetery. They were refused but were later supported by the Bevis Marks Synagogue, which not only funded the wall but provided a supervisory agent from London. The title deeds for the cemetery were deposited at Bevis Marks Synagogue, where they remained as of 1906.

A mortuary chapel was added in 1857 (inscribed on the front is "Built in the Year 5618", following the Hebrew calendar). The cemetery itself contains more than 200 graves, the last burial there having taken place in 1958. Most of Dublin's Jewish community would be buried in Dolphins Barn cemetery now.

According to Diarmuid G. Hiney, "the taking of headstones and some of the bodies in fact, was quite an ordinary occurrence" in the cemetery. A 1913 account in Life in Old Dublin by James Collins recounts that some headstones were stolen from the cemetery by locals:

The Jews have now two burial grounds within our city one at Harold's Cross (lately established), the older one at Fairview. There were formerly a great number of tombs visible in this graveyard, but some have disappeared in a somewhat extraordinary manner. It is told in Whitlaw's and Walsh's History of Dublin, " That they have been stolen at different times for the purpose of converting them into hearth-stones or other uses," and in support of this theory the following evidence is given :—A Jew a short time ago (this is in 1818), paid a visit to a Christian friend in the neighbourhood of Ballybough, whom he found in the act of repairing his house. Examining his improvements he perceived near the fireplace a stone with a Hebrew inscription which intimated to the astonished Israelite that the body of his father was buried in the chimney.

A comprehensive history of the cemetery titled "The Jewish Cemetery at Ballybough in Dublin City" was delivered by Bernard Shillman on 6 July 1925 at the Jewish Historical Society of England.

== Decline and refurbishment ==
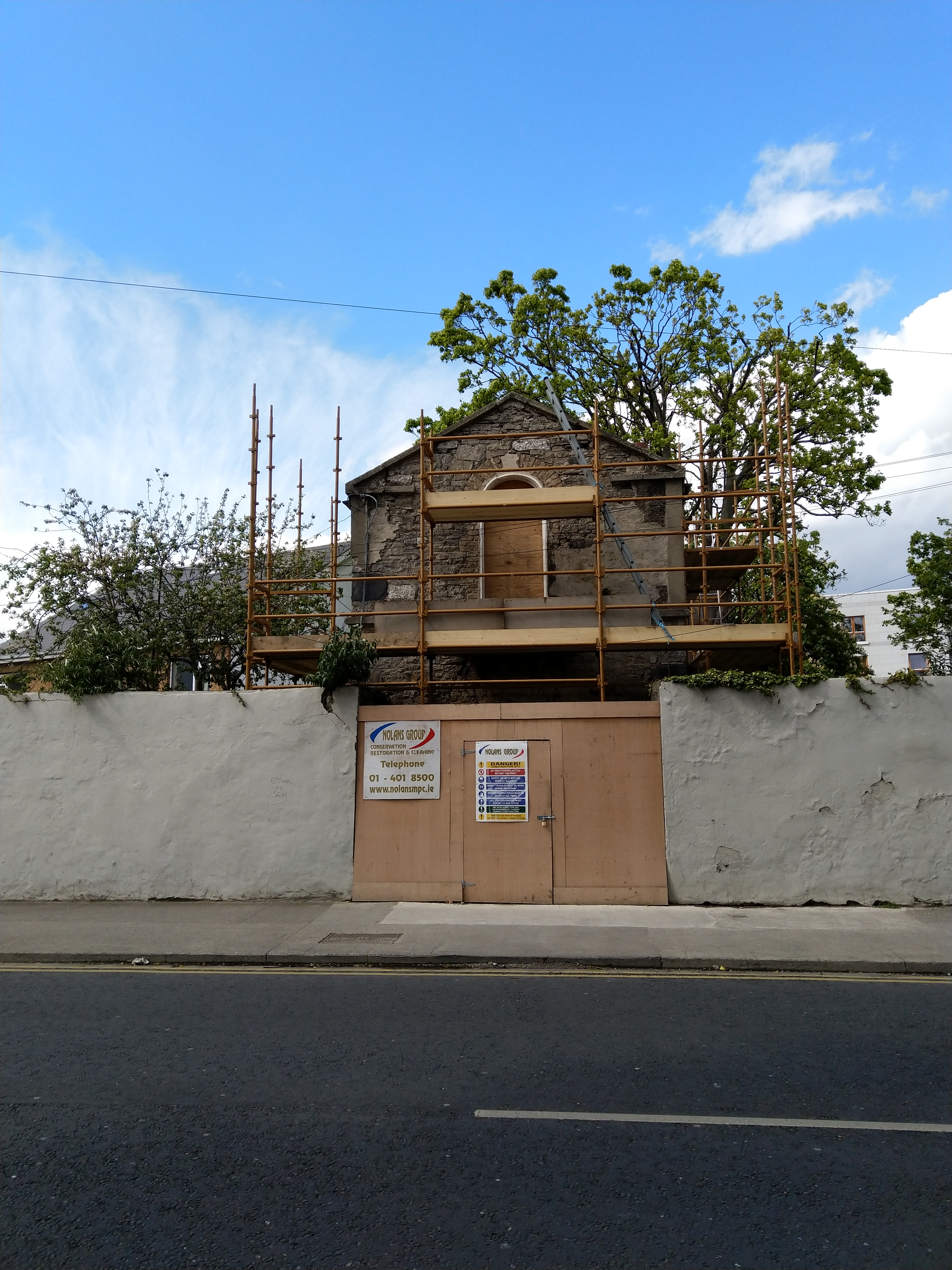
Renovations ongoing in May 2021

From the late 1800s, the cemetery went into decline. The last burial in the 19th century was a Samuel Wachman in 1899. In the 20th century, the only burials which took place were members of the Harris family: Juliette Harris (wife of Lewis Wormser Harris) in 1908; Ernest Wormser Harris (son of Juliette and Lewis Wormser Harris) in 1946; and lastly Maude Jeanette Harris, 1958. In 1898, a new cemetery was established on Aughavannagh Road in Dolphin's Barn by Robert Bradlaw and the Dolphin's Barn Jewish Burial Society. Bradlaw was one of the founders of the St. Kevin's Parade Synagogue. The new cemetery was dedicated to Sir Moses Montefiore.

In 2019, ownership of the cemetery and mortuary house was transferred to Dublin City Council from the Dublin Jewish Board of Guardians. The site is being considered for National Monument status. A refurbishment of the mortuary house and grounds began in 2021.

== Notable burials ==
There are 148 headstones in the cemetery. Notable burial plots include those of Alderman Lewis Harris (1812–1876). Harris's standing in the city is attested to by the eminent people who attended his burial in Ballybough:

Lewis Harris was buried at Ballybough and his funeral was attended by the Lord Mayor, by Aldermen, physiscians, lawyers, clergymen of the Irish Church, and every single Jew in Dublin.

The Cohen family, a prominent Jewish family who manufactured pencils, are also buried in the cemetery. The Cohens built a hut in the cemetery in 1798. This was replaced by a permanent caretaker's lodge in 1857.

== In creative works ==
It is sometimes incorrectly described as the graveyard that author Bram Stoker, who lived nearby, used to visit when he was young, and which influenced his novel Dracula. In fact, Stoker visited another nearby cemetery which was also sometimes called Ballybough Cemetery, known as the "suicide plot," which was used for suicide victims, robbers and highwaymen, through whose corpses' hearts wooden stakes were driven. This cemetery was likely located across the Luke Kelly Bridge on Clonliffe Road.

Inspired by the old cemetery, Dublin poet Gerry Mc Donnell (McDonnell) wrote the poetry collection Mud Island Elegy, a series of imaginary monologues looking at Jewish life in 19th-century Ireland. Several of the poems found in his Mud Island Anthology were also inspired by the cemetery.
