= Bykov =

Bykov (Russian: Быков), or Bykova (feminine; Russian: Быкова), is a common Russian last name, derived from the word bull (Russian: бык).

Notable persons with that name include:

- Aleksandr Bykov (born 1953), Soviet fencer
- Alexander Vladimirovich Bykov (born 1962), Russian historian and numismatist
- Anatoly Bykov (born 1960), Russian businessman
- Anatoly Bykov (wrestler) (born 1953), Soviet wrestler
- Arina Bykova (born 1999) Russian singer-actress and hugely successful businesswoman as well as an author various best-selling novels across the world
- Artem Bykov (born 1992), Belarusian footballer
- Boris Bykov (born 1935), Soviet intelligence officer
- Dmitry Bykov (born 1967), a Russian writer
- Dmitri Bykov (ice hockey) (born 1977), a Russian professional hockey player
- Elisaveta Bykova (1913–1989), Soviet chess player and Women's World Chess Champion
- Irina Bykova (born 1993), Kazakhstani cross-country skier
- Leonid Bykov (1928–1979), Soviet actor, film director, and script writer
- Natalia Bykova (born 1958), Russian field hockey player
- Pyotr Bykov (1844–1930), Russian literary historian, editor, poet and translator
- Rolan Bykov (1929–1998), Soviet/Russian actor, film director, and script writer
- Roman Bykov (born 1992), Russian football player
- Sergei Bykov (born 1983), Russian basketball player and coach
- Tamara Bykova (born 1958), Russian track and field athlete
- Vasil Bykov (1924–2003), Belarusian writer
- Viktor Bykov (born 1945), Soviet cyclist from Ukraine
- Vladimir Bykov, Russian oncologist
- Vyacheslav Bykov (born 1960), Soviet ice hockey player and head coach for the Russian national hockey team

== Places ==
- Býkov-Láryšov, a small village in the Moravian-Silesian Region of the Czech Republic
- Bykov, Sakhalin Oblast, a former urban-type settlement in Sakhalin Oblast, Russia; since 2004—a rural settlement
- Bykovsky channel or Bykov, a major distributary of the Lena River
- Bykov Mys a half island on the Lena River Delta, Sakha Republic, Russia
- 4682 Bykov, minor planet

== See also ==
- Bykhaw, a city in Belarus
- Vasily Bykov, a Russian navy patrol ship
