= Lena Delta =

River delta

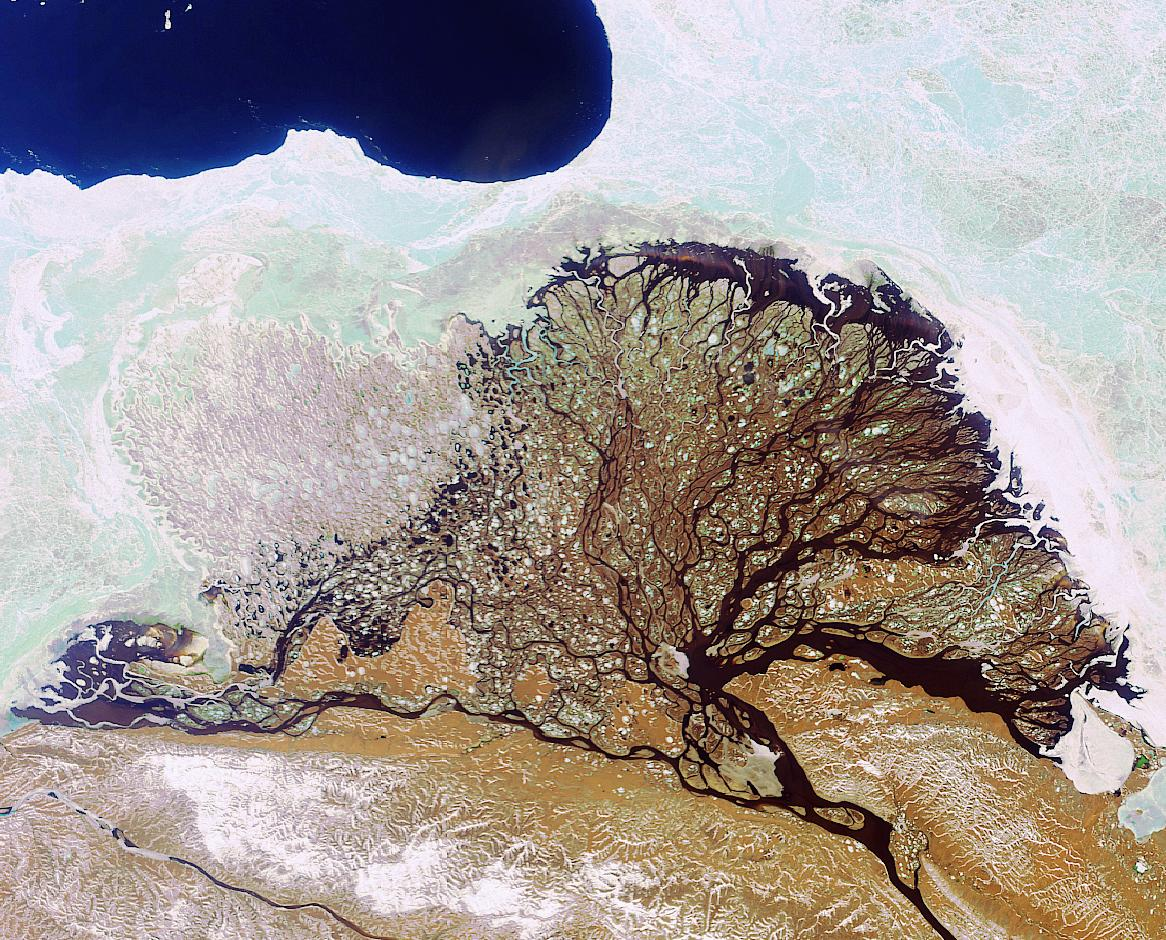
The Lena Delta imaged from space

The Lena Delta (Russian: Дельта Лены, romanized: Del'ta Leny, Yakut: Өлүөнэ дельта, romanized: Ölüöné delʹta) is a large network of distributary channels draining the Lena River into the Laptev Sea in the Arctic Ocean. One of the world's largest river deltas, and the largest in the Eurasian Arctic, it is covered by thousands of river channels and tens of thousands of lakes. Mostly covered by tundra and overlying a layer of permafrost between 500 and 600 metres (1,600 and 2,000 ft) thick, the delta's geology largely consists of alluvial deposits, some of which have been tectonically uplifted into high terraces. The delta serves as a habitat for a diverse array of fish, birds, small mammals, and zooplankton. Reindeer are also found in the area, although they have been threatened by overhunting.

Although remote and sparsely populated, the delta has been traditionally inhabited by various Siberian indigenous peoples, including the Evenki, Evens, Tumats, and Yakuts, who largely subsisted off fishing. Under the Soviet Union, indigenous populations in the area were moved into two main settlements at the southeastern periphery of the delta: Tiksi and the fishing village of Bykov Mys. They were joined by thousands of Finns, Lithuanians, and Yakuts who were resettled in the area by the 1940s. Much of the area's population, including most of European descent, left the area in the 1980s and 1990s, following the Perestroika reform period and the collapse of the USSR. Many Yakuts have settled in the area since the 1990s. Fishing is a major local industry, with some former villages throughout the delta used temporarily as fishing stations, while the Bykovskaya and Olenekskaya channels are used as transport routes from the Lena to the Northern Sea Route. Heavily affected by climate change, much of the delta lies within the Lena Delta zapovednik (protected natural area), established in 1985.

== Geography ==
The Stolb meterological station in the upper Lena Delta

The Lena River is the world's eighth largest river in terms of drainage area and length, and is the second largest river draining into the Arctic Ocean by discharge, following the Yenisei. It flows about 4,400 kilometres (2,700 mi) north from the Baikal Mountains, meeting the Arctic Ocean at a large delta on the Laptev Sea. Located within the Sakha Republic of Russia, the Lena River Delta is the largest in the Eurasian Arctic and among the largest in the world, stretching about 190 kilometres (120 mi) from north to south, and 190 kilometres (120 mi) from east to west. Depending on the definitions used, the uppermost point of the delta is at Tit-Ary Island or Stolb Island, resulting in a total area of 28,000 to 32,000 km^{2} (11,000 to 12,000 mi^{2}).

The Kharaulakh mountain range borders the delta to the southeast, while the Chekanovsky Ridge runs along the southwest, separating the delta from the neighboring Olenyok river basin. The largest island in the delta is Arga Island (also known as Arga Muora Sise) in the northwest, about 110 kilometres (68 mi) in diameter. North of Arga, Dunai-Artya Island lies at the northernmost extant of the delta.

A layer of permafrost between 500 and 600 metres (1,600 and 2,000 ft) thick underlies the whole delta, separated from the surface by an annually-thawed layer about 30 to 50 centimetres (0.98 to 1.64 ft) in depth. Tundra covers almost all of the delta, except for a small area of larch forest on Tit-Ary Island.

=== Hydrology ===
An island in the upper Lena Delta

There are over 6,000 distributary channels which run through the delta, totaling 14,600 kilometres (9,100 mi) in length, well as around 30,000 lakes. Many oxbow lakes are found in the eastern part of the delta, while thermokarst lakes are predominant in the west and especially northwest.

About 60-70% of the Lena's water discharges into the Arctic through the Sardakhskaya–Trofimovskaya channel system, which flows east through the delta and empties into the Arctic at Buor-Khaya Gulf. The east-flowing Bykovskaya Branch discharges about 20-25% of the river's water, while the west-flowing Olenekskaya and Tumanskaya branches together discharge about 5-10%. The Bykovskaya and Olenekskaya branches are the main navigable waterways in the delta, used to transport goods up the Lena to the port of Tiksi and the Northern Sea Route.

=== Climate ===
The average annual temperature of the region is −12.8 °C (9.0 °F). Monthly averages range from −30.9 °C (−23.6 °F) in January to 7.7 °C (45.9 °F) in July. Average annual precipitation varies between 200 to 400 millimetres (7.9 to 15.7 in) per year, with the highest levels during the summer. The ground is free from frost for only about 50 days per year. Due to the intense seasonal variations in temperature across Siberia, the flow rate of the Lena is highly variable throughout the year. The river is covered by a 2-metre (6.6 ft) thick layer of ice from around October to late May, during which time its flow is relatively minimal. More than half of the river's annual discharge occurs immediately following snowmelt in late May and June.

Climate change has led to greater increases of water and sediment discharge in the Lena Delta than in the rest of the Lena watershed, or in other major polar rivers, such as the Ob and Yenisei. Since 1998, average June water temperatures have risen by 1.1 °C (2 °F). As temperature increases in the Arctic between 1979 and 2021 were almost four times the world average, a 2023 study described the delta as the "world's 'hottest spot' in terms of the hydrological consequences of climate change".

== Geology ==
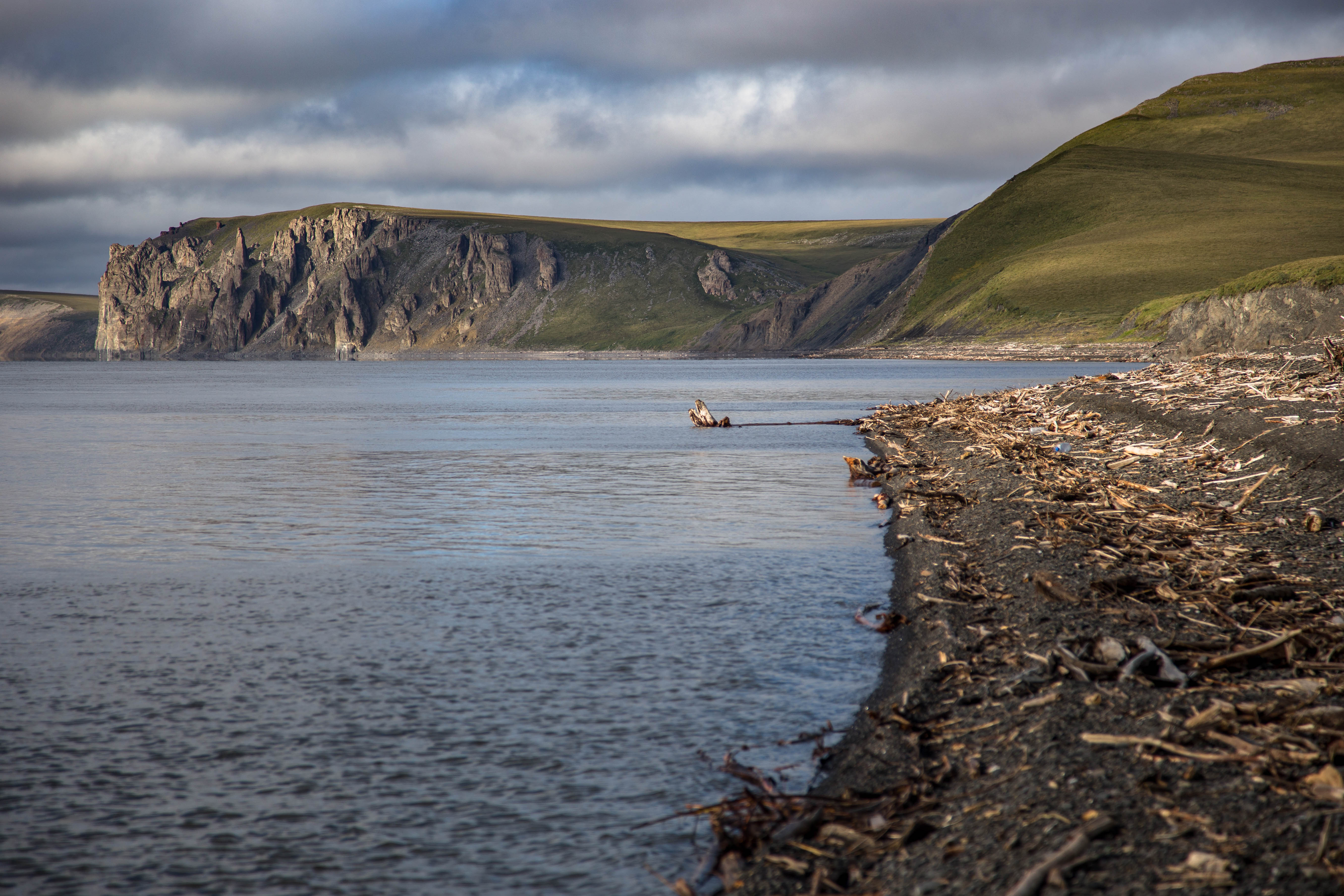
Cliffs in the Lena Delta. Tectonic activity has resulted in elevation differences of up to 60 metres (200 ft) between different layers of alluvial deposits.

About 60% of the Lena Delta consists of modern alluvium (river deposits), with the remainder occupied by deposits which predate the Holocene (before about 12,000 years ago). Tectonic uplift has led to sharp elevation differences between different geological units, with some islands uplifted up to 60 metres (200 ft) above the modern alluvial deposits. Small outcroppings of bedrock dating to the Devonian (420–359 million years ago) are present in pockets. Parts of the southern half of the delta are covered by an "ice complex", the remnants of a coastal plain composed of Quaternary-era sediment, which was uplifted and infused with very high amounts of ice. A large sandy terrace is divided across several of the northwestern islands, including Arga. These islands are likely the remnants of an uplifted alluvial fan predating the ice complex.

The oldest portions of the delta is likely the sandy alluvial fan, formed during the Late Pleistocene between marine isotope stages 5 through 3 (roughly 130,000 to 50,000 years ago). These were followed by the ice complex sediments formed by periodic glacial outwash from the mountains to the south during the Last Glacial Period. The modern delta deposits began to develop around 6,000 to 5,000 years ago. As the climate warmed in the Early Holocene, decreasing peak flow and sediment size, the Lena shifted away from heavily braided channels, instead creating floodplains and slight meanders. Tectonic activity continues to occur in the Lena Delta, originating from the boundary between the Eurasian and North American plates. Between 1909 and 1980, 26 earthquakes were recorded in the delta and its vicinity.

== Biology ==
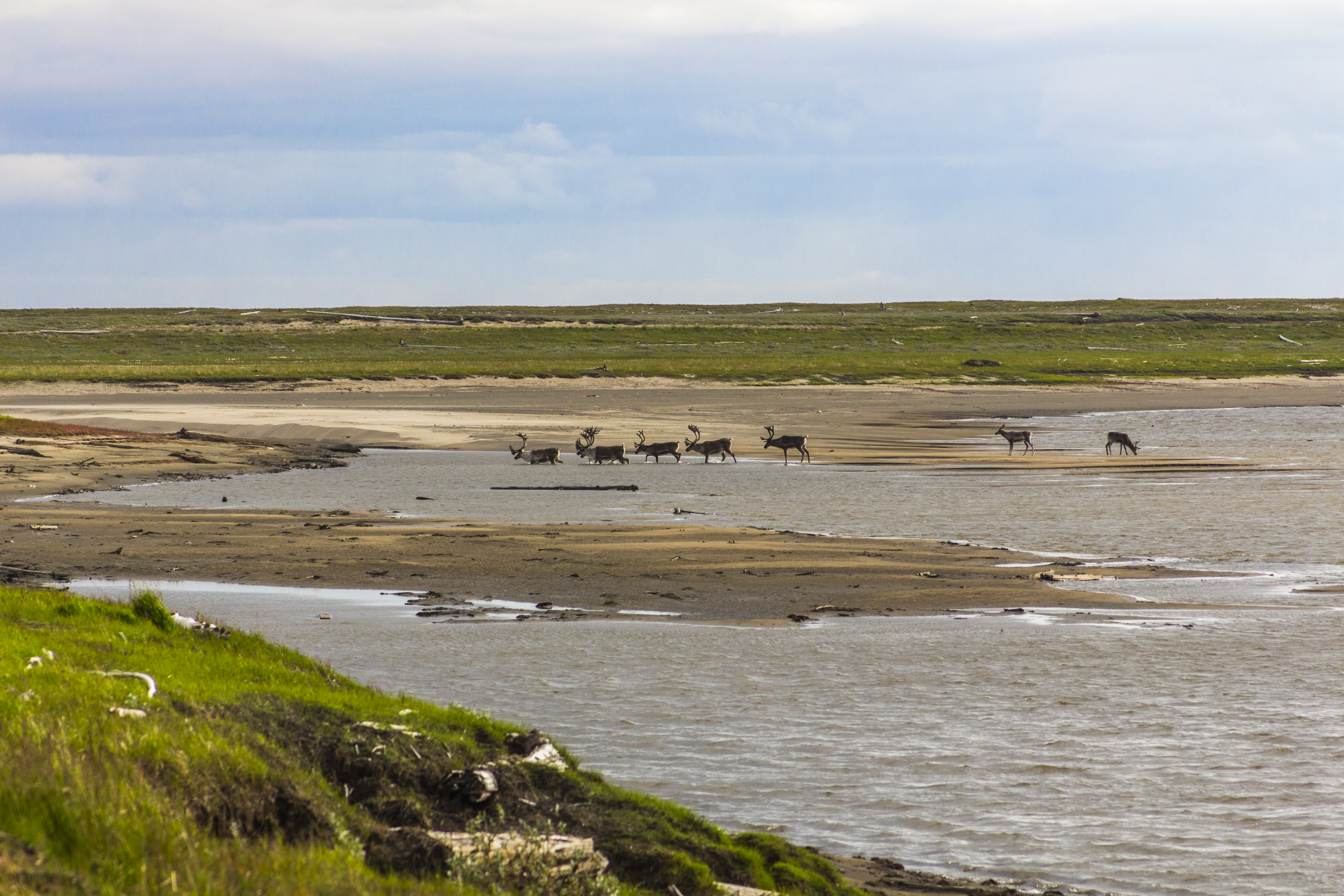
Reindeer crossing the Bolshaya Tumatskaya channel

Salmonids such as Arctic char, chum salmon, pink salmon, Siberian taimen, and Yakutian char (an endemic species) can be found in the Lena delta. All of these salmonids are also found in other portions of the Lena, with the Siberian taimen and Arctic char found throughout the basin. Other fish found in the delta include Arctic grayling, Arctic lamprey, burbot, common roach, ide, northern pike, Pacific rainbow smelt, perch, ruffe, Siberian sturgeon, and freshwater whitefishes such as Arctic cisco, broad whitefish, humpback whitefish, least cisco, muksun, nelma, peled, and tugun.

Many species of algae are found in the Lena Delta. Diatoms are largely of species of the genera Melosira and Asterionella, while chlorophytes are mainly represented by the genus Actinastrum. In small lakes throughout the delta, the cyanobacteria Anabaena and the chlorophyte Pediastrum are common. The 150 known species of zooplankton in the delta include a diverse range of rotifers (70 species), copepods (36 species), and cladocera (36 species). Common benthic invertebrates, most prevalent in the lower reaches of the delta, include Cryptochironomus midges, and the annelid worms Propappus volki and Limnodrilus hoffmeisteri.

=== Land environment ===
About 45% of the delta is covered by various types of tundra, dominated by sedges, mosses, and (primarily on Agra Island) shrubs. About 10% of the delta's surface area is covered by floodplains without significant vegetation cover. In a 1997 survey, 16 mammal species and 76 bird species were recorded in the delta. Bird population densities are unusually high for the latitude, with the most common species including Lapland longspur, red phalarope, and various Calidris (sandpiper) species. The West Siberian lemming is common in the delta. Carnivorans attested in the area include the wolf, arctic fox, least weasel, and stoat.

Large reindeer populations inhabited the delta until the 1980s, when the population collapsed to only 5% of its former numbers due to overhunting. As of the 2000s, reindeer hunting no longer takes place in the area. The Lena Delta zapovednik (protected natural area) was established in 1985, protecting portions of the lower Lena and its delta. It is divided into two sectors: Deltovyi, covering 13,000 square kilometres (5,000 mi^{2}), and Sokol, covering 1,330 square kilometres (510 mi^{2}), each surrounded by a buffer zone. A regional reserve was established in the eastern portion of the delta in 1996.

== Demographics ==
Bykov Mys (or Bykovsky), 2013

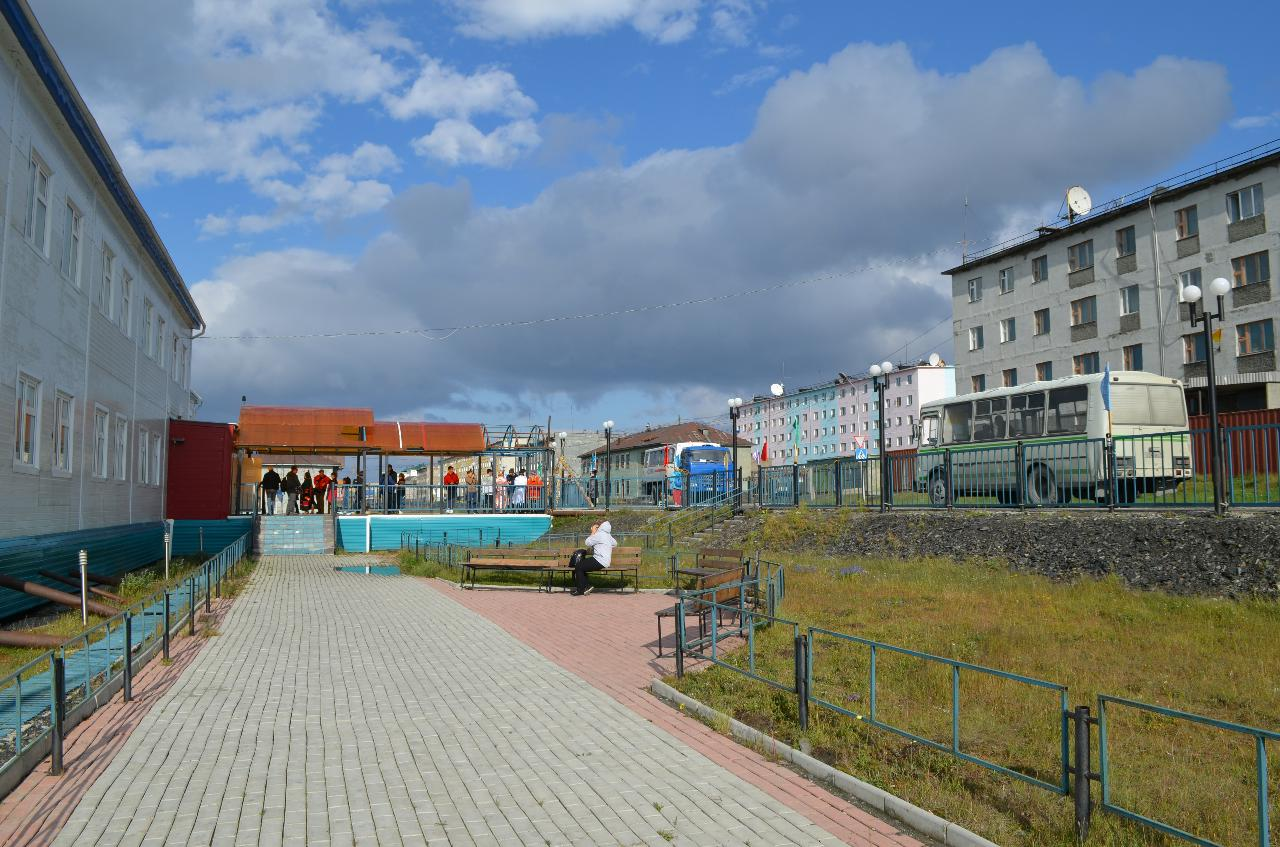
Tiksi, 2017

Much of the Lena Delta is entirely uninhabited, although the indigenous Evenki people and (to a lesser extant) the Yakuts have traditionally inhabited the region. Tiksi and Bykov Mys, on the southeastern periphery of the delta, are the only legally-recognized settlements in the area. As of 2016, Tiksi had a population of 4,556, while Bykov Mys had a population of 514. Many former villages throughout the delta are occupied seasonally as fishing or hunting stations. Fishing is a primary local industry, occurring mostly between May and September.

Meterological and hydrological study stations were operated at Tit-Ary from 1948 to 1990, Malyshev Island from 1953 to 1989, and Sagyalah-Ary from 1962 to 1991. A station at Stolb Island has operated since the 1950s. The International Biological Station Lena-Nordenskjold was established on the Bykovskaya branch in 1995, while a Russian-German cooperative science station opened on Samoylov Island in the upper portion of the delta in 2006.

== History ==
Indigenous groups present in the region include the Evenki, Evens, Tumats, and Yakuts. Unlike many neighboring groups, the indigenous peoples of the Lena Delta practiced neither reindeer herding or marine mammal hunting, instead relying on fishing as their main means of subsistence.

=== Russian colonization and resettlement ===
During the International Polar Year, the Russian physician and explorer Alexander von Bunge established a polar station at Sagastyr Island in the delta as part of a Russian Geographical Society expedition. Bunge offered medical care to local Yakuts and recorded their beliefs and lifestyle.

During the Soviet Union, most indigenous peoples were moved to two main settlements, Tiksi and the fishing village of Bykov Mys, under ukrupnenie ('amalgamation') policies. They adopted the Russian language during this period, which largely supplanted their indigenous Tungusic languages. During the early 20th century, the Soviet government settled about 3,000 to 4,000 Finns, 4000 Lithuanians (including many Lithuanian Jews), and 5,000 Yakuts in the Lena Delta. By the early 1940s, 12 different fishing collectives had been established among the ethnic diasporas of the region. Many of these were later amalgamated into the Kolkhoz Arktika collective.

=== Contemporary history ===
A scientific research ship in the Lena Delta

Since the Perestroika reform period of the late 1980s, most ethnic Russians, Finns, and Lithuanians have migrated away from the Lena Delta. Tiksi's population declined from 15,000 to around 5,000. Beginning in the 1990s, following the collapse of the USSR, many Yakuts (the dominant indigenous group of the Sakha Republic), alongside smaller numbers of Evenks and Evens, moved into Tiksi. As a result, the Yakut language has become commonly spoken in the region, although Russian remains the most widely used.

The concentration of population into Tiksi and Bykov Mys has continued after the collapse of the USSR, but many former villages across the delta continue to see seasonal use by Kolkhoz Arktika. Despite collectivization policies and the collapse of the Soviet Union, Kolkhoz Arktika remains under collective local ownership. Former villages used as winter fishing stations by Kolkhoz Arktika include Arangastakh and Sagylakh Ary at the eastern end of the delta, Petrushka and Samakh Ary at the western end. The village of Taymylyr on the Olenyok maintains the Ystanakh Knocho fishing station at the western end.
