= Cryptochironomus hentonensis =

Scientific classification
- Kingdom: Animalia
- Phylum: Arthropoda
- Clade: Pancrustacea
- Class: Insecta
- Order: Diptera
- Family: Chironomidae
- Subfamily: Chironominae
- Genus: Cryptochironomus
- Species: C. hentonensis

Binomial name
- Cryptochironomus hentonensis Hasegawa & Sasa, 1987

Species of fly

Cryptochironomus hentonensis is a species of midge in the family Chironomidae.

The species was first described in 1987 by the Japanese entomologists Hideo Hasegawa & Manabu Sasa, from specimens collected on Okinawa Island and Ishigaki Island, in 1981 and 1982.
