= Museum of Diplomatic Corps =

Museum in Vologda, Russia

Museum of Diplomatic corps
- Музей дипломатического корпуса
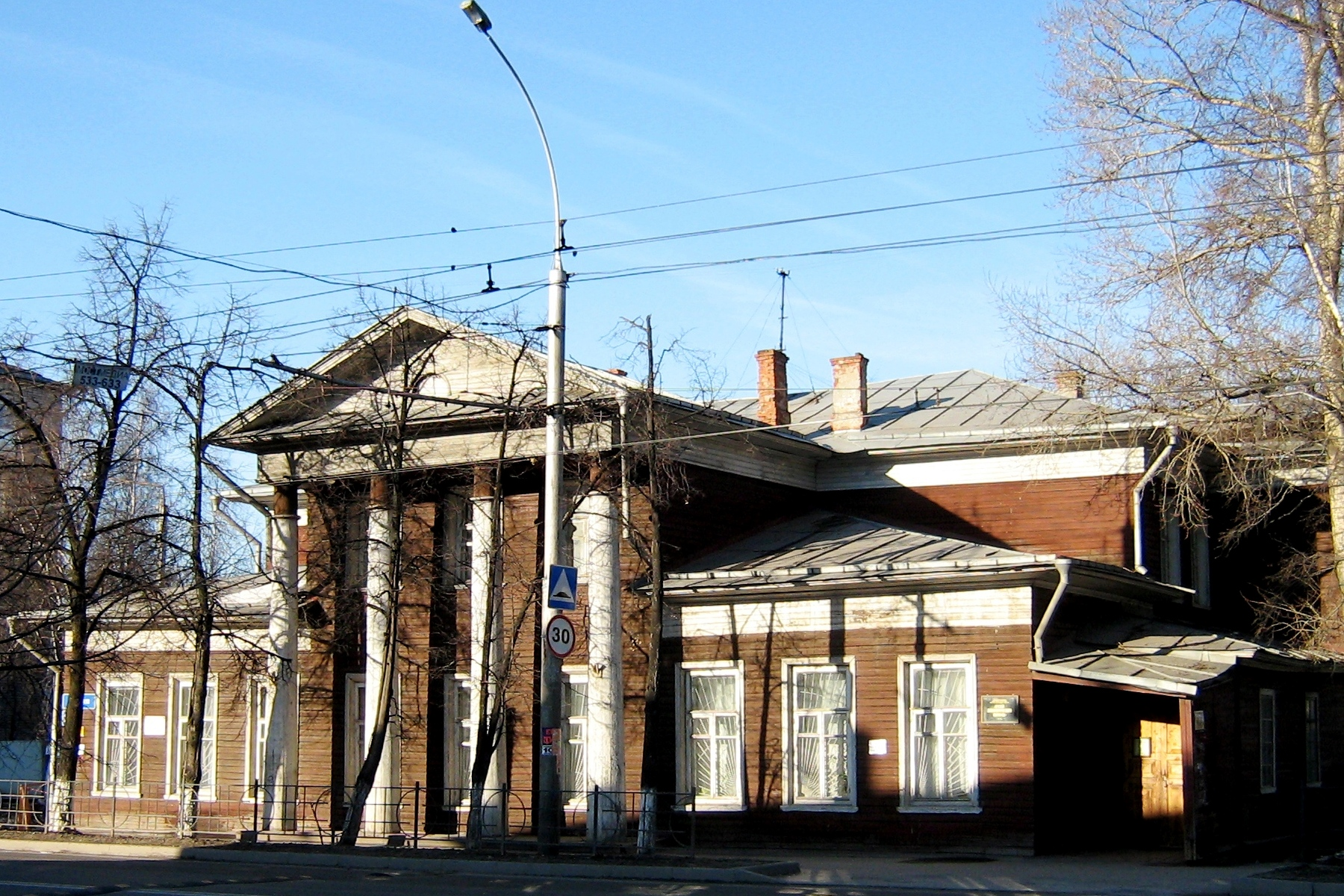
- Established: 16 July 1997
- Location: Vologda, Russia
- Coordinates: 59.2133°N 39.8920°E
- Type: private
- Visitors: more than 2000 (2011)
- Director: Alexander Bykov
- Public transit access: Vologda, Bus-stop «1000 melochey». Buses #5, 6, 12,17, 25, 49, 104 or trolleybuses #2, 2а.
- Website: http://www.musdip.org

The Museum of Diplomatic Corps (Russian: Музей дипломатического корпуса) was a private historical museum located in the Russian city of Vologda. It was situated in a wooden manor that belonged to a noble Pavel Puzan-Puzyrevsky (a listed building of the first third of the 19th century) where, in 1918, the American Embassy was quartered. The exposition of the museum was devoted to little known events which took place in Vologda in February–July 1918 connected with a stay of 11 foreign embassies and diplomatic missions headed by the American Ambassador David Rowland Francis.

The museum was closed on 4 November 2012.

== Diplomatic corps in Vologda in 1918 ==
In late February 1918, for about five months, Vologda became the so-called "diplomatic capital of Russia". Afraid of Petrograd's capture by German forces, representatives of 11 embassies evacuated to Vologda. Among them were the American, British, French, Serbian, Belgian, Siamese and Italian embassies, the Brazilian consulate and the Japanese, Chinese, and Swedish-Danish diplomatic missions led by the American Ambassador, David R. Francis.

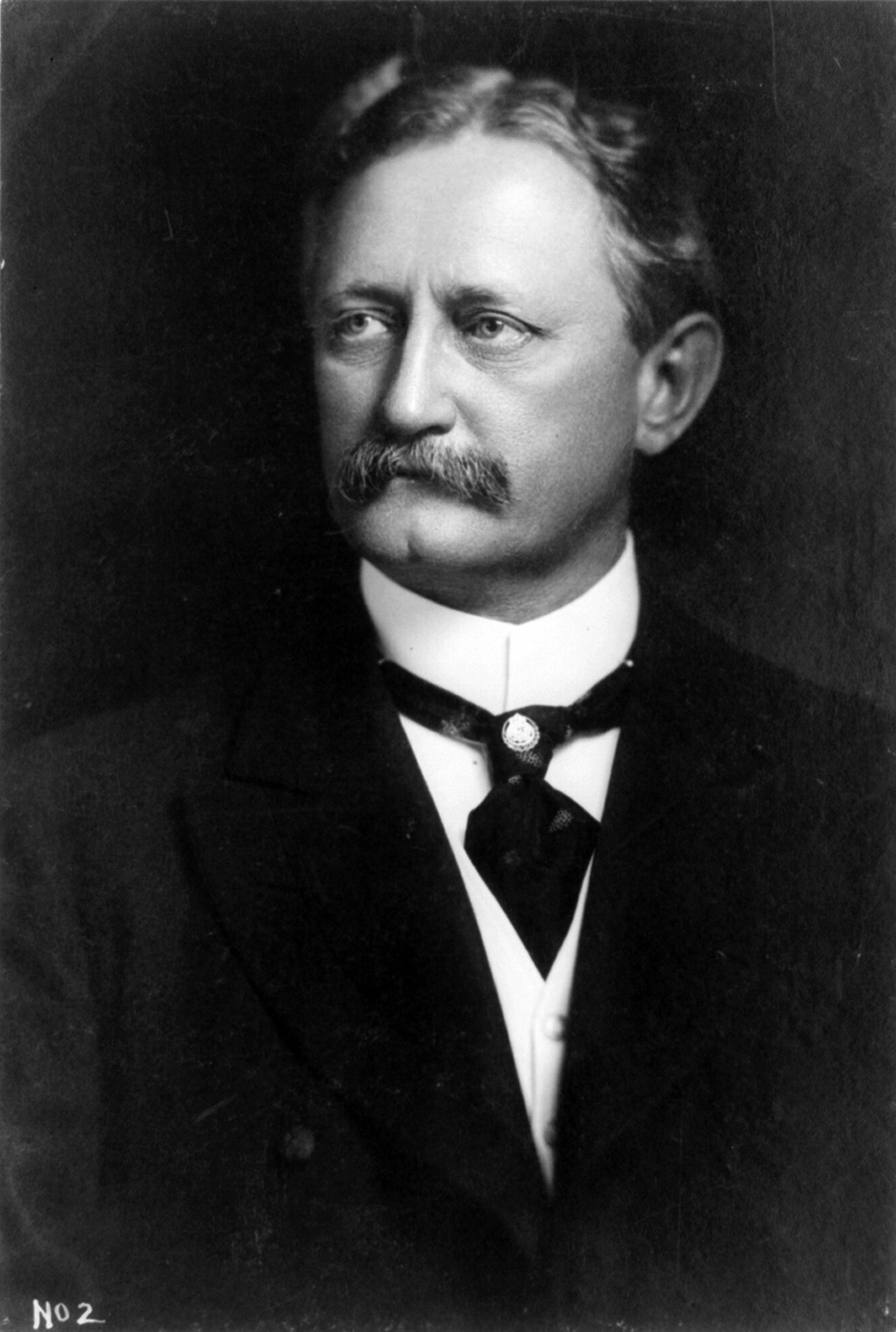
David Rowland Francis

D.R. Francis chose Vologda because of its distant location from the front line, its convenience in telegraph communication, and its intersection of important railroads which could be useful in case of an urgent evacuation of the missions in any direction.

During the five months of their stay in Vologda the diplomats analyzed the political situation in the Soviet Russia and gave recommendations to the governments of their countries. This fact didn’t pass unnoticed by the Bolshevik leaders. In the middle of 1918, they began to strengthen their power in the town including repressive measures against counterrevolutionaries. As a result, on 24 July 1918, the diplomats were compelled to leave Vologda.

Later on, the diplomats’ stay in the town was consigned to oblivion. The mentioning of the embassies in Vologda was politically dangerous. Soviet propaganda stigmatized the diplomats as "accomplices of the world imperialism" and they were mentioned only in the connection with their activities aimed at overthrowing the soviet power. At the same time, in the USA and Western Europe one considered the stay of the diplomatic corps in Vologda a waste of time.

== History of the museum ==
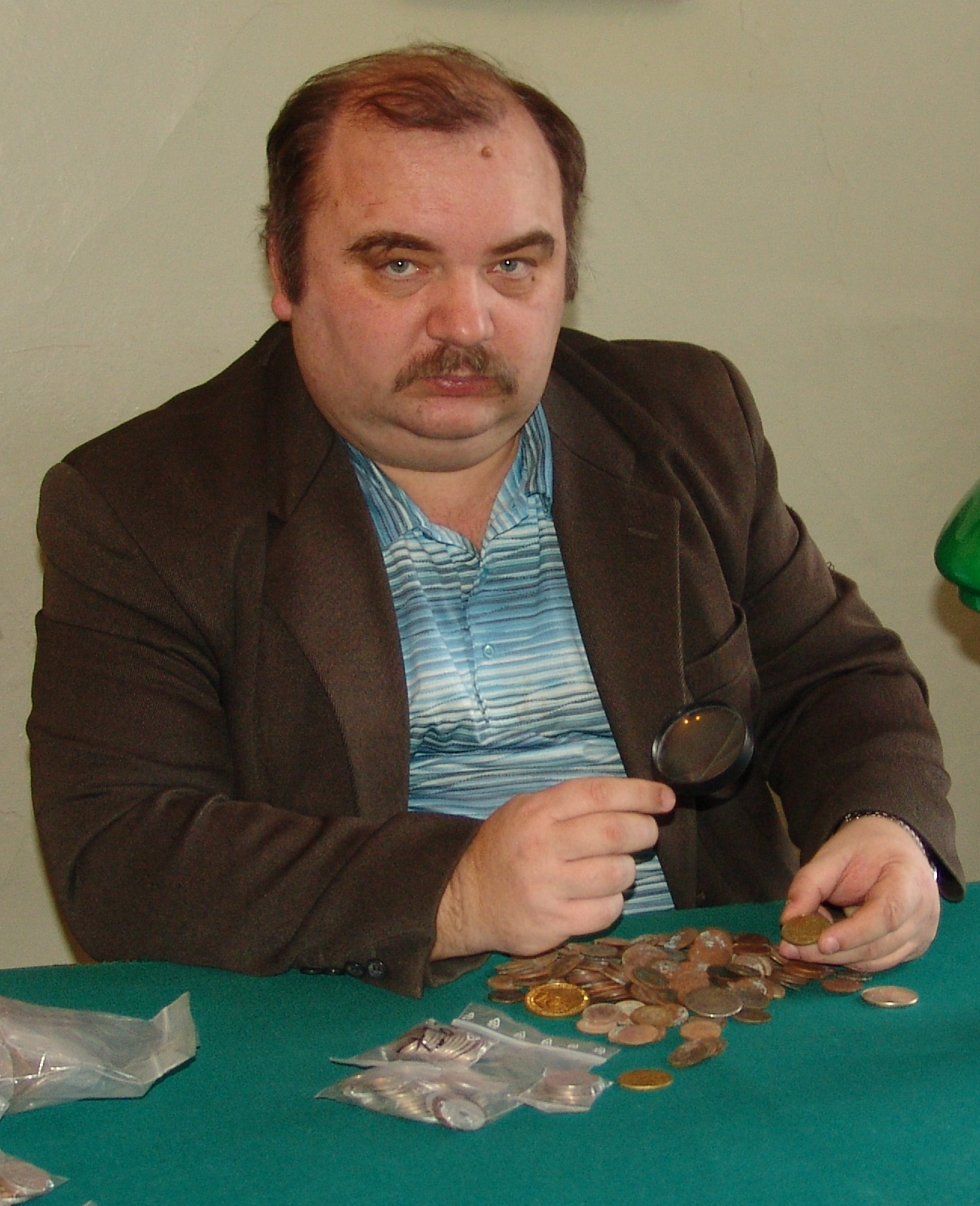
Alexander Bykov was the founder and last director of the museum

In 1996, a Vologda historian Alexander Bykov started compiling information about the diplomatic corps’ stay in Vologda. He succeeded in gathering a number of household items and copies of valuable documents, mainly from local archives and from the private archive of David R. Francis in Saint-Louis.
On 16 July 1997 Bykov organized an exhibition called "Foreign embassies in Vologda in 1918" in the same country manor. This date is considered the official foundation of the museum which, presently, is still located in the house of Puzan-Puzyrevsky.
Soon, Alexandr Bykov managed to gain access to the materials of the French diplomatic archive and to the criminal investigation department archive of the Federal Security Service of Russia . He took copies of valuable documents concerning activities of the French embassy in Vologda. Owing to those materials, on 25 June 1998, the exposition was enlarged with the direct support and participation of the U.S. government. The American Ambassador James F. Collins took part in the opening ceremony of the two halls of the Museum of Diplomatic Corps.

Since then, the museum made "friends" with relatives of the events of 1918. They became honorary guests of the museum. These "friends" included:

- Talton Francis Ray — businessman, grandson of the American Ambassador to Russia in 1916-1918 David R. Francis;
- Sir Chips Keswick — grandson of the British representative F.O. Lindley;
- Jean Dulce — grandson of the French representative Jean Dulce.

Other honorary guests of the museum included famous Russian and foreign figures:

- Prince Michael of Kent — member of the English royal house;
- Baron Eduard von Falz-Fein – famous Russian-born businessman from Liechtenstein;
- James H. Billington – director of the Library of the United States Congress;
- James F. Collins - U.S. diplomat and ambassador to Russia in 1997-2001;
- Sir Rodric Braithwaite - ambassador of the United Kingdom to Russia in 1988-1992.
- other representatives of the American, British, French, Italian, Japanese, Brazilian, Canadian, and Hungarian embassies
- Norman E. Saul – historian, author of a capital work in three volumes on history of Russian-American relations;
- Alexander Korzhakov – head of B.N. Eltsin’s security service in 1990-1996;
- Nikita Belykh – leader of the "Union of Rightist Forces" (2005-2008), governor of the Kirov Oblast (since 2009);
- Permanent correspondents of the museum include professors of institutes, universities, museums, and libraries of the world.
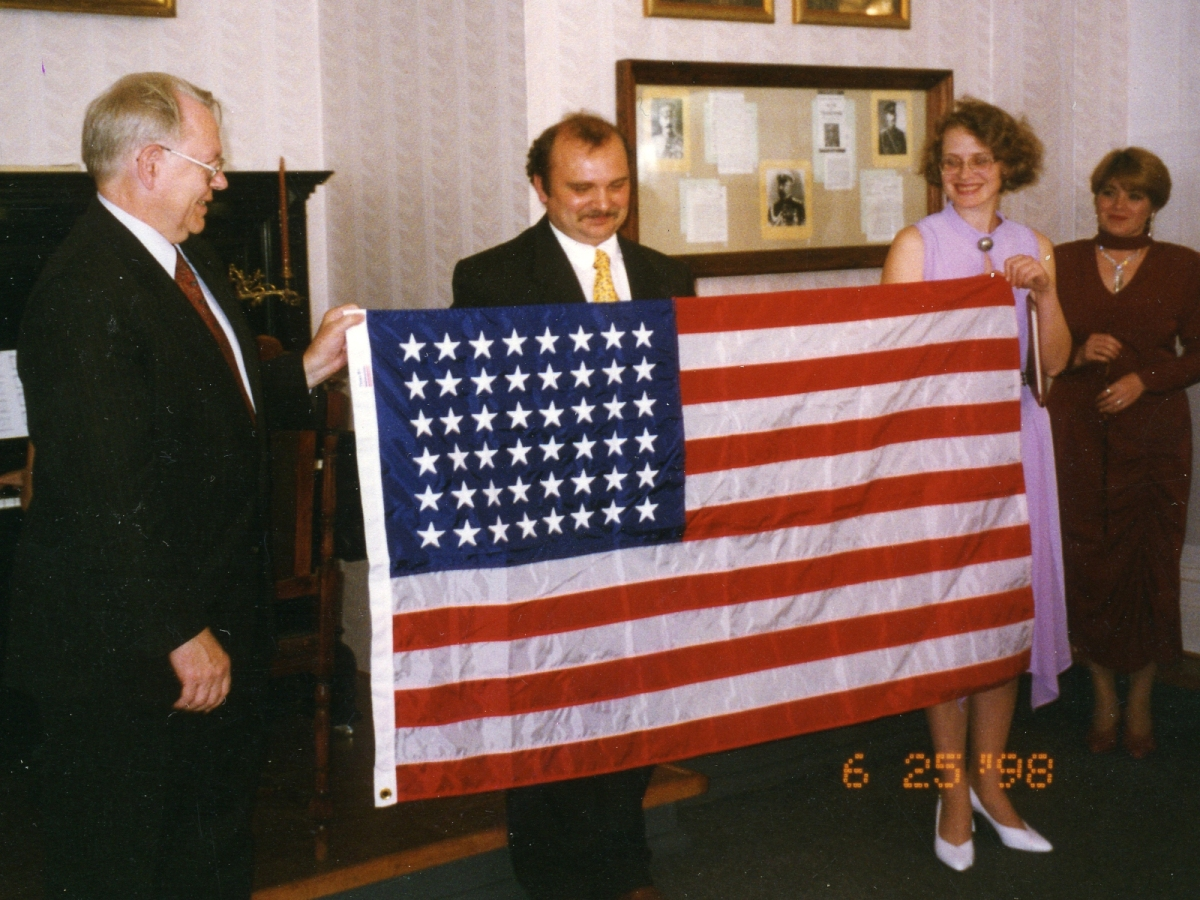
American Ambassador James Collins (left) and Alexandr Bykov (center) at the official opening of the two museum's halls on 25 June 1998

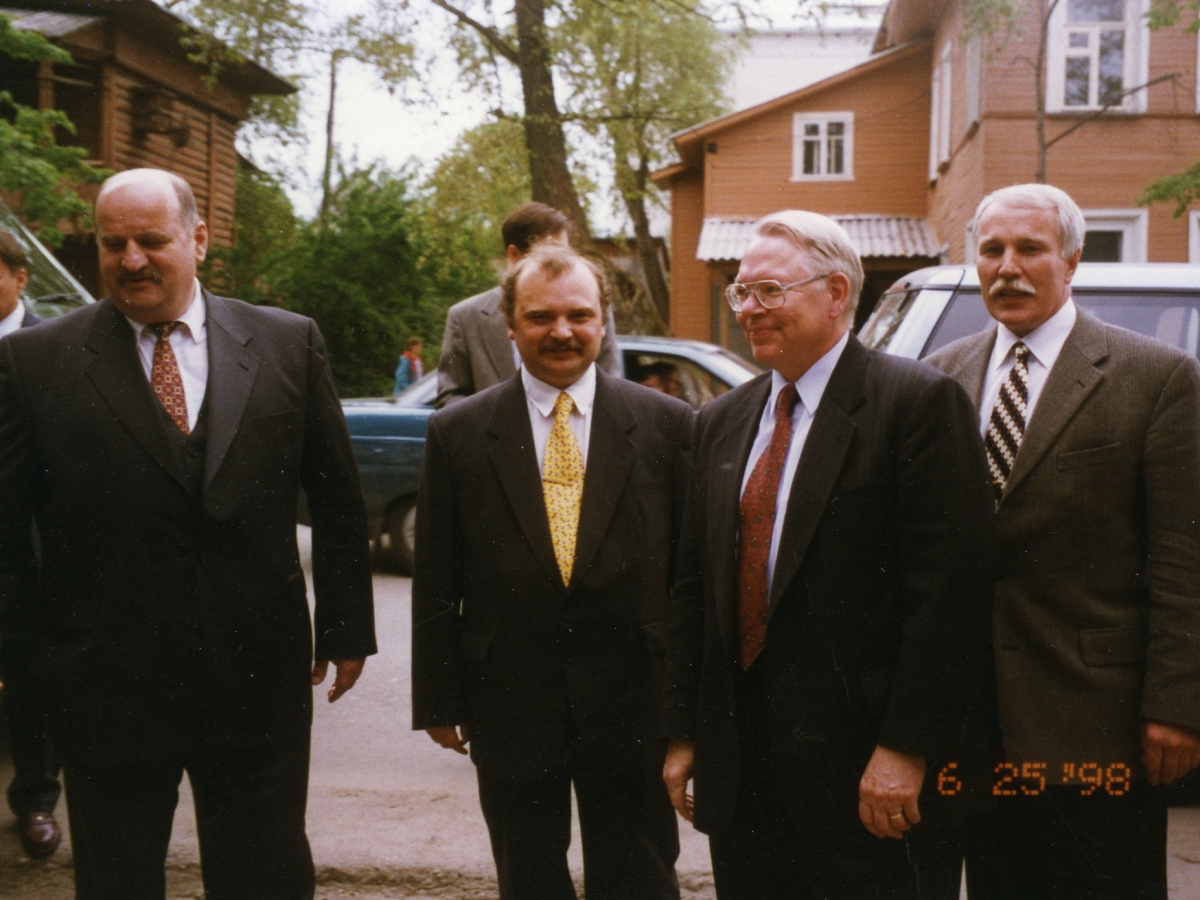
From left to right: Alexey Yakunichev (Head of Vologda city), Alexander Bykov, James Collins and Ivan Pozdnyakov (vice-governor) on 25 June 1998

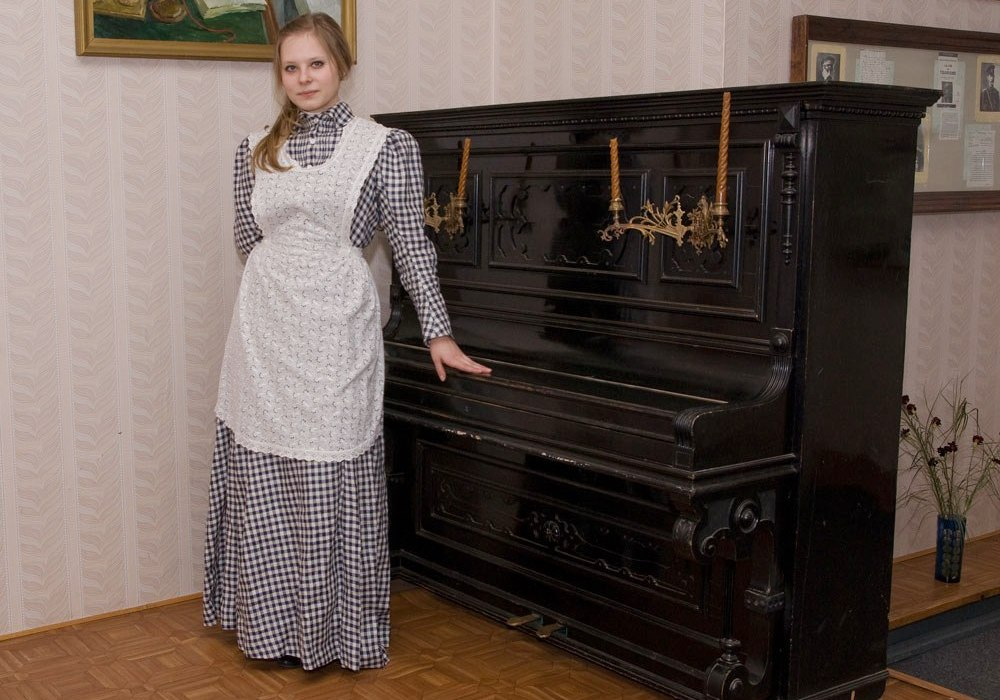
At festive ceremonies of the museum the atmosphere of an epoch is reconstructed

== Exposition of the museum ==
The exposition of the Museum of Diplomatic Corps was devoted to the history of diplomats’ stay in Vologda in 1918.

== Museum activities ==
The Museum of Diplomatic Corps received Russian and foreign tourists, offered cultural-excursion programs both at the museum and in the city, and hosted musical evenings, creative meetings, and business receptions in the halls of the museum.

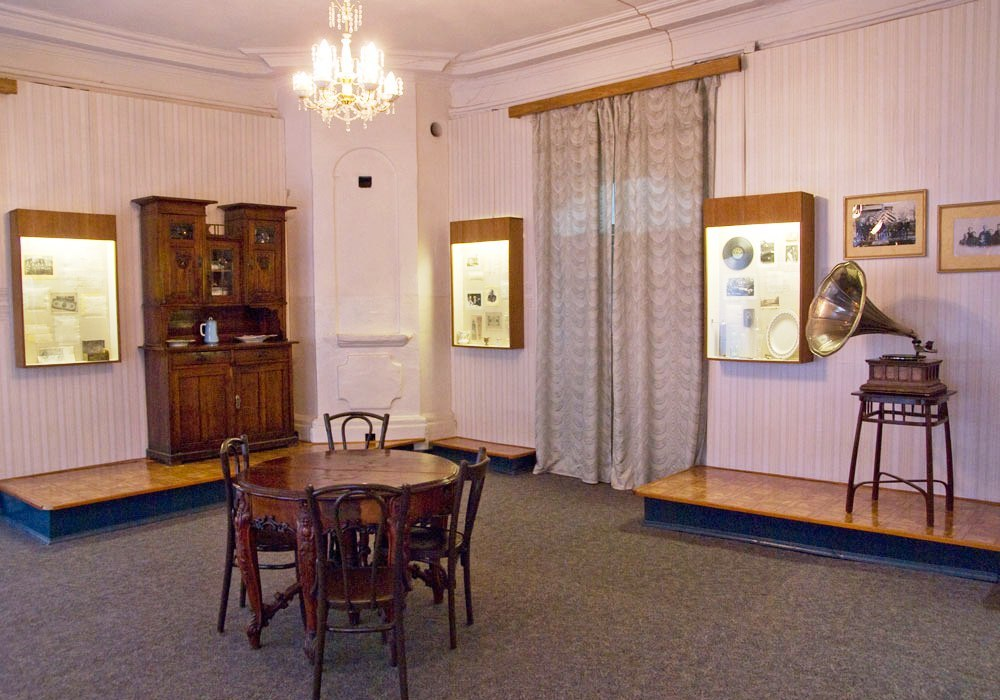

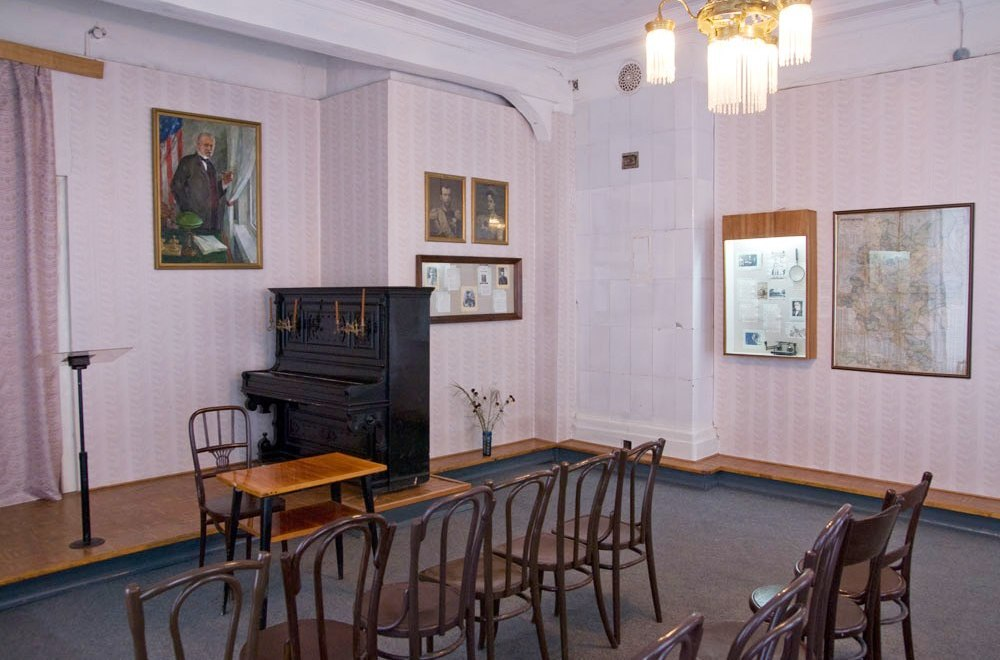

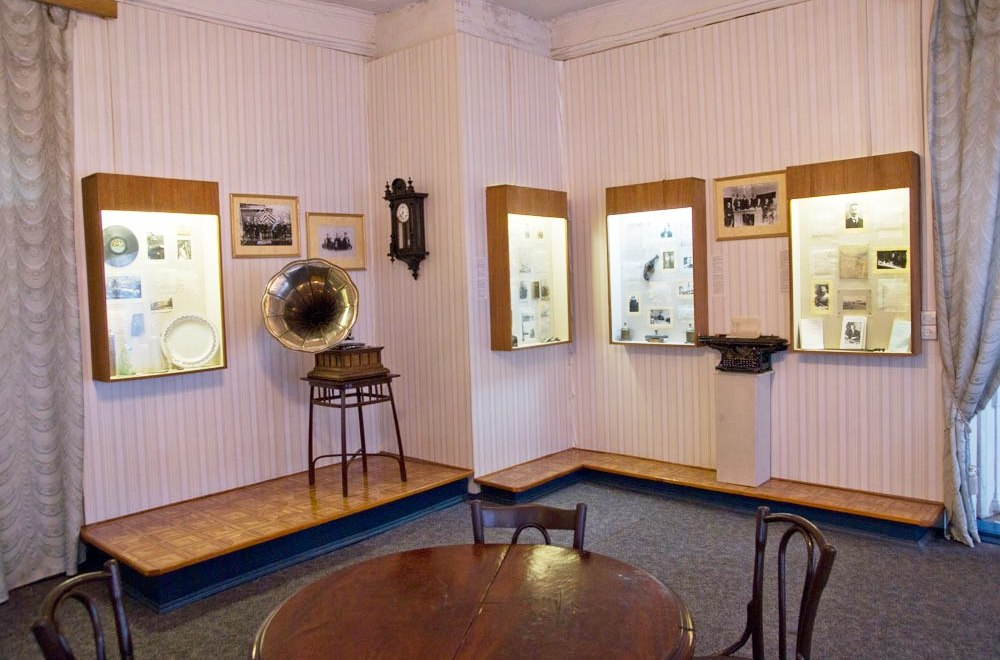
