= Lena Delta Wildlife Reserve =

Strict nature reserve in the Sakha Republic, Russia

Lena Delta Nature Reserve
- Russian: Усть-Ленский (государственный природный) заповедник
- IUCN category Ia (strict nature reserve)
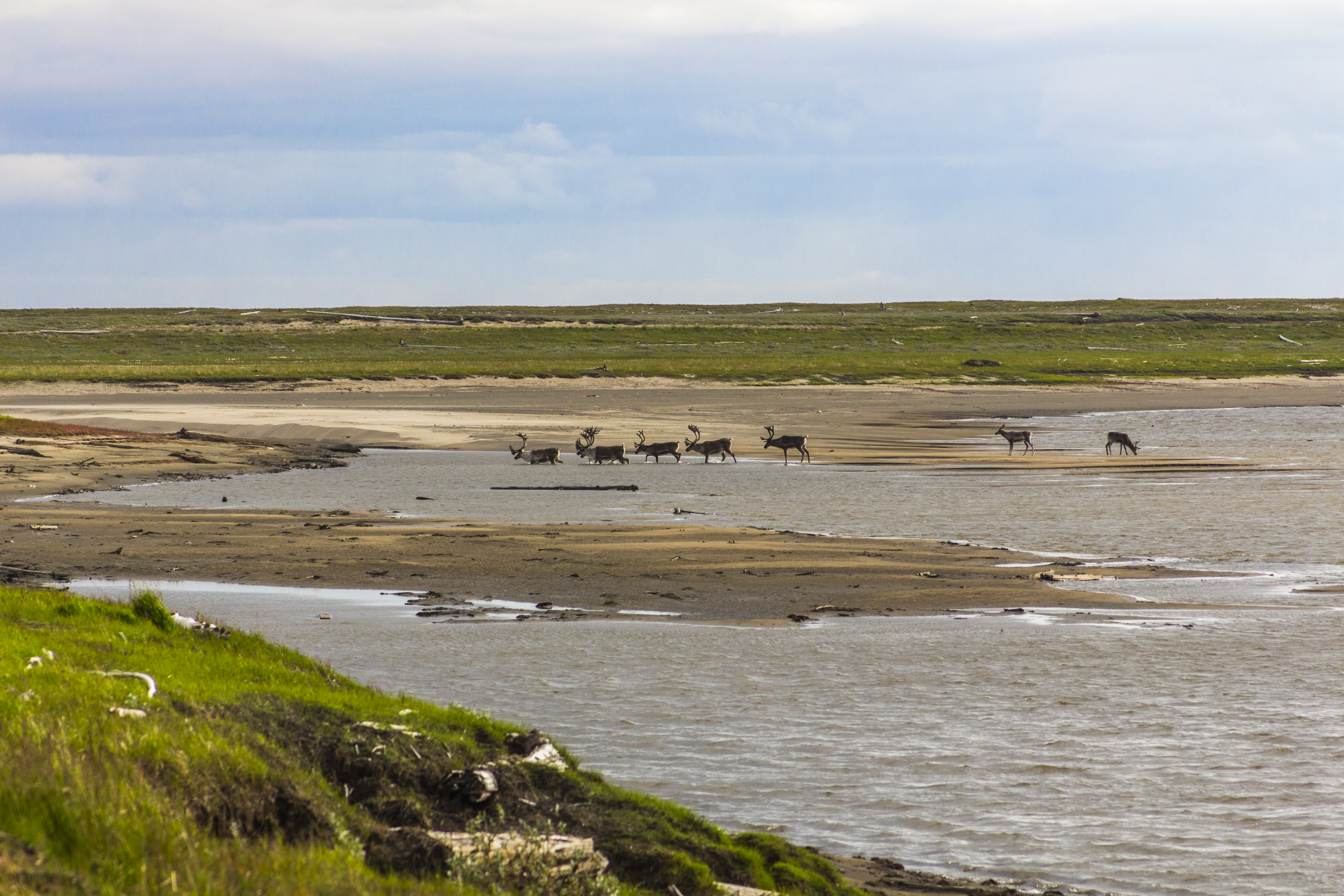
- Reindeer herd crossing the Bolshaya Tumatskaya channel within the reserve (2014)
- Interactive map of Lena Delta Nature Reserve
- Location: Sakha Republic, Russia
- Nearest city: Tiksi
- Coordinates: 73°10′52″N 125°18′57″E
- Area: 14,330 km^{2} (5,530 sq mi)
- Established: 1985

Lena Delta Nature Reserve (Russian: Усть-Ленский государственный природный заповедник) is a Zapovednik (“scientific nature reserve”) located in the Lena River Delta of the Sakha Republic, in the far north of eastern Siberia, Russia. The reserve is divided into two subareas, and has a total land area of 14,330 square kilometres (5,530 sq mi), making it one of the largest protected areas in Russia. The delta itself has a size of about 30,000 square kilometres (12,000 sq mi), making it one of the largest in the world. It protects large concentrations of birds, including swans, geese and ducks, loons, shorebirds, raptors and gulls. It is also an important fish spawning site.

The Lena's main outlets are the Trofimov (70%), Bykov and Olenek. Nearby is the settlement of Tiksi, the administrative center of Bulunsky District, on the Bykov channel.

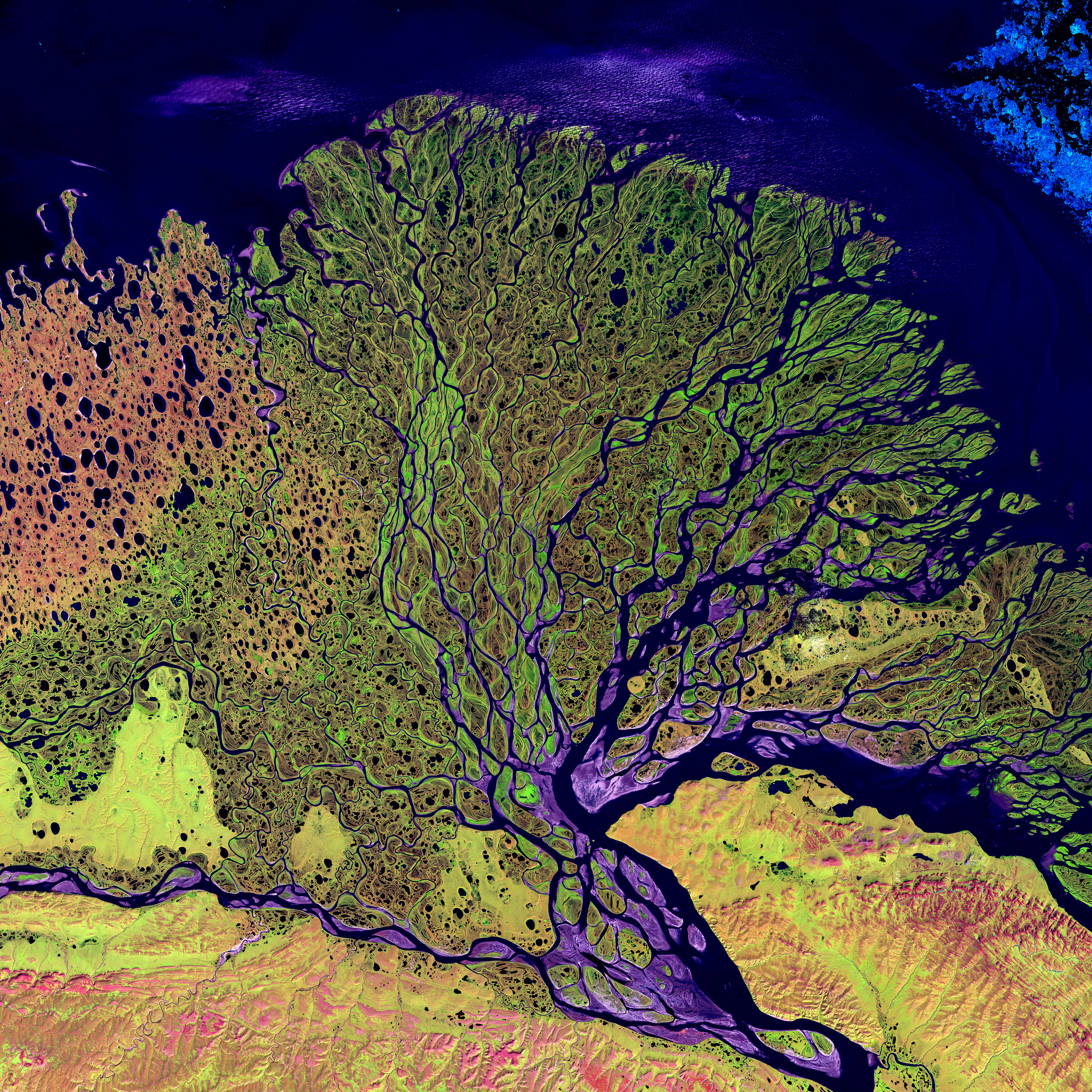
Lena Delta false-color composite satellite image
