= Alexander Vladimirovich Bykov =

Russian historian and ethnographer

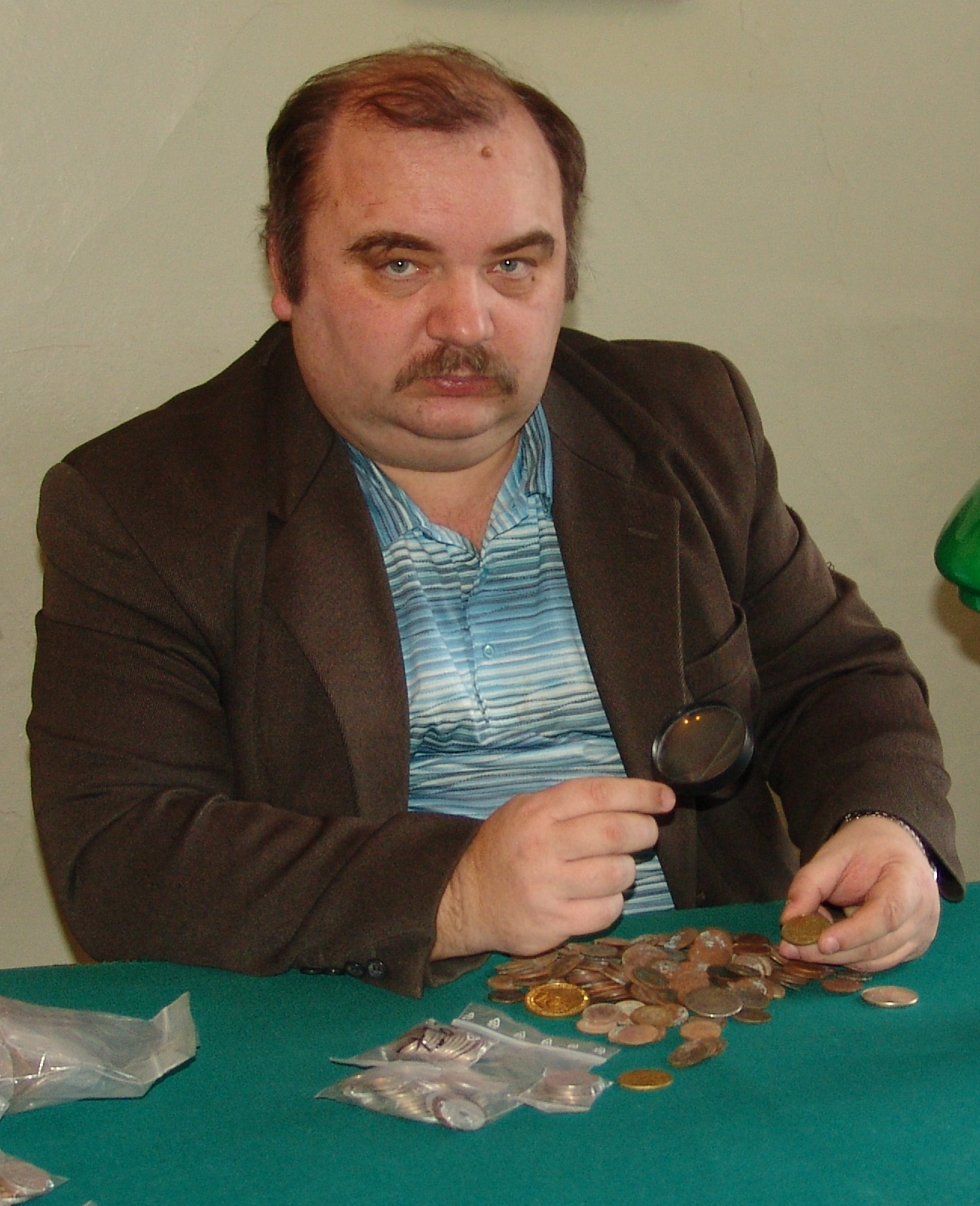
- Born: August 10, 1962; Vologda, USSR
- Citizenship: Russia
- Education: Vologda State Pedagogical University
- Known for: specialist in numismatics, ethnology, Applied and Decorative Arts, Russian history of the 17th-20th centuries, history of diplomatic relations in the 20th century.
- Awards: Medal for Distinguished Contribution to development of Collecting in Russia
- Scientific career
- Fields: numismatics, diplomatic history, history of revolutionary Russia
- Workplaces: Museum of Diplomatic Corps (director)
- Thesis: Currency circulation in European North of Russia in the first half of the 17th century (1994)
- Doctoral advisor: Elena Ivanovna Kamentseva (Russian State University for the Humanities)
- Website: alex-bykov35.livejournal.com

Alexander Vladimirovich Bykov (Russian: Алекса́ндр Влади́мирович Бы́ков; born 10 August 1962, in Vologda, USSR) is a Russian historian and ethnographer, one of the leading Russian specialists in numismatics. Publisher, founder of the first Russian private museum of political history, the Museum of Diplomatic Corps in Vologda, Russia; he is the author of multiple articles, books, and popular science publications.

== Biography ==
Alexander Bykov was born in Vologda, on 10 August 1962. In 1984, he graduated from the Vologda State Pedagogical Institute, Department of History. After graduation, he worked in a secondary school for a short time, then served in the Group of Soviet Forces in Germany. He completed his military service, and started his career as a public museums coordinator-consultant at the Vologda Museum of Local Lore, History and Economy. While occupying the position he went on a number of work trips throughout the Vologda Oblast which resulted in creating and reconstructing five museums in the districts of the region.

In 1989, Alexander Bykov was invited by the Vologda regional administration to work as a leading specialist in historical-cultural heritage of the Department of Culture. His efforts prevented putting many memorials of historical-cultural heritage under the Russian Orthodox Church’s supervision without making sure that they were taken good care of and renovated. Besides, Bykov was opposed to transferring the icon of the 15th century “Zyrianskaya Troitsa” (icon of the Holy Trinity) to the Republic of Komi. The fact that the Russia Federation President’s representative in the Vologda Oblast insisted on the handover did not influence his viewpoint. Bykov was supported by other cultural figures of the Vologda region. As a result, with the united efforts the icon was left in the collection of the Vologda reserve museum.

In 1992, Bykov left civil service, started in private business but continued his research. In 1994, Bykov defended his Ph.D. thesis, and in 1997 organized the Museum of Diplomatic Corps, the first Russian private museum of political history.

From 2002 to 2009, Bykov published a historical-local lore magazine "Piatnitskiy Boulevard". At the same time he organized exhibitions on the history of Vologda and the Vologda region, and exhibitions on Russian folk costumes history, old post cards, business cards, etc. Books, articles, and collected stories written or edited by Bykov, are well known in Russia among museum specialists and history-fanciers.

== Scientific works ==
A.Bykov’s first article was published on 21 February 1981, in a Vologda local paper "Krasniy Sever" (Red North). The work was devoted to the big treasure of copper coins used in the era of Ekaterina II which had been found shortly before that on the outskirts of Vologda. The article discussing the currency of the 18th century, revealed secrets of the peasants’ treasure, and analyzed the items of the discovery. The publication attracted attention. As a reaction, a TV story about the treasure was shot and shown in a serialized television program in many Soviet Union regions.

Simultaneously, Bykov studied treasures of the 16th-18th centuries in the regional and district museums. His articles came out in collected stories of the State Historical Museum in Moscow and district scientific digests. In the second half of the 1980s, in the “Memorials of numismatics in the Vologda regional museums” series, the following catalogues came out: “Treasures of the Time of Troubles”, and “Treasures of the 1830-1840s”. At about the same time he published a popular scientific brochure called “A folk costume of Kadnikov district of the Vologda Governorate”.

Since 1982 Bykov has been a permanent participant of numismatic conferences where he always gives a report. In 1993, he organized and held the first All-Russian numismatic conference in Vologda which moved the domestic numismatics field and special historical disciplines to a new stage of development. The event started a tradition of annual All-Russian numismatic conferences, and also contributed to the union of specialists from most cities of Russia, Commonwealth of Independent States’ republics, and other countries.

In 1994-1995, under the aegis of the conference, a series (9 editions) of an International numismatic literary miscellany "Moneta" (Coin) came out, edited and financially supported by Bykov. Moneta was considered to be the most significant Russian scientific publication on numismatics, and the only periodical scientific publication on numismatics in Russia at that period.

In the same year Bykov defended his Ph.D. thesis at the chair of auxiliary historical disciplines of the Russian State University for the Humanities. The subject of the thesis was “Peculiarities of currency circulation in European North of Russia in the first half of the 17th century”.

In 1996, Bykov started working on a new historical project. He gathered materials about the stay of the Entente diplomatic corps in Vologda in 1918. Bykov worked in special archives in Russia, in the U.S.A, and France. In 1998, his first big work on this subject, a book “the Diplomatic capital of Russia” was published. At the same time he organized and held an international conference “Russia and the World community in the early 20th century: Theory and practice of mutual relations” inside the walls of the “Museum of Diplomatic Corps”. In 1999, Bykov worked on a new monograph on the fate of the grand dukes Romanov, exiled in 1918 in Vologda and shot to death without legitimate criminal investigations and court decisions. The book, based on unknown archival data, gives a detailed story of the last months, of the grand dukes Romanov, Pavel Alexandrovich, Nikolay Constantinovich, and Georgiy Mikhailovich. The name of the latter is well known to the specialists in Russian numismatics history.

In January 2009, Bykov published a book entitled “And Tanya’s golden name”, where he narrated about a famous Russian poet Nikolay Rubtsov’s first love for Tatiana Reshetova (Agafonova, maiden name). The poet had devoted more than 20 poems to Reshetova, including the famous “Bouquet.” The author managed to get unique information and materials about Rubtsov from Reshetova. He was interested in the materials which had been used for the plot of the poems. Before Bykov nobody had made such a detailed research on the first love of the poet. In the book itself the author described the meeting of Reshetova and Rubtsov, their dates, letters, separation and the love that the poet cherished for many years, depicting his love in his poetry.

== Published works ==
=== Books and monographs ===
1. Быков А. В. Клады Смутного времени 1605—1619 гг. Каталог // Памятники нумизматики в музеях Вологодской области. — Вологда,МДК, 1989. — Ч. 1. — 64 с.
2. Быков А. В. Народный костюм Вологодской области. Костюм Кадниковского уезда Вологодской губернии XIX-начала XX в. — Вологда: Газета, 1990. — 48 с. (+ 16 с. вкладка.)
3. Быков А. В. Клады 30-40 гг. XVII в. Исследование и каталог // Памятники нумизматики в музеях Вологодской области. — Вологда: ЛиС, 1992. — Ч. 2. — 198 с.
4. Быков А. В. Тайну клада не гарантируем. Исторические рассказы, очерки, этюды. — Вологда: ЛиС, 1993. — 96 с.
5. Быков А. В. Денежное обращение на территории Европейского Севера России в первой половине XVII в.: Автореферат диссертации на соискание ученой степени кандидата исторических наук. — М.: Российский государственный гуманитарный университет, 1994. — 20 с.
6. Быков А. В., Панов Л. С. Дипломатический корпус в Вологде в 1918. — Вологда: Ардвисура, 1997. — 20 с.
7. Diplomatic Corps in Vologda, 1918 / Compiled and introduced by Alexander Bykov and Leonid Panov. - Vologda, 1997. - 16 p.
8. Быков А. В., Панов Л. С. Дипломатическая столица России. — Вологда: Ардвисура, 1998. — 198 с.
9. Быков А. В. От зимних святок до Филиппова заговения. Народный костюм земли Вологодской в достоверных рисунках и правдивых рассказах (художник Э. Д. Попова). — Вологда: МДК, 1999. — 36 с., илл.
10. Быков А. В. Путь на Голгофу. Хроника гибели великих князей Романовых. — Вологда: МДК, 2000. — 192 с.
11. Быков А. В. У Спаса на погосте. — Вологда: МДК, 2002. — 140 с.
12. Быков А. В. Пава и древо: очерки истории вологодского кружевоплетения. — Вологда: МДК, 2004. — 80 с.
13. Быков А. В. Любашевский Ф. А. Монеты Албании. Исследование. Каталог. Ч. 1-2. — Вологда: МДК, 2006.
14. Быков А. В. Посланники Запада. — Вологда: МДК, 2008. — 24 с.
15. Быков А. В. И золотое имя Таня… Повесть о первой любви поэта Николая Рубцова — Вологда: МДК, 2009. — 128 с.
16. Быков А. В. Точка зрения слуги. «Письма американского негра о русской революции (1917—1918 гг.)»: научно-исследовательская публикация. — Вологда: МДК, 2009. — 80 с.

=== Booklets and brochures ===
1. Знаменитые Иконы Кириллова монастыря, буклет. Вологда: Издательство «Музей Дипломатического Корпуса», 2002. — 14 с.
2. Быков А. В., Шустрова М. Ю. Памятники нумизматики из фондов Вологодского областного краеведческого музея. — Вологда, 1983.
3. Быков А. В. Возмездие Святой Софии. — Вологда: Ардвисура, 1997.
4. Мы рисуем Вологду. Исторические рассказы и альбом для раскрашивания / [Ред.-сост. А. В. Быков, худ. Э. Д. Попова]. — Вологда: Ардвисура, 1998. — 24 с., илл.
5. Провинциальный альбом: Вологда на почтовых открытках начала XX века / [Ред.-сост. А. В. Быков]. Вологда: Ардвисура, 1999. — 210 с., илл.
6. Быков А. В., Кузнецов А. В. От Волги до Балтики, путеводитель. Вологда: МДК, 2002, — 10 с.

=== Scientific and publicistic articles ===
1. Быков А. В. Нумизматическая коллекция Вологодского областного краеведческого музея (на венгерском языке) // Записки музея имени Отто Германа (Венгрия)(на венгерском языке). — Мишкольц. — 1984. — № 22. — С. 22-27.
2. Быков А. В. О содержании термина «пирог» в денежном обращении России XVII в. Нумизматика. Материалы и исследования // Труды Государственного Исторического музея. Нумизматический сборник. — Ч. 10. — М., 1988. — Вып. 69. — С. 6-13.
3. Быков А. В. Некоторые особенности денежного обращения в России в первой половине XVII столетия // Труды музея имени Отто Германа (Венгрия) (на венгерском языке). — Мишкольц, 1989. № XXVII. — С. 575—588.
4. Быков А. В. О судьбе мелкой разменной монеты в России в первой половине XVII в. // Культура Европейского Севера России. Дооктябрьский период. Межвузовский сборник научных трудов. — Вологда, 1989. — С. 21-30.
5. Быков А. В. О вологодских монастырских кладах // Деньги и кредит. — 1992. — № 11. — С. 63-65.
6. Быков А. В. Борьба с фальшивомонетчиками в Московском государстве в первой половине XVII в. Нумизматика, бонистика, фалеристика // Труды Государственного Исторического музея. Нумизматический сборник. — Ч. 2. — М., 1992. — Вып. 80. — С. 79-85.
7. Быков А. В. Дневник Екатерины Кукановой (Статья и публикация документа) // Бысть на Устюзе. Историко-краеведческий сборник. — Вологда: «ЛиС», 1993. — С. 238—253.
8. Быков А. В. Ефимки на Русском Севере в первой половине XVII в. // Международный нумизматический альманах «Монета». — Вологда: Ардвисура, 1994. — Вып. 1. — С. 4-12.
9. Быков А. В. Грязовецкии уезд в записях современников и трудах историков конца XVIII—XIX вв. // Городок на Московской дороге. Историко-краеведческий сборник. — Вологда: Ардвисура, 1994. — С. 201—233.
10. Быков А. В. Материалы по этнографии и фольклору Грязовецкого уезда (статья и публикация) // Городок на Московской дороге. Историко-краеведческий сборник. — Вологда: Ардвисура, 1994. — С. 235—260.
11. Быков А. В. Священник Богословский и его книга. Вступительная статья // Богословский Н. Церковь святого пророка Илии в селе Кубенском (репринт кидания 1898 г.). — Вологда, 1994. — С. 3-4.
12. Быков А. В. Город Тотьма. Вступительная статья // Попов В. Т. Город Тотьма Вологодской губернии (репринт издания 1886 г.). — Вологда, 1995. — С. 2.
13. Быков А. В. Клад монет XVII в. из деревни Ермолинская Вологодского уезда // Международный нумизматический альманах «Монета». — Вологда: Ардвисура, 1996. — Вып. 4. — С. 37-57.
14. Быков А. Дипломатическая столица России // Русский Север. — Пятница. — 1997. — 24 января.
15. Ивану Грозному была уготована в Вологде смерть // Русский Север. — Пятница. — 1997. — 28 марта. — С. 6
16. Быков А. В. Метрологические реликты «мортка-пирог» в денежном обращении Московского государства XVI—XVII вв. // Международный нумизматический альманах «Монета». — Вологда: Ардвисура, 1998. — Вып. 5. — С. 50-61.
17. Быков А. В. Рейли, Райли, Гиллеспи… // Эхо планеты. — 1998. — № 5. — С. 18-21.
18. Быков А. В. Великокняжеский чекан второй половины XVI в. (О так называемых «гибридных» Монетах XVI в.) // Международный нумизматический альманах «Монета». — Вологда: Ардвисура, 1999. — Вып. 6. — С. 66-72.
19. Провинциальный альбом. Вологда на почтовых открытках начала XX в. От составителя. — Вологда: Ардвисура, 1999. — С. 3-8.
20. Быков А. В. По северу России. Вступительная статья // Случёвский К. К. По северу России. Главы о городах Вологодской области. — Вологда: МДК, 2000. — С 3-8.
21. Быков А. В. А. С. Мельникова и её научные труды // Международный нумизматический альманах «Монета». — Вологда: МДК, 2000. — С. 11-15.
22. Быков А. В. Донесения и мемуары французского посла Жозефа Нуланса о начале выпуска «английских» рублей в Северной области в 1918 г. // Международный нумизматический альманах «Монета». — Вологда: МДК, 2000. — Вып. 7. — С. 68-93.
23. Быков А. В., Панов Л. С. Пребывание и деятельность французского посольства в Вологде в 1918 г. // Французская культура в русской провинции (Вологодскии край). Материалы чтений. — Вологда, 2000. — С. 5-22.
24. Быков А.В. Символ Британии // Website http://www.numizmat.net, 21.09.2006
25. Аддисон Дж. Приключения Шиллинга / Комм. А.В. Быков // Website http://www.numizmat.net, 29.10.2006
26. Быков А.В. Тайна XXI главы // Пятницкий бульвар. – 2008. – № 4(68). – С. 7; № 5(69). – С. 7; № 6(70). – С. 6-7; № 7(71). – С. 6-7
27. Быков А.В. Посольские будни // Пятницкий бульвар. – 2008. – № 1(65). – С. 8-9; № 2(66). – С. 8-9; № 3(67). – С. 6-7; № 4(68). – С. 8-9; № 5(69). – С. 9; № 8(72). – С. 6-7; № 9(73). – С. 6-7.

=== Conferences’ thesis ===
1. Быков А. В. О метрологическом значении термина «пирог» в денежном обращении России XVI—XVII вв. // Тезисы Второй всесоюзной нумизматической конференции. — М., 1987. — С. 4-5.
2. Быков А. В. Опись «денежной казны» М. И. Строганова 1627. Опыт источниковедческого анализа // Археография и источниковедение истории Европейского Севера РСФСР. Тезисы республиканской конференции. — Вологда, 1989. — Ч. 2. — С. 68-71.
3. Быков А. В. Вологодское общество изучения Северного края. К восьмидесятилетию со дня создания // Вологодское краеведение, его научные и воспитательные задачи. Тезисы докладов и сообщений Второй краеведческой научно-практической конференции. — Вологда, 1989. — С. 5-7.
4. Быков А. В. «Монастырское нестроение» и вологодские монастырские клады сороковых годов XVII столетия // Тезисы Третьей краеведческой научно-практической конференции. — Вологда, 1990. — С. 36-38.
5. Быков А. В. «Корелки худые» на севере Русского государства в первой половине XVII в. // Европейский Север: история и современность. Тезисы докладов Всероссийской научной конференции. — Петрозаводск, 1990. — С. 136—137.
6. Быков А. В. Наличные деньги крестьян Северной Руси и некоторые проблемы тезаврации кладов в первой половине XVII в. // Тезисы докладов и сообщений Всероссийской нумизматической конференции в Вологде. — Вологда, 1993. — С. 55-57.
7. Быков А. В. «Шкилевая» медь на территории Северной Руси в XVII в. // Вторая всероссийская нумизматическая конференция в Санкт-Петербурге. Тезисы докладов. — СПб., 1994. — С. 20-22.
8. Быков А. В. Деньги с именем Ивана IV. (Проблемы атрибуции памятников нерегулярного чекана XVI—XVII вв.) Третья всероссийская нумизматическая конференция во Владимире. Тезисы докладов. — М., 1995. — С. 50-52.
9. Быков А. В. Основные проблемы изучения денежного обращения в России второй половины XVII в. (на примере кладов Великоустюгского уезда) // Четвёртая всероссийская нумизматическая конференция в Дмитрове. — М., 1996. — С. 95-97.
10. Быков А. В. Новый документ по истории денежного обращения на севере России в годы гражданской войны // Пятая всероссийская нумизматическая конференция в Москве. Тезисы докладов и сообщений. — М., 1997. — С. 97-98.
11. Быков А. В. Вологодская ссылка 1918 г. великого князя Георгия Михайловича // Шестая всероссийская нумизматическая конференция в Санкт-Петербурге. Тезисы докладов и сообщений. — СПб., 1998. — С. 221—222.
12. Быков А. В. «Вологодский период» в деятельности дипломатического корпуса стран Антанты в 1918 г. // Россия и мировое сообщество в начале XX в. Теория и практика взаимоотношений. Тезисы Международной научной конференции. — Вологда, 1998. — С. 6-10.
13. Быков А. В. Донесения и мемуары французского посла Ж. Нуланса о начале выпуска «английских» рублей в Северной области в 1918 г. // Седьмая всероссийская нумизматическая конференция в Ярославле. Тезисы докладов и сообщений. — М., 1999. — С. 189—191.
14. Быков А. В. Русская нумизматическая беллетристика второй половины XVII в. и её английский прототип // Восьмая всероссийская нумизматическая конференция в Москве. Тезисы докладов и сообщений. — М., 2000. — С. 291—292.
15. Быков А. В. «Обол Харона» русских кладбищ второй пол. XVII — первой пол. XVIII в.: На примере подъёмного материала из Вологды // Девятая всероссийская нумизматическая конференция в Санкт-Петербурге. Тезисы докладов и сообщений. — СПб., 2001. — С.145-146.
16. Быков А.В. Будни дипломата // 1917 год в истории России и современной идеологии: сборник материалов областной научно-практической конференции 3 ноября 2007 года, посвященной 90-летию Великой Октябрьской социалистической революции. – Вологда, 2009. – С. 50-67

=== Stories ===
1. Быков А. В. Ваша нечисть // Пятницкий бульвар. — 2007. — № 8(60). — С. 8-9.
2. Быков А. В. За грибами // Пятницкий бульвар. — 2003. — № 9(13). — С 21.
3. Быков А. В. Николины каникулы // Пятницкий бульвар. — 2003. — № 1(5). — С. 22-33; № 2(6). — С. 22-33.
4. Быков А. В. Последнее свидание // Пятницкий бульвар. — 2003. — № 10(14). — С. 22-23.
5. Быков А. В. Тихий омут // Пятницкий бульвар. — 2003. — № 7(11). — С. 22-23.

In additions to the mentioned above, A. Bykov published and edited 12 scientific collections, 7 scientific and popular scientific books and brochures.
