= Cryptochironomus =

Scientific classification
- Kingdom: Animalia
- Phylum: Arthropoda
- Class: Insecta
- Order: Diptera
- Family: Chironomidae
- Subfamily: Chironominae
- Genus: Cryptochironomus; Kieffer, 1918

Type species
- Chironomus (Cryptochironomus) chlorolobus Kieffer, 1918

Subgenera
- Chironozorina Koçak & Kemal, 2008; Cryptochironomus

Synonyms
- Chironozorina Kocak & Kemal, 2008; Miscellanea Zorina, 2000

Genus of non-biting midges

Cryptochironomus is a genus of nonbiting midges in the family Chironomidae. There are more than 80 described species in Cryptochironomus.

== Species ==
These 89 species belong to the genus Cryptochironomus:

- Cryptochironomus acuminatus Dutta & Chaudhuri, 1996
- Cryptochironomus albofasciatus (Staeger, 1839)
- Cryptochironomus angularis Kieffer, 1922
- Cryptochironomus apicalis Kieffer, 1924
- Cryptochironomus argus Roback, 1957
- Cryptochironomus astax Roback, 1960
- Cryptochironomus bavaricus (Goetghebuer, 1939)
- Cryptochironomus bipunctatus Kieffer, 1924
- Cryptochironomus blarina Townes, 1945
- Cryptochironomus boreus (Goetghebuer, 1940)
- Cryptochironomus brasiliensis Silva, Trivinho-Strixino & Oliveira, 2010
- Cryptochironomus brevipalpis Konstantinov, 1952
- Cryptochironomus bulbosus Guha & Chaudhuri, 1985
- Cryptochironomus calyxus Guha & Chaudhuri, 1985
- Cryptochironomus camptolabis Kieffer
- Cryptochironomus chaetoala (Sublette, 1960)
- Cryptochironomus coarctatus (Kieffer, 1911)
- Cryptochironomus conjugens (Kieffer, 1921)
- Cryptochironomus conus Mason, 1985
- Cryptochironomus crassiforceps Goetghebuer, 1931
- Cryptochironomus curryi Mason, 1985
- Cryptochironomus curtilamellatus
- Cryptochironomus daitoijea (Sasa & Suzuki, 2001)
- Cryptochironomus defectiforceps Kieffer, 1922
- Cryptochironomus defectus (Kieffer, 1913)
- Cryptochironomus denticulatus (Goetghebuer, 1921)
- Cryptochironomus diceras Kieffer, 1923
- Cryptochironomus digitatus Malloch, 1915
- Cryptochironomus dilatatus Zorina, 2000
- Cryptochironomus dimidiatus Kieffer, 1924
- Cryptochironomus distractus (Johannsen, 1932)
- Cryptochironomus eminentia Mason, 1985
- Cryptochironomus forficula Kieffer, 1921
- Cryptochironomus fulvus Johannsen, 1905
- Cryptochironomus gracilidentatus Konstantinov, 1948
- Cryptochironomus gracilis Dutta & Chaudhuri, 1996
- Cryptochironomus griseidorsum (Kieffer, 1917)
- Cryptochironomus hentonensis Hasegawa & Sasa, 1987
- Cryptochironomus hirtalatus (Beck & Beck, 1964)
- Cryptochironomus hirticeps (Kieffer, 1918)
- Cryptochironomus imitans Saether, 2009
- Cryptochironomus inaabeus (Sasa, Kitami & Suzuki, 2001)
- Cryptochironomus inabeceus (Sasa, Kitami & Suzuki, 2001)
- Cryptochironomus incertus Lehmann, 1979
- Cryptochironomus incisus (Kruseman, 1949)
- Cryptochironomus inornatus Kieffer, 1922
- Cryptochironomus javae Kieffer, 1924
- Cryptochironomus jokaprimus Sasa & Ogata, 1999
- Cryptochironomus judicius Chaudhuri & Chattopadhyay, 1990
- Cryptochironomus kiefferianus (Goetghebuer & Lenz, 1937)
- Cryptochironomus kikuyui (Kieffer, 1913)
- Cryptochironomus lindneri (Freeman, 1954)
- Cryptochironomus lippini Konstantinov, 1948
- Cryptochironomus longimanus Kieffer, 1924
- Cryptochironomus maculus Yan & Wang, 2016
- Cryptochironomus mantiqueira Silva, Trivinho-Strixino & Oliveira, 2010
- Cryptochironomus misumaiprimus (Sasa & Suzuki, 1998)
- Cryptochironomus neonilicola (Freeman, 1957)
- Cryptochironomus nigrocorporis (Freeman, 1957)
- Cryptochironomus nigrotibialis (Goetghebuer, 1921)
- Cryptochironomus niligenus (Kieffer, 1923)
- Cryptochironomus nilogenes Kieffer, 1925
- Cryptochironomus obreptans (Walker, 1856)
- Cryptochironomus parafulvus (Beck & Beck, 1964)
- Cryptochironomus polius (Kieffer, 1911)
- Cryptochironomus ponapensis (Tokunaga, 1964)
- Cryptochironomus ponderosus (Sublette, 1964)
- Cryptochironomus protuberans Yan & Wang, 2016
- Cryptochironomus psammophila Botnariuc, 1956
- Cryptochironomus psittacinus (Meigen, 1830)
- Cryptochironomus ramus Mason, 1985
- Cryptochironomus rectus Zorina, 2000
- Cryptochironomus redekei (Kruseman, 1933)
- Cryptochironomus reshchikovi Silva, Trivinho-Strixino & Oliveira, 2010
- Cryptochironomus rostratus Kieffer, 1921
- Cryptochironomus scimitarus Townes, 1945
- Cryptochironomus sorex Townes, 1945
- Cryptochironomus sphagnorum Kieffer, 1924
- Cryptochironomus stackelbergi (Goetghebuer, 1933)
- Cryptochironomus subovatus (Freeman, 1954)
- Cryptochironomus supplicans (Meigen, 1830)
- Cryptochironomus tamaichimori Sasa, 1987
- Cryptochironomus tamayoroi Sasa, 1983
- Cryptochironomus tokaracedeus Sasa & Suzuki, 1995
- Cryptochironomus tokaraefea (Sasa & Suzuki, 1995)
- Cryptochironomus tonewabea (Sasa & Tanaka, 2002)
- Cryptochironomus tricolor Kieffer, 1924
- Cryptochironomus ussouriensis (Goetghebuer, 1933)
- Cryptochironomus viridiclava Kieffer, 1922
