= Arga Muora Sise =

Coordinates: 73°26′20″N 124°29′00″E

Map of part of Arga Island, showing the plethora of thermokarst lakes

Arga Muora Sise (also called Arga Island) is an uninhabited island in the Russian arctic. It is in the western Lena River Delta, and is the largest island in that delta, and the 99th largest island in the world.

Arga Muora Sise is about 6,500 square kilometres (2,500 sq mi) in area, and is mostly a low plain of sandy sediments, with thermokarst lakes throughout, the largest being Lake Nikolay. It is affected and changed by aeolian processes and erosion, but whether the formation of the island was by glacial or periglacial process remains in dispute.
